= Renault–Nissan Common Module Family =

Common Module Family (CMF)

Overview
- Manufacturer: Renault–Nissan–Mitsubishi Alliance
- Production: 2013–present

Body and chassis
- Layout: Front-engine, front-wheel-drive; Front-engine, four-wheel-drive
- Platform: CMF-A; CMF-A+; CMF-B; CMF-C/D; CMF-EV

Chronology
- Predecessor: For CMF-B; Nissan B platform; For CMF-C/D; Nissan C platform; Nissan D platform

The Common Module Family (CMF) is a modular architecture concept jointly developed by car manufacturers Nissan and Renault through their Renault–Nissan–Mitsubishi Alliance partnership. The concept covers a wide range of vehicle platforms.

== Main features ==
CMF is aimed at reducing manufacturing costs and competing with similar previous concepts as Volkswagen Group's MQB. It consists of five groups of interchangeable, compatible modules: engine bay, cockpit, front underbody, rear underbody and electrical/electronic. According to the companies involved in the development, CMF is not a conventional platform but rather a manufacturing system which can be applied to different vehicles. The actual platforms are built combining a limited set of common modules: a single module can be used for different platforms, covering different classes of vehicles, and so allowing a greater standardisation of components among Nissan, Renault and Mitsubishi.

== Applications ==
The Renault–Nissan Alliance announced various variants developed using CMF, which are CMF-C (D for large and mid-sized vehicles; examples are the third-generation Nissan X-Trail and the second-generation Nissan Qashqai), CMF-B for subcompacts/supermini, CMF-A for smaller vehicles, and CMF-EV for alliance wide BEV. The CMF will initially be used in approximately 14 vehicle models worldwide with an estimated production of 1.6 million units annually. The first CMF vehicles were introduced through 2013 with Nissan's CMF-C/D models.

Dacia, Datsun, Dongfeng, Mercedes-Benz, Mitsubishi, Nissan, Renault, and Venucia have all used CMF platforms. Alpine and Lada are expected to begin using the platforms in 2025.

=== CMF-A ===
The CMF-A platform underpins various vehicles in the A-segment or city car segment. The first CMF-A car, the Renault Kwid, was launched into the Indian market in September 2015. The platform currently also supports electric powertrain, for the Renault City K-ZE and its rebadged models.

Vehicles using platform (calendar years):

- Renault Kwid (2015–present)
- Datsun redi-GO (2016–2022)
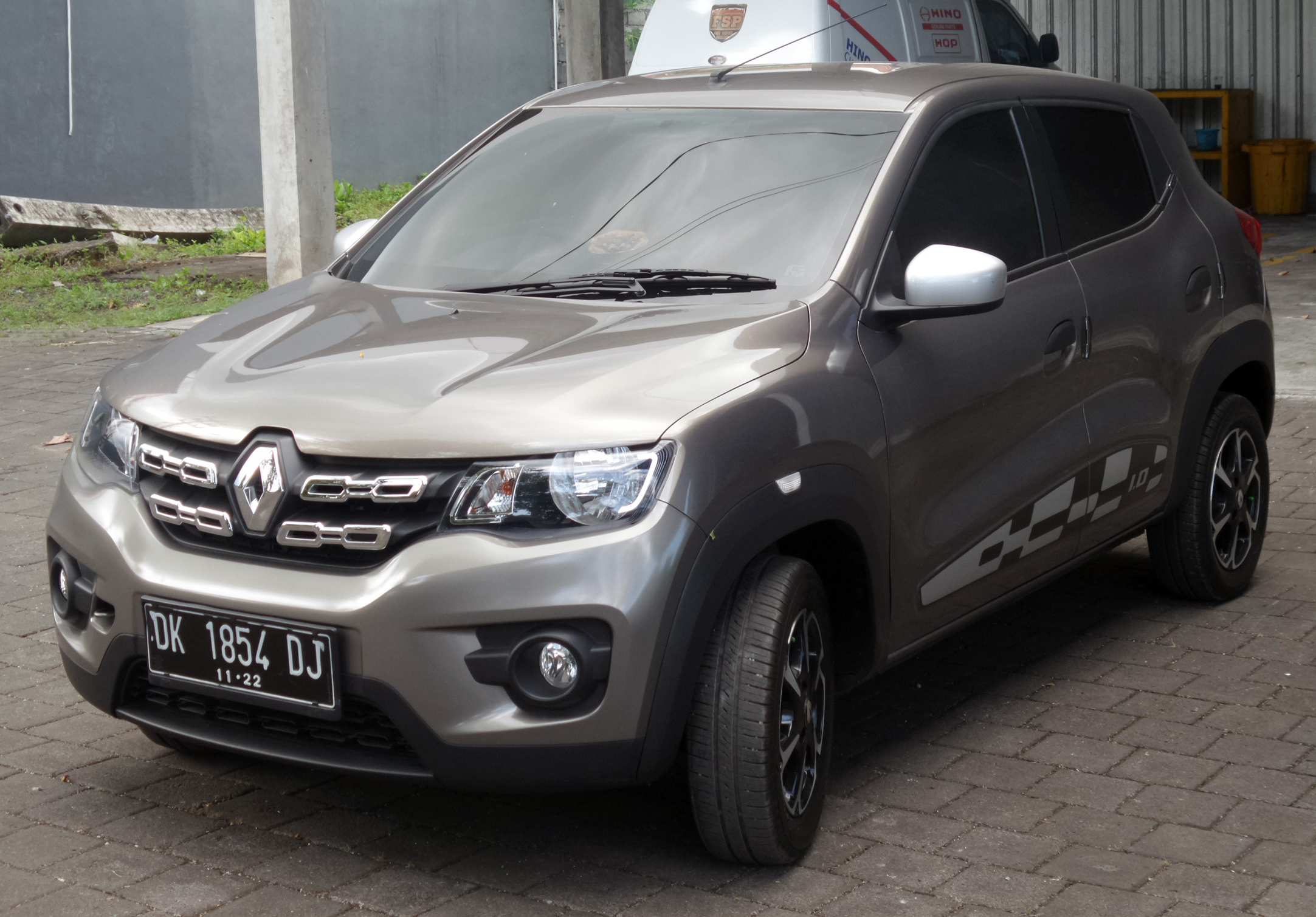
Renault Kwid

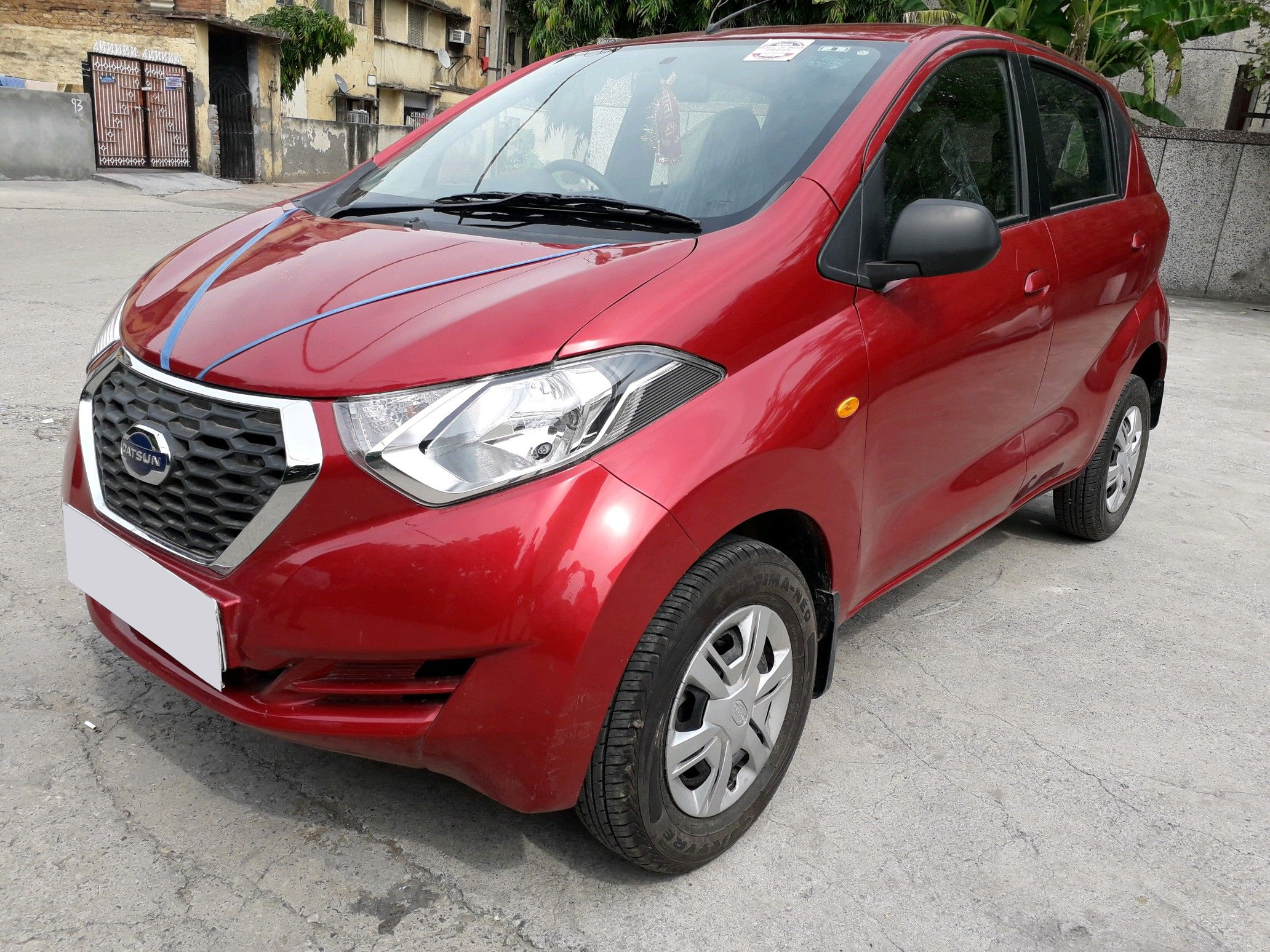
Datsun redi-Go

==== CMFA-EV ====
The CMFA-EV is the name used for the CMF-A platform that is adapted for battery electric vehicle application.

Vehicles using platform (calendar years):

- Renault City K-ZE (2019–present)
  - Dacia Spring Electric (2021–present)
  - Dongfeng Aeolus EX1 (2019–2021)
  - Dongfeng Fengxing T1 (2019–2021)
  - Dongfeng Fengguang E1 (2019–2024)
  - Dongfeng Nano Box (2022–2024)
  - Venucia e30 (2019–2023)
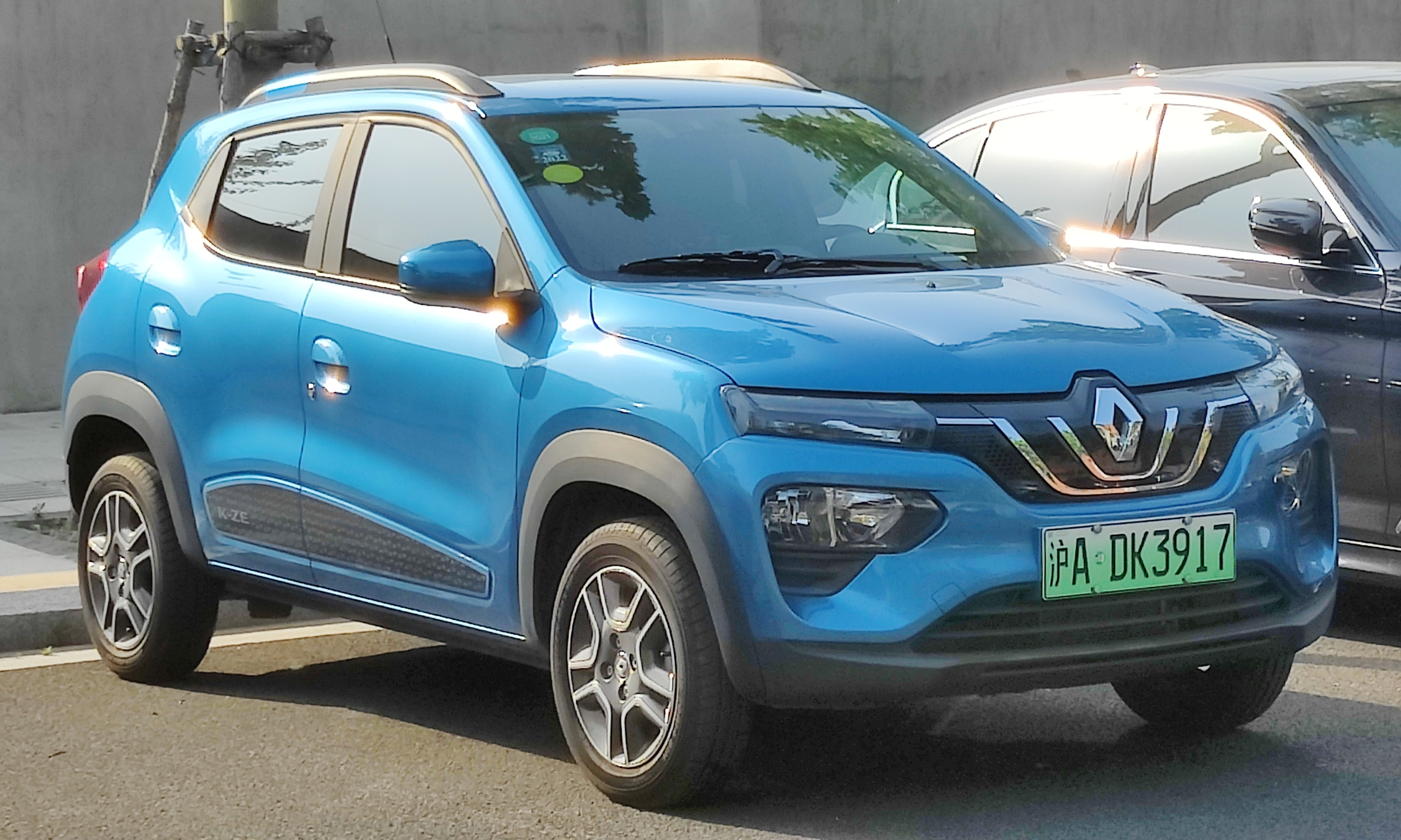
Renault City K-ZE

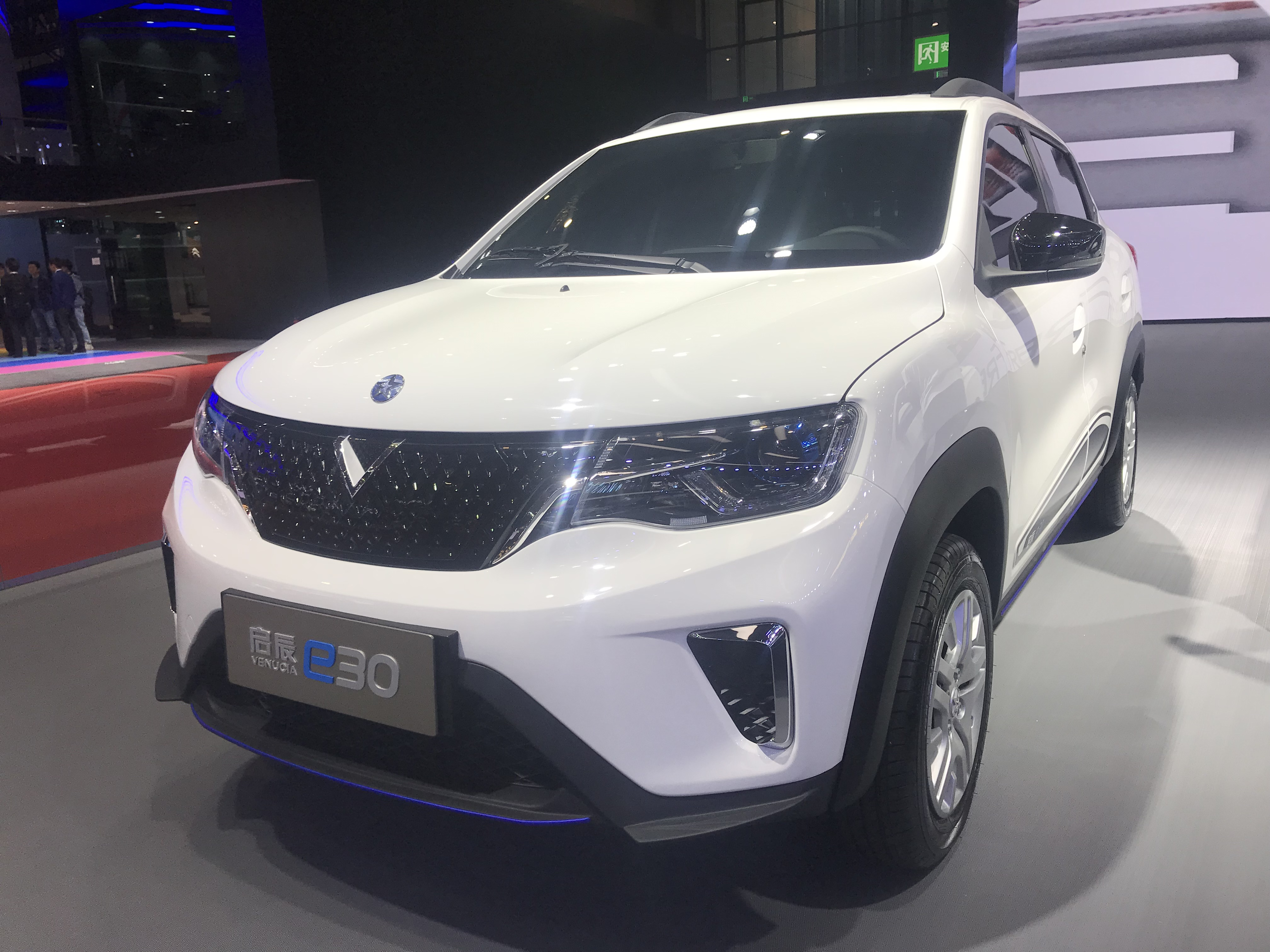
Venucia e30

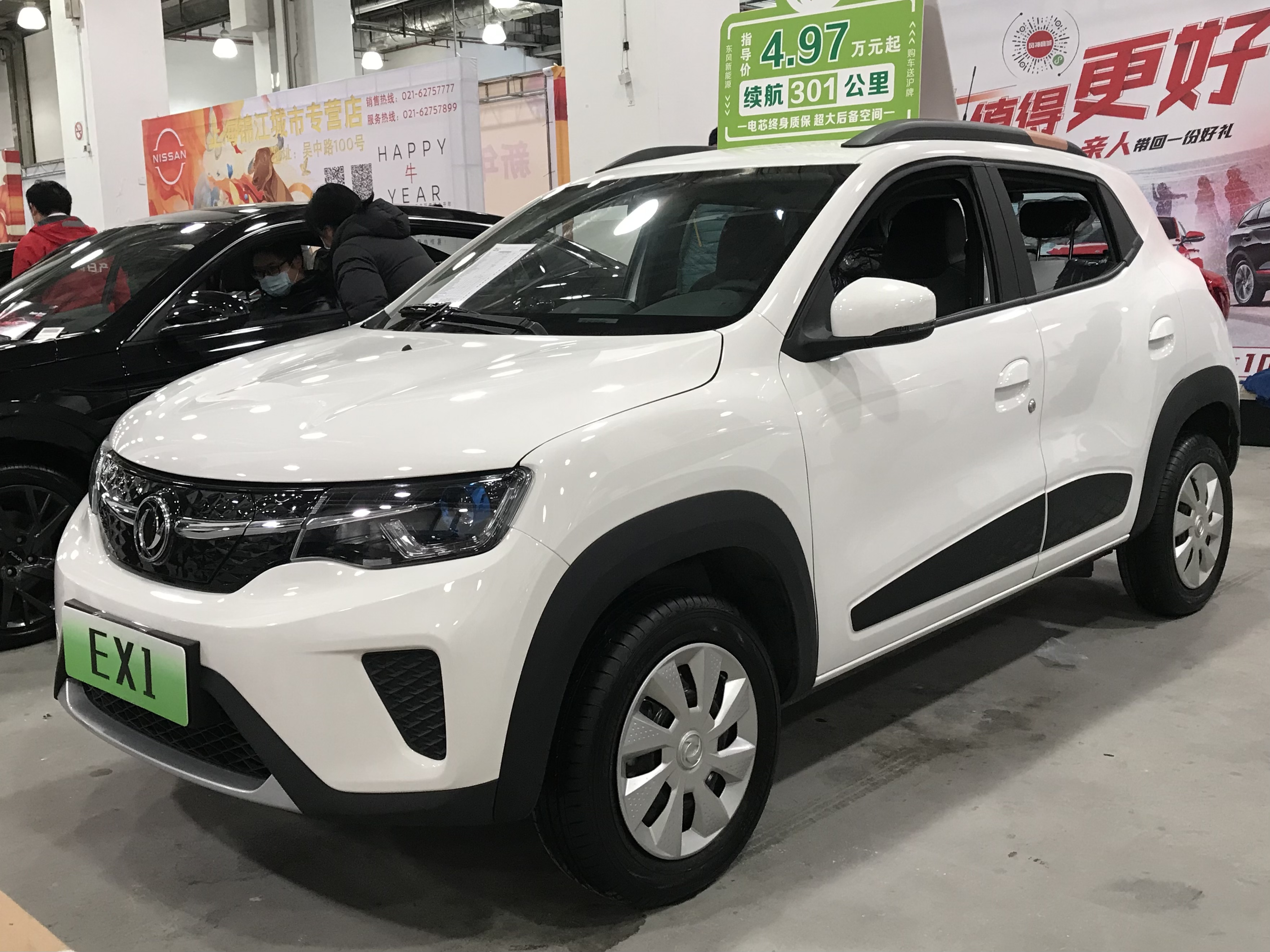
Dongfeng Aeolus EX1

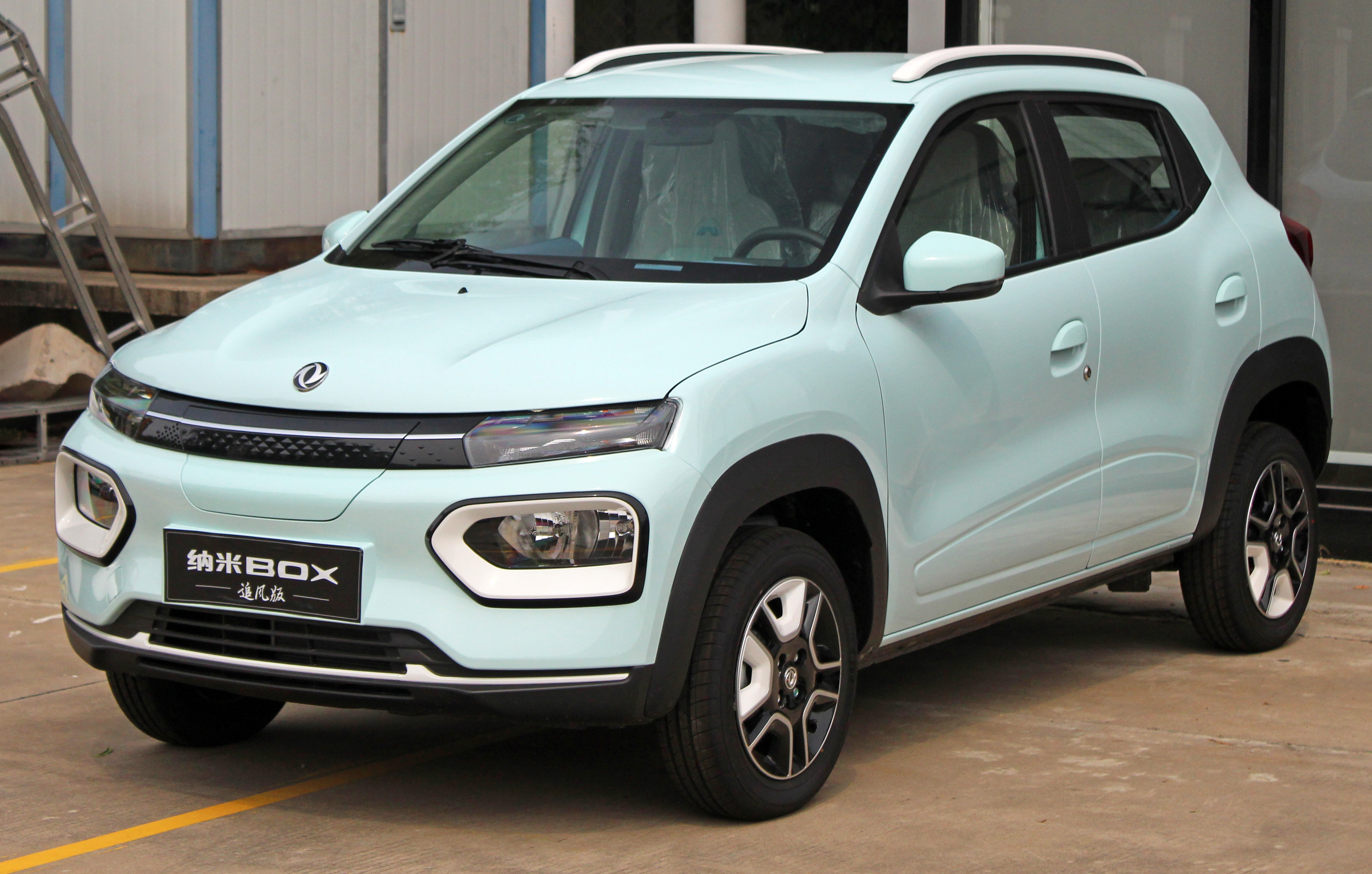
Dongfeng Nano Box

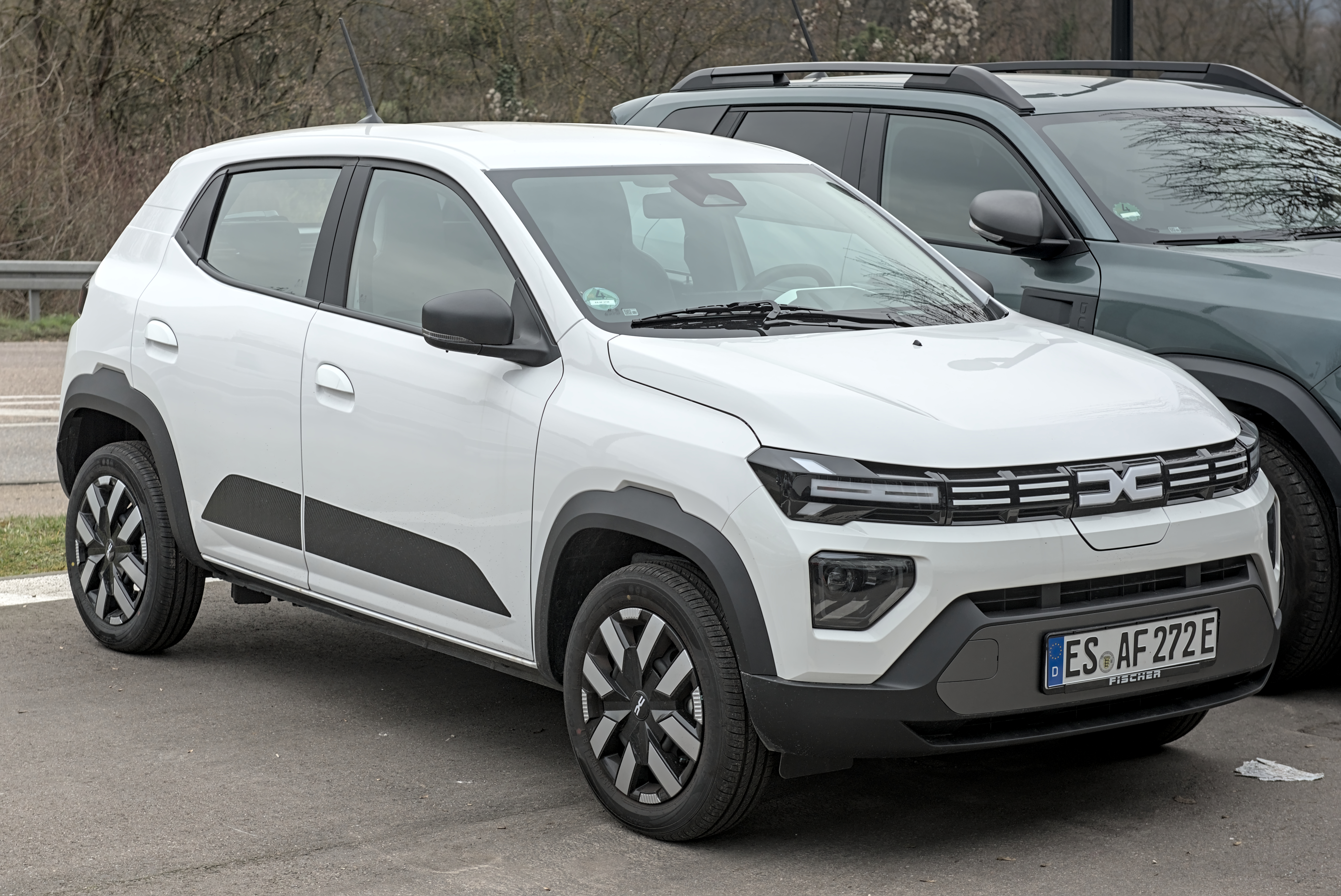
Dacia Spring Electric

==== CMF-A+ ====
The CMF-A+ platform is a larger derivative of the CMF-A platform. The platform is mainly utilized for low-cost B-segment or subcompact vehicles for emerging markets.

Vehicles using platform (calendar years):

- Renault Triber (2019–present)
  - Nissan Gravite (2026–present)
- Renault Kiger (2021–present)
- Nissan Magnite — DD0 (2020–present)
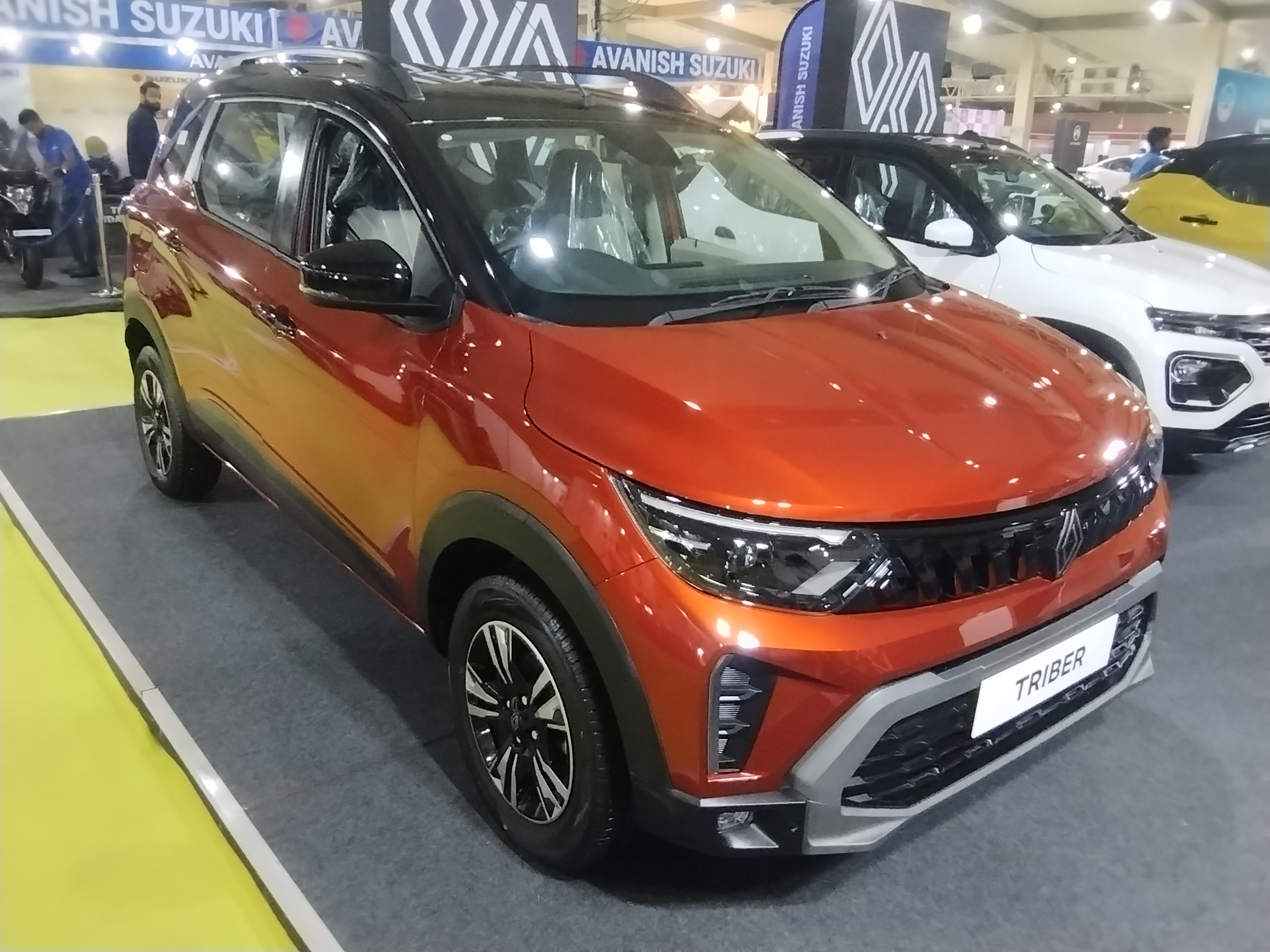
Renault Triber

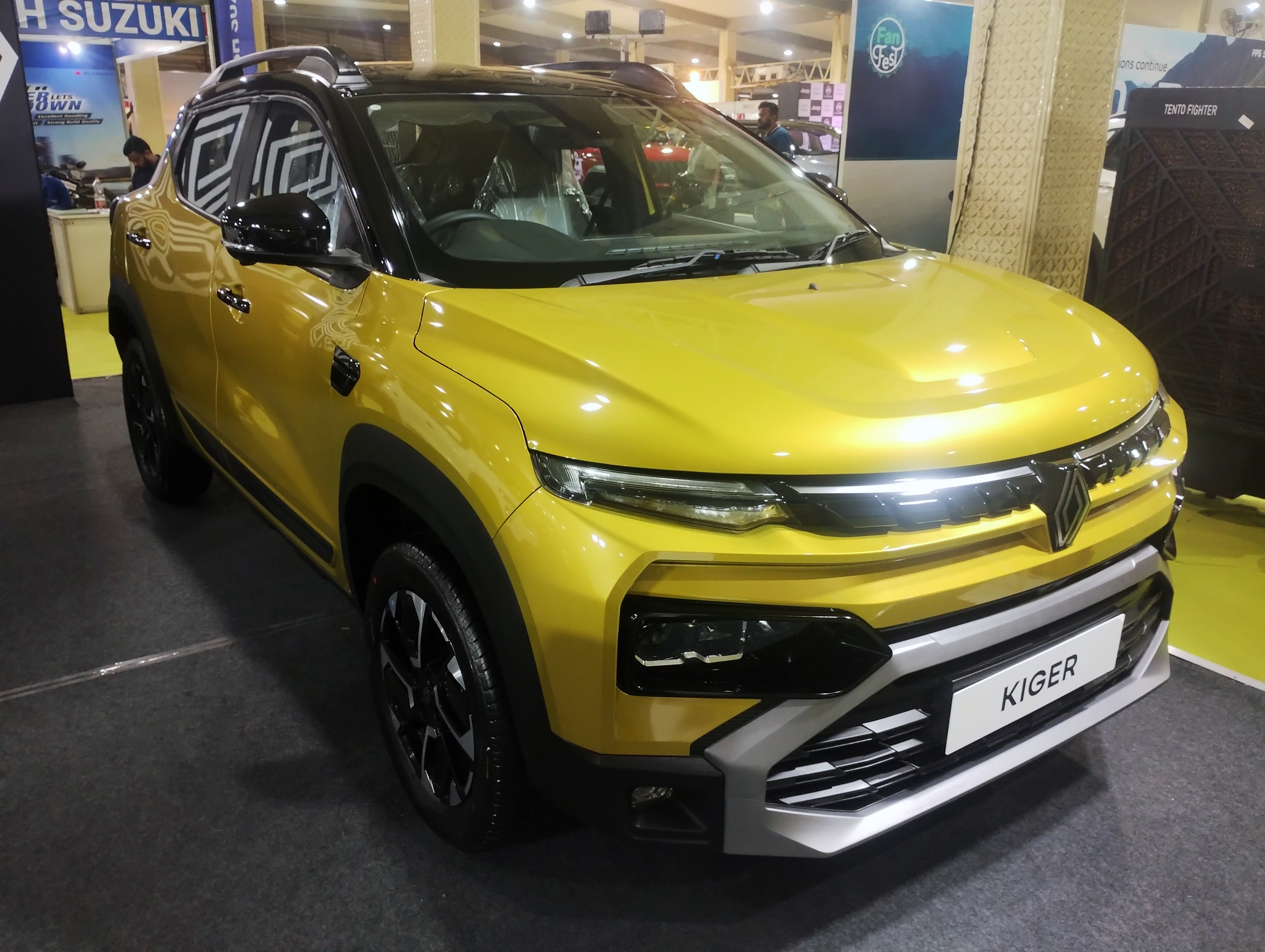
Renault Kiger

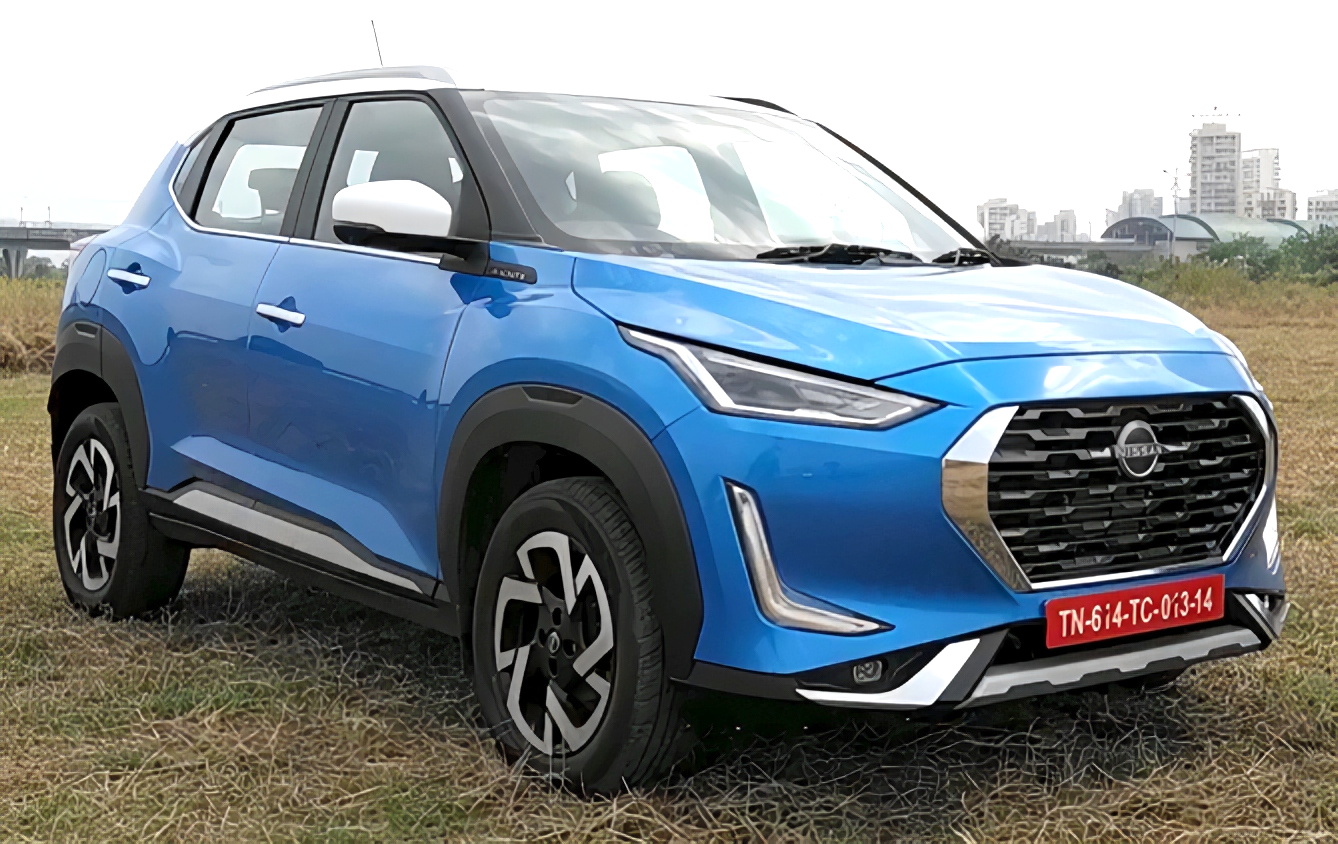
Nissan Magnite

=== CMF-B ===
==== CMF-B HS ====
The CMF-B HS (high specifications) platform underpins higher end vehicles in the B-segment/supermini or subcompact segment. The platform replaces the B platform and V platform.

Vehicles using platform (calendar years):

- Renault Clio V (2019–2026)
  - Mitsubishi Colt (2023–2025)
- Renault Clio VI (2025–present)
- Renault Captur II (2019–present)
  - Mitsubishi ASX (2023–present)
- Renault Arkana/Mégane Conquest/Renault Samsung XM3 (South Korean-built only, 2020–2026)
- Renault Symbioz (2024–present)
  - Mitsubishi Grandis (2025–present)
- Nissan Juke — F16 (2019–present)
- Nissan Kicks — P16 (2024–present)
- Nissan Note — E13 (2020–present)
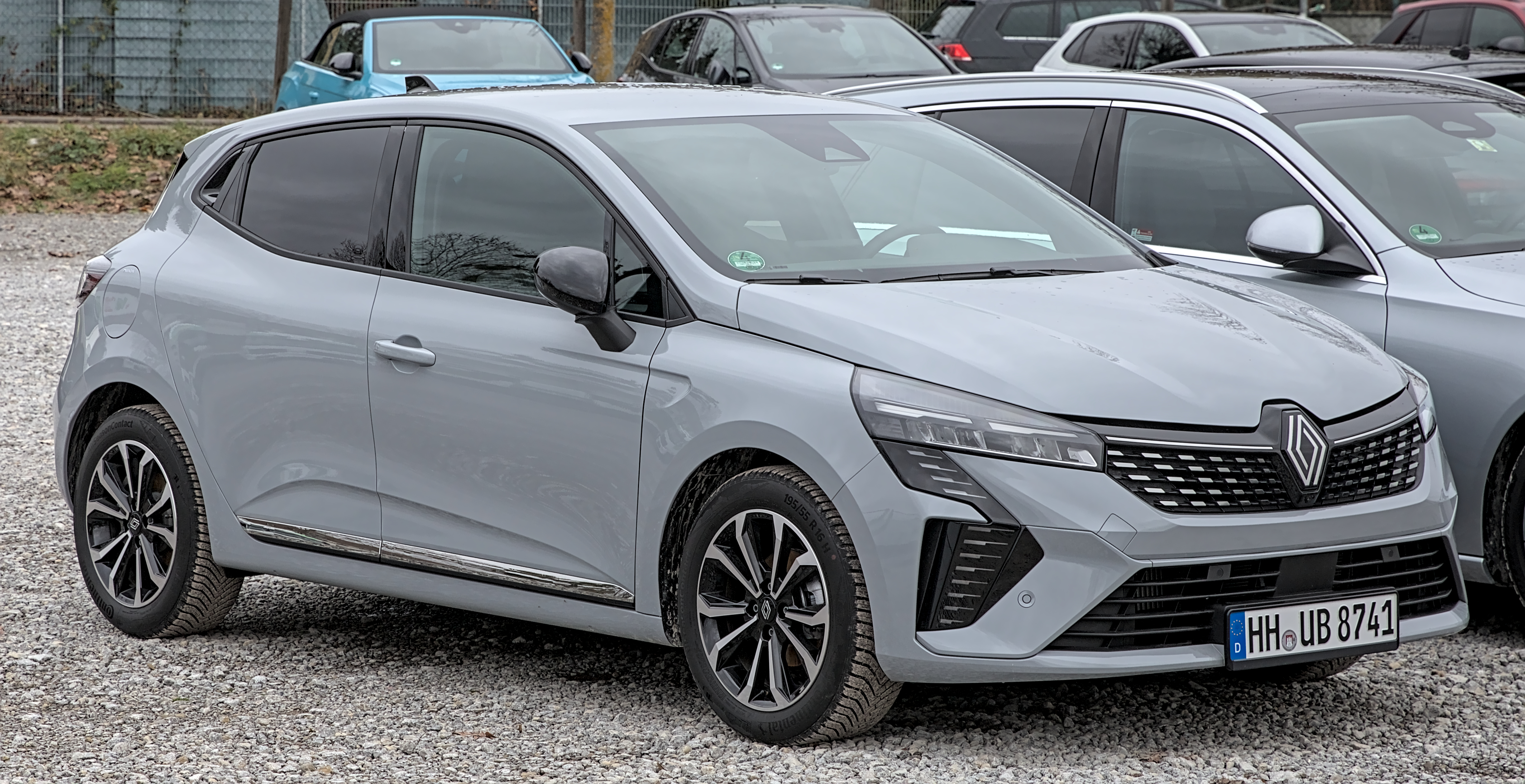
Renault Clio V

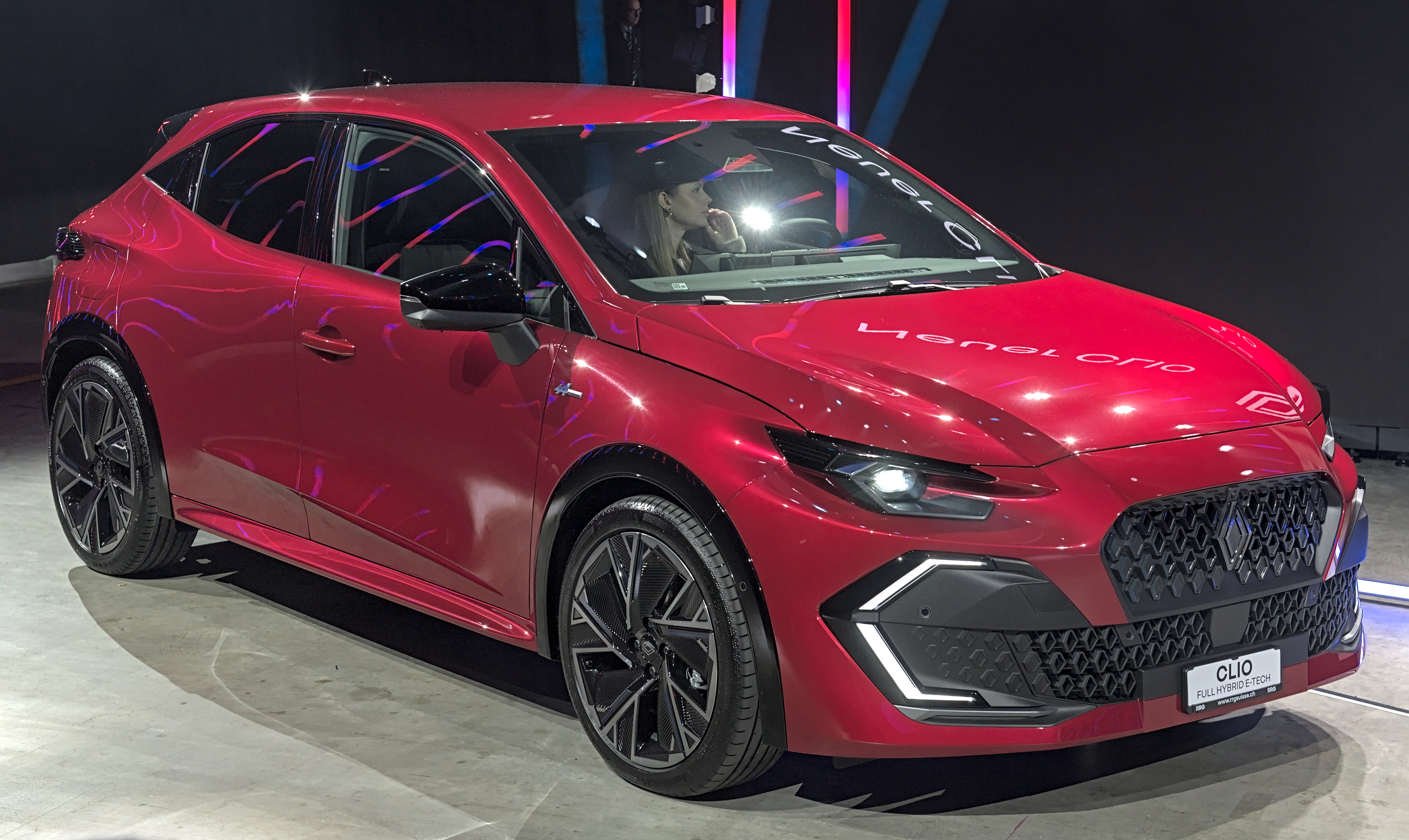
Renault Clio VI

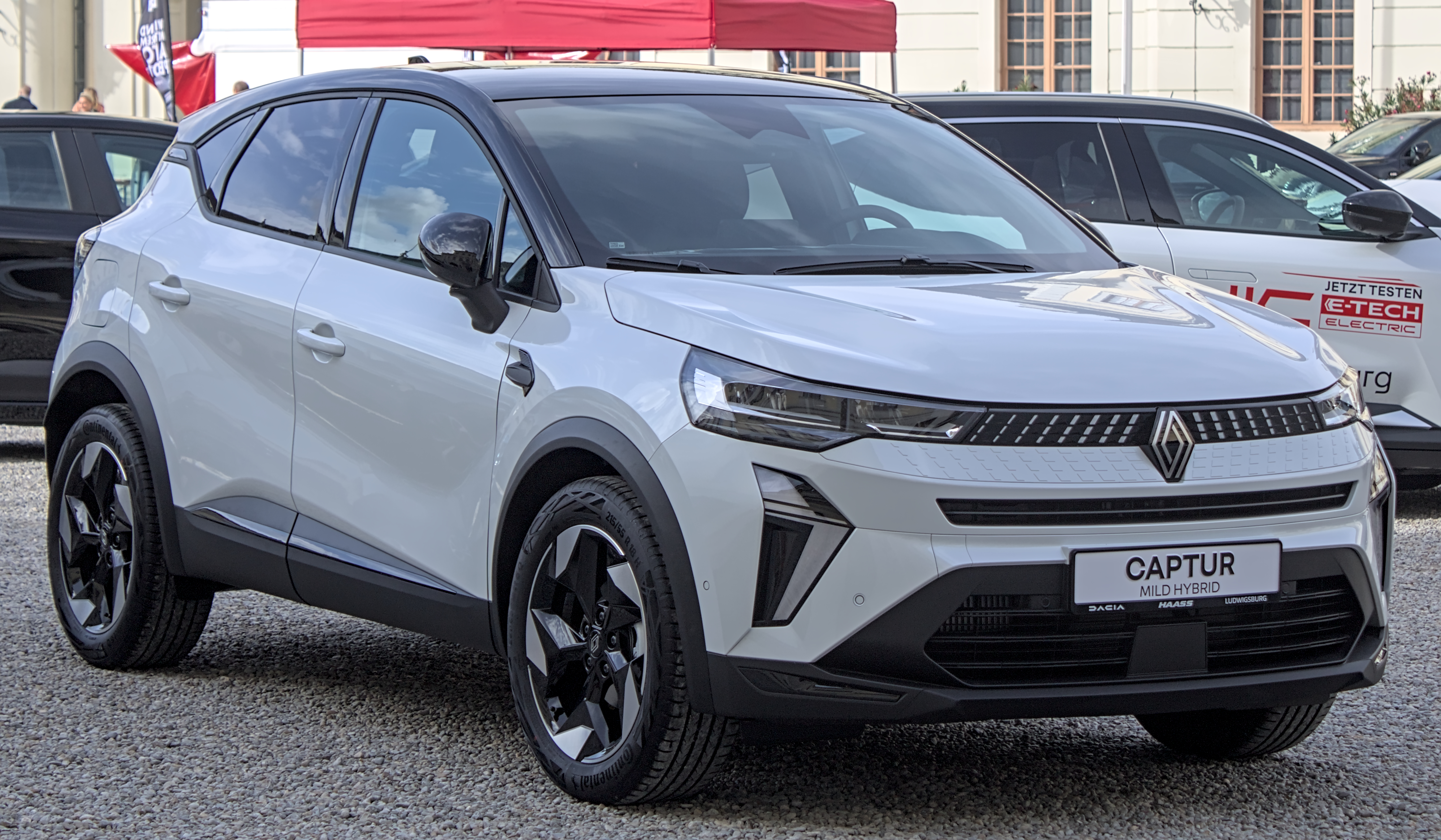
Renault Captur

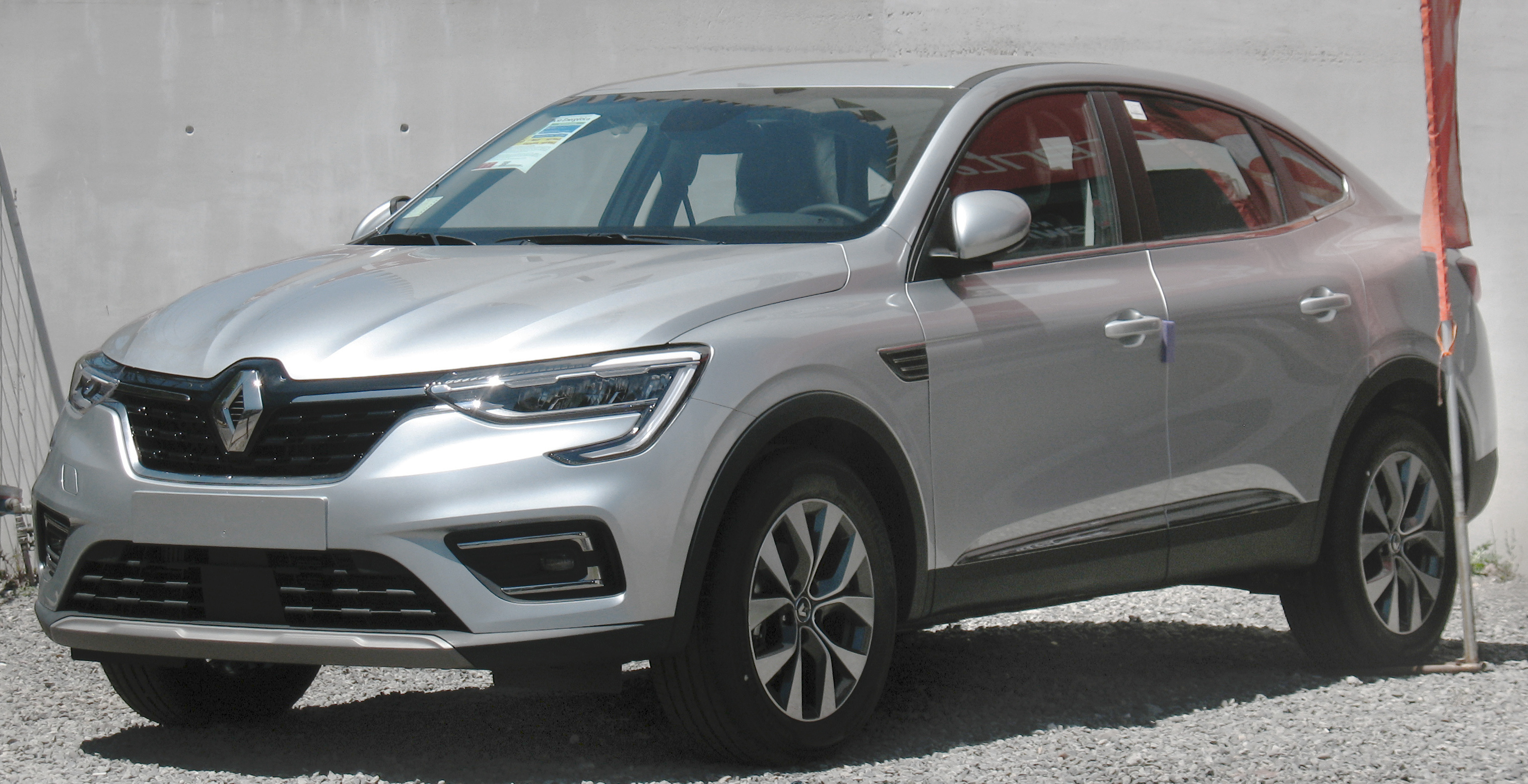
Renault Arkana

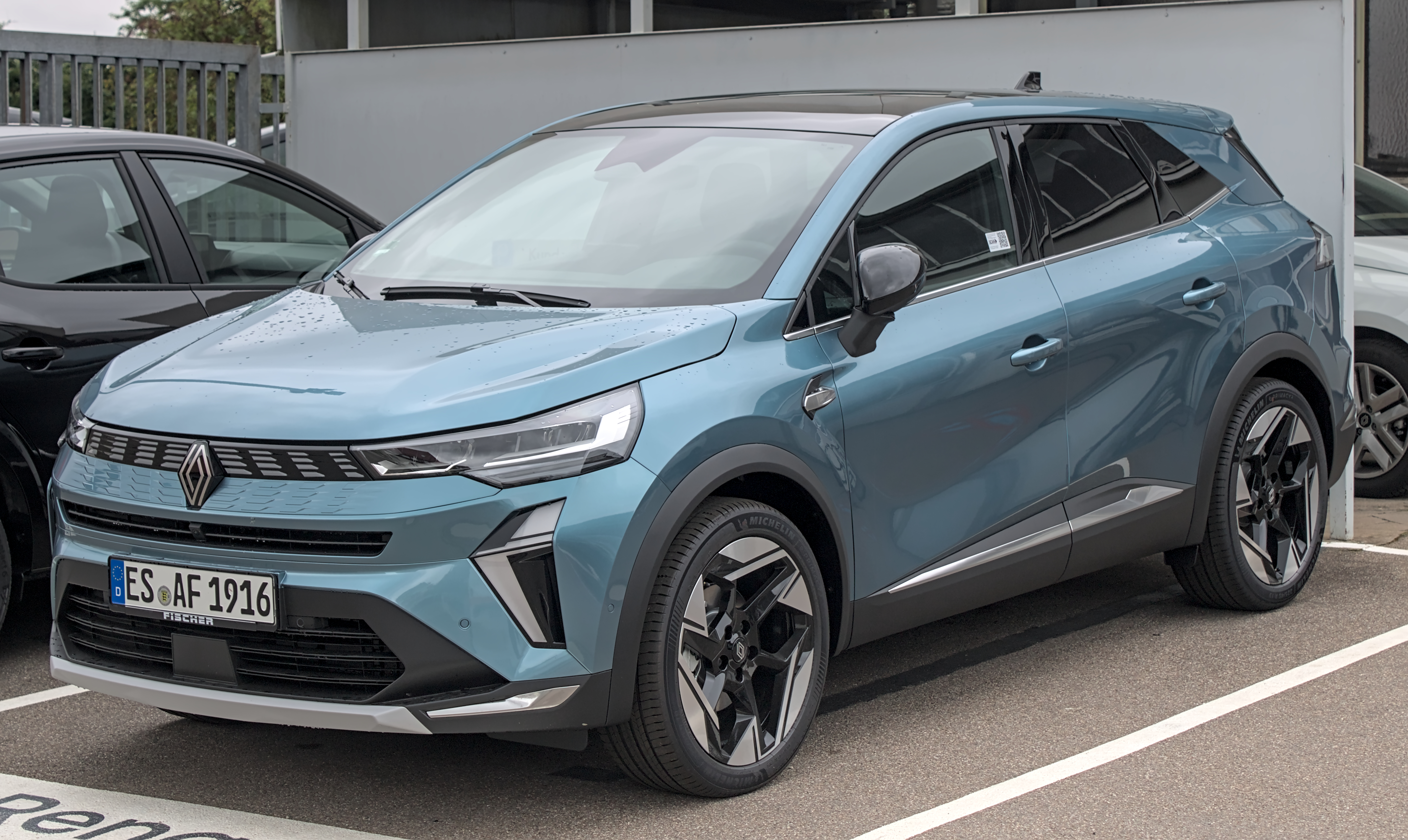
Renault Symbioz

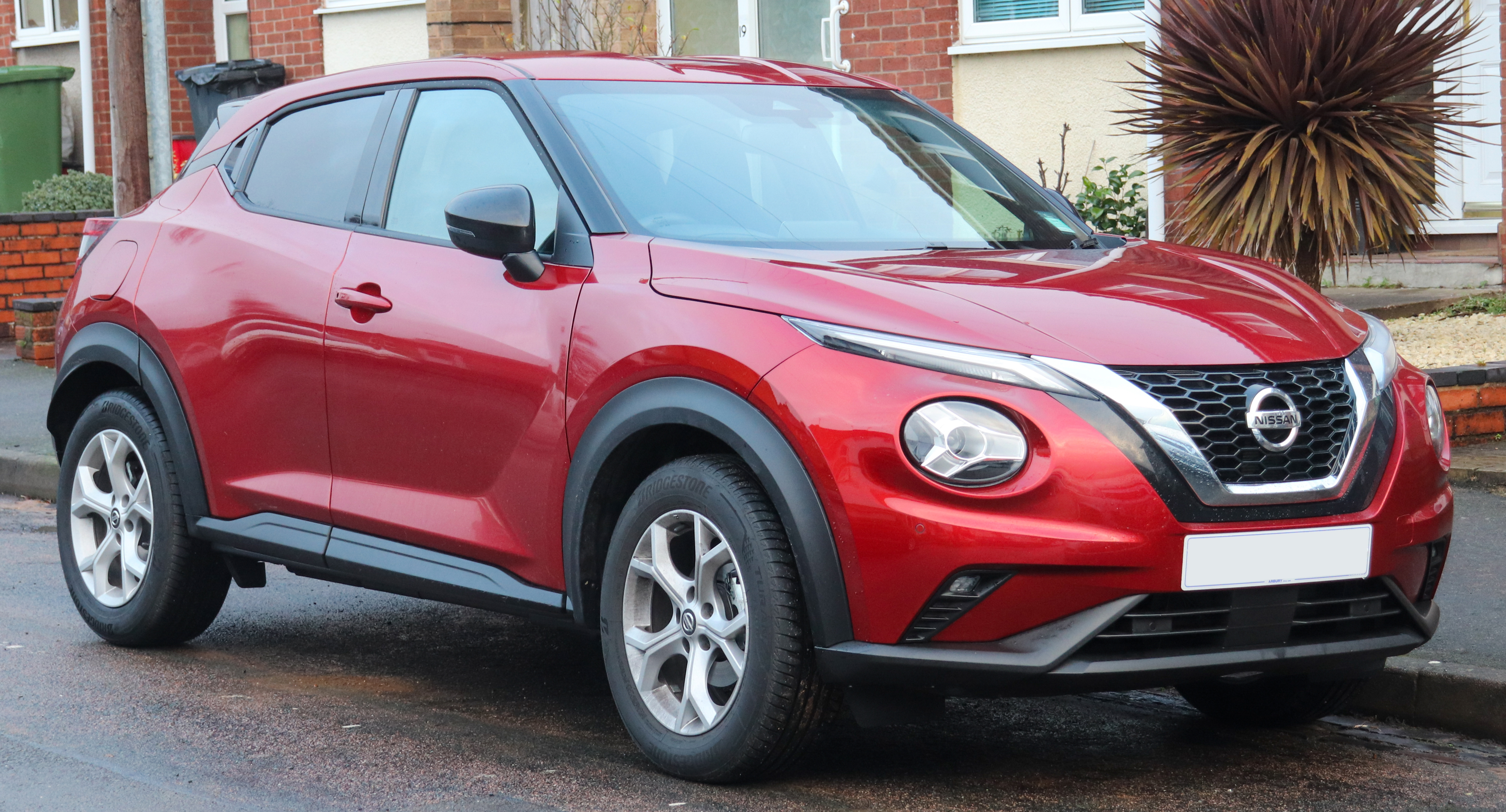
Nissan Juke

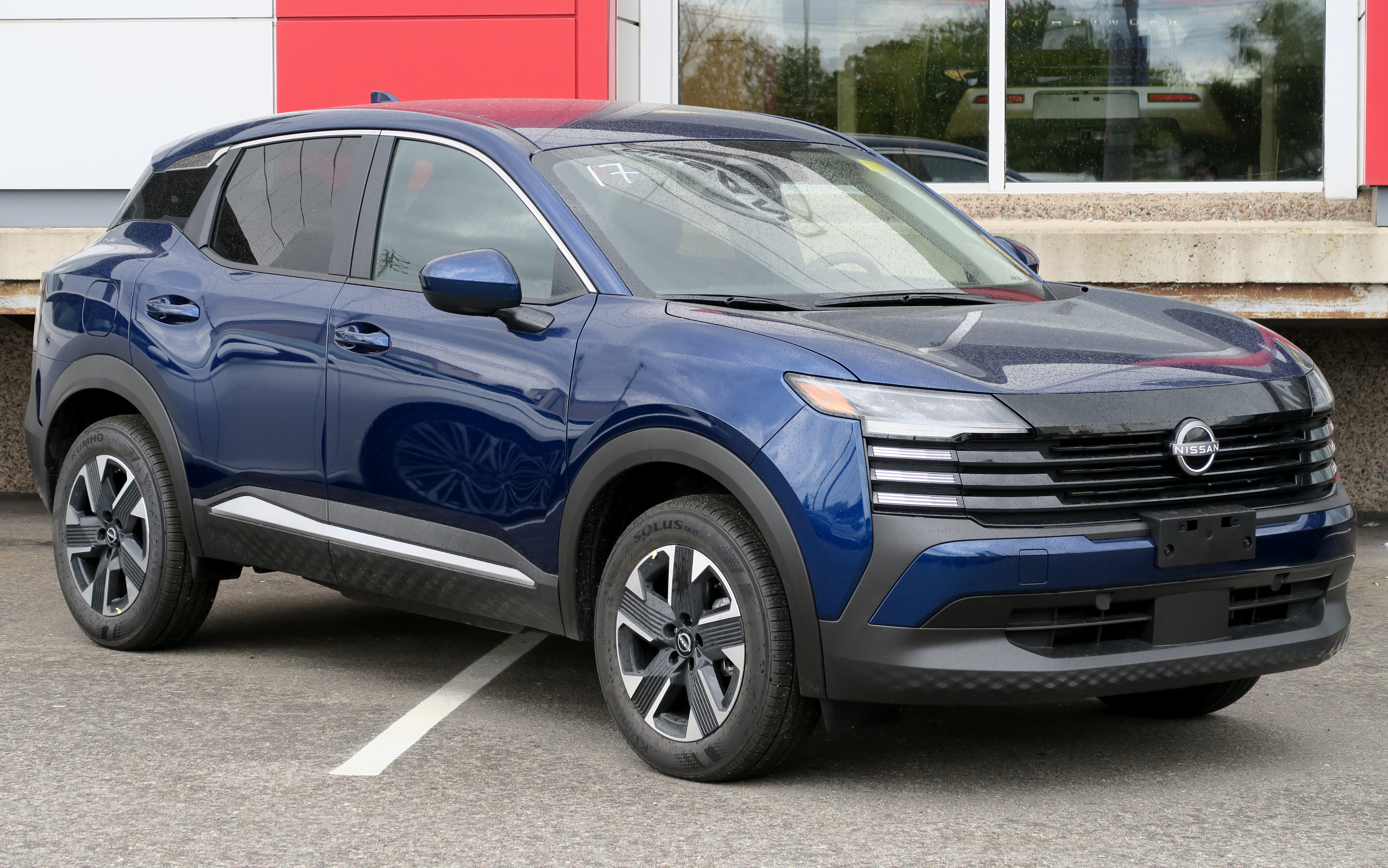
Nissan Kicks

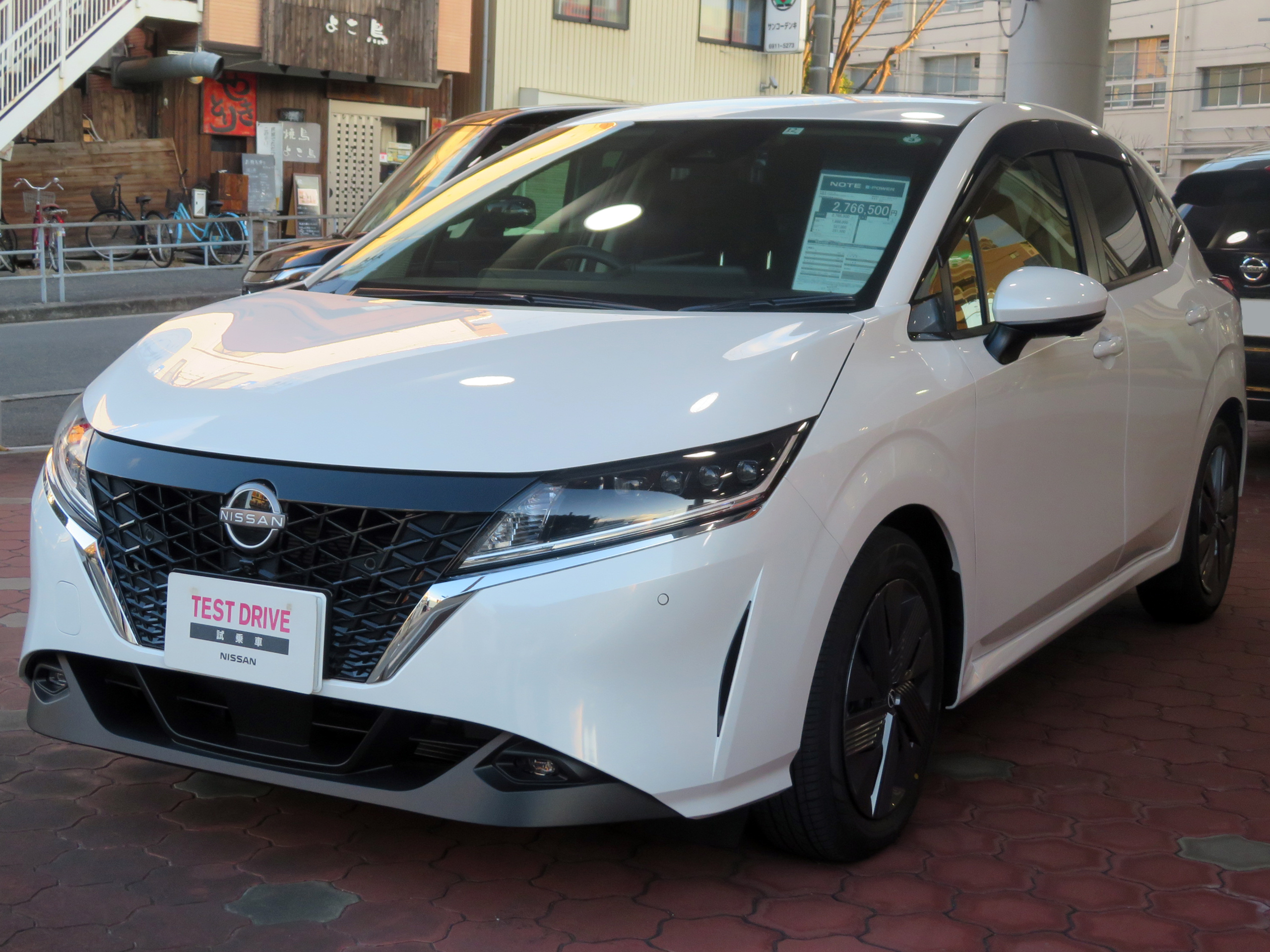
Nissan Note

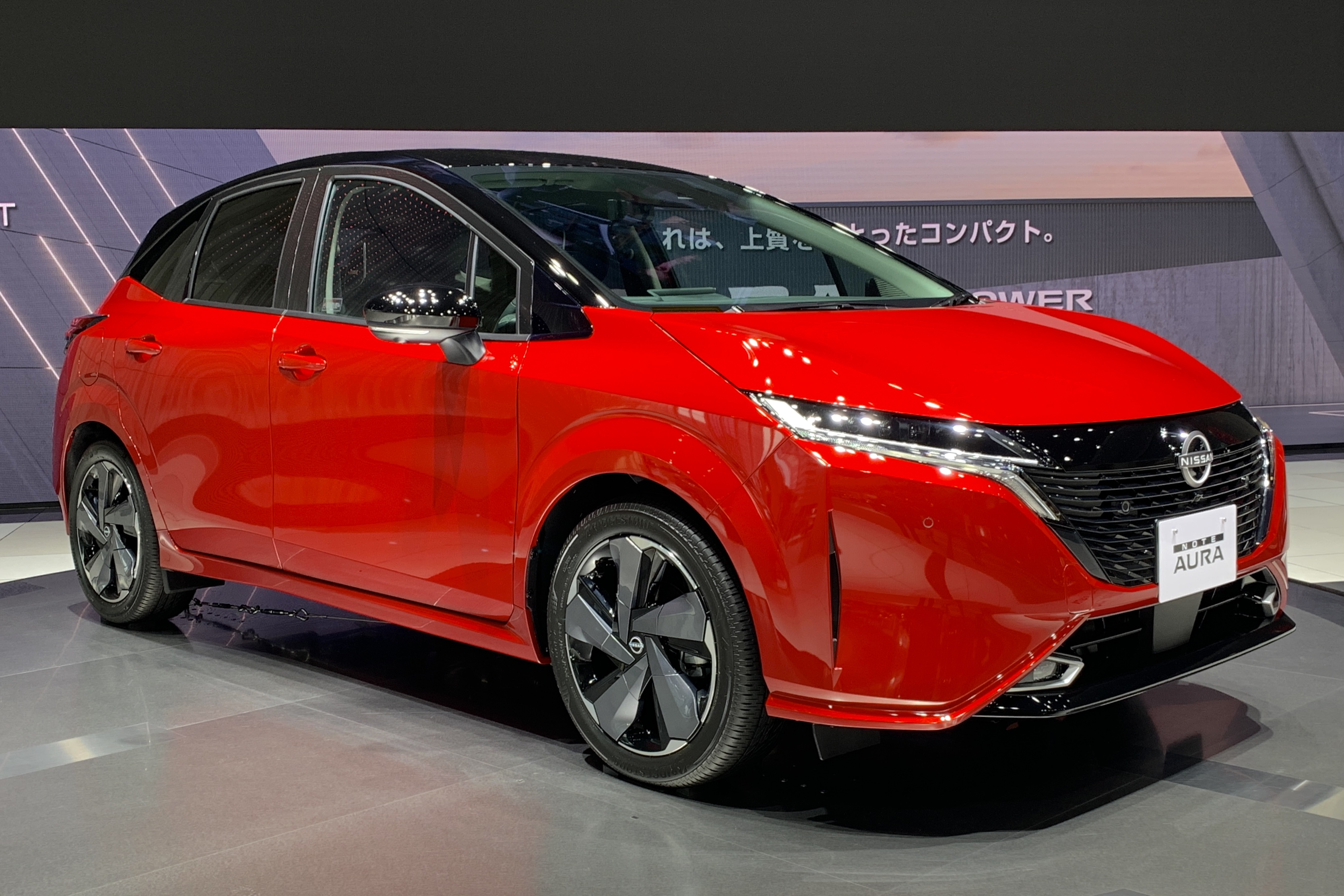
Nissan Note Aura

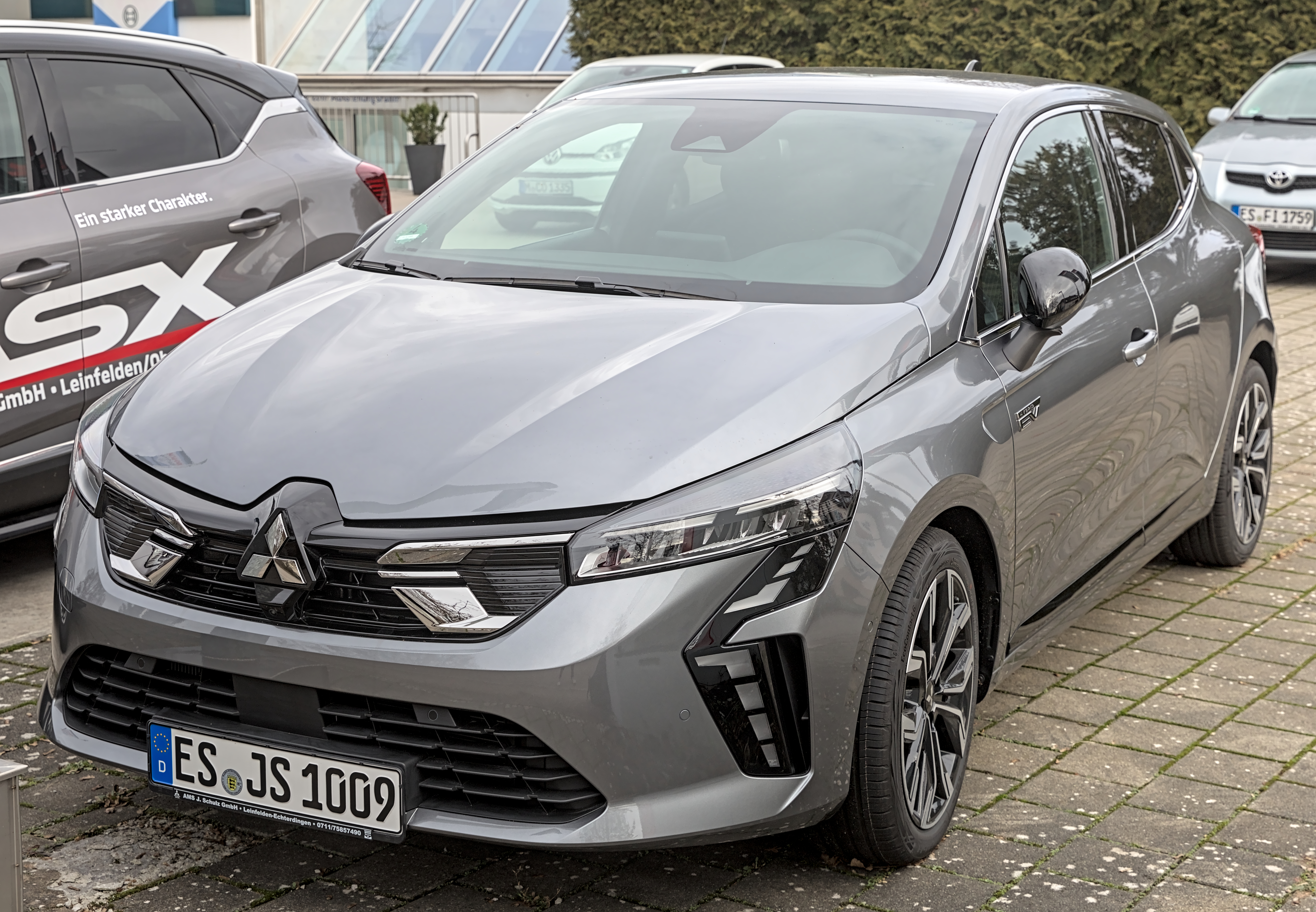
Mitsubishi Colt

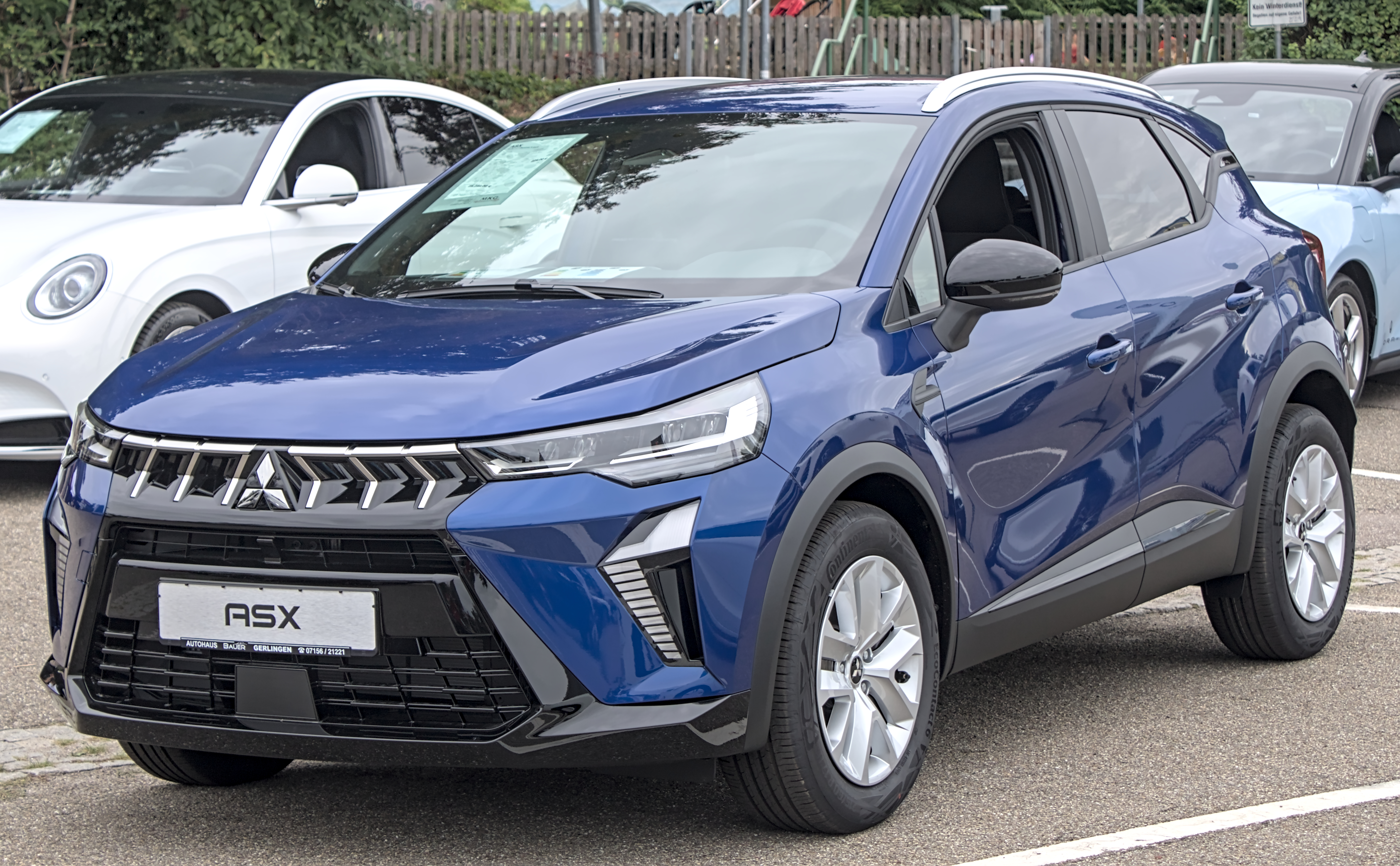
Mitsubishi ASX

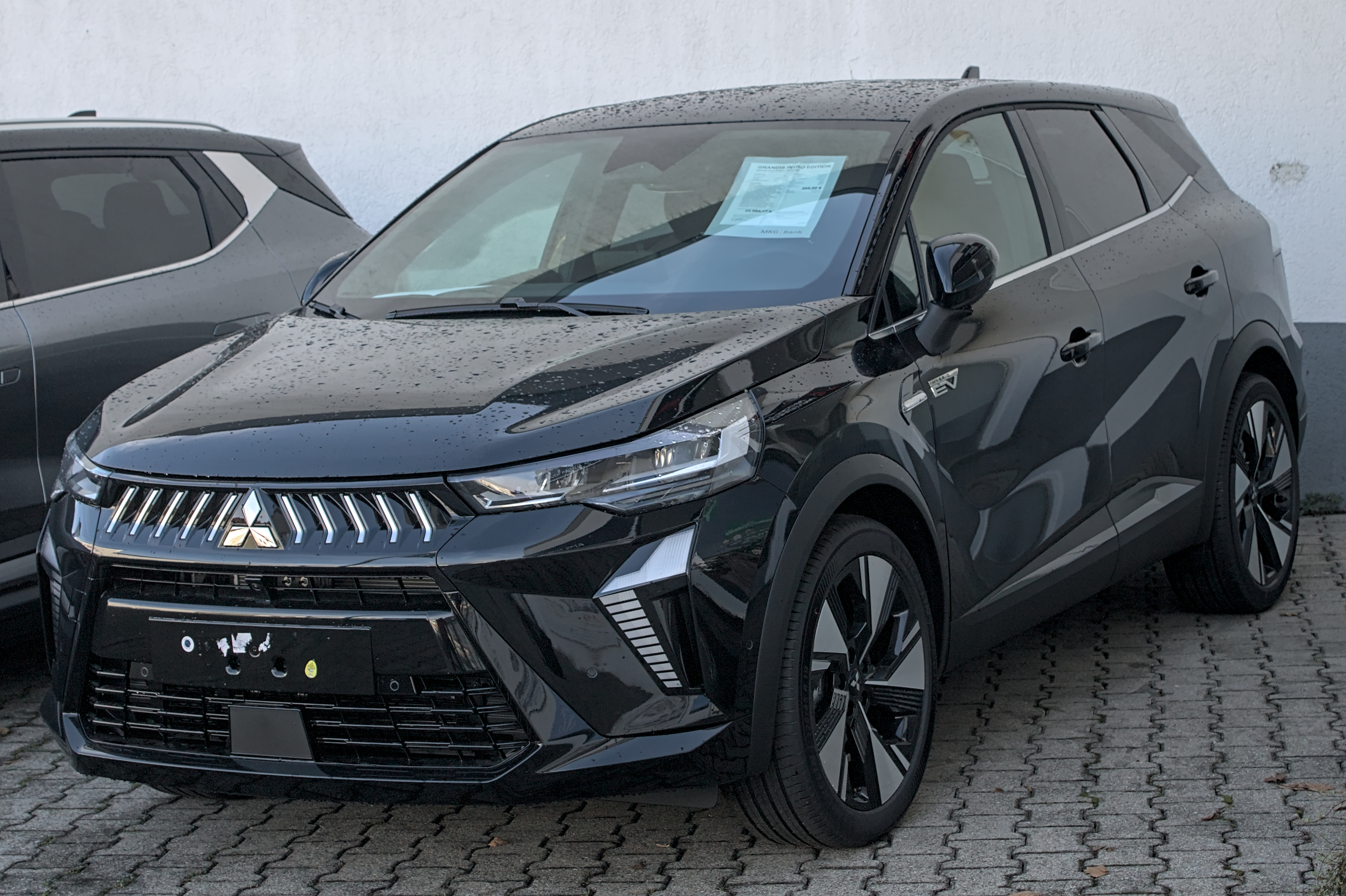
Mitsubishi Grandis

==== CMF-B LS ====
The CMF-B LS (low specifications) platform underpins budget models in the B-segment/supermini or subcompact segment. The platform replaces the B0 platform and M0 platform.

Vehicles using platform (calendar years):

- Dacia Logan III (2020–present)
  - Renault Taliant (2021–2025)
- Dacia Sandero III (2020–present)
- Dacia Jogger (2021–present)
- Dacia Duster III (2023–present) (Europe)
- Dacia Bigster (2024–present)
- Dacia Striker (2026, to commence)
- Lada Iskra (2025–present)
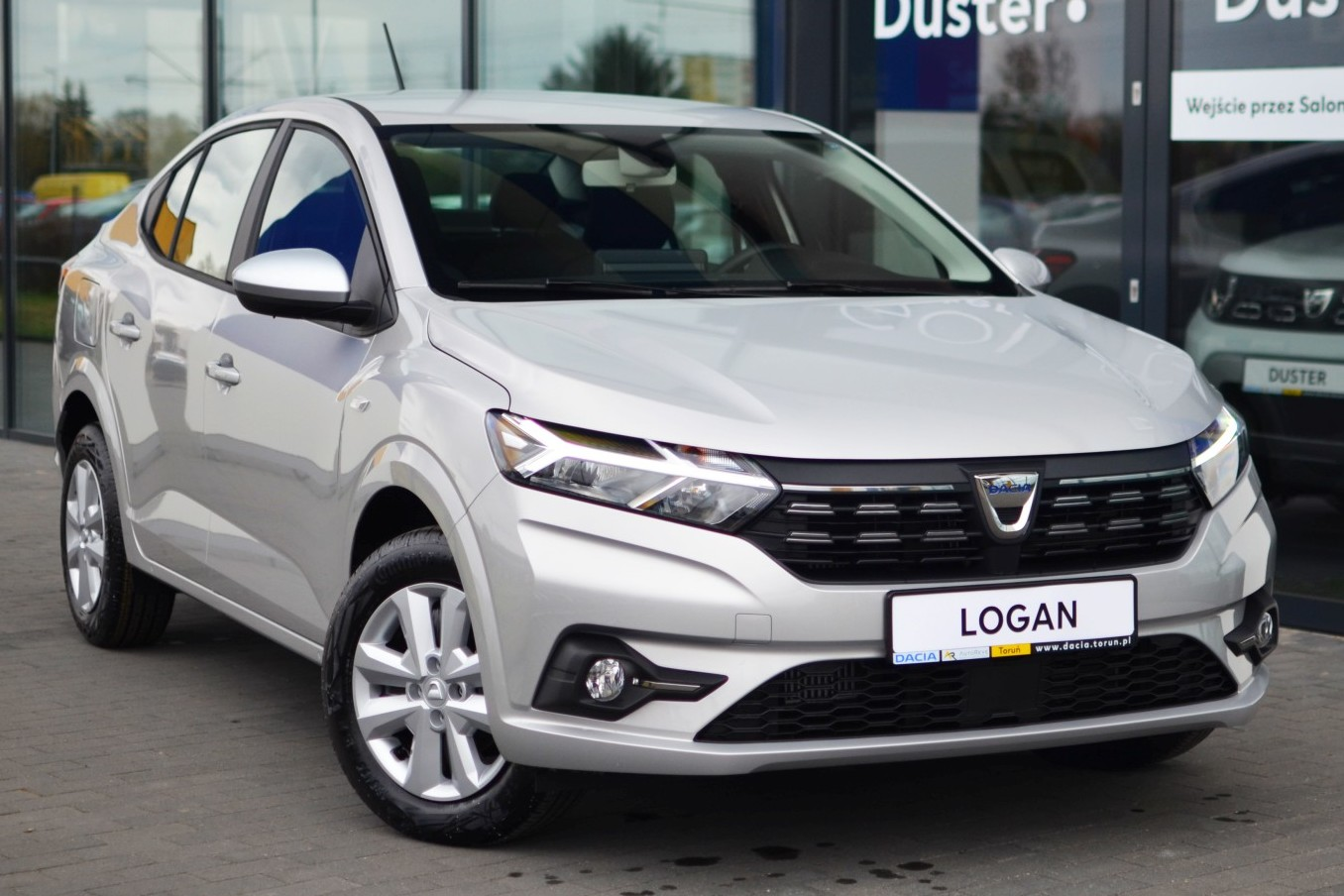
Dacia Logan

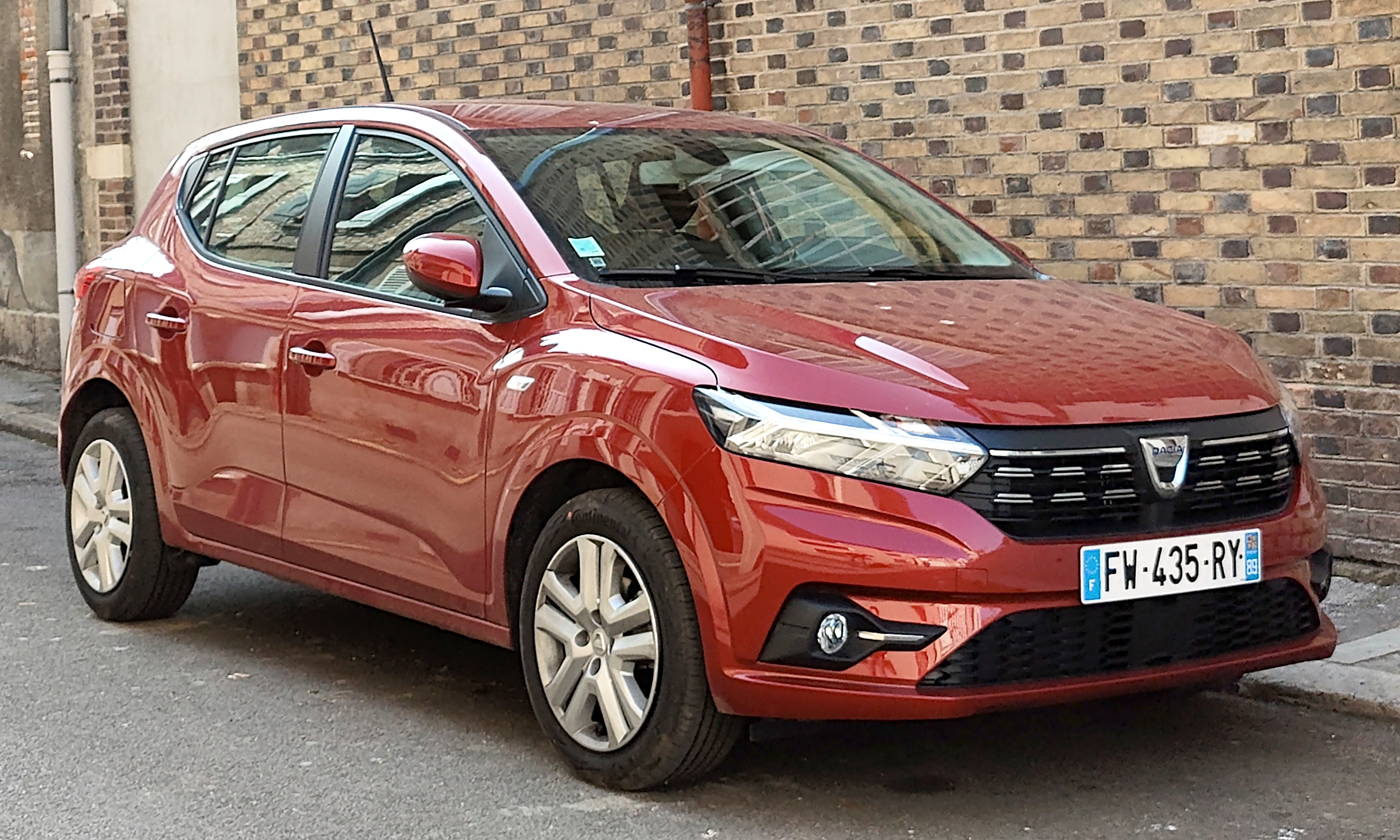
Dacia Sandero

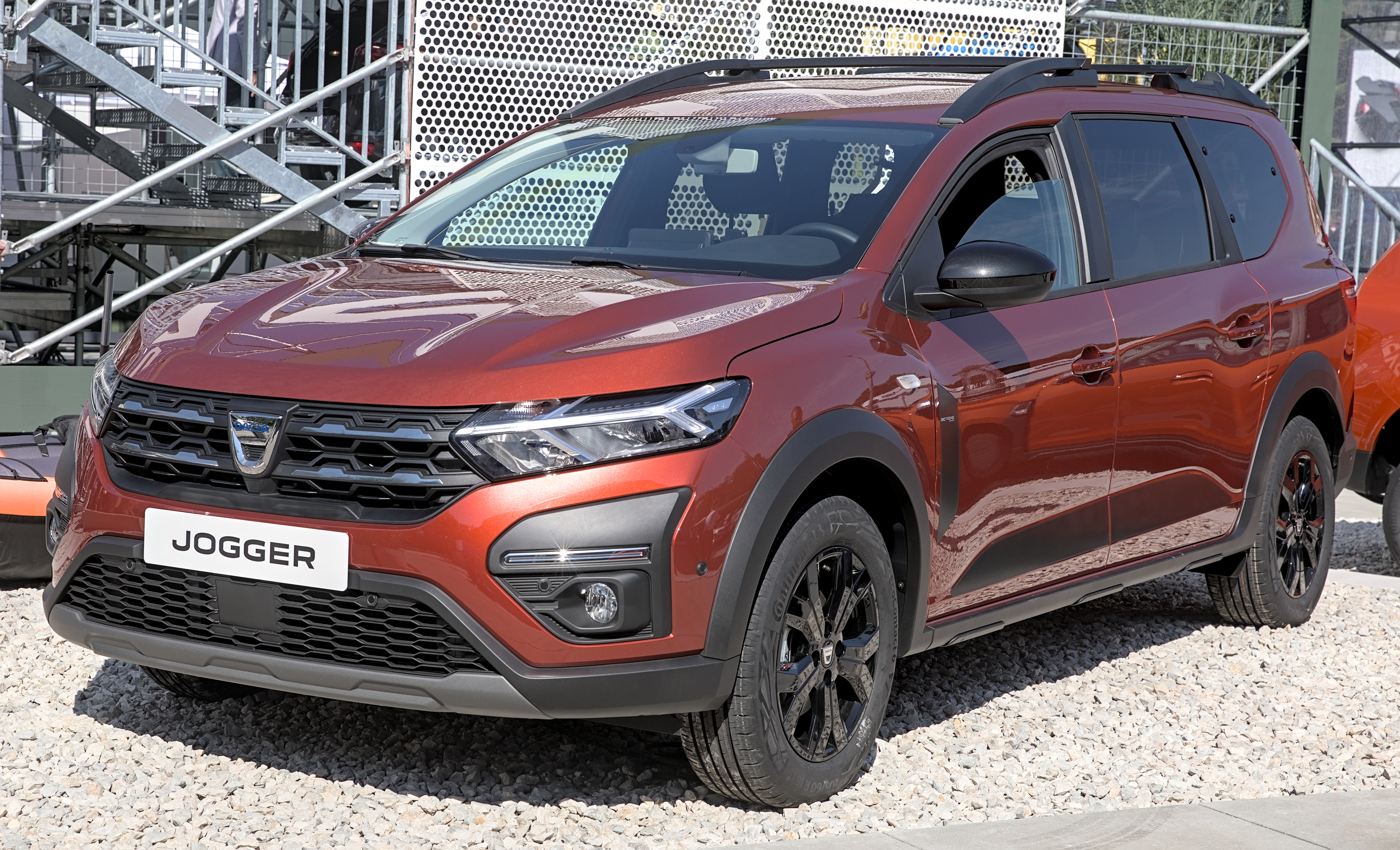
Dacia Jogger

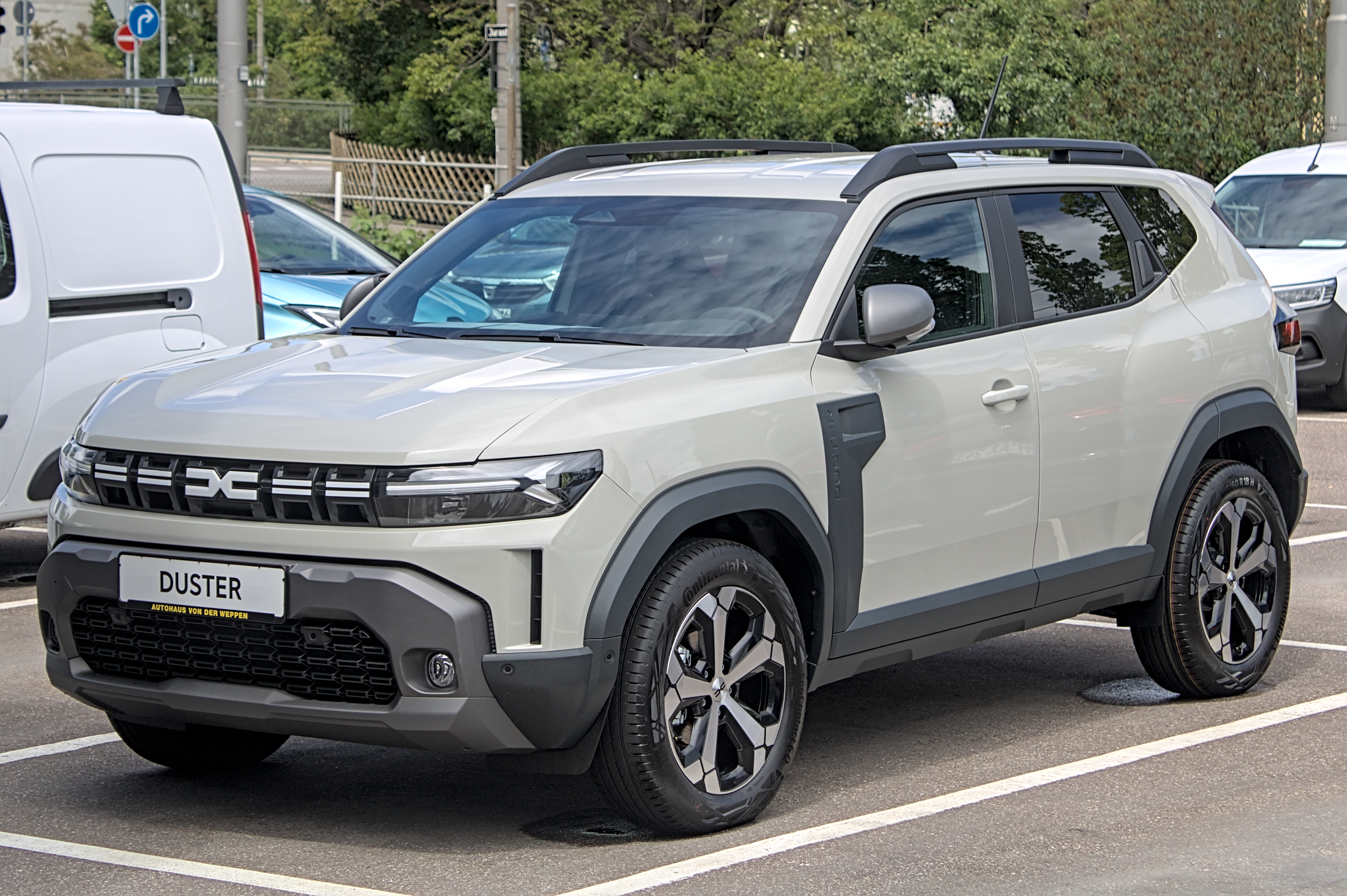
Dacia Duster III

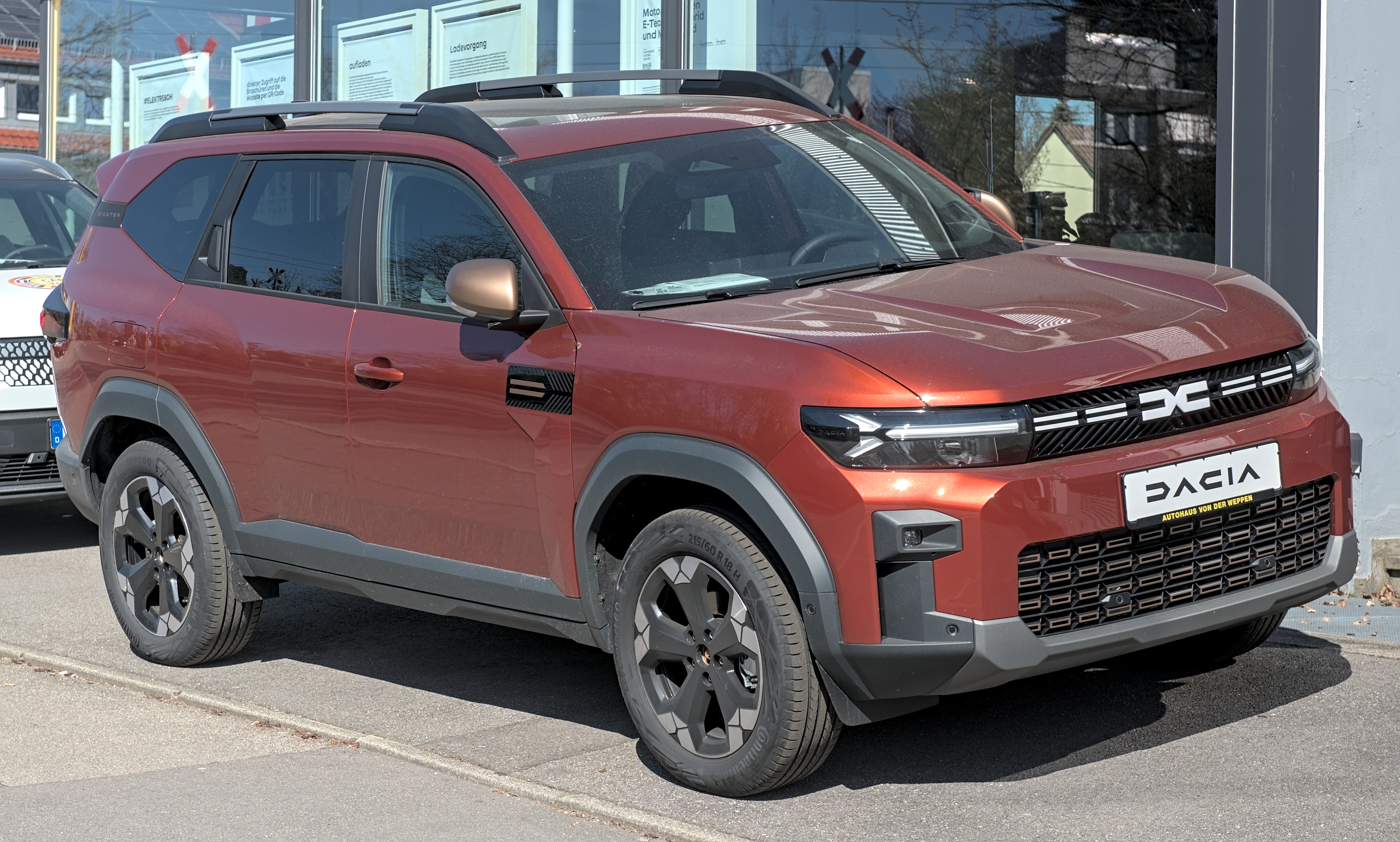
Dacia Bigster

Daica Striker

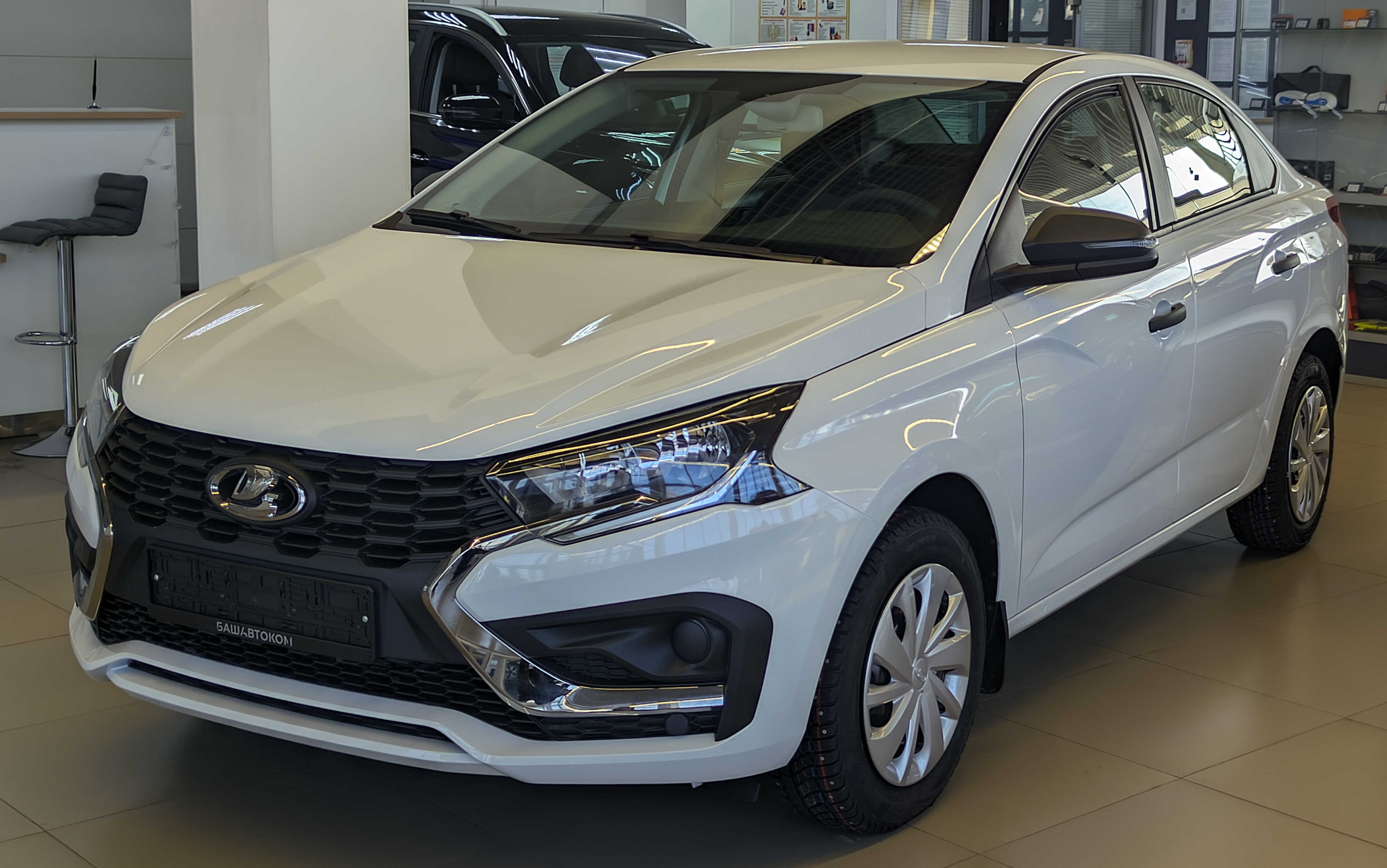
Lada Iskra

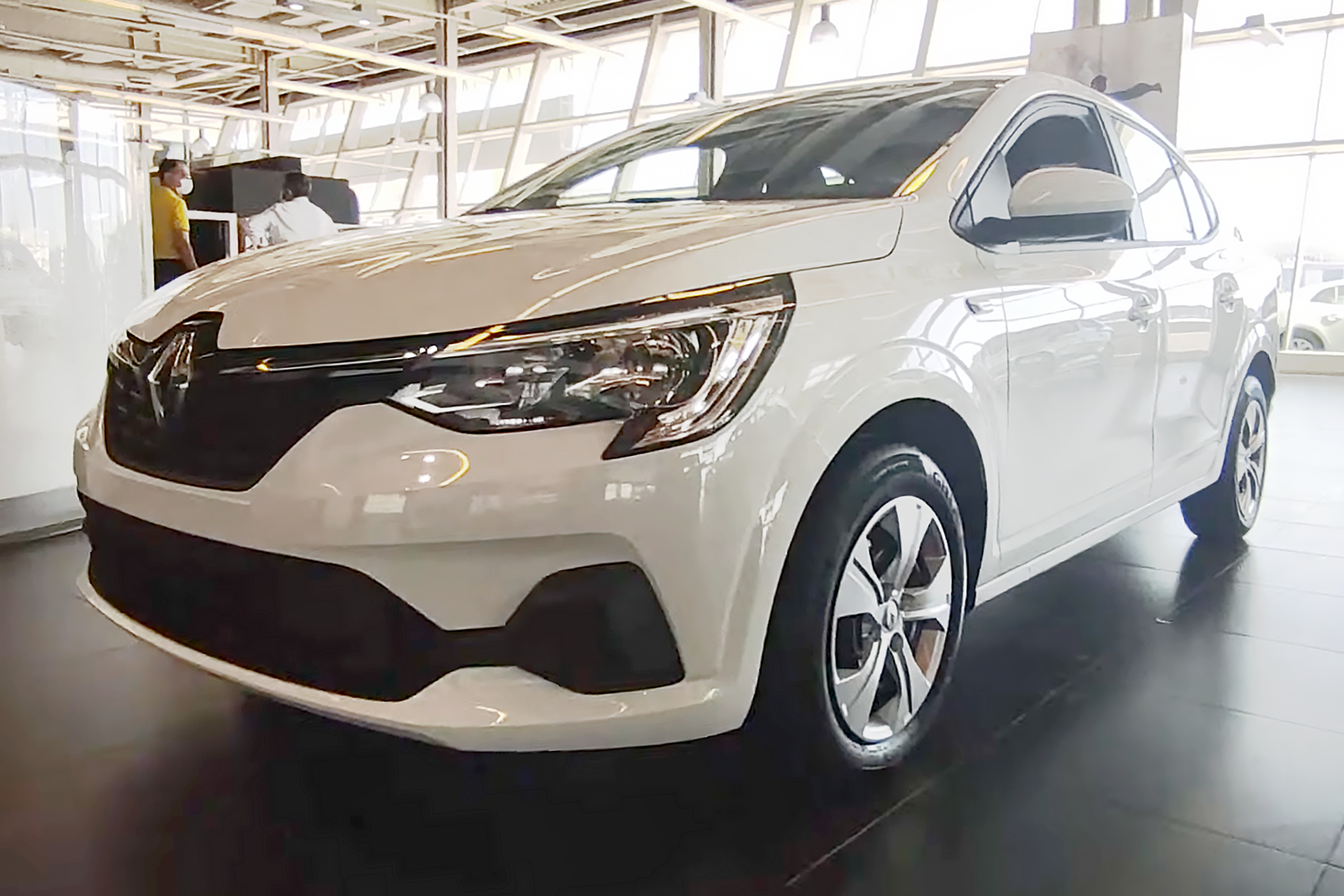
Renault Taliant

==== RGMP Small ====
The RGMP platform is presented as a new evolution of the CMF-B LS platform. It is aimed at emerging markets. The first vehicle using it is the Renault Kardian.

Vehicles using platform (calendar years):

- Renault Kardian (2023–present)
- Renault Boreal (2025–present)
- Renault Duster (India) (2026–present)
  - Nissan Tekton (2026–present)
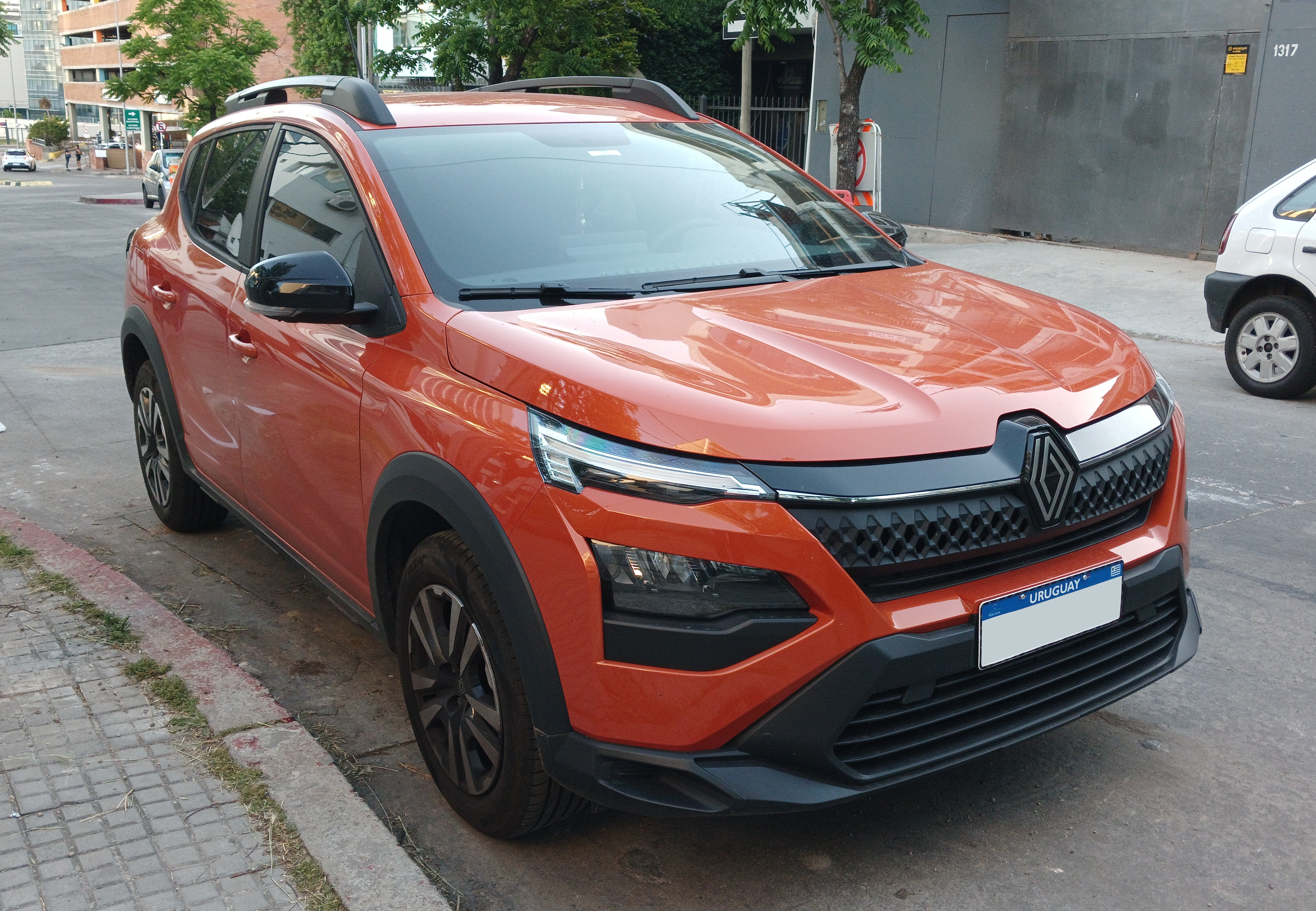
Renault Kardian

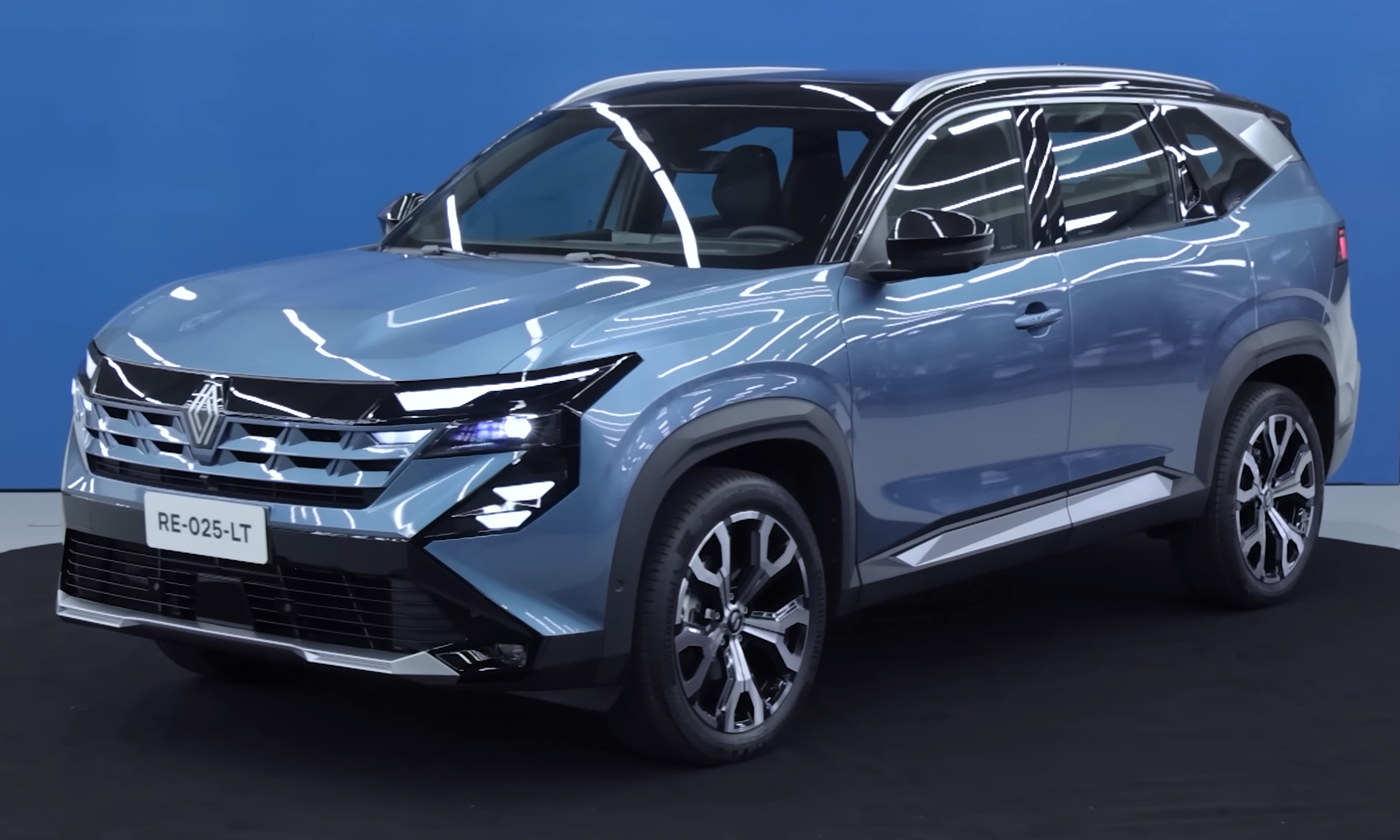
Renault Boreal

==== CMF-B EV / AmpR Small / RGEV Small ====
CMF-B EV (electric vehicle, also known as CMF-BEV, CMFB-EV or, since November 2023, as AmpR Small) is the CMF-B platform variant that has been adapted for low-cost B-segment battery electric vehicles. It shares approximately 1/2 the components of the CMF-B platform. The CMF-B EV platform was designed to reduce production cost and increase vehicle efficiency compared to the B-segment Renault Zoe, which used a bespoke platform. Two types of traction batteries using NMC chemistry are expected: "high-performance" and "affordable" variants, with the goal of reducing battery cost below US$80/kW-hr by 2030. In November 2023, Renault subsidiary Ampere renamed this platform to AmpR Small. With the Twingo E-Tech, an LFP battery option becomes available. In December 2025, it was announced that Ford would produce two new cars for the European market based on the platform.. The platform was renamed again to RGEV Small, after Ampere was absorbed back into Renault.

Vehicles using platform (calendar years):

- Renault Twingo E-Tech (2026–present)
  - Nissan Pixo (2027–present)
- Dacia Spring Electric (2027–present)
- Renault 4 E-Tech (2025–present)
- Renault 5 E-Tech (2024–present)
  - Alpine A290 (2024–present)
  - Nissan Micra (2025–present)
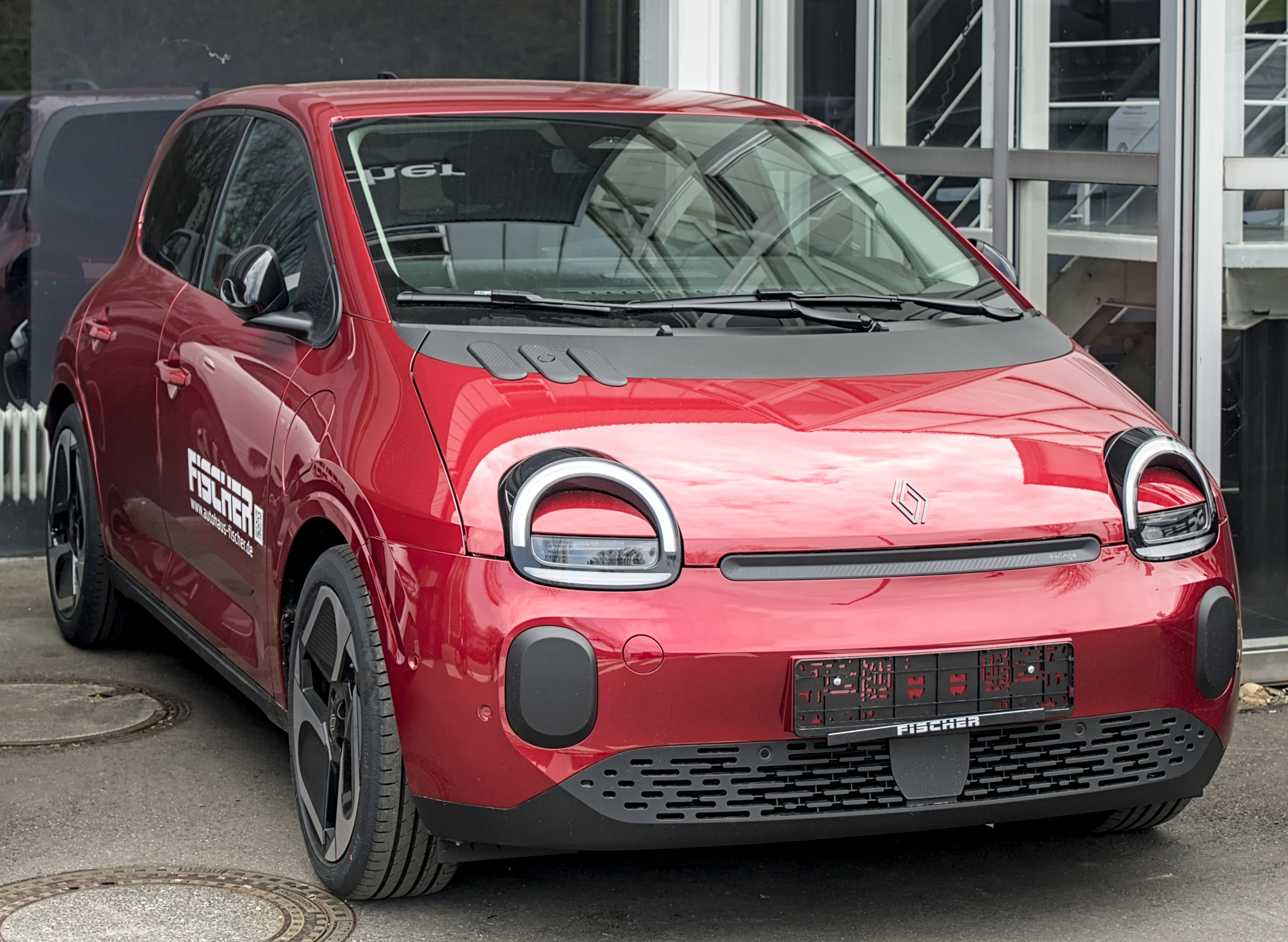
Renault Twingo E-Tech

Nissan Pixo EV

Dacia Spring Electric

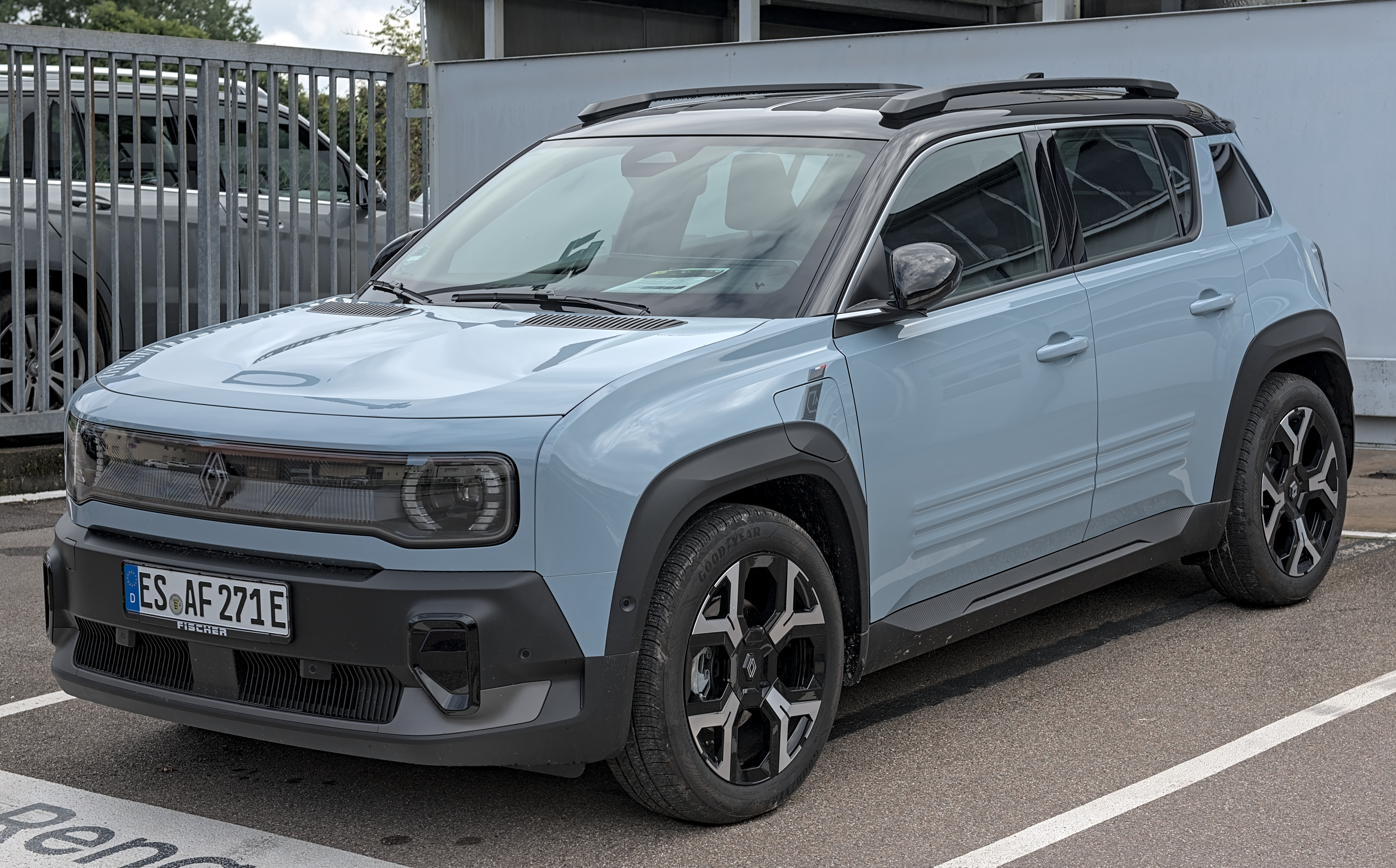
Renault 4 E-Tech

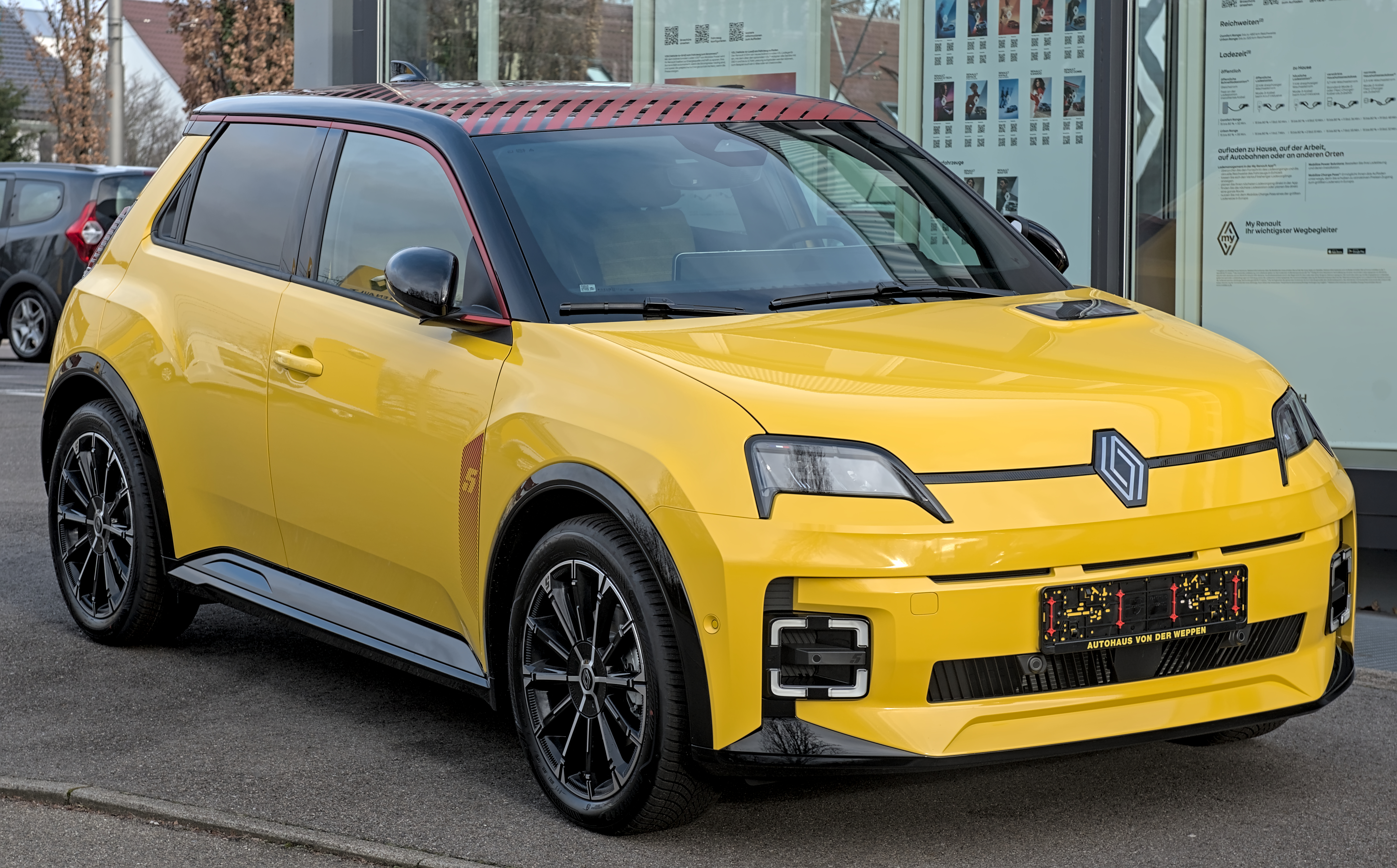
Renault 5 E-Tech

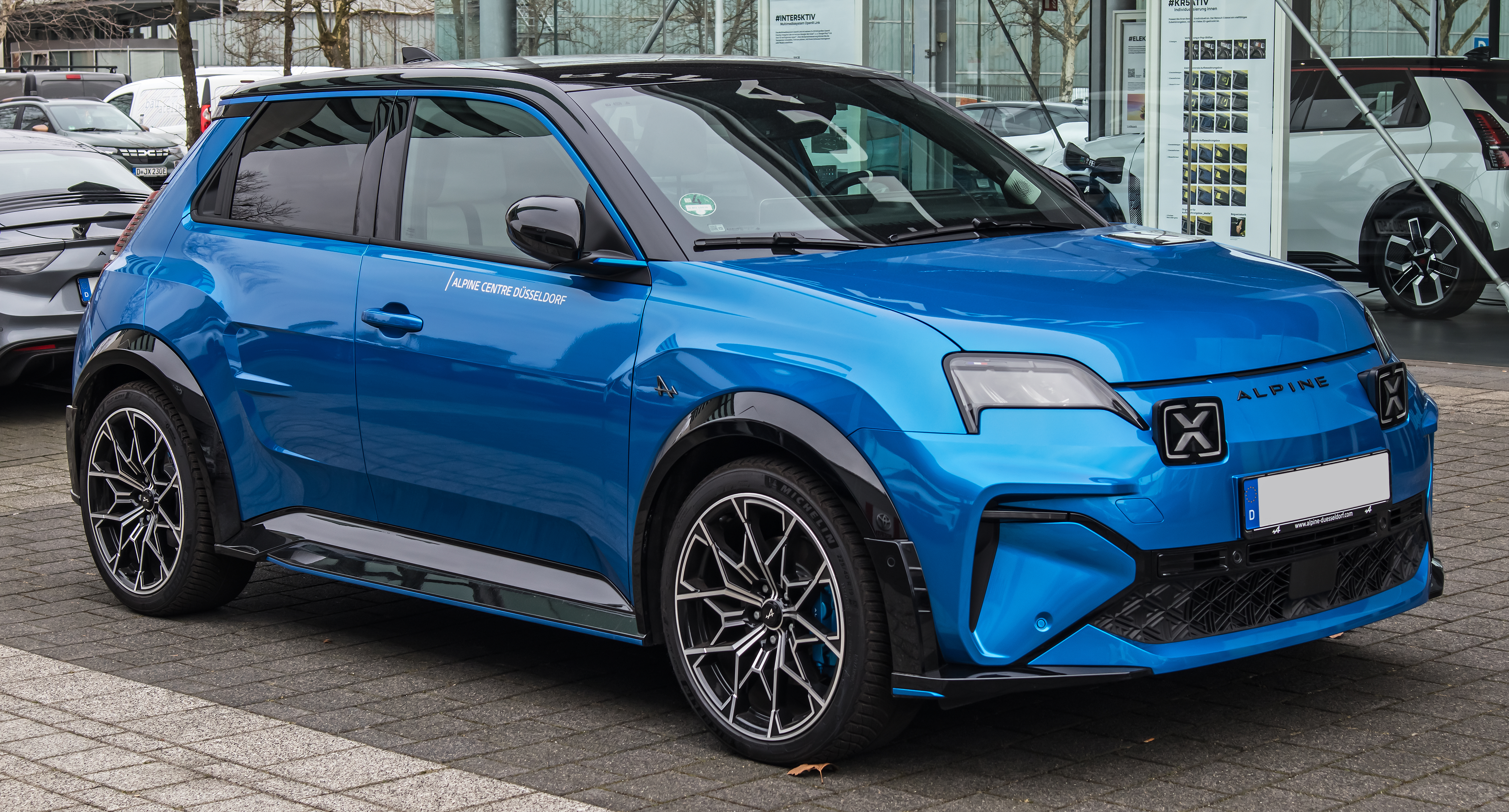
Alpine A290

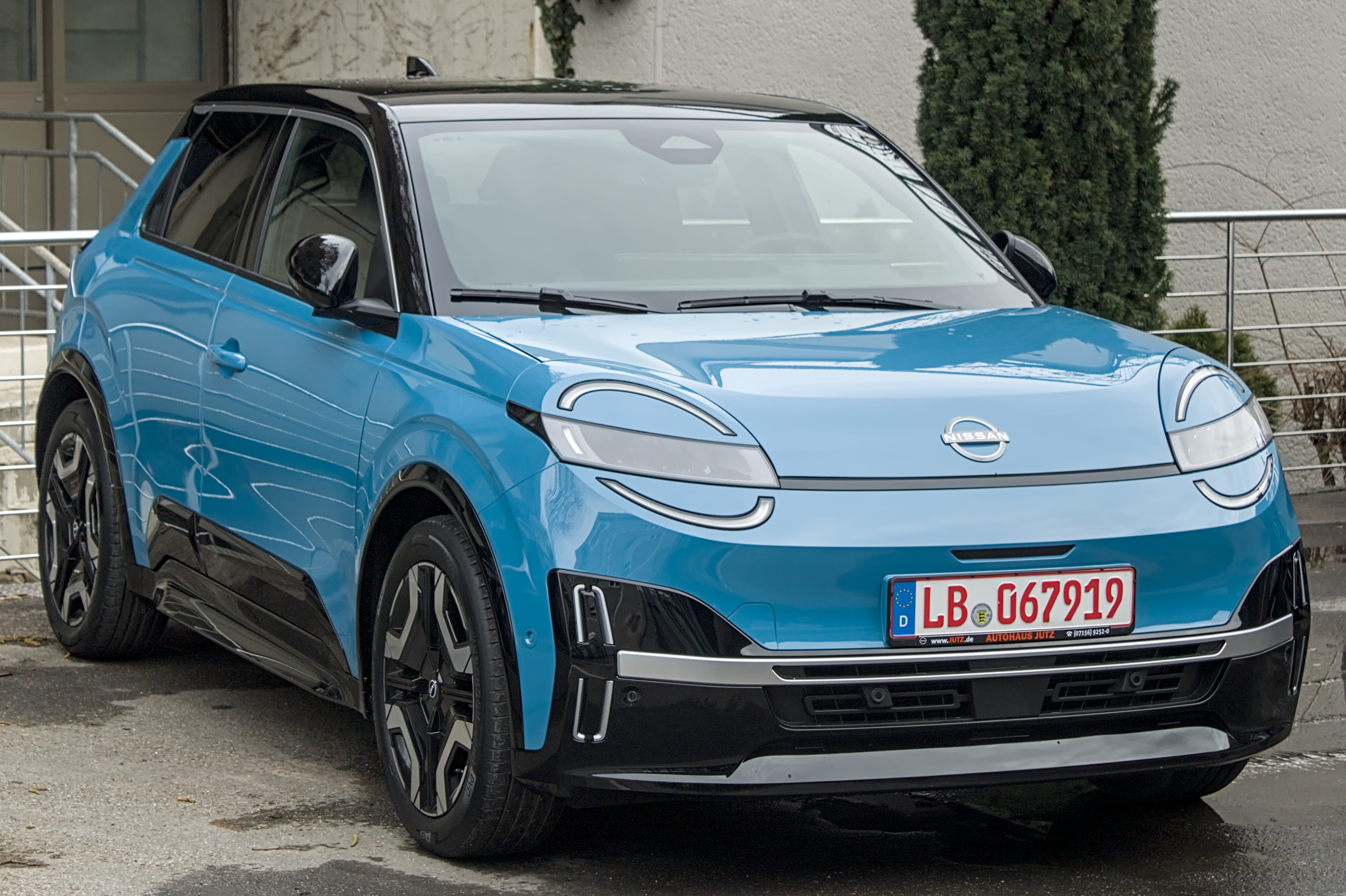
Nissan Micra EV

=== CMF-C/D ===
The CMF-C/D platform underpins various vehicles from C-segment upwards. The platform replaces the C platform and D platform.

Vehicles using platform (calendar years):

- Renault Espace V (2015–2023)
- Renault Kadjar (2015–2022)
- Renault Talisman/Renault Samsung SM6 (2015–2025)
- Renault Mégane IV (2016–2024)
- Renault Koleos II/Renault Samsung QM6 (2016–2025)
- Renault Scénic IV (2016–2022)
- Renault Austral (2022–present)
- Renault Espace VI (2023–present)
- Renault Rafale (2023–present)
- Renault Kangoo III (2021–present)
  - Kangoo E-Tech Electric (2021–present)
- Nissan Qashqai/Rogue Sport — J11 (2013–2022)
- Nissan X-Trail/Rogue — T32 (2013–2020)
- Nissan Pulsar/Tiida — C13 (2014–present)
- Nissan Sentra/Sylphy — B18 (2019–present)
- Nissan Sentra/Sylphy — B19 (2026–present)
- Nissan X-Trail/Rogue — T33 (2020–present)
- Nissan X-Trail/Rogue — T34 (2026–present)
- Nissan Qashqai — J12 (2021–present)
- Nissan Townstar — (2021–present)
  - Townstar EV — (2021–present)
- Mitsubishi Outlander — GN (2021–present)
  - Nissan Rogue Plug-in Hybrid — (2026–present)
- Mercedes-Benz Citan/T-Class — (2021–2026)
  - Mercedes-Benz eCitan/EQT — (2021–2026)
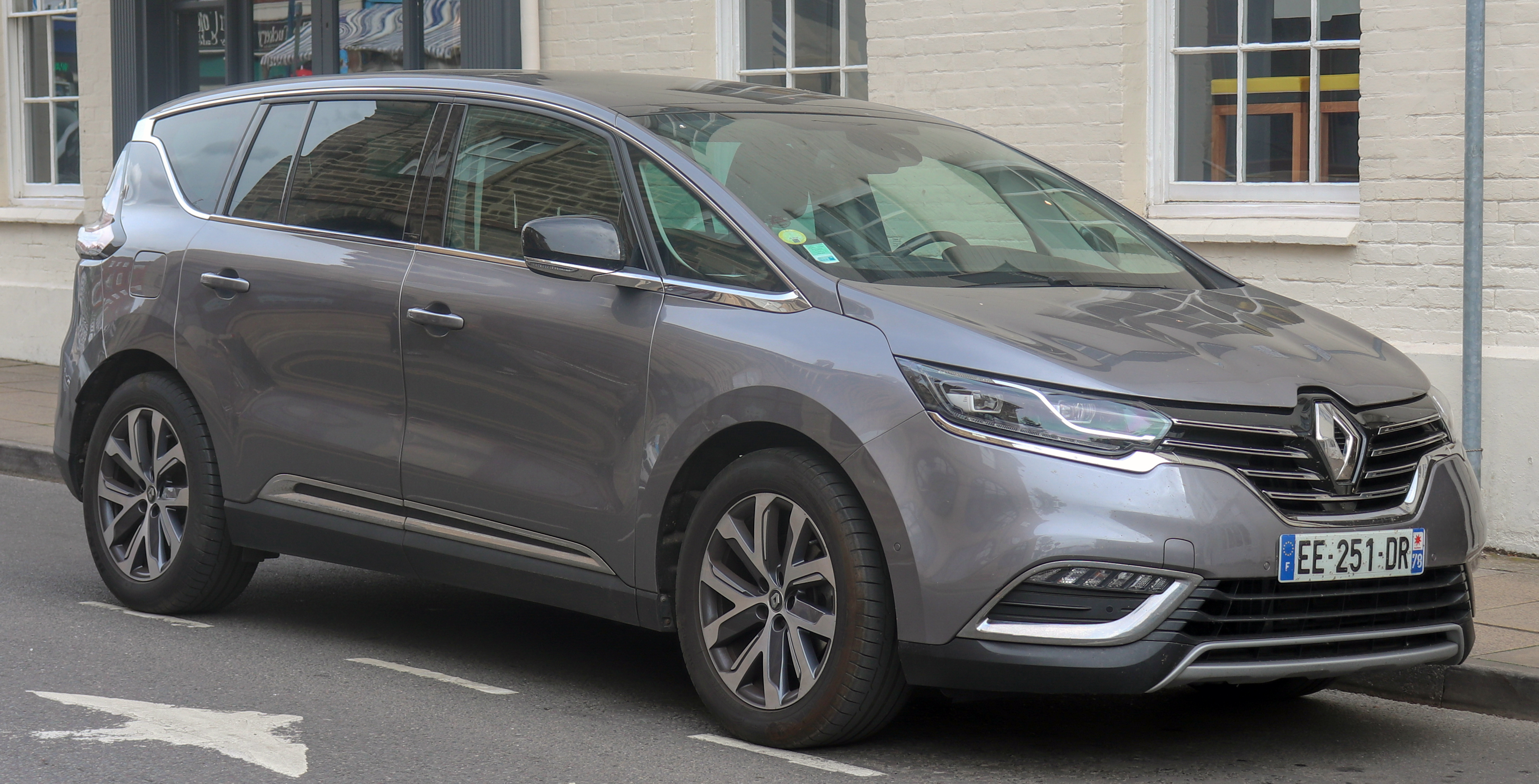
Renault Espace V

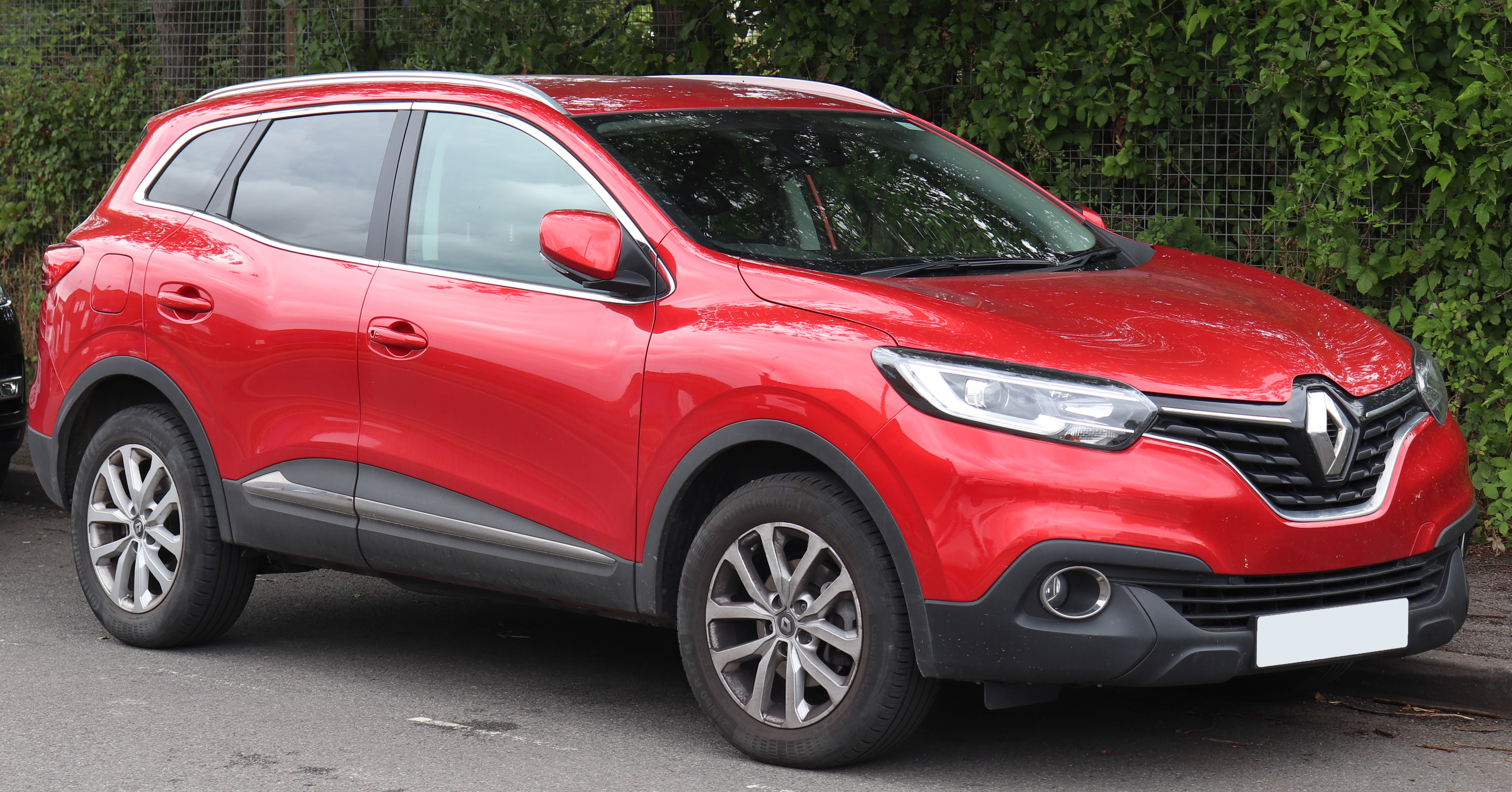
Renault Kadjar

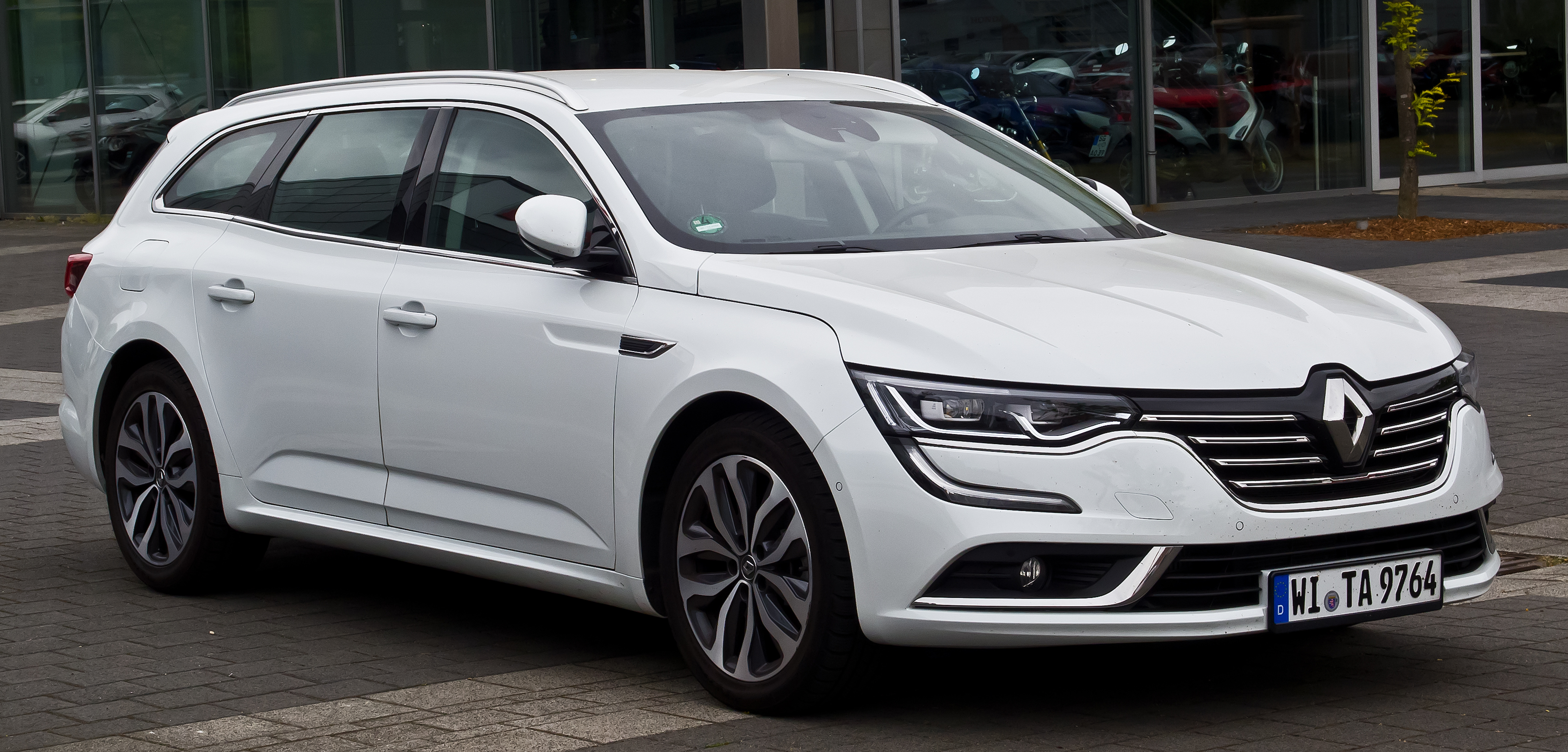
Renault Talisman

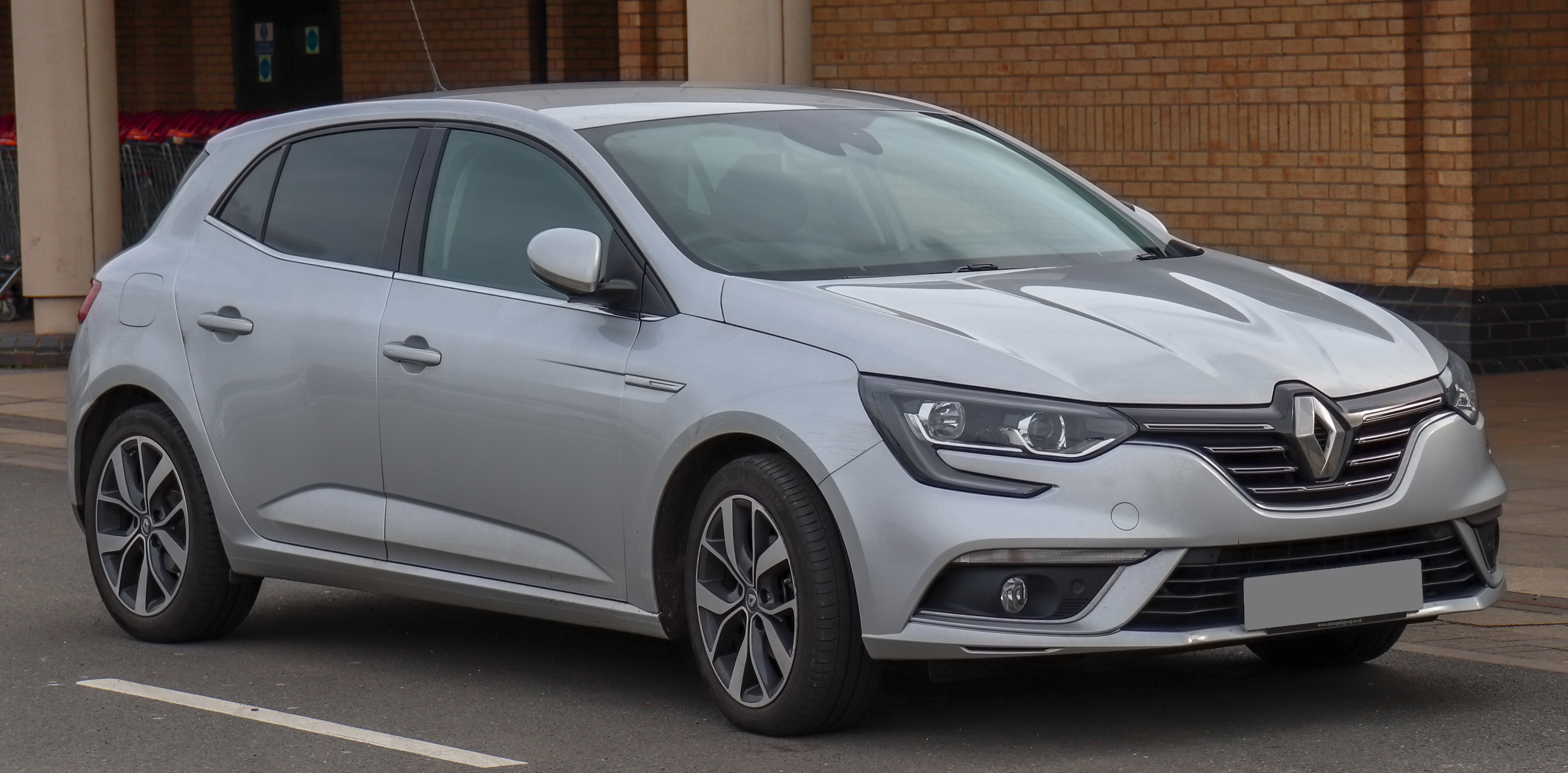
Renault Mégane

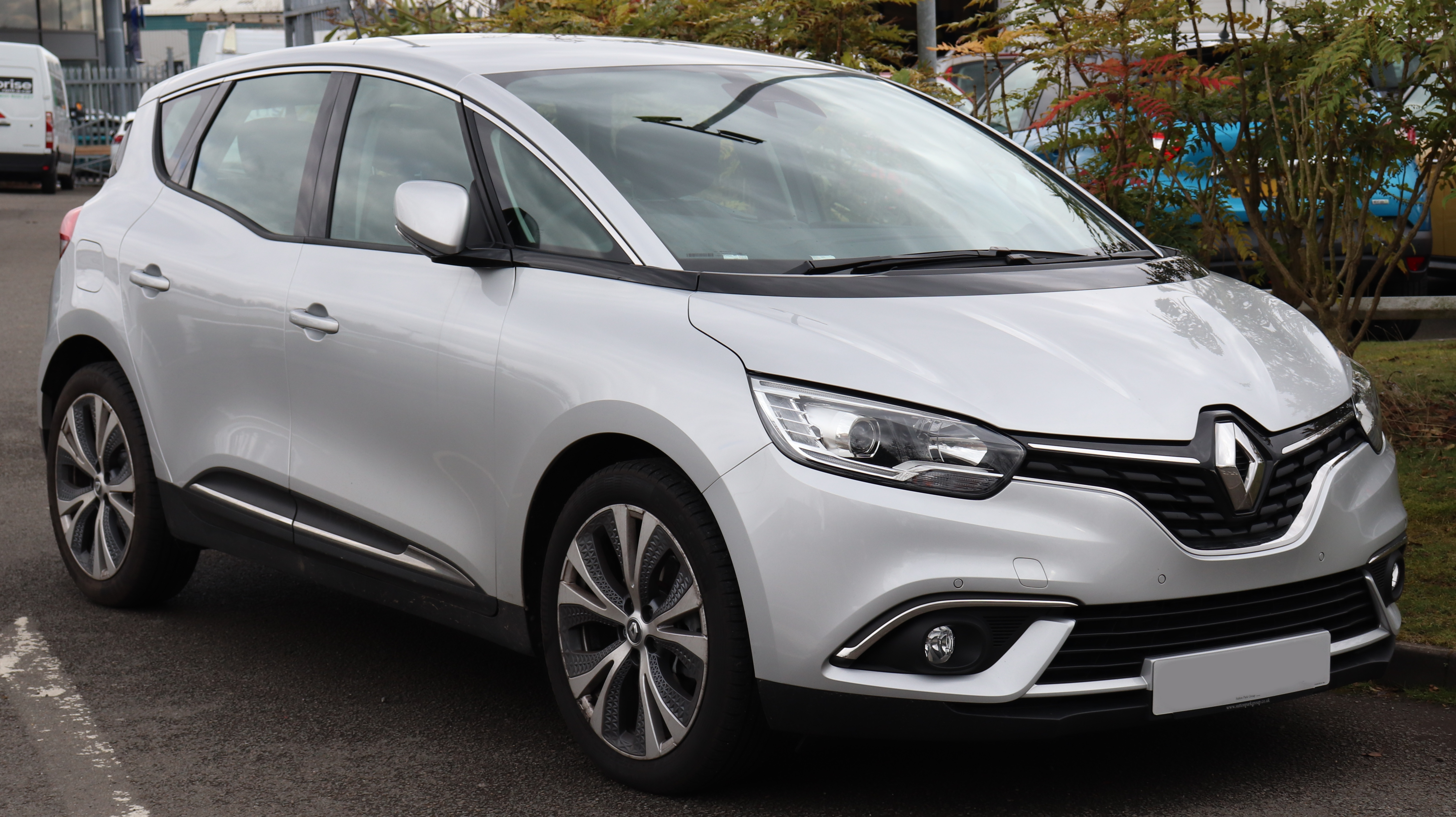
Renault Scénic

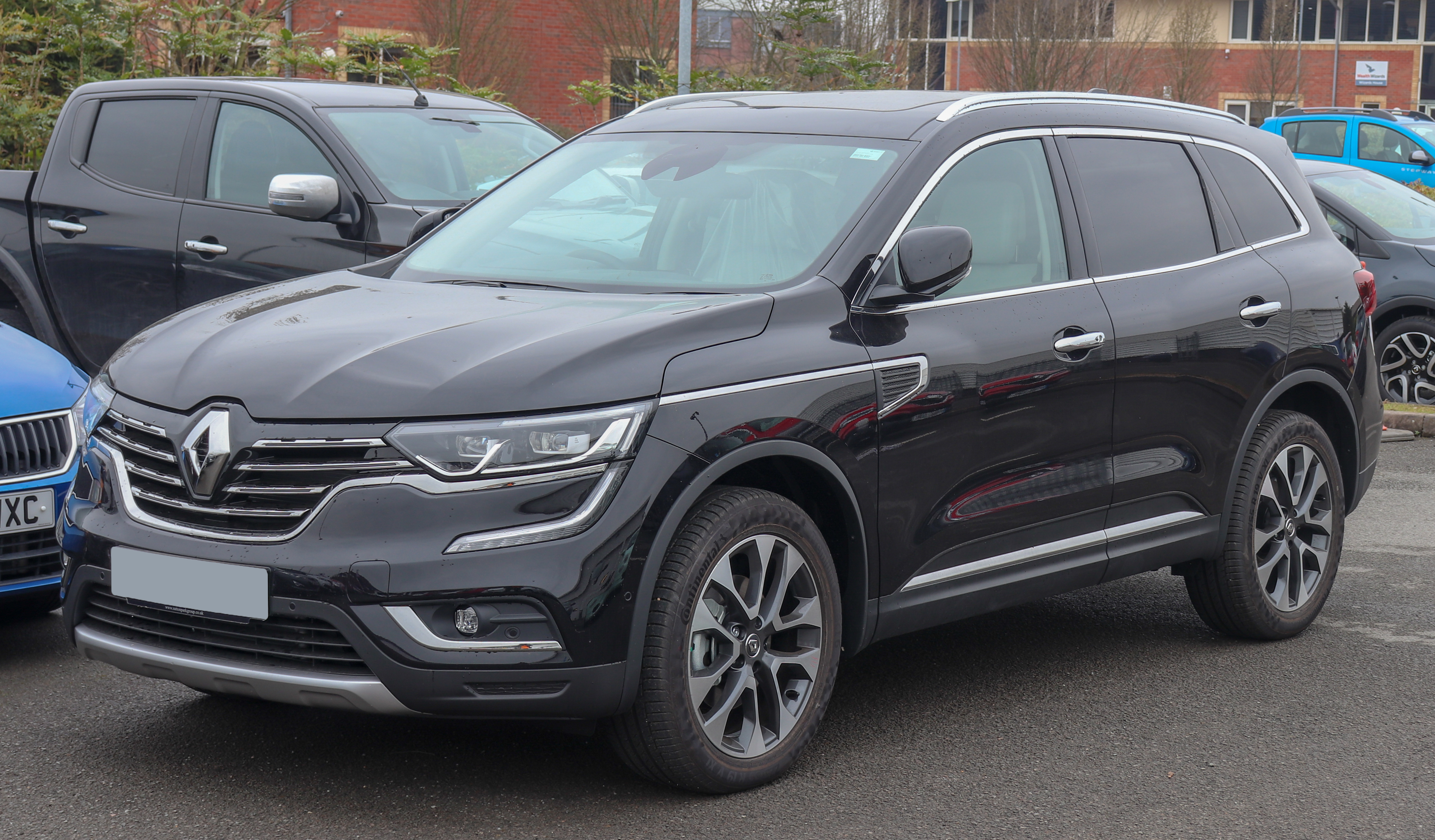
Renault Koleos

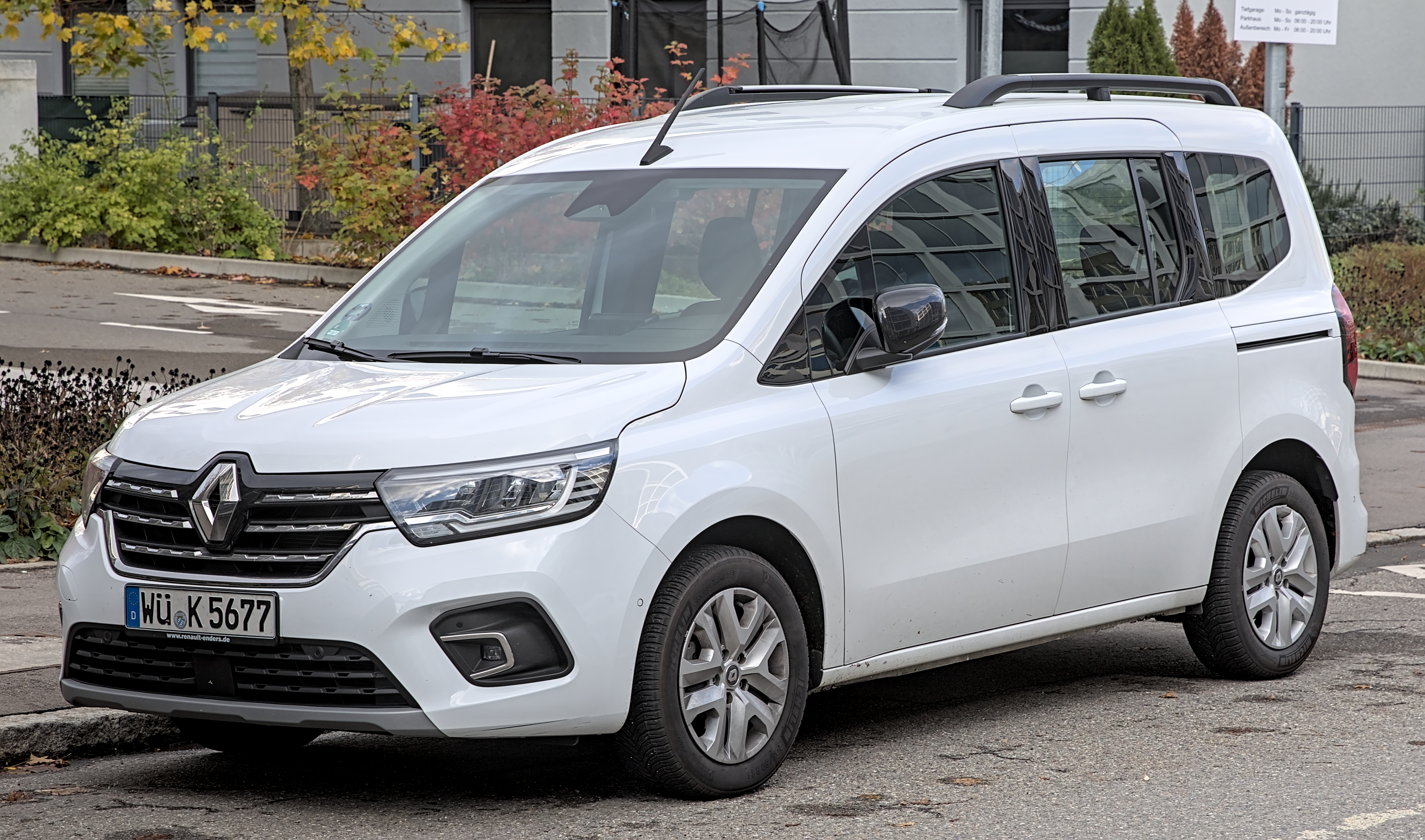
Renault Kangoo

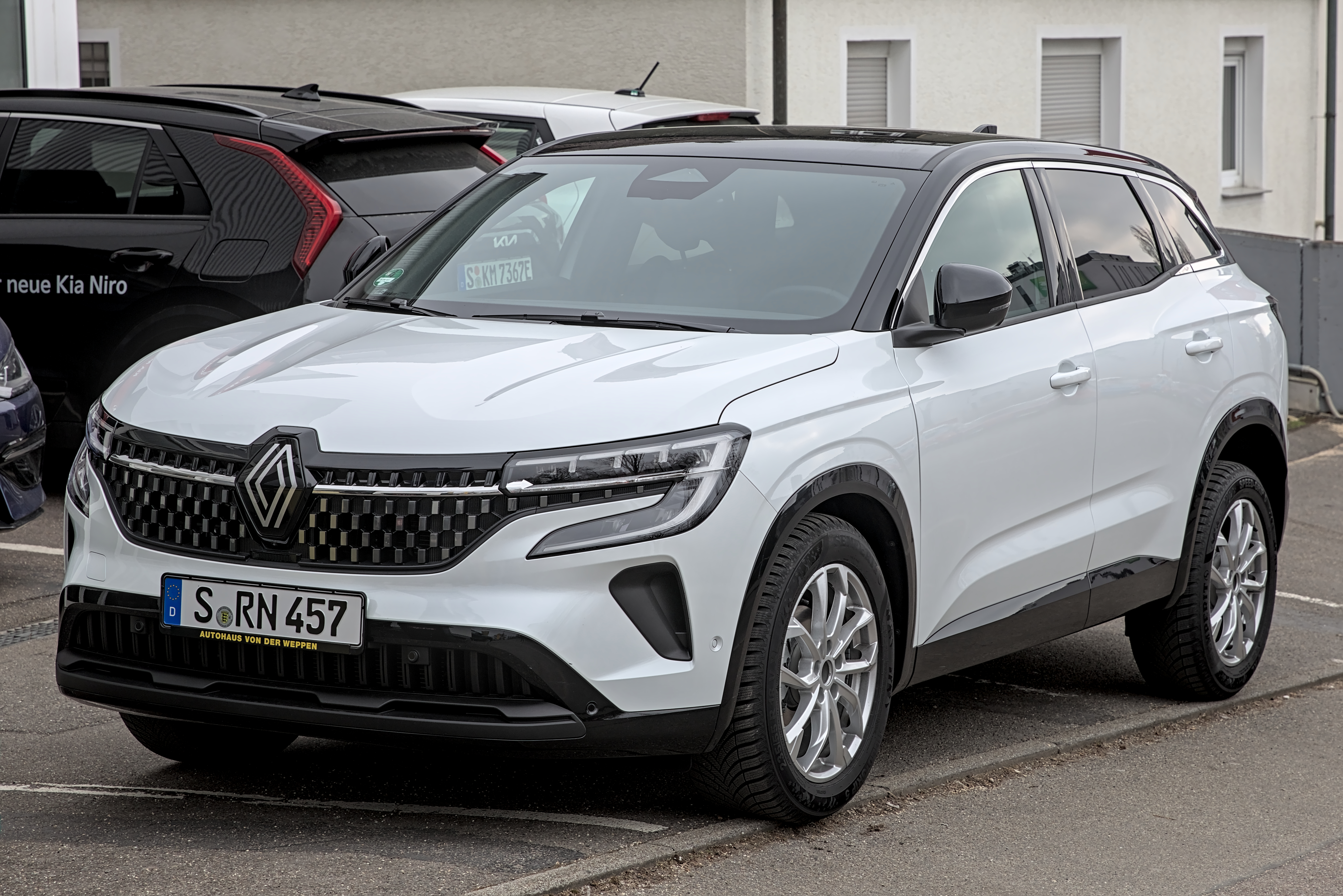
Renault Austral

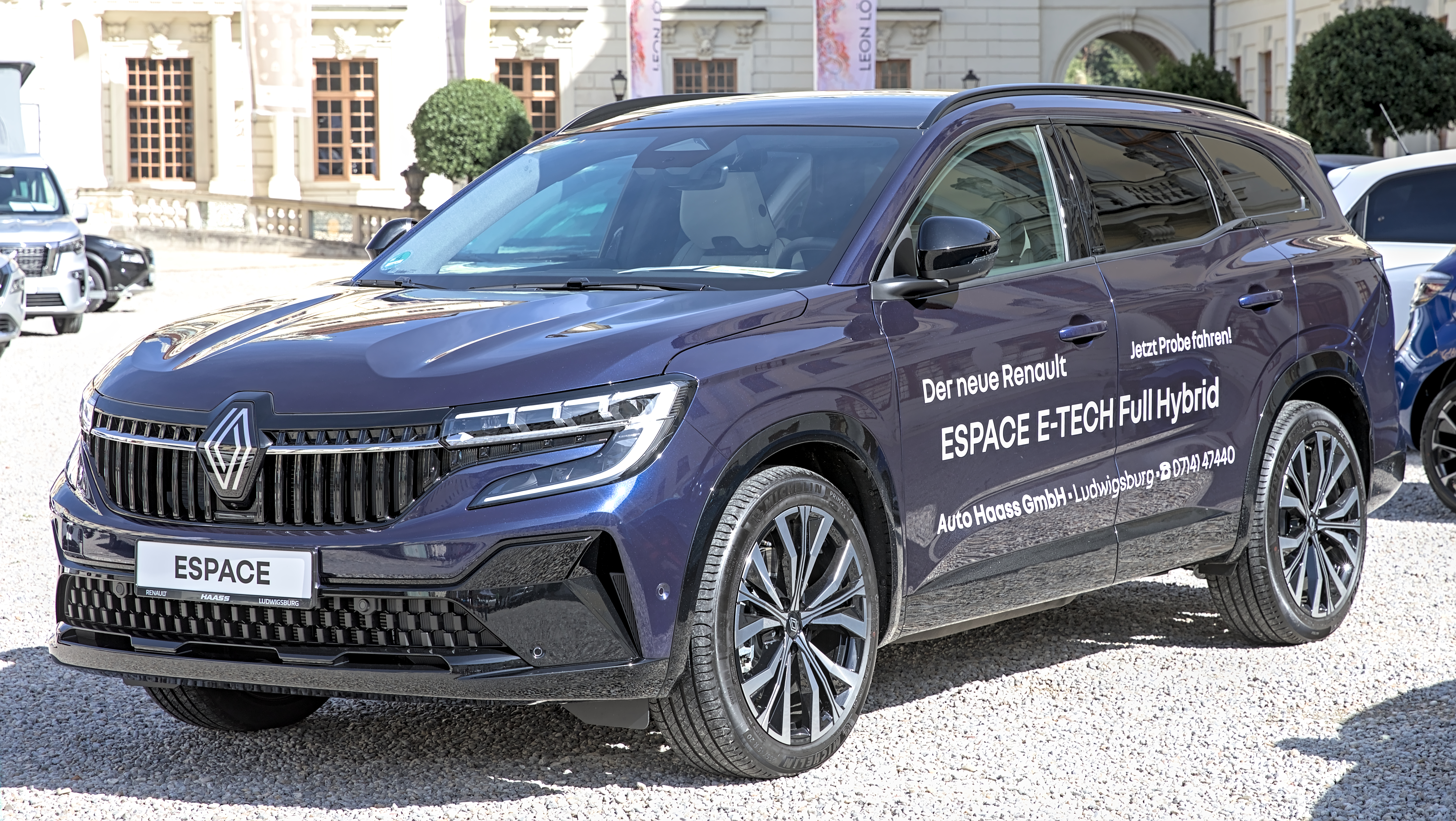
Renault Espace VI

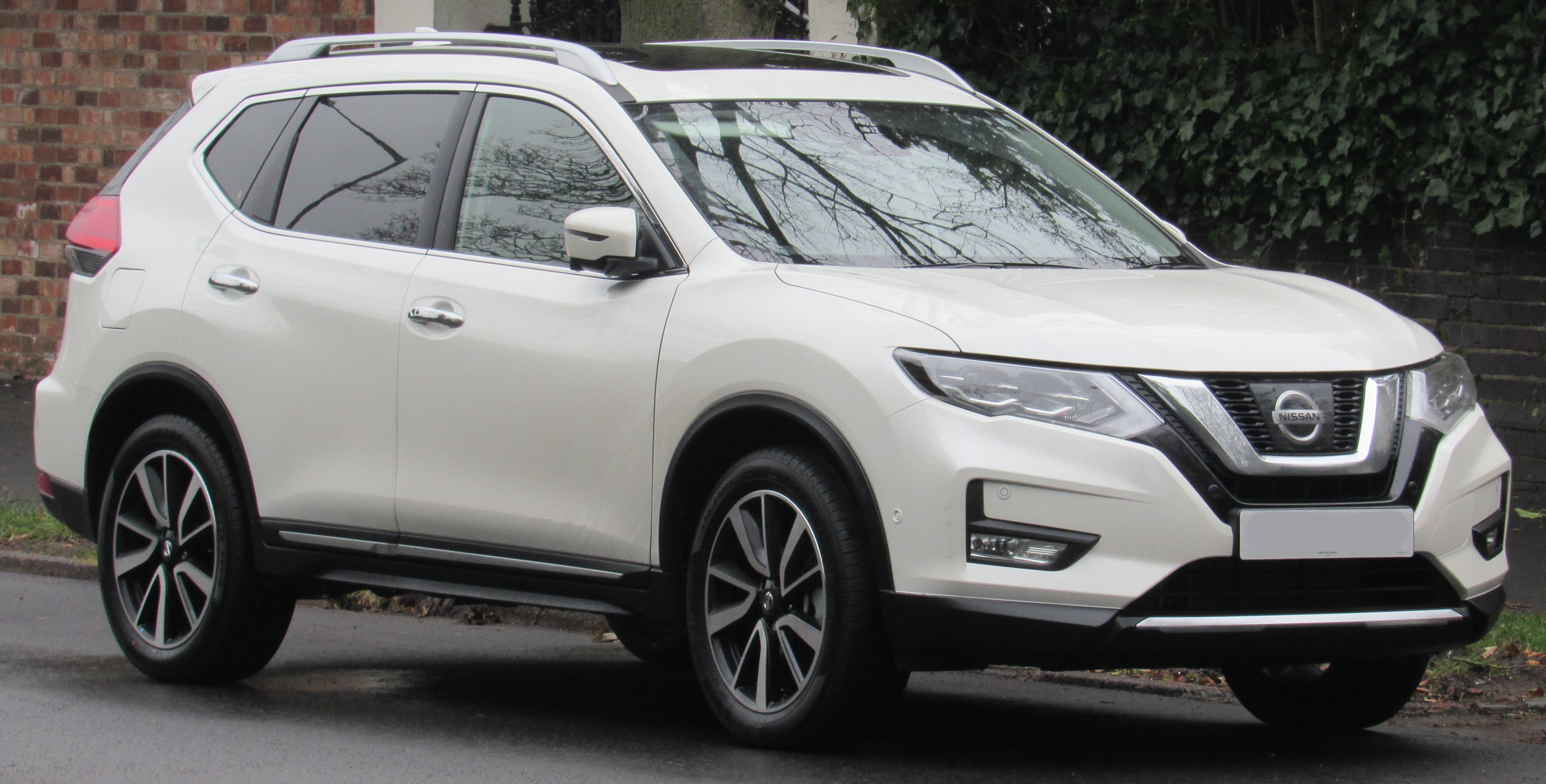
Nissan X-Trail

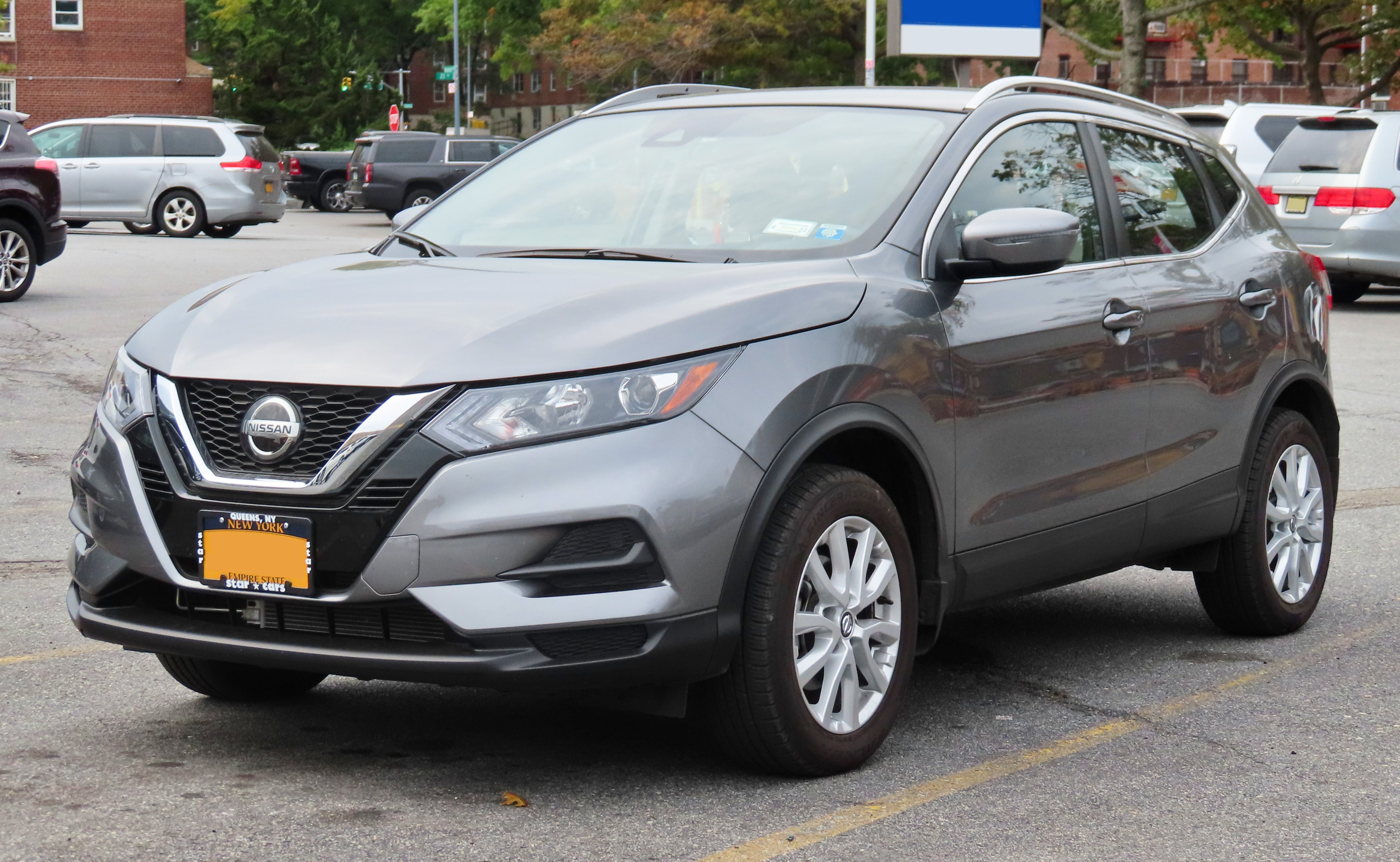
Nissan Rogue Sport

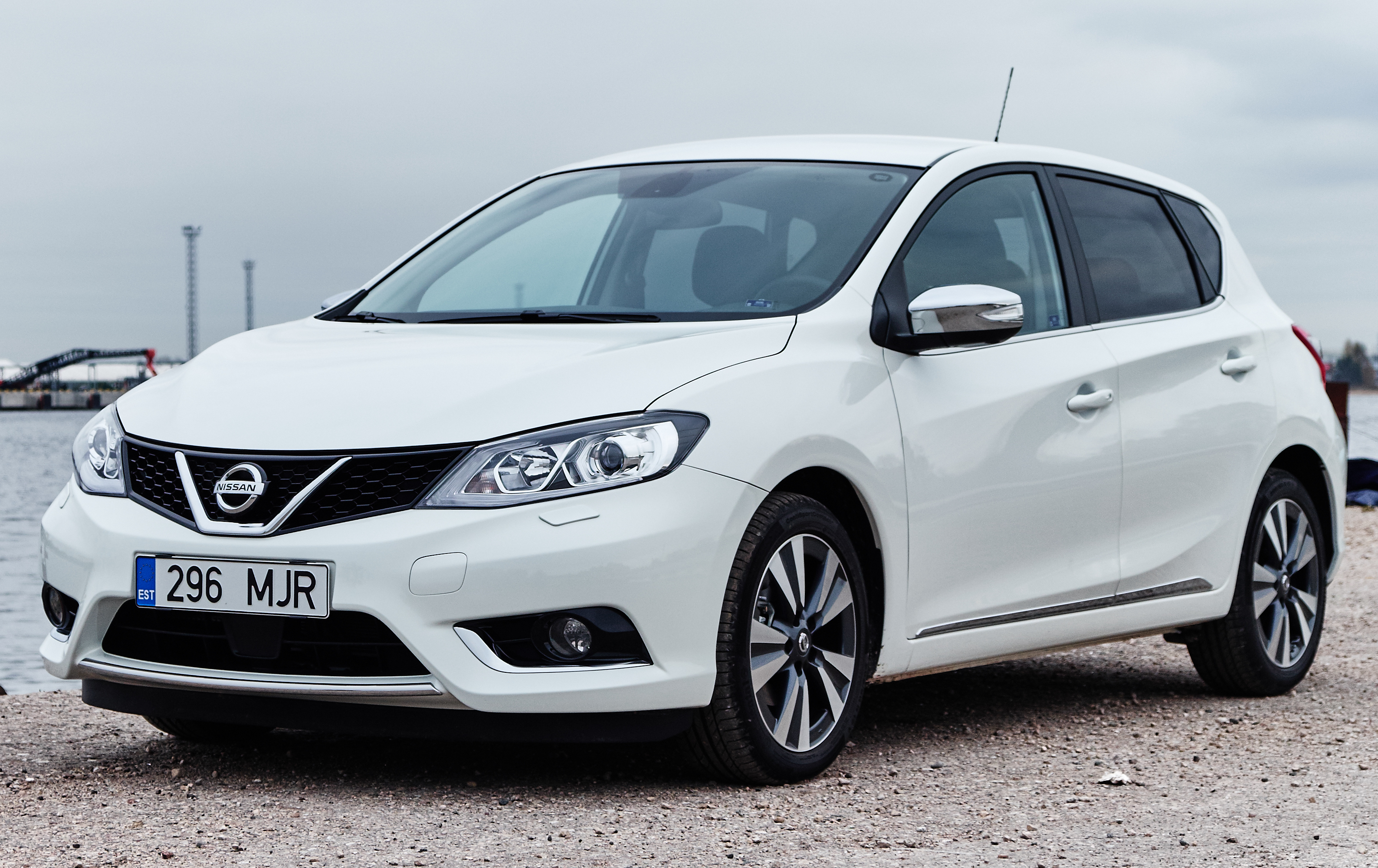
Nissan Pulsar

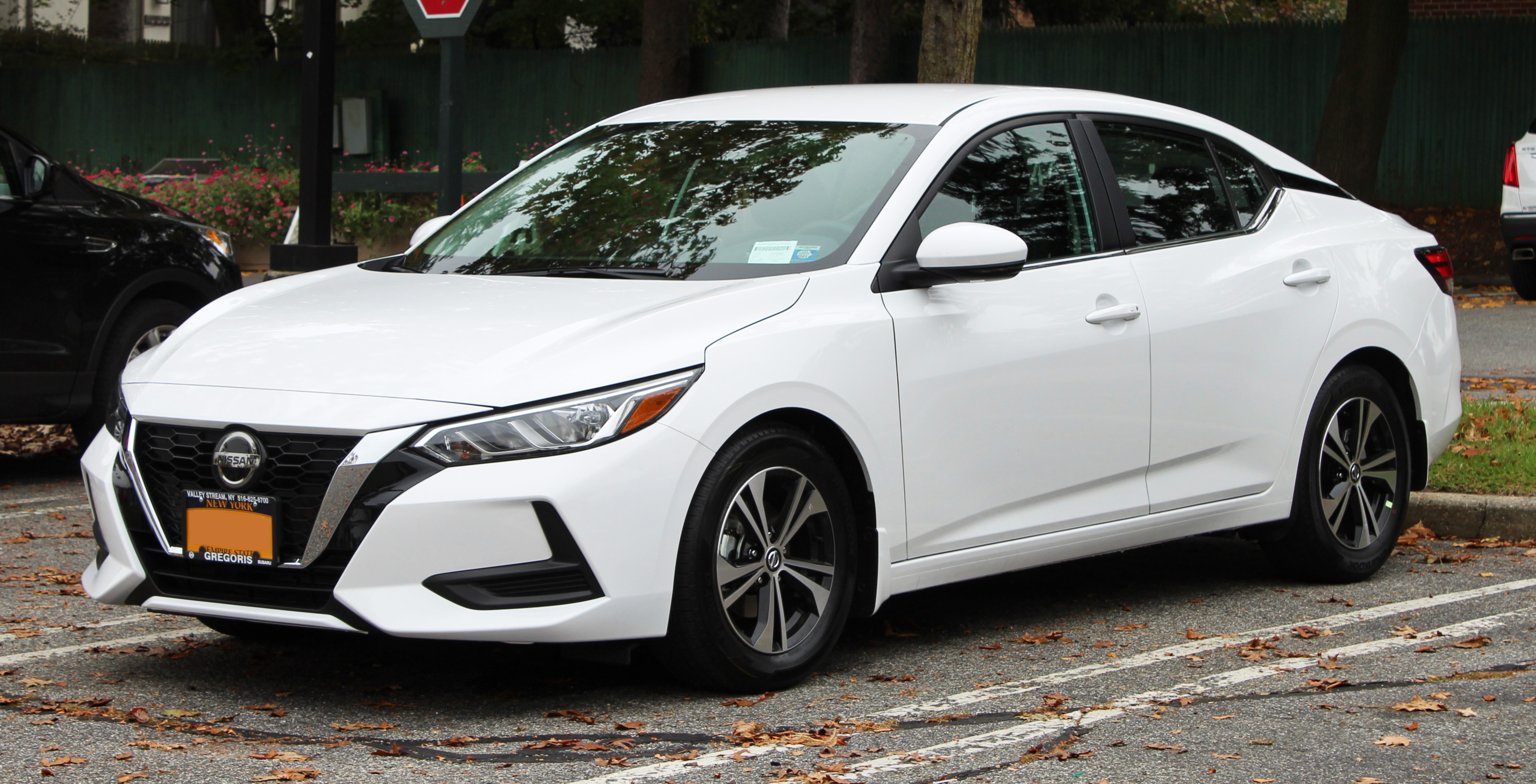
Nissan Sentra VII

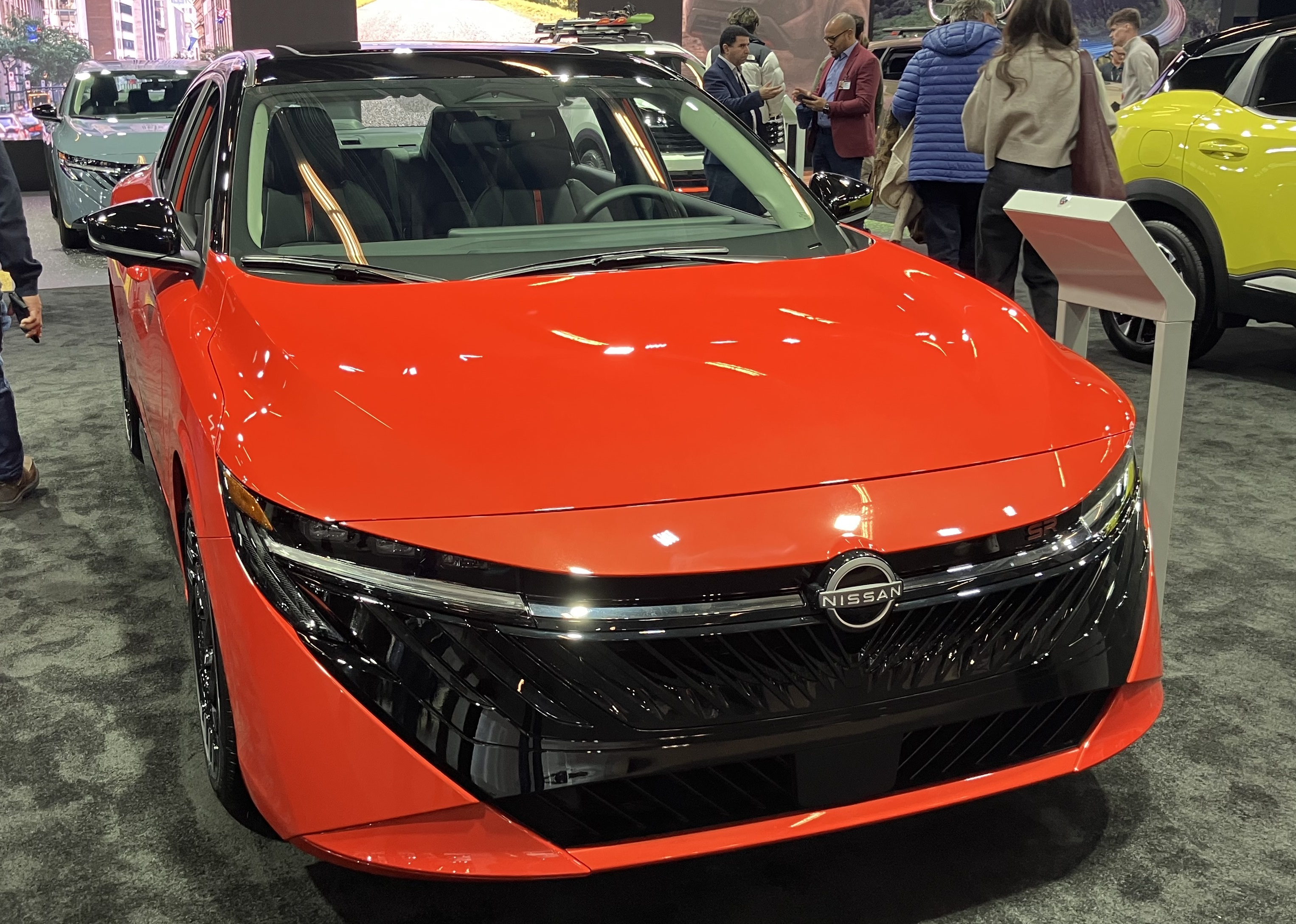
Nissan Sentra VIII

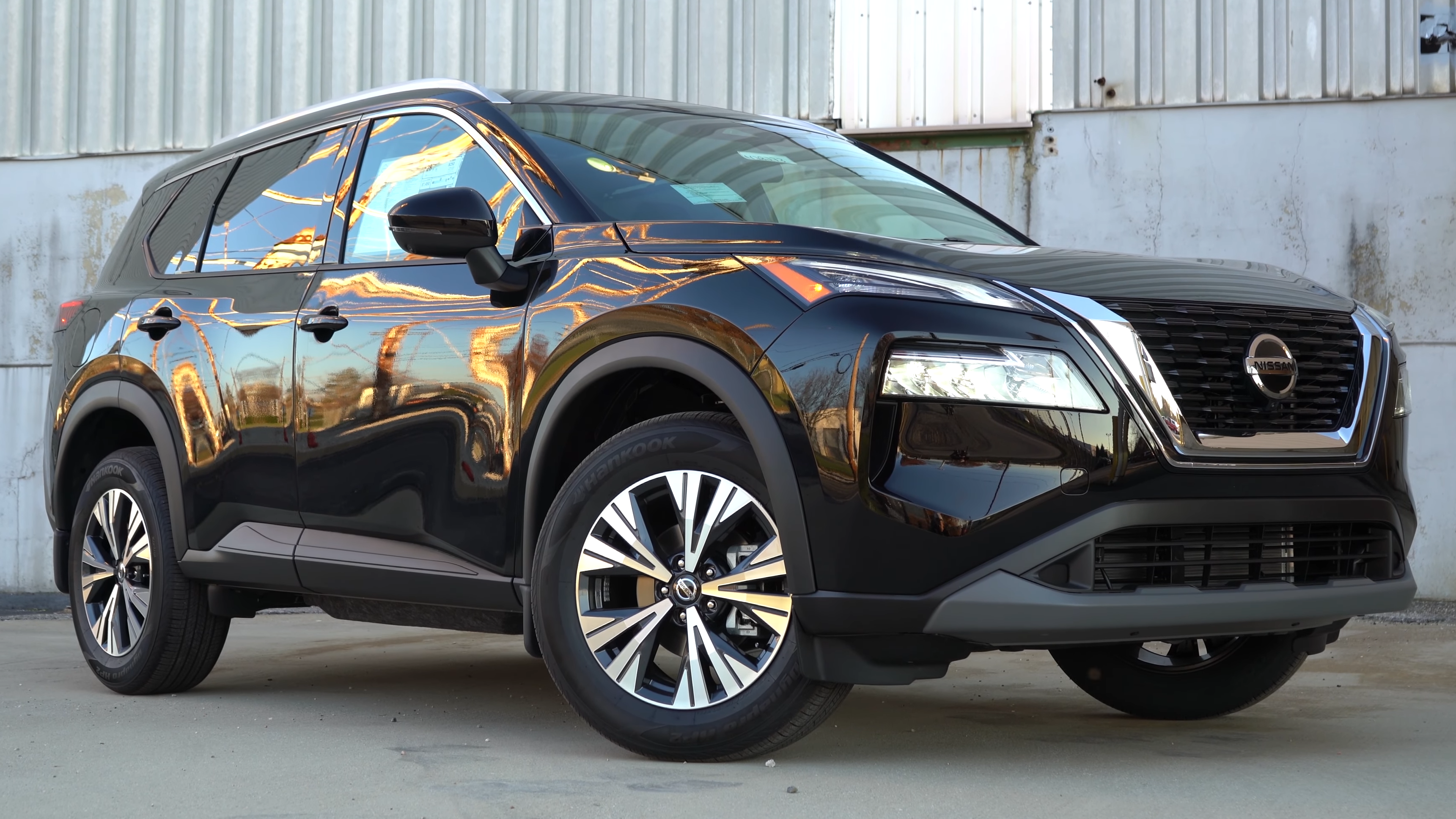
Nissan Rogue

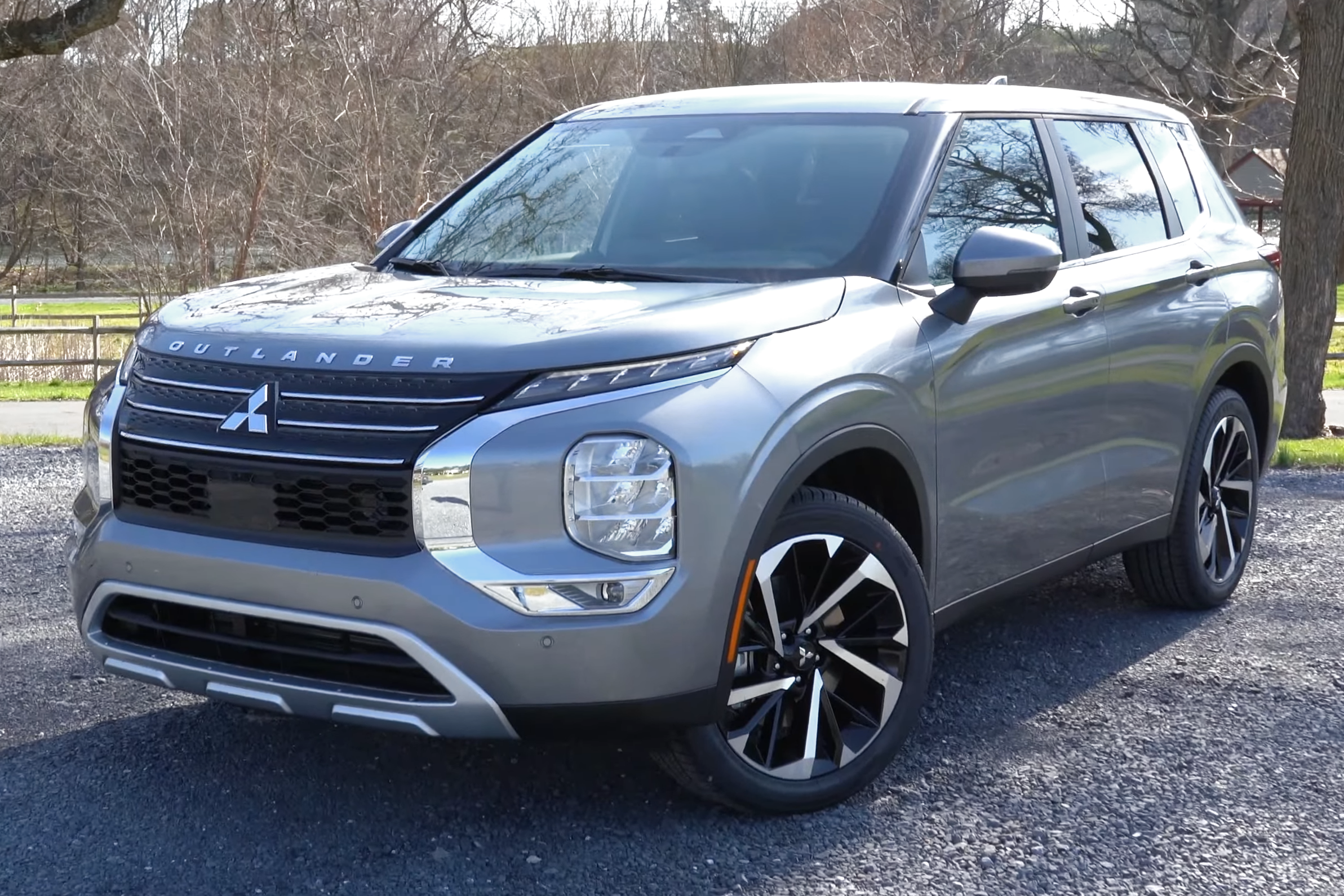
Mitsubishi Outlander

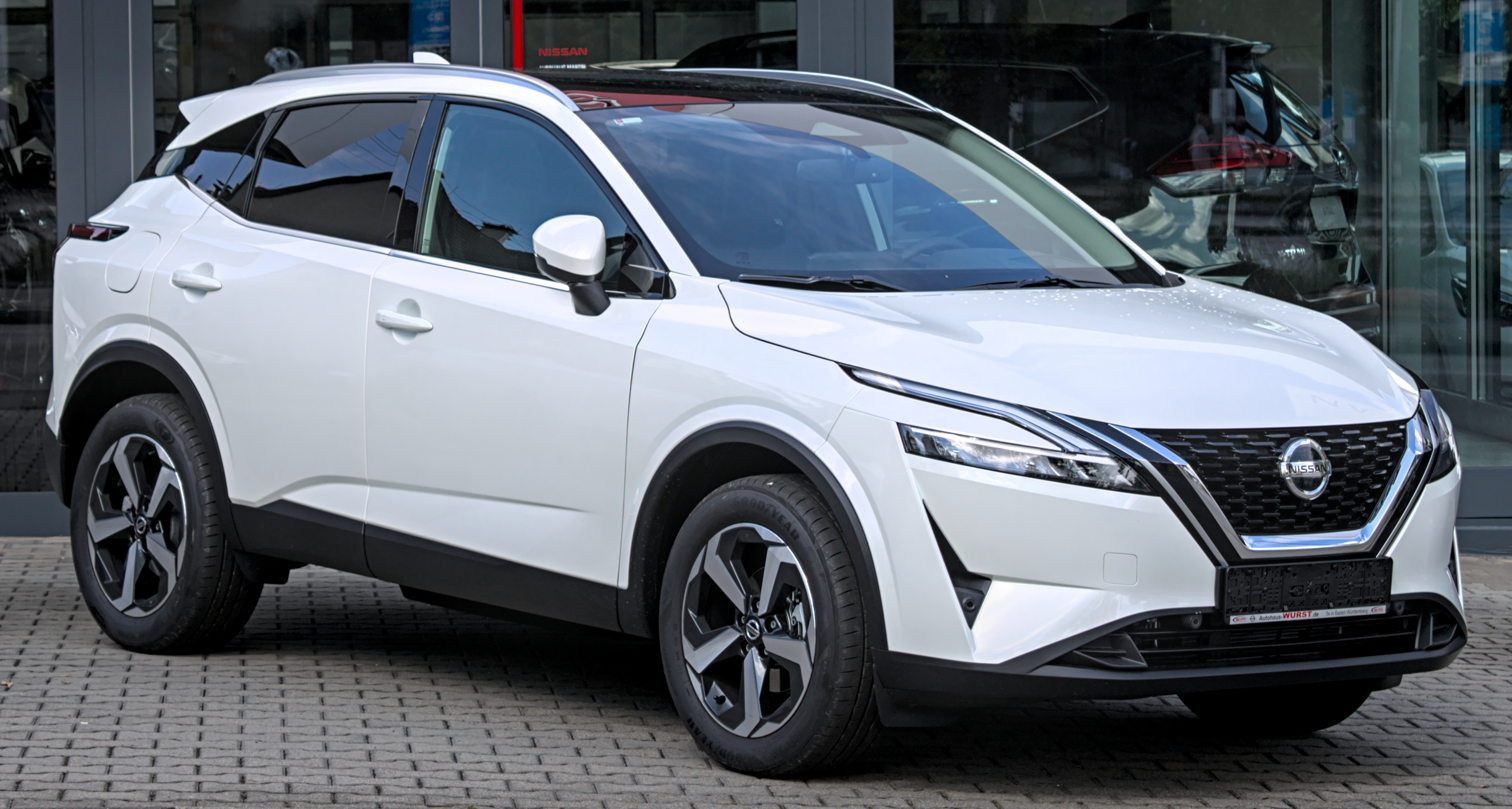
Nissan Qashqai

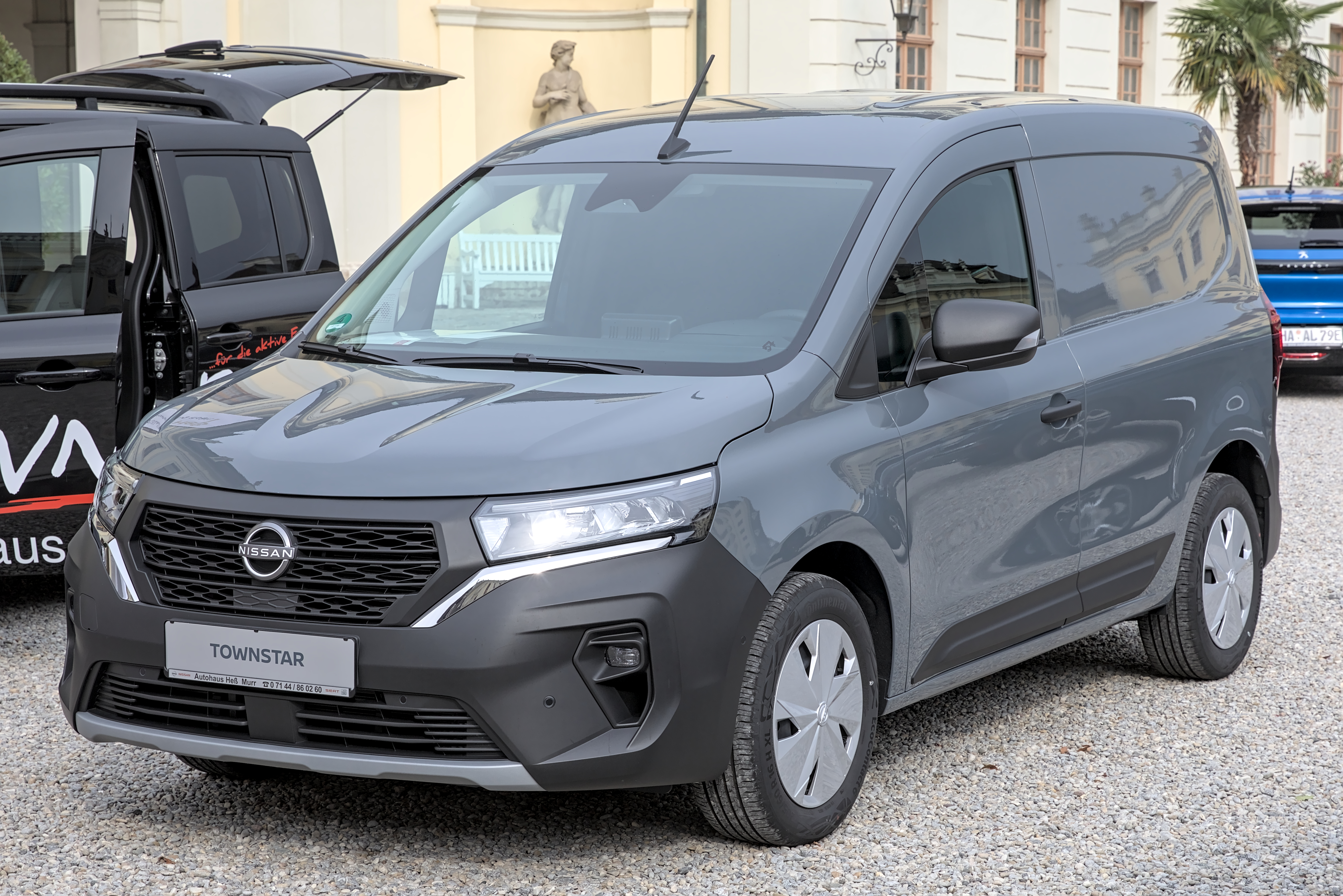
Nissan Townstar

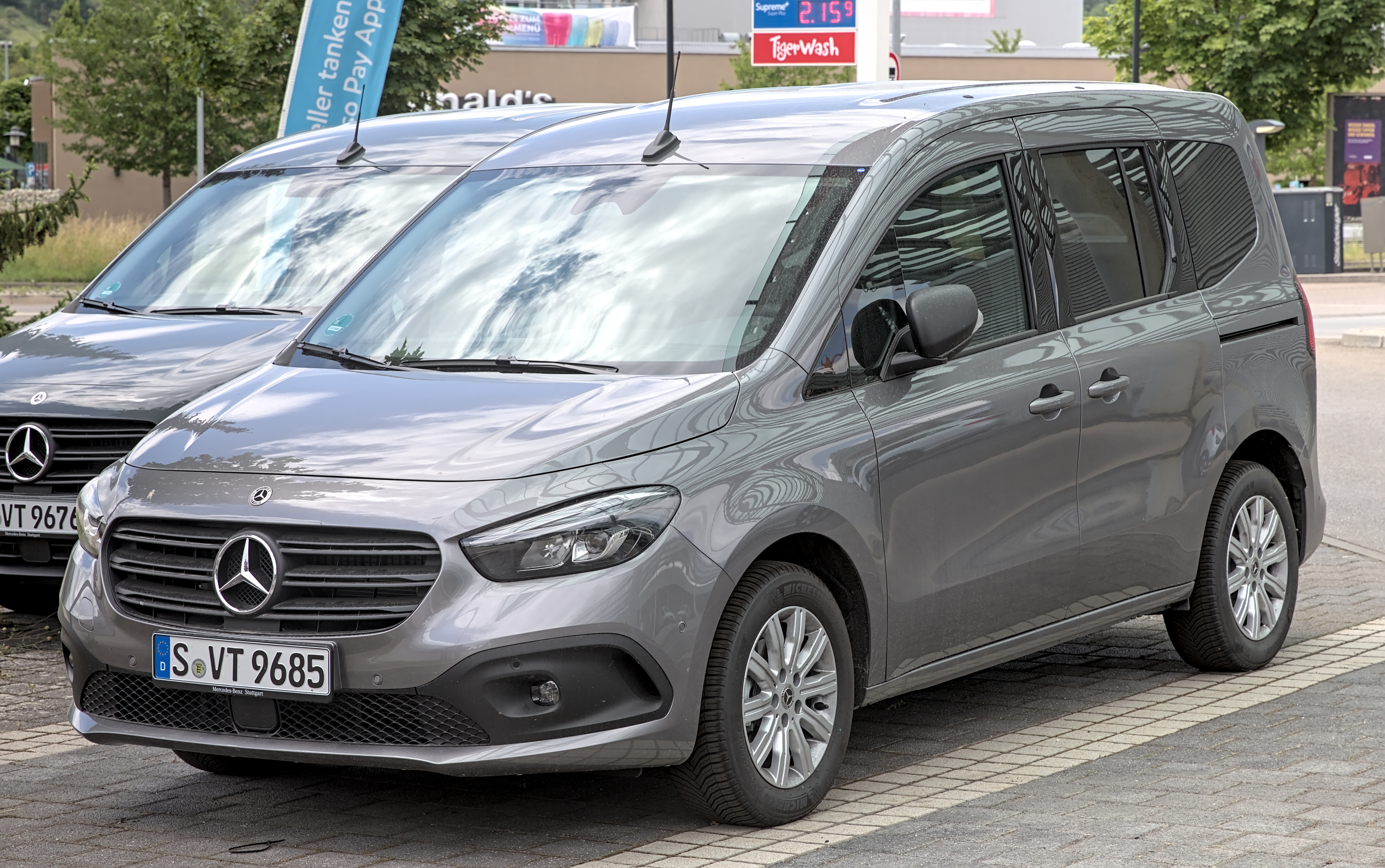
Mercedes Citan

=== CMF-EV / AmpR Medium / RGEV Medium ===
The AmpR Medium platform (previously CMF-EV until November 2023) underpins battery electric vehicles. It replaces the EV platform used by the Nissan Leaf. In November 2023, Renault subsidiary Ampere renamed this platform to AmpR Medium. It was renamed again to RGEV Medium, after Ampere was absorbed back into Renault.

Vehicles using platform (calendar years):

- Renault Megane E-Tech Electric (2021–present)
- Renault Scenic E-Tech (2023–present)
  - Mitsubishi Eclipse Cross (2025–present)
- Nissan Ariya (2022–present)
- Nissan Leaf (2025–present)
  - Mitsubishi Eclipse Sportback (2026, to commence)
- Nissan Juke EV (2026, to commence)
- Alpine A390 (2026–present)
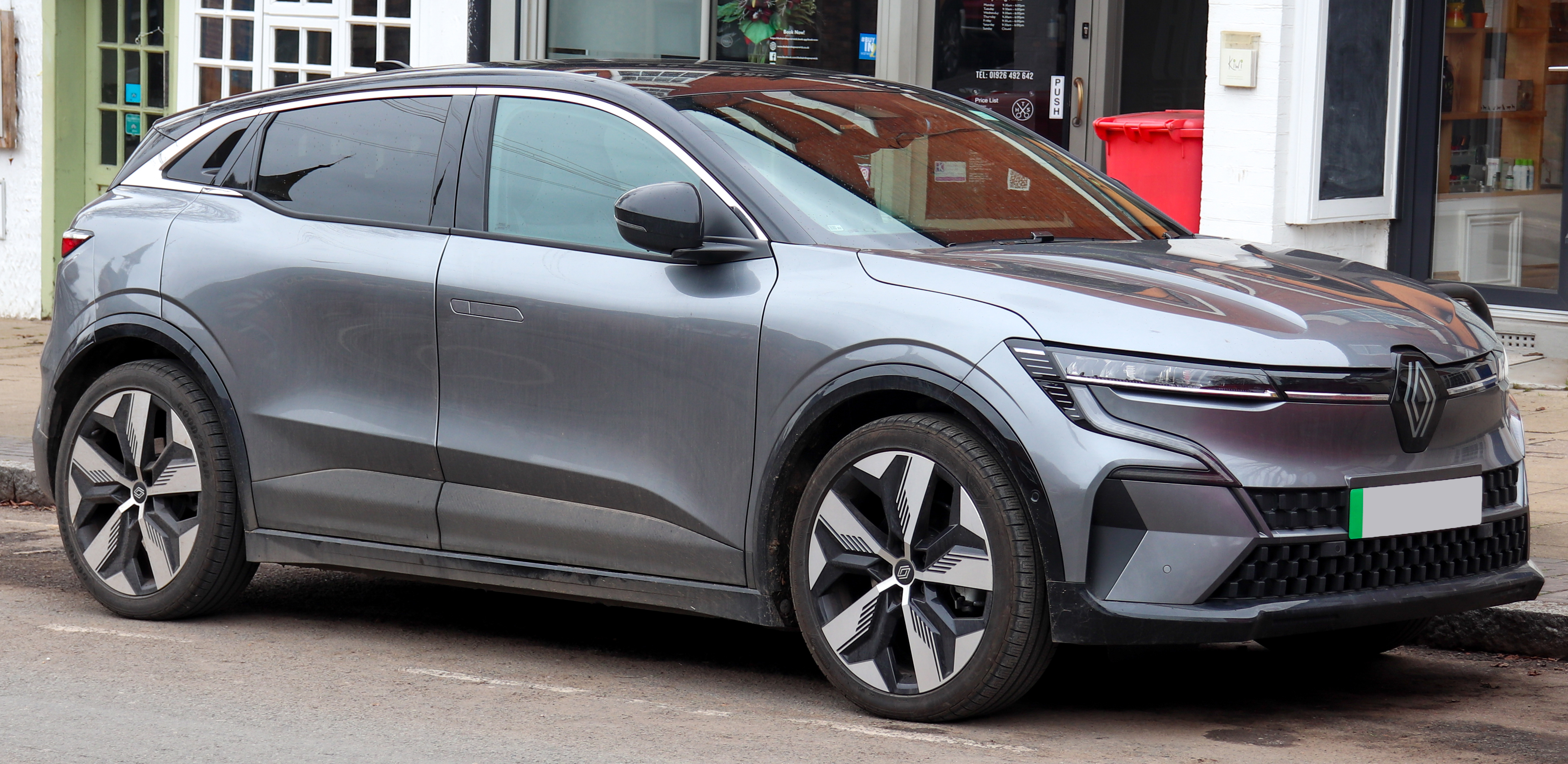
Renault Mégane E-Tech Electric

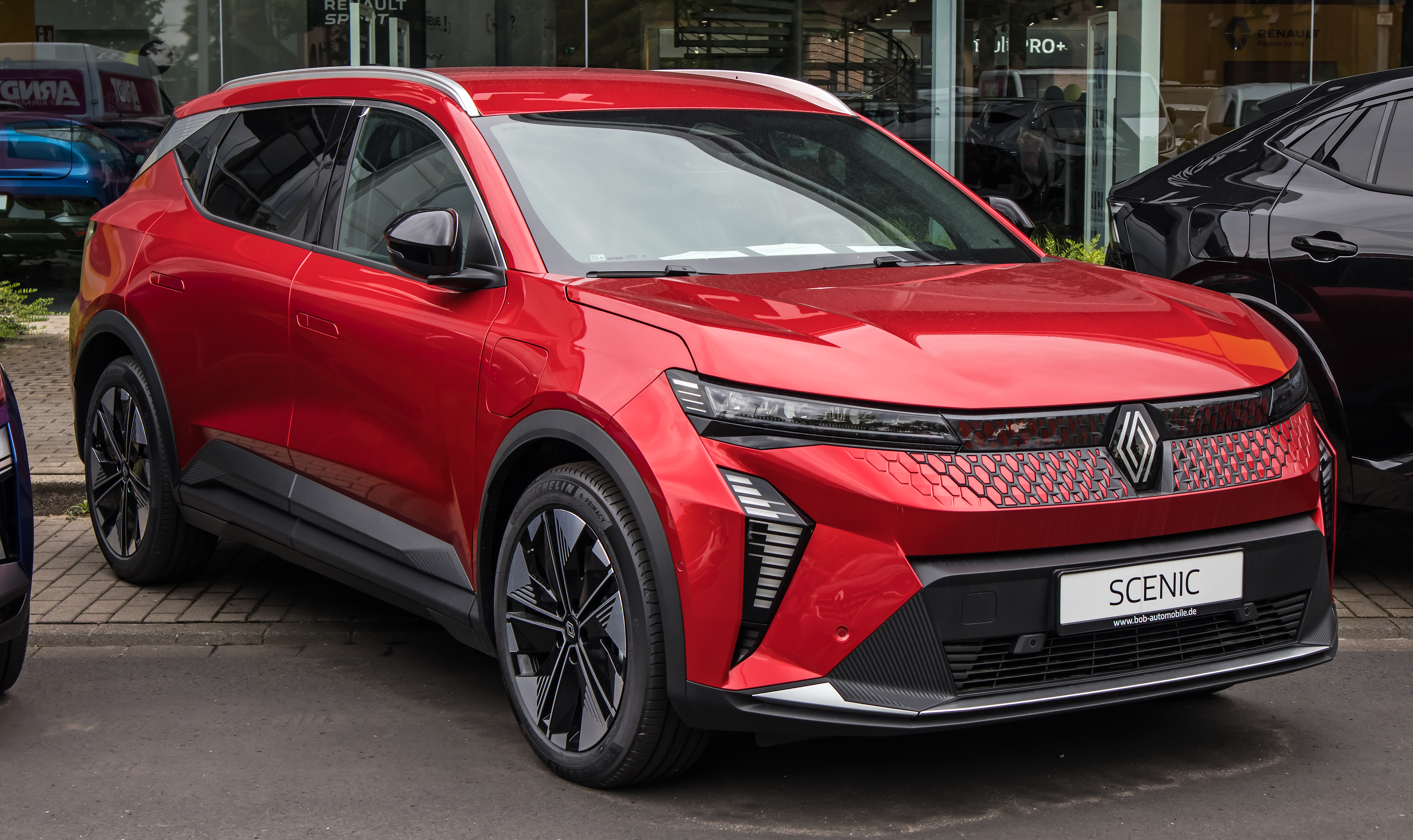
Renault Scenic E-Tech

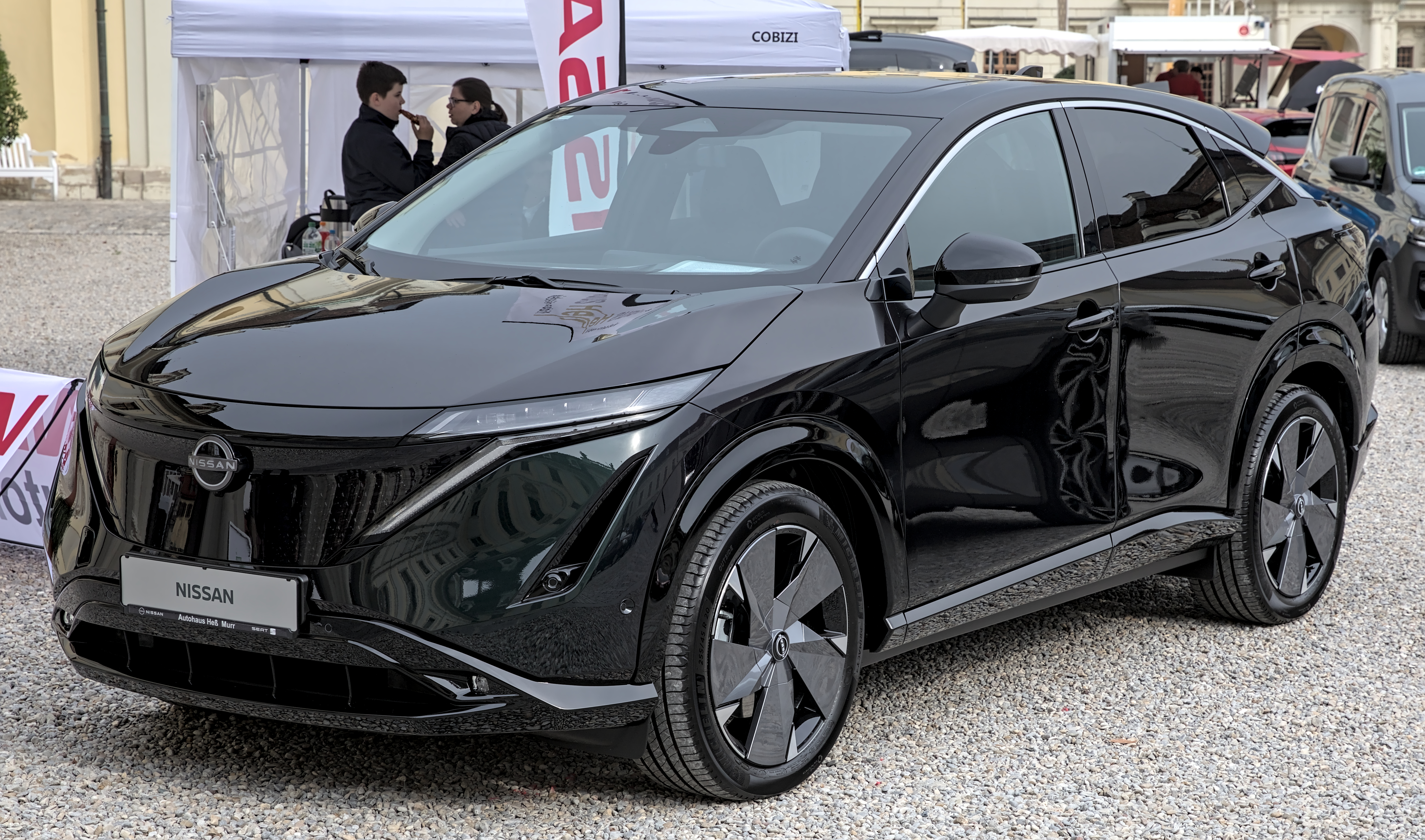
Nissan Ariya

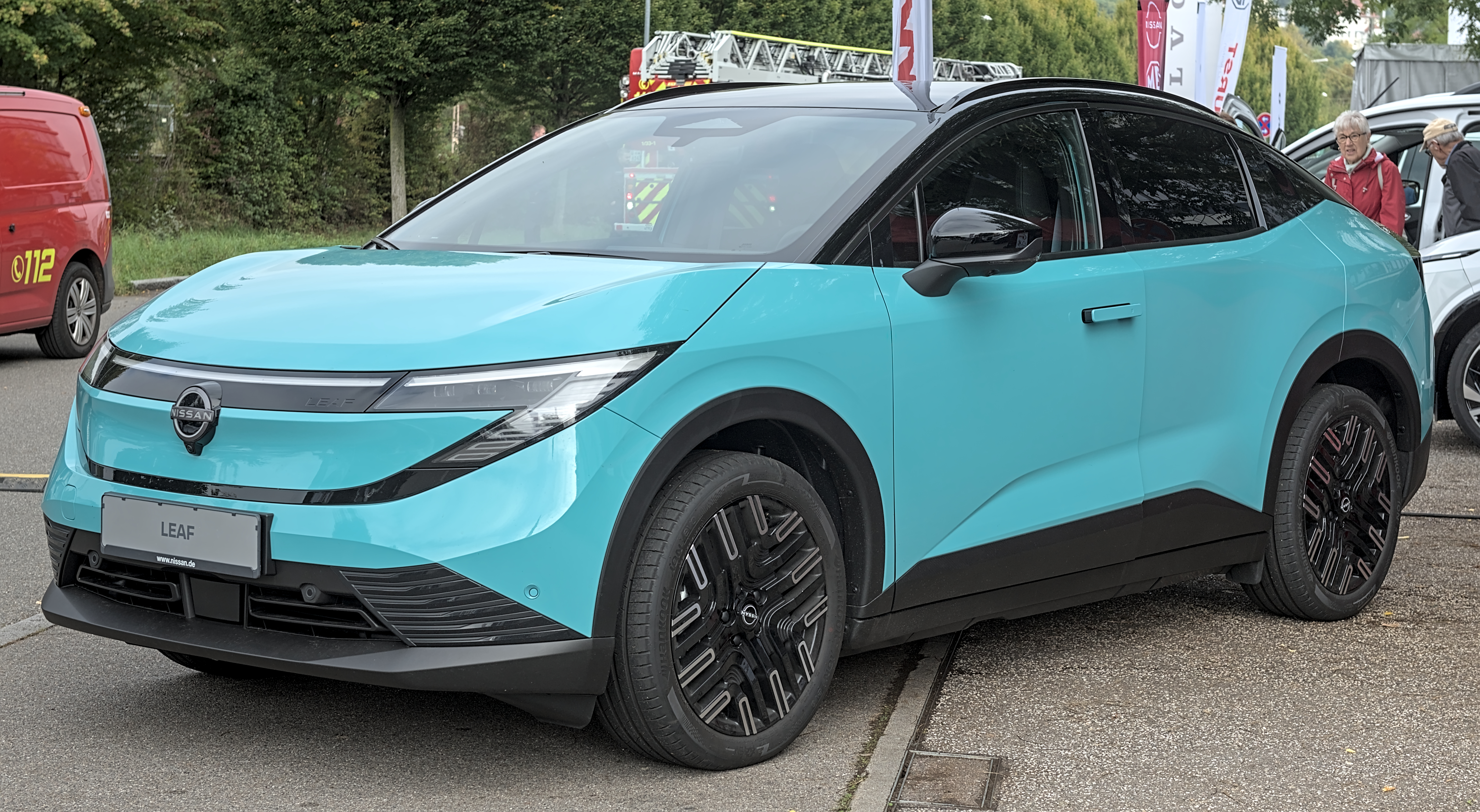
Nissan Leaf

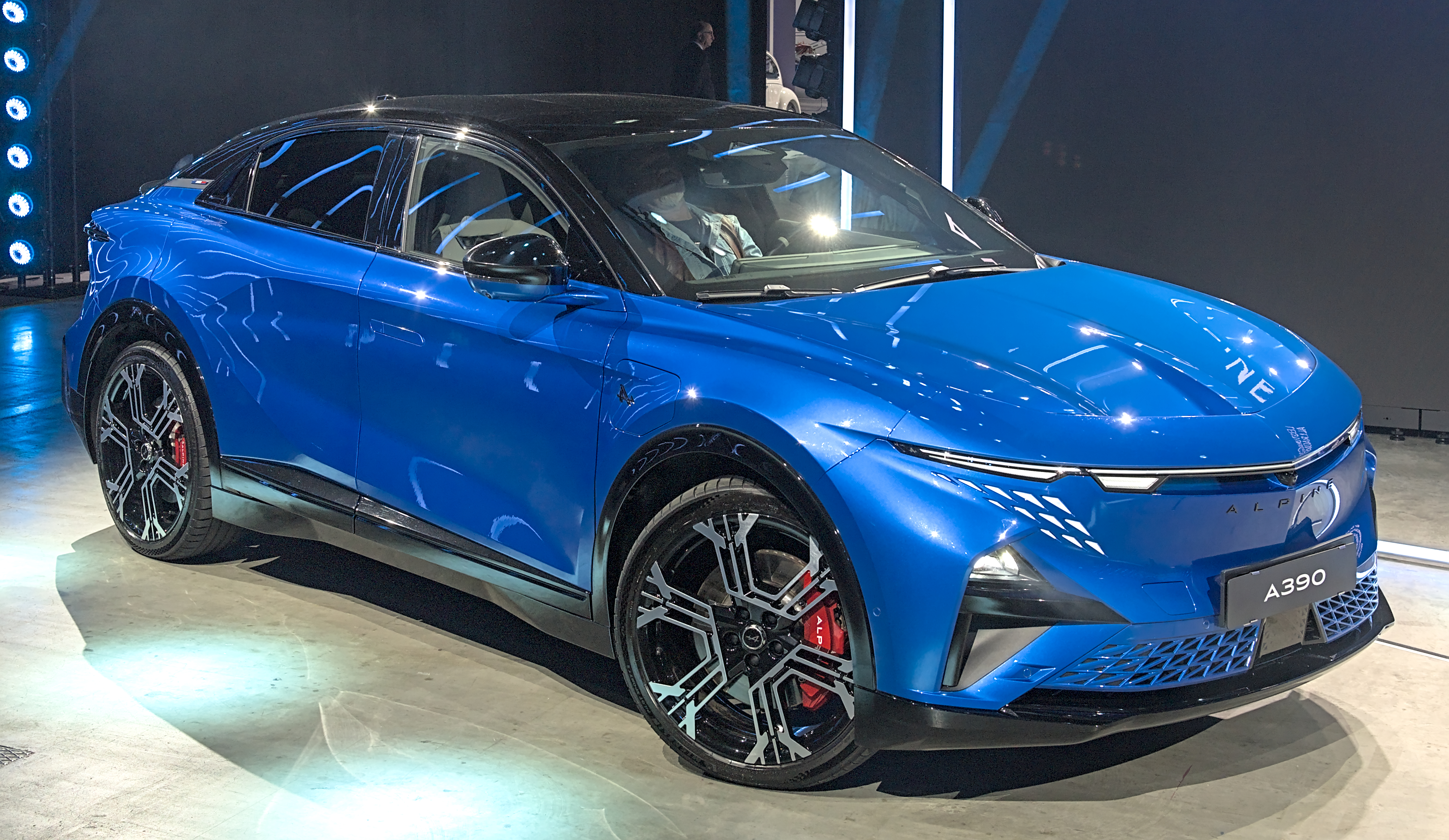
Alpine A390

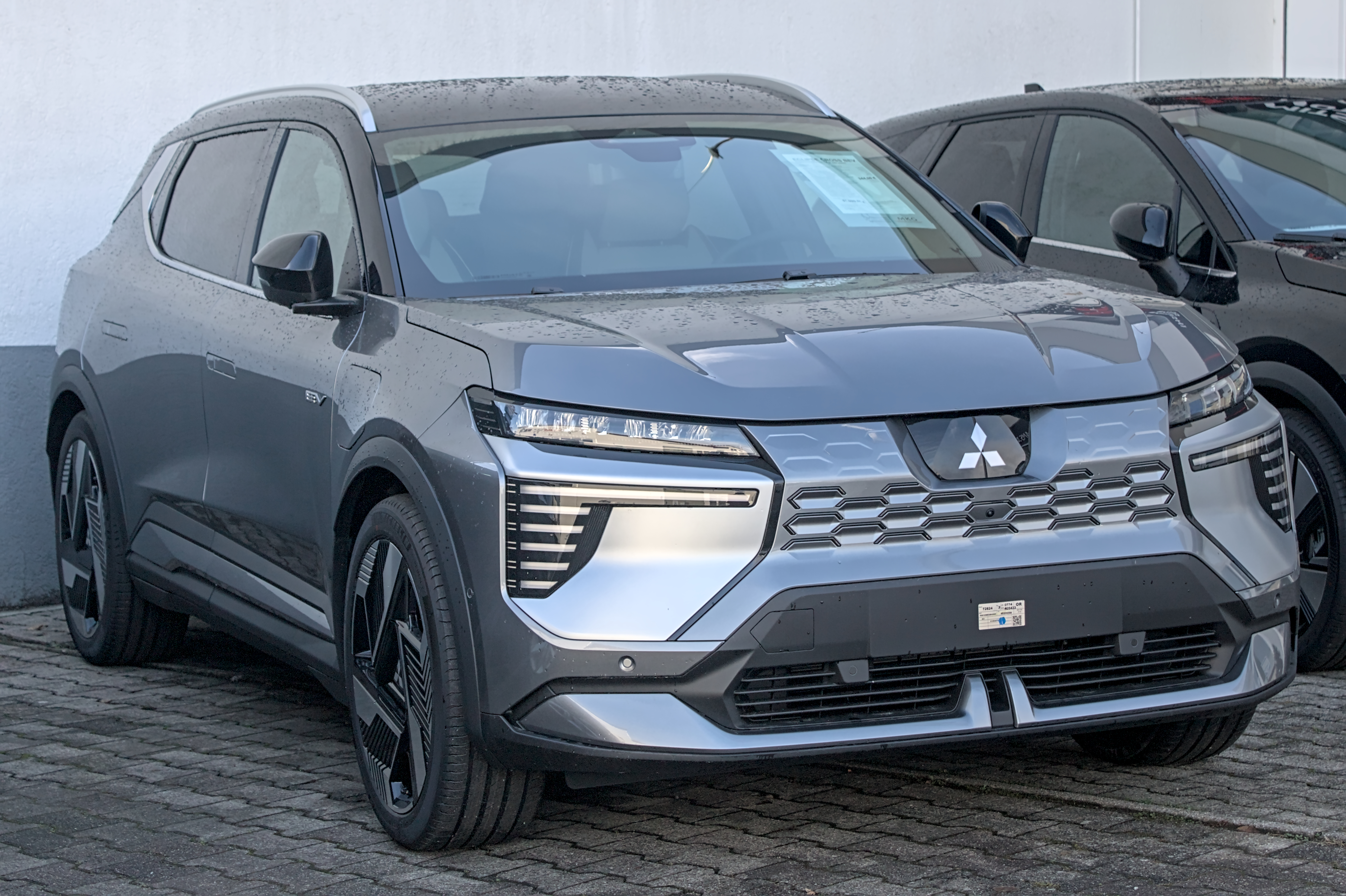
Mitsubishi Eclipse Cross
