= Ampère =

The ampere or amp (symbol A) is the base unit of electric current in the International System of Units.

Ampere or Ampère may also refer to:

== People ==
- André-Marie Ampère (1775–1836), physicist, mathematician and namesake of the ampere unit
- Jean-Jacques Ampère (1800–1864), French philologist

== Places ==
- Ampére, a town in Paraná state, Brasil
- Aïn Azel, a commune in Algeria, former name Ampère
- Collège-lycée Ampère, a school in Lyon, France
- Place Ampère, a square in Lyon, France
- Ampère Seamount, a Seamount in the Atlantic Ocean 600km from Gibraltar

== Transportation ==
- Ampere (company), electric vehicle subsidiary of Renault
- Ampère (car), a French automobile, built 1906–1909
- Ampere station, a former rail station in East Orange, New Jersey, US
- USS Ampere, a patrol craft of the US Navy
- MV Ampere, the world's first battery electric ferry

== Other uses ==
- Ampere (microarchitecture), a microarchitecture used in Nvidia GPUs
- Ampère Prize, a French scientific prize awarded annually in honor of André-Marie Ampère
- Ampere (band), an American punk band known for short and extremely loud performances
- Ampere Computing, an American semiconductor company
- Ampere WS-1, a short-lived Japanese laptop based on the Motorola 68000

== See also ==
- Ampere balance, an electromechanical apparatus for precise measurement of the ampere
- Ampère's circuital law, a rule relating the current in a conductor to the magnetic field around it
- Ampère's force law, the force of attraction or repulsion between two current-carrying wires
- Monge–Ampère equation, a type of nonlinear second order partial differential equation
- AMPERS, the Association of Minnesota Public Educational Radio Stations
- Ampera (disambiguation)
- Amped (disambiguation)
- AMPS (disambiguation)
- Amp (disambiguation)
