= Ampere (company) =

French electric vehicle company

- Company type: Subsidiary (autonomous business)
- Industry: Electric vehicles
- Founded: November 8, 2022; 3 years ago (official announcement); 1 November 2023 (officially separated)
- Defunct: January 2026
- Fate: Merged back into Renault
- Headquarters: France
- Area served: Europe
- Number of employees: 10,000
- Parent: Renault
- Website: https://www.ampere.cars/en/

Ampere was an electric vehicle and software company formed in 2023 by Groupe Renault as part of the third phase of its "Renaulution" recovery plan. Renault originally planned to spin off Ampere and proceed with an IPO but canceled these plans in January 2024 but is operated as an autonomous business. Ampere was set to develop and supply vehicles, initially for Renault.

Announced on 8 November 2022, Ampere is part of Luca de Meo's "reinvention" plans, which see the company shift its focus to become what he calls "a next-generation car company".

By developing Ampere as its own entity, Groupe Renault says it is creating "the first pure EV and software player born from an OEM disruption".

== Platforms ==
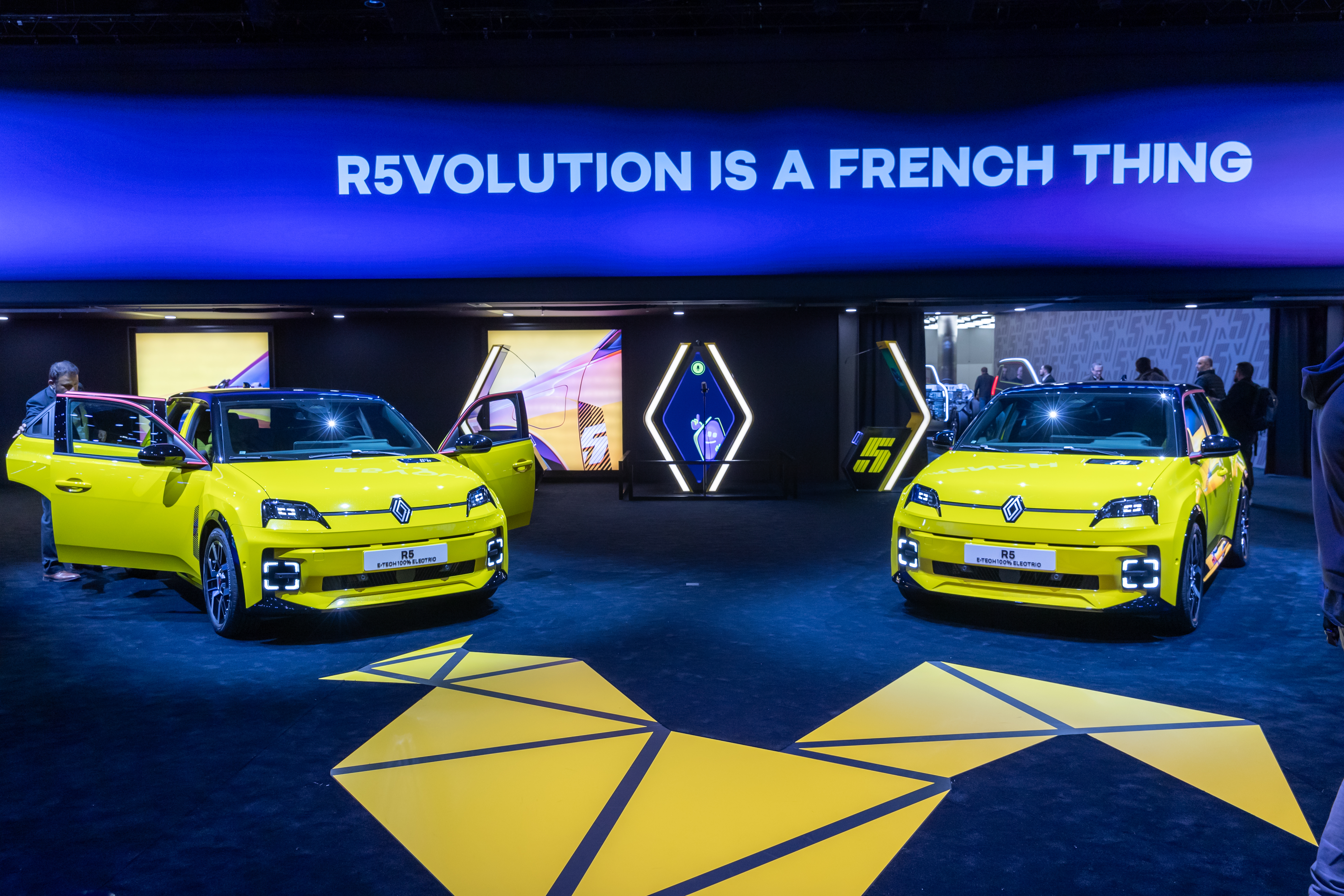
Launch event of the Renault 5 E-Tech at the 2024 Geneva International Motor Show

=== AmpR Small ===
Formerly known as the CMF-B EV platform.

==== Applications ====
- Alpine A290
- Renault 5 E-Tech
- Renault 4 E-Tech
- Nissan Micra EV
- Renault Twingo E-Tech

=== AmpR Medium ===
Formerly known as the CMF-EV platform.

==== Applications ====
- Alpine A390
- Nissan Ariya
- Renault Megane E-Tech
- Renault Scenic E-Tech

== History ==
Renault planned to list the company on the Paris stock exchange from the second half of 2023, retaining a majority stake. However, on 29 January 2024 cancelled plans for the IPO citing "current equity market conditions".

Mitsubishi announced in October 2023 that it would invest up to 200 million euros ($213 million) in Ampere.

== Proposed models ==
=== In production ===
- Alpine A290 (2024–present)
- Alpine A390 (2025–present)
- Nissan Micra EV (2025–present), electric successor to the fifth generation Nissan Micra
- Renault Mégane E-Tech (2022–present)
- Renault Scenic E-Tech (2024–present), previewed by the Renault Scenic Vision
- Renault 5 E-Tech (2024–present)
- Renault 4 E-Tech (2025–present), previewed by the 4Ever Trophy concept

=== Future ===
- Mitsubishi EV hatchback (2025)
- Renault Twingo E-Tech (2026)
