= Ampera =

Ampera may refer to:

== Indonesia ==
Ampera is generally an abbreviation for Amanat Penderitaan Rakyat [Mandate of People's Suffering], a now-rarely used colloquial name for the preamble of the Constitution of Indonesia.

- Ampera Bridge, a bridge in Palembang, South Sumatera named after the abbreviation
- Ampera LRT station, a station of Palembang LRT named after the bridge
- Ampera Cabinet, an Indonesian Cabinet from July 1966 until October 1967 named after the abbreviation
- Revised Ampera Cabinet, an Indonesian Cabinet from October 1967 until June 1968 named after the previous cabinet

== Transportation ==
- Opel Ampera, a plug-in hybrid automobile produced by General Motors
- Opel Ampera-e, a battery electric automobile produced by General Motors

== See also ==
- Amperage, an electric current
- Ampere (disambiguation)
- Ampara (disambiguation)
