= François Provost (CEO) =

- Born: 1968 (age 57–58); France
- Education: École polytechnique, École des Mines de Paris
- Title: Chief Executive Officer of Renault S.A., Chairman of Renault s.a.s.

François Provost (born 1968 in France) is a French business executive. He was appointed chief executive officer (CEO) of Renault SA and Chairman of Renault SAS effective July 31, 2025, succeeding Luca de Meo. Previously, he served as the group's Chief Purchasing, Partnerships and Public Affairs Officer and had been a member of the Leadership Team of Renault Group.

== Biography ==
Provost graduated from École polytechnique and École des Mines de Paris, where he obtained the title of Chief Engineer of the Corps des Mines. He began his career at the Ministry of the Economy and Finance in the Treasury Department, and was then appointed industrial advisor to the Minister of Defense.

Provost joined Renault in 2002. Prior to that, he served as an advisor to Alain Richard, the French Minister of Defence, from 1999 to 2002.

Provost was managing director of Renault-Nissan Portugal from 2005 to 2008. He became chief operating officer of Renault Russia in 2010, before becoming president and chief executive of Renault Samsung Motors in 2011.

In 2016, he was appointed Director of Operations for Renault in China, and in 2017, he assumed responsibility for operations in the Asia-Pacific region while retaining his duties in China.

In October 2020, he was appointed Director of International Development and Partnerships for Renault Group.

In January 2022, François Provost became Head of Public Affairs for Renault Group.

On February 1, 2023, he became Chief Purchasing Officer of the Renault Group and managing director of the Alliance Purchasing Organization (APO).

=== Appointment as CEO of Renault ===
In July 2025, the Board of Directors of the Renault Group announced the appointment of François Provost to succeed Luca de Meo as chief executive officer. He then became chief executive officer of Renault S.A. and Chairman of Renault s.a.s. for a four-year term.

François Provost assumes leadership of Renault Group during a period of significant industrial transition, characterized by the shift toward electrification, the development of new manufacturing technologies, and increased competition, particularly from Chinese automakers. The industry context is further complicated by geopolitical tensions and global market volatility. His background includes experience in Asian markets and the management of international partnerships.

In March 2026, he presented a new strategic plan named "futuREady", which aims to expand electrification and introduce several new models by 2030. Under its strategic plan, the company announced the launch of 36 new models, with a focus on hybrid and electric vehicles by 2030, as well as international expansion to support growth. He also pledges to defend European industrial autonomy while maintaining strategic partnerships with countries such as China.
