= Renault Megane E-Tech Electric =

Battery electric hatchback car

Renault Mégane E-Tech Electric
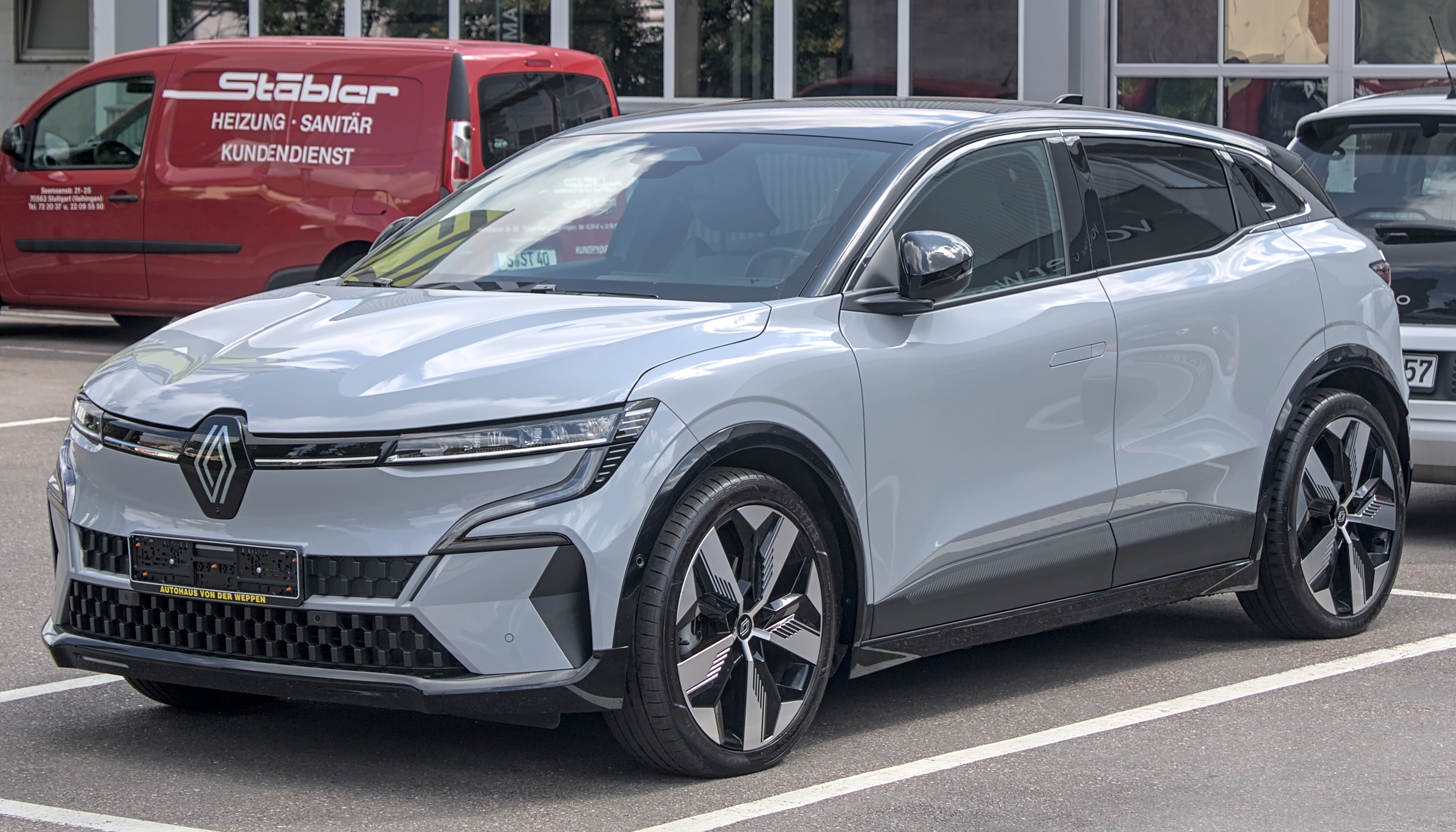

Overview
- Manufacturer: Renault
- Model code: BCB
- Also called: Renault Mégane eVision (concept)
- Production: 2022–present
- Assembly: France: Douai (Douai Renault Factory)

Body and chassis
- Class: Small family car
- Body style: 5-door hatchback
- Layout: Front-motor, front-wheel-drive
- Platform: AmpR Medium
- Related: Renault Scenic E-Tech

Powertrain
- Electric motor: EESM; 96 kW (129 hp; 131 PS); - 250 N⋅m (184 lb⋅ft); 160 kW (215 hp; 218 PS); - 300 N⋅m (221 lb⋅ft)
- Battery: 40 kW·h / 60 kW·h, 400 V
- Electric range: WLTP: 300 km (190 mi) 40 kWh; 450 km (280 mi) 60 kWh 96 kW; 470 km (290 mi) 60 kWh 160 kW
- Plug-in charging: AC: 22 kW; DC: 85 kw (40 kWh); 130 kW (60 kWh)

Dimensions
- Wheelbase: 2,685 mm (105.7 in)
- Length: 4,199 mm (165.3 in)
- Width: 1,768 mm (69.6 in)
- Height: 1,505 mm (59.3 in)
- Kerb weight: 1,624–1,650 kg (3,580–3,638 lb)

Chronology
- Predecessor: Renault Mégane

The Renault Mégane E-Tech Electric is an electric car produced by French manufacturer Renault since 2022. It is a five-door hatchback in the small family car market segment. Using the Mégane nameplate, it is the first Renault model based on a dedicated battery electric vehicle platform known as the AmpR Medium. It was previewed by the Renault Mégane eVision concept car in 2020.

== Overview ==
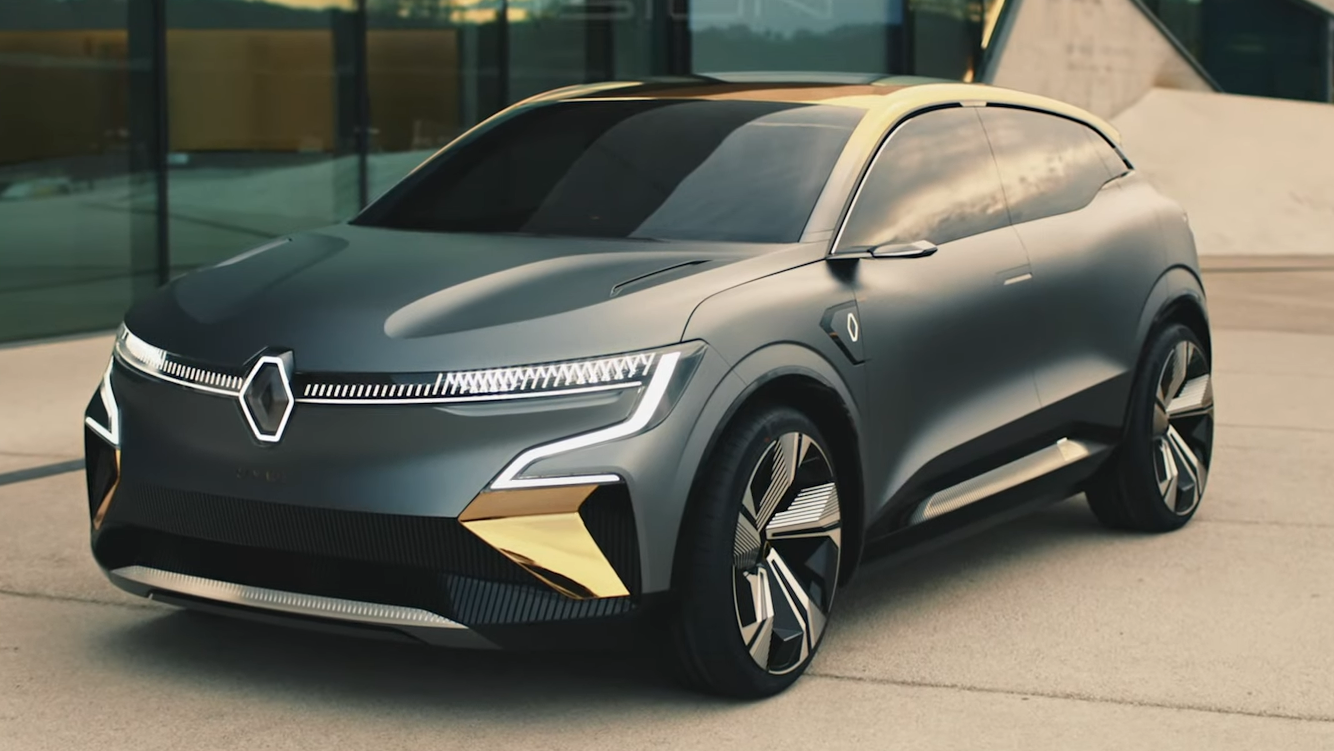
Renault Mégane eVision

The Renault Mégane eVision was a concept car unveiled in October 2020, previewing the Mégane E-Tech. The Mégane E-Tech was subsequently previewed by a near-production prototype in June 2021. The production version was revealed at the 2021 IAA in Munich in September 2021, and sales in Europe started in February 2022. In early 2023, the model was intended to go on sale in Australia at the end of 2023, with Renault's Australian distributor saying supply was limited by high-demand in Europe and that they were viewing the Mégane E-Tech as "a 2024 model".

Production of the internal-combustion engine powered Renault Mégane IV initially continued alongside production of the newer electric model. The car uses the CMF‑EV platform, which it shares with the larger Nissan Ariya model. The car received a five-star safety rating from Euro NCAP.

The vehicle integrates the Google navigation and services system (openR Link).

=== Design ===
Two prototypes were initially presented, with Renault chief-executive-officer Luca de Meo choosing the one with the "sporty" design and the company's design chief commenting on the car's aerodynamics, calling it an "Electric GTi". The car has been noted for having proportions that make its size hard to judge in photographs, being slightly shorter than many other family hatchbacks. The battery is located underneath the floor of the car, and thus the cabin is raised slightly compared to the combustion-engine powered Megane, being 50 millimetres (2.0 in) taller than the Mégane IV. The design has elements which some find reminiscent of 4x4s, however various automotive publications describe it as a hatchback with design elements from coupés and crossovers. Euro NCAP classify it as a small family car.

The car has a high seating position with limited headroom for rear passengers, although the front is considered more spacious by motor journalists. The Mégane's high window sill line and small windows were criticized for having a very enclosed, oppressive and claustrophobic feel. Its physical temperature controls, however, were acknowledged for not being distracting while driving.

The Mégane has a boot capacity of 440 litres (16 cu ft). The majority of its capacity comes from its depth rather than its length, leading it to have a high loading lip. The car does not have a front boot, due to the presence of motors and other equipment within the bonnet. The Megane does have limited rear visibility, but this has been helped by a wide-angle camera rear-view mirror.

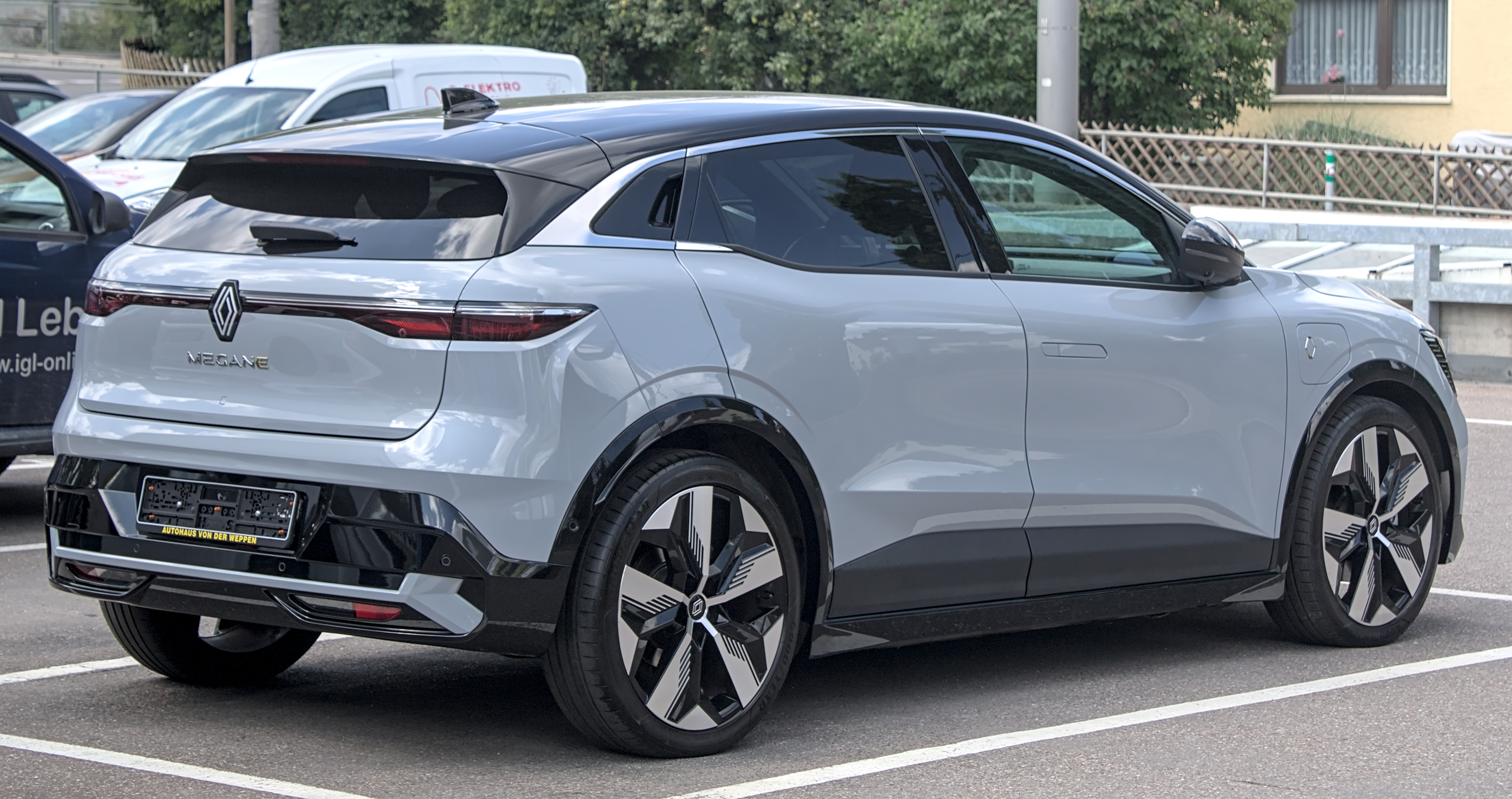
Rear view

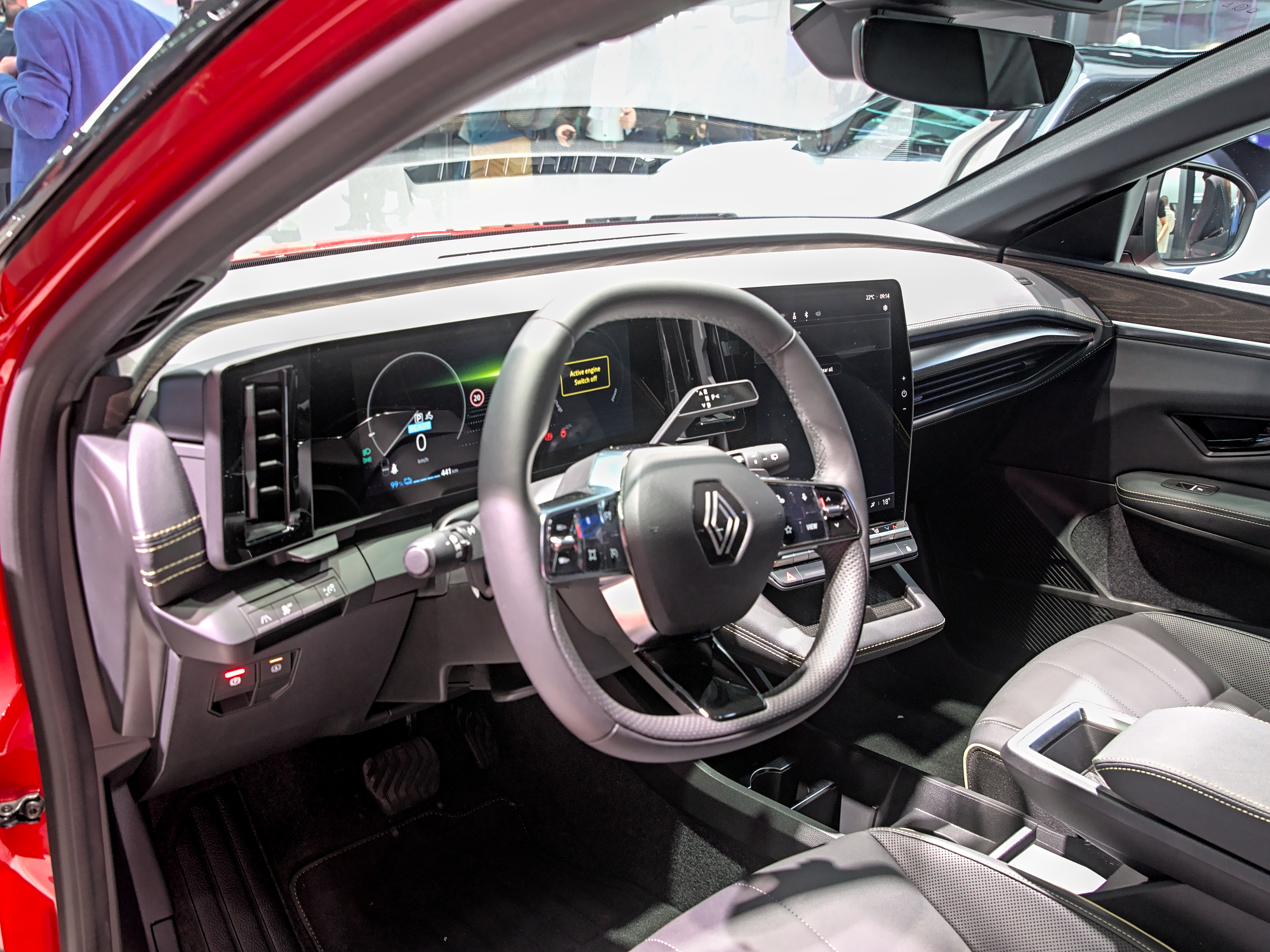
Interior

=== Facelift (2026) ===
On 22 June 2026, Renault unveiled a facelifted version, featuring a new 67 kWh lithium iron phosphate battery offering up to 500 km (310 mi) of WLTP range, a maximum DC fast charging rate of 165 kW, and a redesigned front end with diamond-pattern daytime running lights.

Front

Rear

== Powertrain ==
The Mégane E-Tech is available with two different batteries (40 kWh or 60 kWh) and two different traction motors with outputs of 96 kW (129 hp) and 250 Nm (180 lbft), or 160 kW (215 hp) and 300 Nm (220 lbft). The battery measures 1960 mm (77.2 in) x 110 mm (4.3 in) x 1450 mm (57.1 in). Anticipated range is 300 to 470 km (190 to 290 mi), depending on the original capacity, based on the WLTP cycle.

The 60 kWh battery that is compatible with fast-charging rates of up to 130 kW, allowing it to reclaim 200 km (120 mi) of range in 30 minutes. The electric motor produces 160 kW (215 hp; 218 PS) and 300 N⋅m (221 lb⋅ft) of torque, powering the front wheels and delivering a claimed zero to 100 km/h (62 mph) acceleration in 7.5 seconds, but several motoring journals have clocked it at 6.9 seconds. It will also be equipped with 26 advanced driver-assistance systems for its Level 2 semi-autonomous driving capabilities. The batteries have been placed in the car in a manner intended to insulate occupants from tyre noise.

== Safety ==
Euro NCAP test results Renault Megane E-Tech EV60 220ch 'Techno' (LHD) (2022)
Test	Points	%
Overall:	5 /5 stars	
Adult occupant:	32.6	85%
Child occupant:	43.3	88%
Pedestrian:	35.4	65%
Safety assist:	12.7	79%

ANCAP test results Renault Megane E-Tech (2022, aligned with Euro NCAP)
Test	Points	%
Overall:	5 /5 stars	
Adult occupant:	32.61	85%
Child occupant:	43.14	88%
Pedestrian:	35.44	65%
Safety assist:	12.82	80%

== Sales ==
Year	Total Production
2021	609
2022	25,680
2023	54,629
2024	30,260
2025	17,660

== Awards ==
In 2022, the journalists on the Autobest jury, hailing from 32 European countries, voted the Renault Megane E-Tech Electric as "Ecobest 2022".

== Facelift ==
In 2025, the Mégane E-Tech received a subtle facelift and the new Esprit Alpine trim level was added.
