= AMPS =

AMPS or Amps may refer to:

== Amps ==
- Abbreviation of the plural for ampere, a unit of electric current
- Abbreviation of the plural for amplifier, a circuit or device that amplifies electrical signals
- The Amps, an American rock band

== AMPS ==
- 2-Acrylamido-2-methylpropane sulfonic acid, an acidic monomer
- Advanced Mobile Phone System, a 1G analog cellular mobile phone system
- Advanced Modular Processing System, the original implementation of flow-based programming
- Amplified musculoskeletal pain syndrome, in which excessive, acute, and chronic pain is observed for which no overt primary cause can be found or surmised
- Armor Modeling and Preservation Society, an international hobby club based in the US
- Association Medicine / Pharmacy Sciences, a French association of students enrolled in PharmD/PhD or MD/PhD curriculum
- Association of Motion Picture Sound, a UK association of film and television sound professionals
- AMPS firewall, a black hole firewall proposed in 2012 by Ahmed Almheiri, Donald Marolf, Joseph Polchinski, and James Sully

== See also ==
- Ampere-second (As), the coulomb (C); amp-sec
- Amp (disambiguation)
- Amped (disambiguation)
- Ampere (disambiguation)
