= Renault Scenic E-Tech =

Battery electric compact crossover SUV

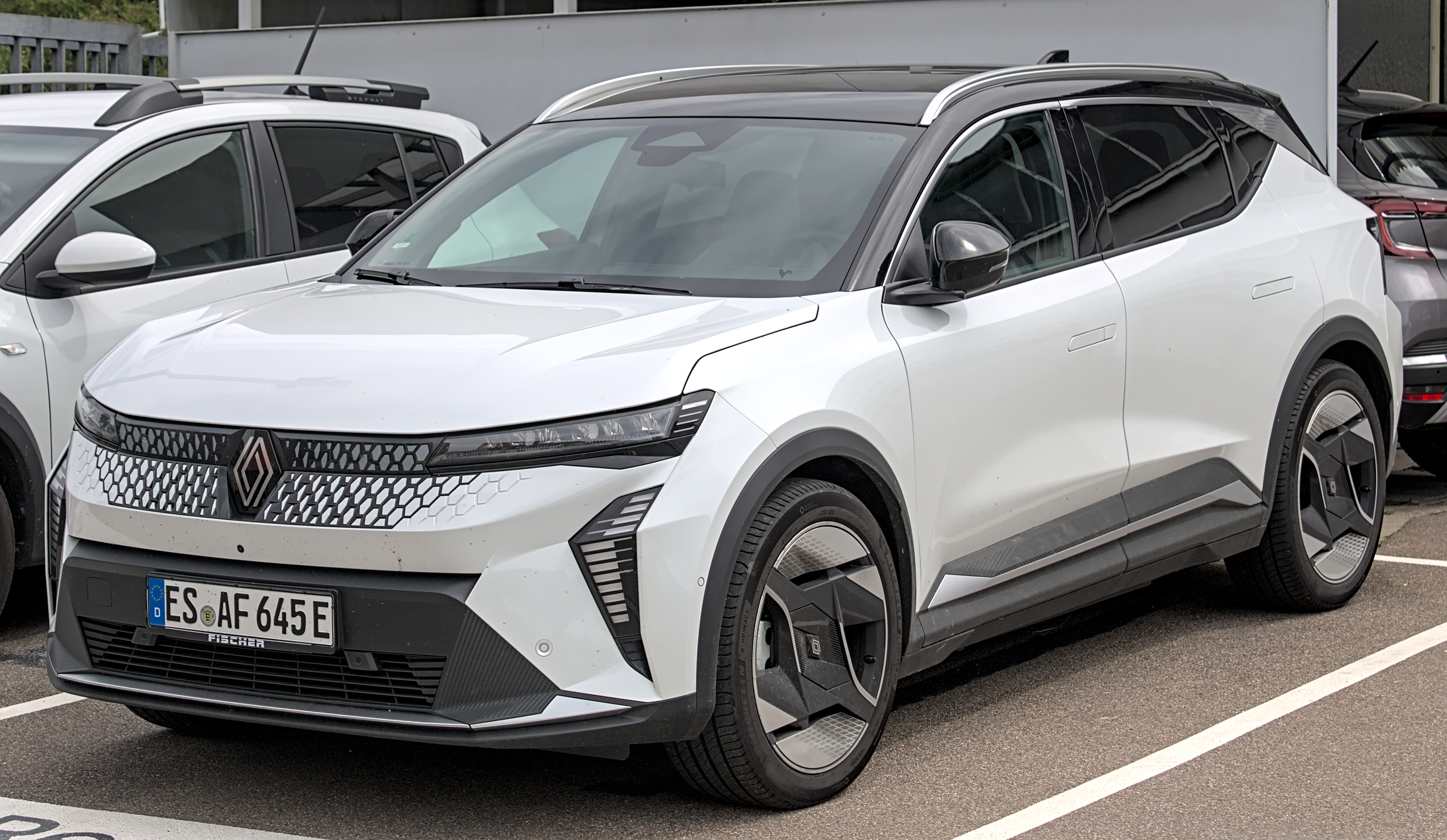
- Renault Scénic E-Tech

Overview
- Manufacturer: Renault
- Also called: Mitsubishi Eclipse Cross (2025–present); Renault Scénic Vision (concept)
- Production: 2024–present
- Assembly: France: Douai (Douai Renault Factory)
- Designer: Gilles Vidal

Body and chassis
- Class: Compact crossover SUV (C)
- Body style: 5-door SUV
- Layout: Front-motor, front-wheel-drive
- Platform: AmpR Medium
- Related: Renault Megane E-Tech; Nissan Ariya

Powertrain
- Power output: 125 kW (170 PS; 168 hp); 160 kW (218 PS; 215 hp)
- Battery: 60 kWh LG nickel-manganese-cobalt; 87 kWh LG nickel-manganese-cobalt

Dimensions
- Wheelbase: 2,785 mm (109.6 in)
- Length: 4,470 mm (176.0 in)
- Width: 1,864 mm (73.4 in)
- Height: 1,571 mm (61.9 in)
- Kerb weight: 1,842 kg (4,061 lb)

Chronology
- Predecessor: Renault Scénic; Mitsubishi Eclipse Cross (first generation)

The Renault Scenic E-Tech is a battery electric compact crossover SUV that is produced by French automaker Renault from 2024. It was previewed as a concept was shown in May 2022 called the Renault Scénic Vision, with the production model having an estimated release date of 2024. The car was elected the 2024 European Car of the Year.

== Overview ==
=== Concept ===
The Scénic Vision concept car was presented on 19 May 2022. Initially finished in black, the Scénic Vision body colour was changed to white during the 2022 Paris Motor Show.

The concept car is based on the CMF-EV platform. It has a coach door with no B-pillar, which allows easy access to the passenger compartment, and it is designed with 70% recycled materials.

Inside, the Scenic Vision has a floor made from recycled milk bottles and pipes. The seats are made of polyester. According to Renault, all passenger contact surfaces are fully recycled. The cabin of the Scénic Vision has small adjustable screens offering shortcuts and features camera mirrors.

The Scénic E-Tech features the Solarbay electrochromic panoramic glass roof. The Scénic E-Tech features an electrochromic glass roof, sold under the name Solarbay. It also incorporates the OpenR Link system.

The Scénic Vision has a 160 kW (218 PS) electric motor placed on the rear axle. It is powered by a 40 kWh lithium-ion battery, recharged by a 15 kW hydrogen fuel cell that acts as a range extender. Its estimated range is about 800 km (500 mi).

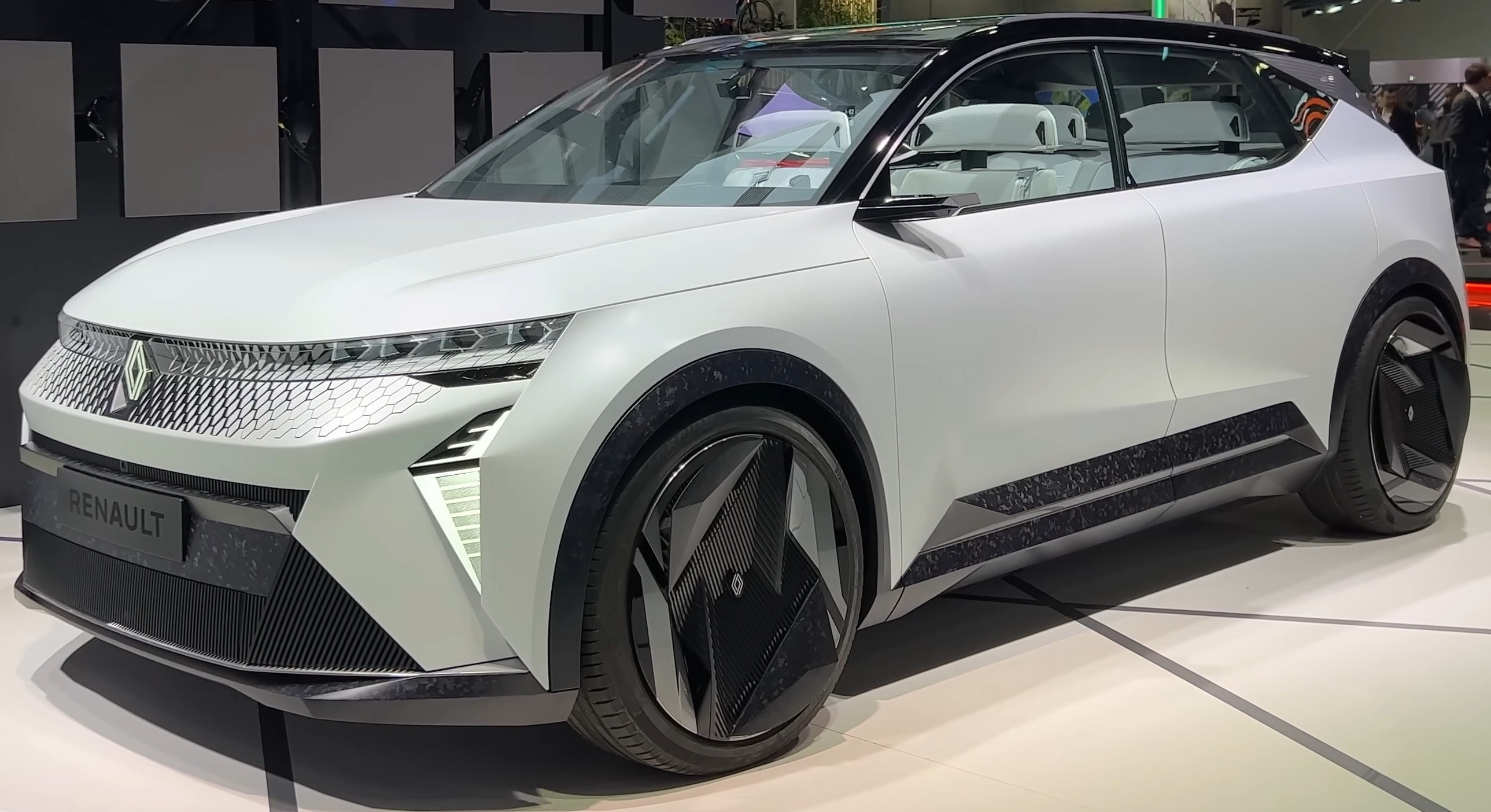
Scenic Vision

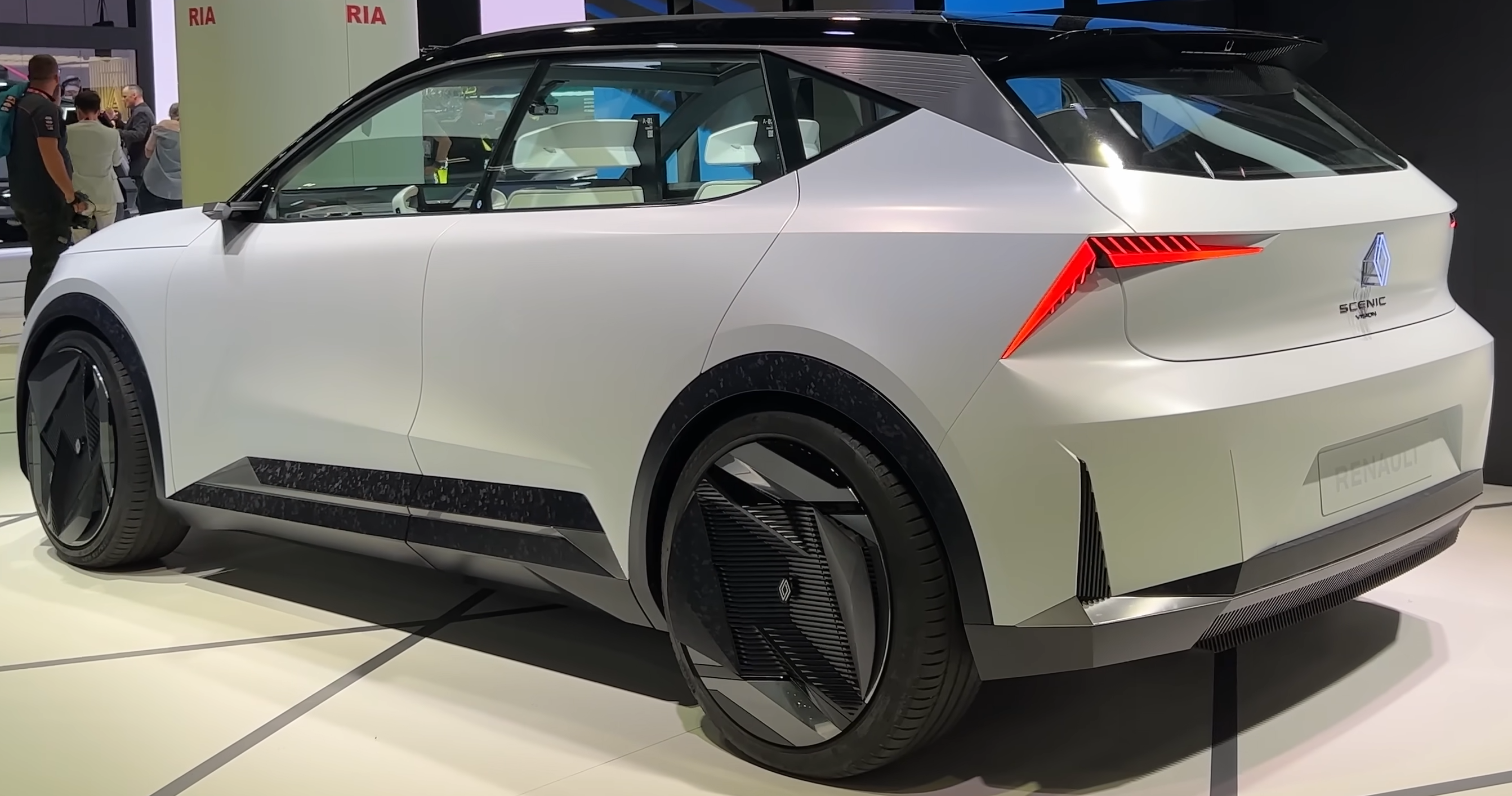
Rear view

=== Production version ===
The production model was released in September 2023. Powered by LG nickel-manganese-cobalt (NMC) batteries, it is available in two versions.

The Standard range version uses a 60 kWh battery produces 125 kW (170 PS; 168 hp) and 280 N⋅m (28.6 kg⋅m; 207 lb⋅ft) of torque. It has a claimed range of 420 km (260 mi) in the WLTP cycle. The High range version is powered by a 160 kW (218 PS; 215 hp) motor and 300 N⋅m (30.6 kg⋅m; 221 lb⋅ft) of torque, paired with a 87 kWh battery with an estimated range of over 620 km (390 mi).

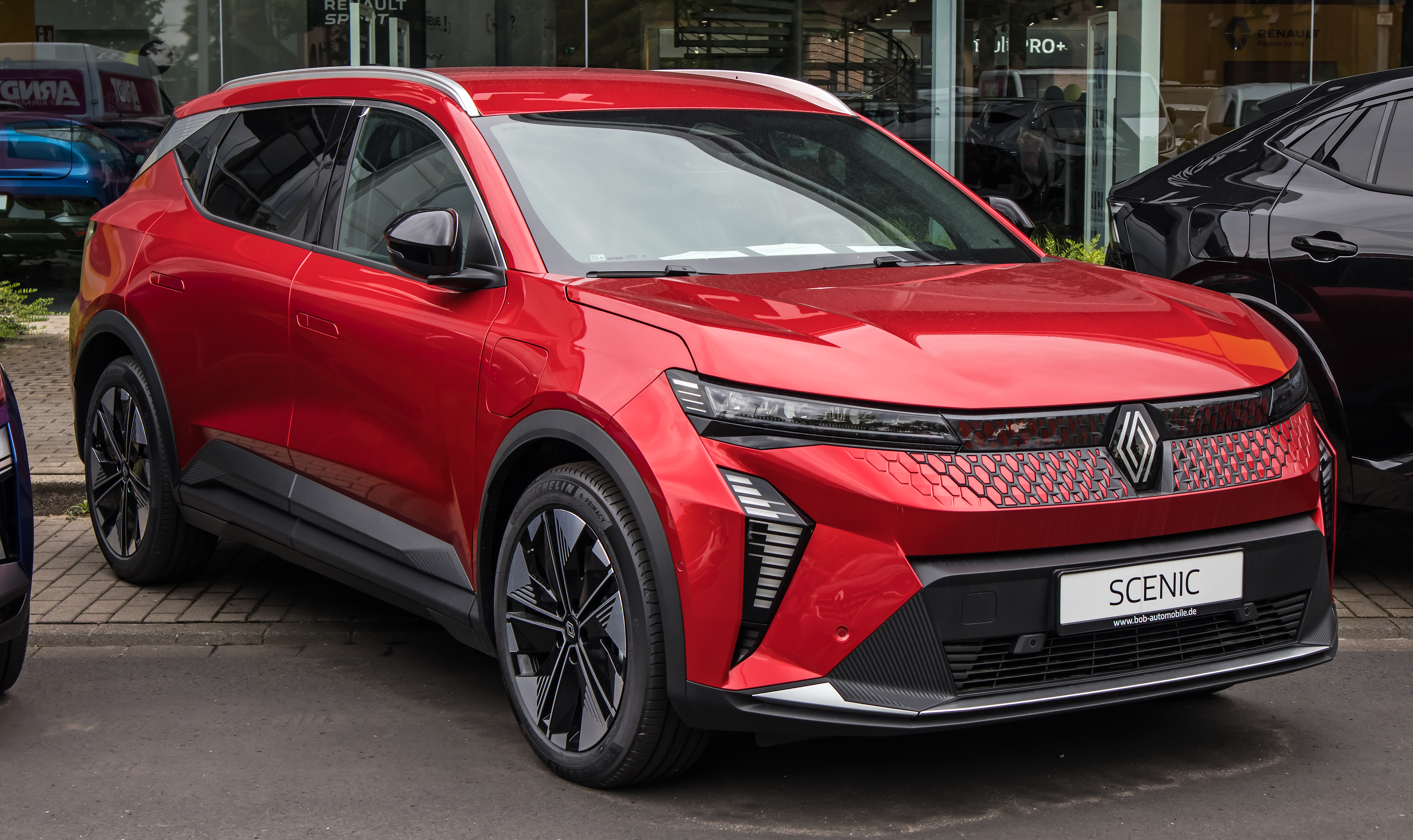
Front view

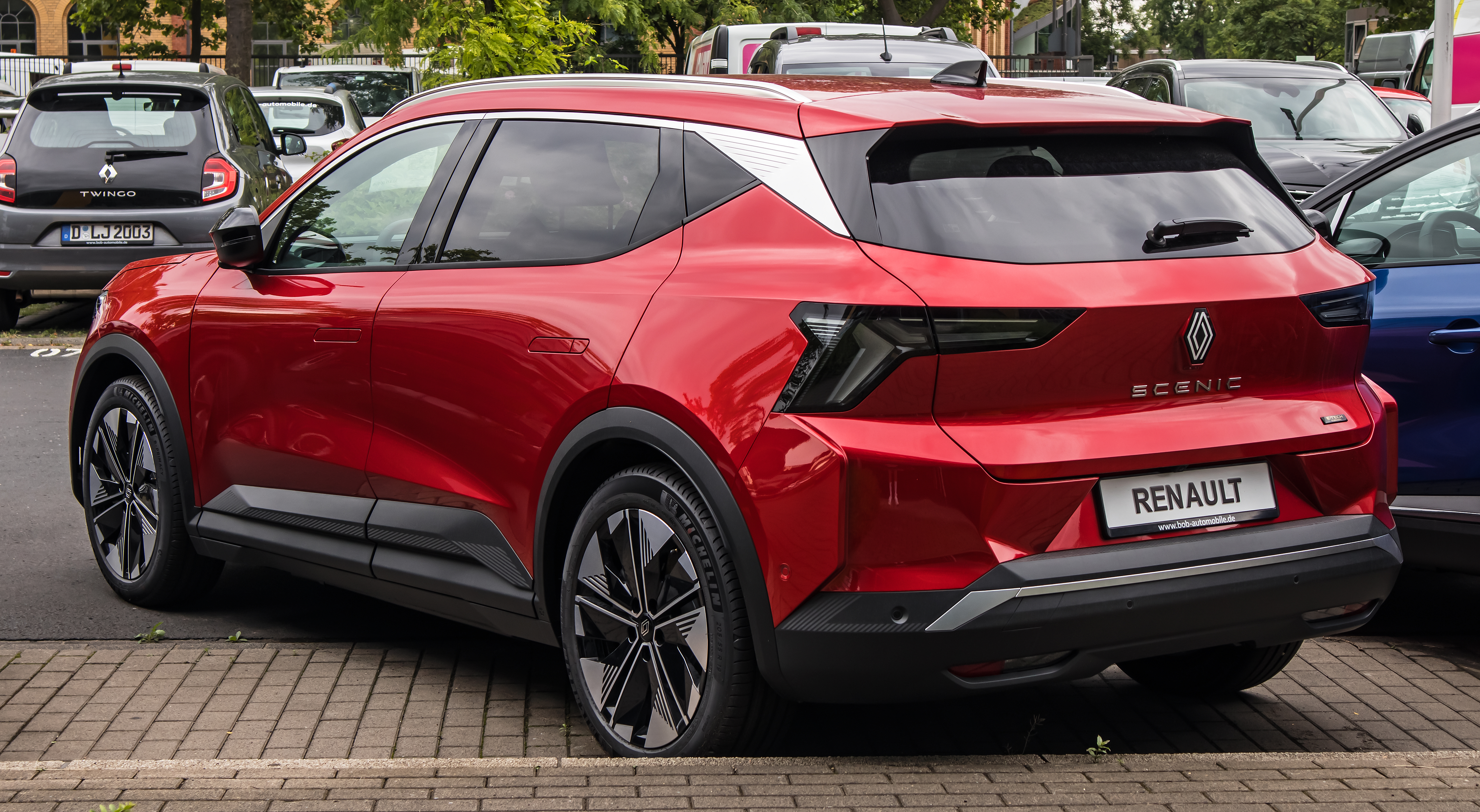
Rear view

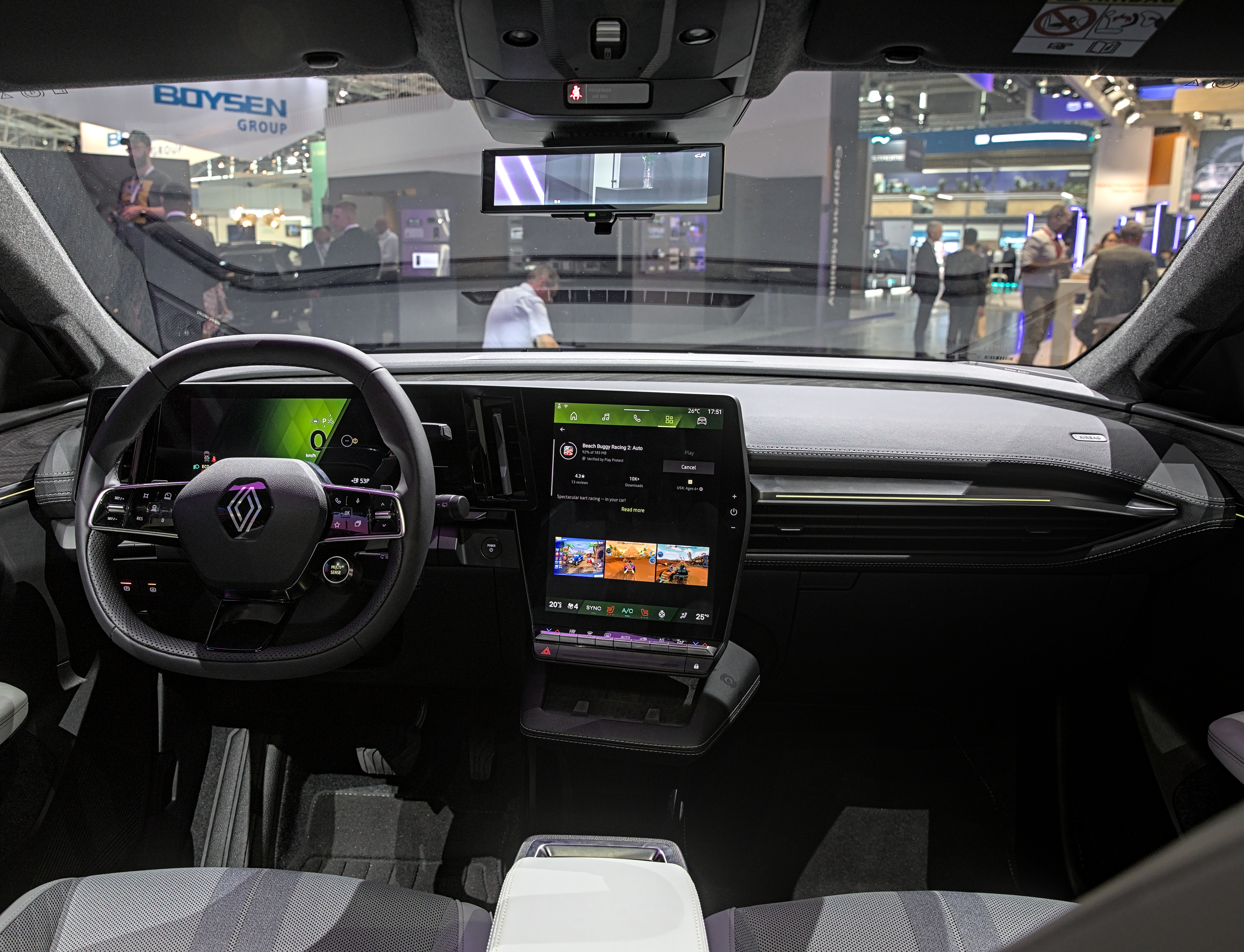
Interior (Scenic E-Tech)

=== Mitsubishi Eclipse Cross EV ===
In December 2023, Mitsubishi Motors announced that it will launch the Mitsubishi Eclipse Cross EV based on the Scenic. The model will have a different design and will be manufactured alongside it in the same factory. It was unveiled on 18 September 2025 in Europe.

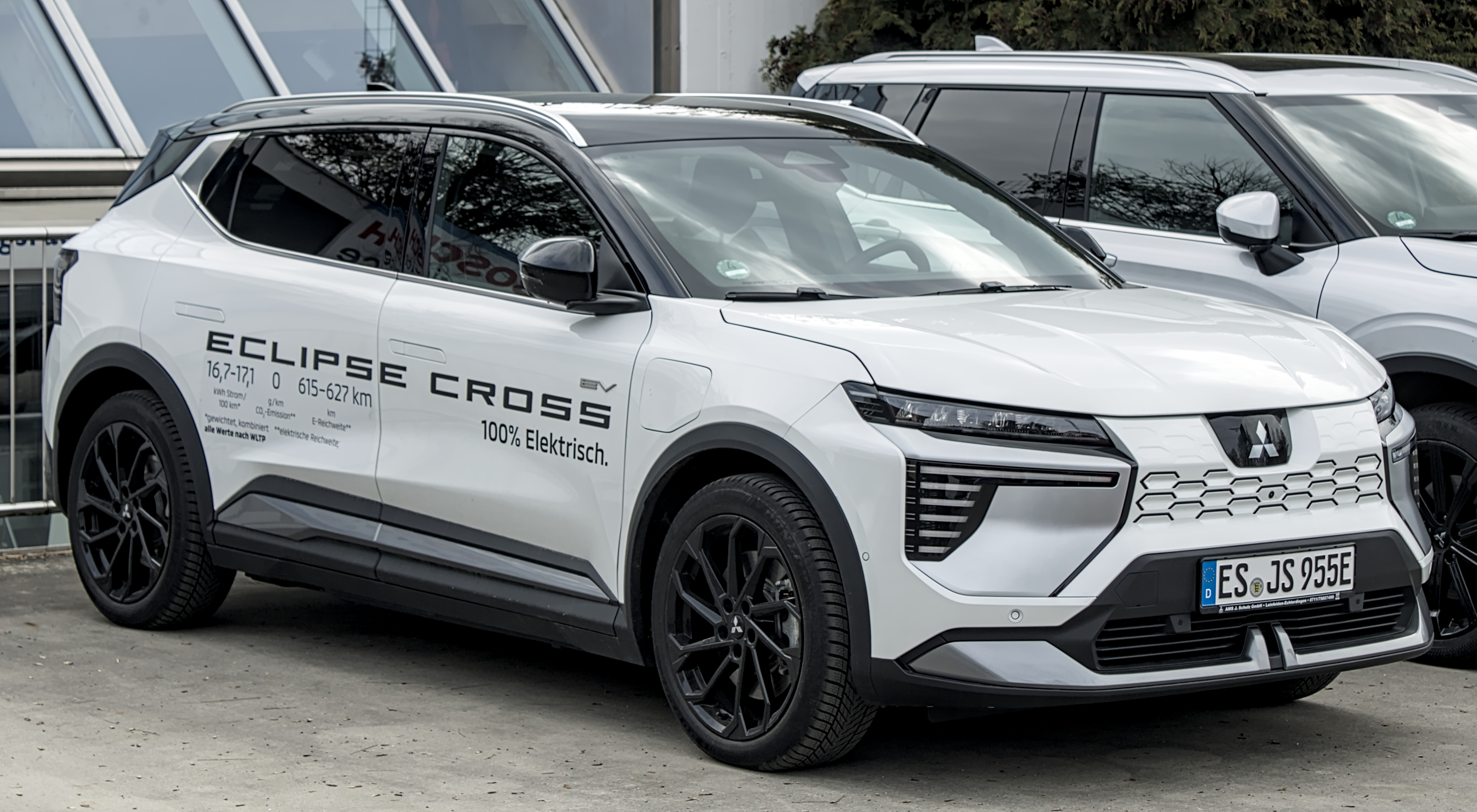
Mitsubishi Eclipse Cross EV

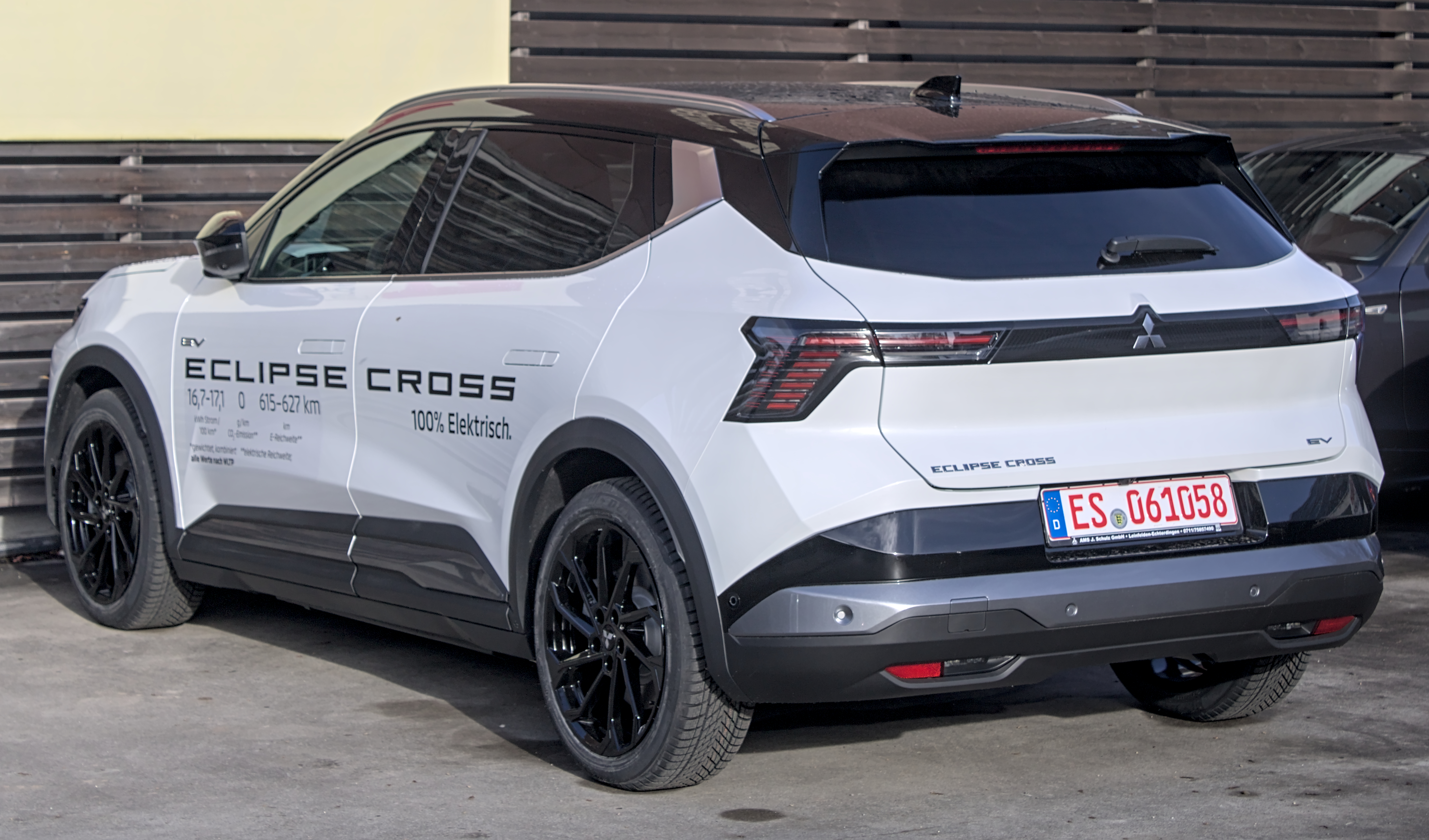
Eclipse Cross EV rear view

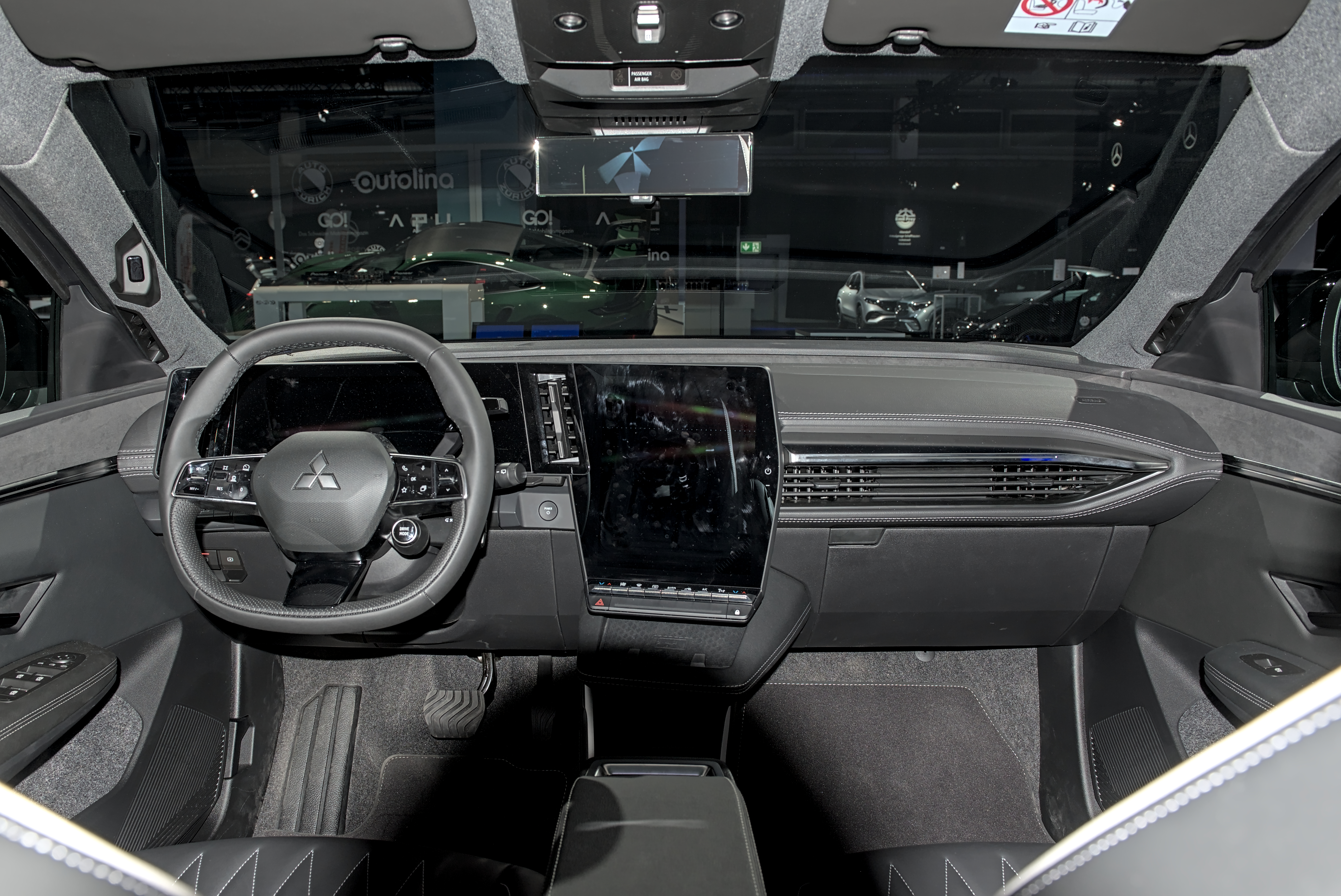
Eclipse Cross EV interior

== Safety ==
Euro NCAP test results Renault Scenic E-Tech EV87kwh 220ch - 4x2 Techno (LHD) (2022)
Test	Points	%
Overall:	5 /5 stars	
Adult occupant:	33.7	88%
Child occupant:	43.7	89%
Pedestrian:	42	77%
Safety assist:	13.8	85%

ANCAP test results Renault Scenic E-Tech (2022, aligned with Euro NCAP)
Test	Points	%
Overall:	5 /5 stars	
Adult occupant:	33.74	88%
Child occupant:	45.48	92%
Pedestrian:	42.00	77%
Safety assist:	13.63	85%

== Awards ==
The Renault Scenic E-Tech was chosen as the European Car of the Year in 2024.

== Production ==
Calendar year	Production
2023	<344
2024	34,282
2025	35,687
