= Amped =

Amped may refer to:

- Amped video games series:
  - Amped: Freestyle Snowboarding
  - Amped 2
  - Amped 3
- Amped (116 Clique EP)
- Amped (Seven Witches album), 2005
- Amped (Those Darn Accordions EP), 2002
- Amped (novel), 2012
- A.M.P.E.D., a 2007 American television series

== See also ==
- Amp (disambiguation)
- AMPS (disambiguation)
- Ampere (disambiguation)
