= Amp =

Amp or AMP may refer to:

- Ampere, a unit of electric current, often shortened to amp
- Amplifier, a device that increases the amplitude of a signal

== Arts and entertainment ==
=== Music ===
- After Midnight Project, Los Angeles alternative rock band
- Amp (band), UK
- AMP (magazine), US, 2003–2013
- Annual Australian Music Prize
- MTV's Amp, 1997 compilation

=== Other uses in arts and entertainment ===
- Amp (TV series), music video show
- The Amp, a British music video channel
- The Amp (St. Augustine), outdoor amphitheater in St. Augustine, Florida, U.S.
- AMP Radio Networks, Malaysia

== Organizations ==
- Africa Muslim Party, a South African political party
- Alliance of the Presidential Majority (Alliance pour la majorité présidentielle), Democratic Republic of Congo
- America Party, a U.S. political passion
- American Manufacturing and Packaging, Cookeville, Tennessee, US
- American Muslims for Palestine, Illinois
- Americans for Medical Progress
- Ameriprise Financial, NYSE symbol
- AMP Fit, a U.S. fitness equipment brand
- AMP Incorporated, U.S. connector company
- AMP Limited, Australian financial services company
- Amp Electric Vehicles
- Anjaman Mozareen Punjab, organisation for land rights in Pakistan
- AMP Singapore, a Singapore-based organization formerly known as Association of Muslim Professionals
- AMP (streamer collective), American internet streaming collective
- Ardagh Metal Packaging, a subsidiary of the Ardagh Group
- Association for Molecular Pathology, a professional association focused on molecular diagnostics

== People ==
- Amp Lee (born 1971), American football coach
- Air Member for Personnel, RAF appointment
- Air Member for Personnel (Australia), RAAF

== Places ==
- Advanced Manufacturing Park, UK
- Ampanihy Airport (IATA code), Madagascar
- Área Metropolitana do Porto, Portugal
- Atlantic Motorsport Park, near Shubenacadie, Nova Scotia, Canada

== Science and technology ==
=== Computing ===
- &amp; HTML code for the ampersand symbol (&)
- AMP (software stack), "Apache, MySQL and PHP"
- Asymmetric multiprocessing
- C++ AMP, C++ Accelerated Massive Parallelism
- Accelerated Mobile Pages, a 2015 web component framework from Google

=== Biology ===
- Adenosine monophosphate, a nucleotide found in RNA
- AMP deaminase, a human enzyme encoded by the AMPD1 gene
- Antimicrobial peptides, immune system peptides
- Ampicillin, a common antibiotic

=== Other uses in science and technology ===
- Affect misattribution procedure, a psychological measure of implicit attitudes
- Auto Mag Pistol

== Other uses ==
- Administrative Monetary Penalty, a civil penalty
- Amp Energy, a drink
- Amplified Bible, an English translation
- Asiatic mode of production, a Marxist theory on historical Asian socioeconomic organization
- Asset Management Plan, in infrastructure management

== See also ==
- AMPS (disambiguation)
- Amped (disambiguation)
- Ampere (disambiguation)
