= Douai Renault Factory =

Car plant belonging to the Renault Group

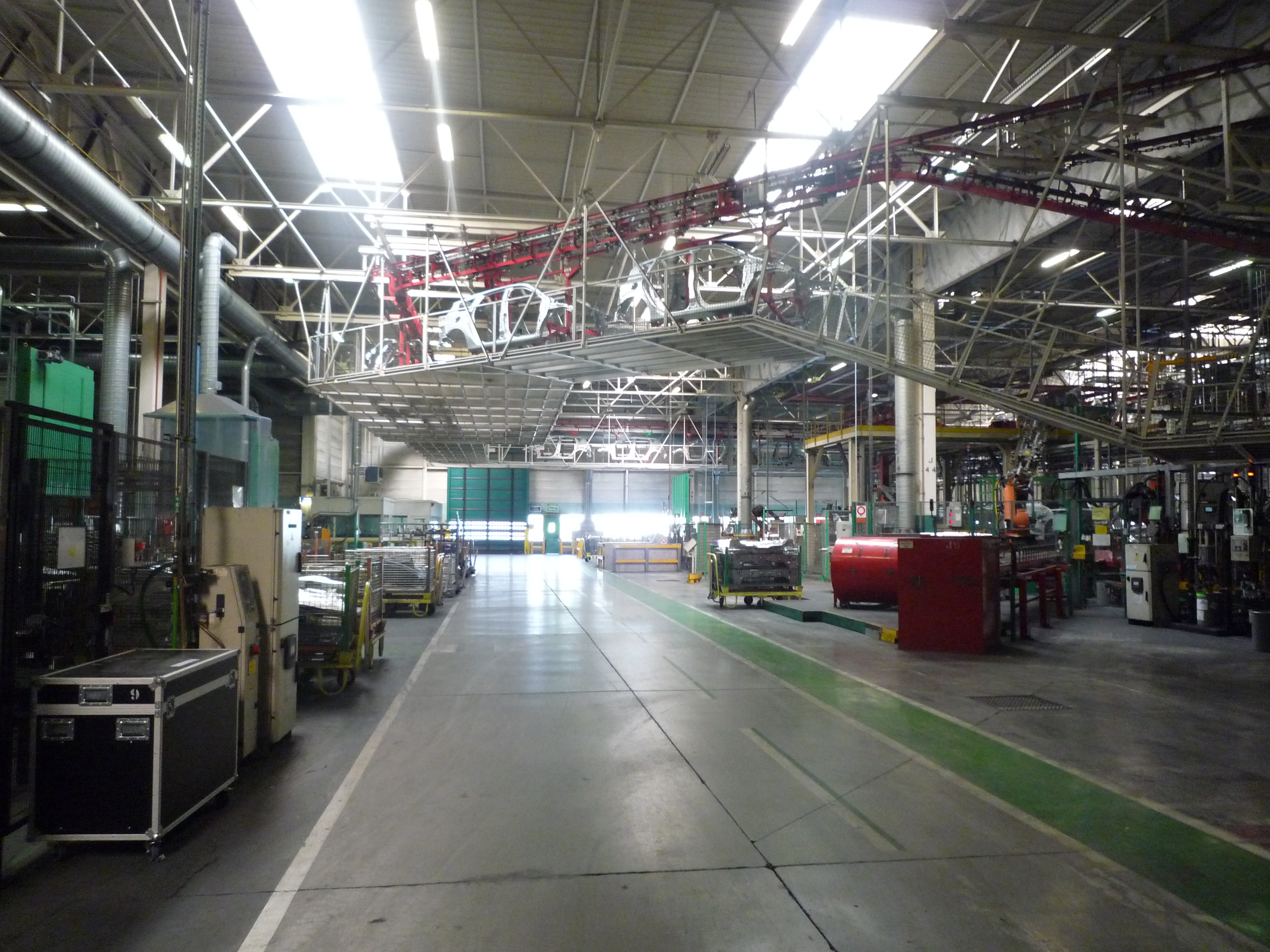
- View of the interior of the factory at the end of September 2010.
- Built: 1970
- Operated: 1975
- Location: Cuincy and Lambres-lez-Douai, near Douai (Hauts-de-France)
- Coordinates: 50.36385°N 3.02775°E
- Products: Automobiles
- Owner: Renault

The Douai Renault factory is a car plant belonging to the Renault Group, opened in 1970 at Douai in the industrial basin of the Nord department, not far from Lille (Rijsel).

== History ==
Construction of the plant received a go-ahead in 1968, with a formal announcement of the project coming a year later. Douai was chosen because it was well located at the heart of the industrial centre of gravity of the EEC with excellent road links to major industry and population centres. It was also in an area with a large pool of available workers, due to the running down of coal mining in the area.

The first car put into serial production at the plant was the Renault 5, initially in small batches, starting early in 1975. The principal production location for the little car was, and remained, at Flins, however. Towards the end of 1975 production started at Douai, in much larger batches, of the Renault 14, building up stock ahead of the launch of Renault's first head-on Golf competitor in 1976. Volumes in 1976 were 325 Renault 14 and 50 R5's per diem. The plant has continued to specialise in the manufacture of cars in the small family car segment.

By 1977 the plant was employing 7,000 people. This was a period of rapid automation in car production, and as a new plant Douai was more highly automated than most. It was perhaps a reflection of the fact that all the jobs at the plant were then new jobs, that the robots were viewed with some affection by some members of the workforce. At the end of the body assembly shop much of the main welding together of the pressed panels was undertaken by a team of four "Unimate" robots christened, by their human colleagues, Theophile, Arsine, Marcel and Modeste. Visitors at this time were also impressed by the ample space in the plant available for further expansion.

However, in 2008 Douai suffered a blow when production of mainstream Renault Mégane model was concentrated on the Palencia plant: hitherto the two plants had assembled the model in parallel, but sales volumes no longer justified that arrangement. Douai retained the sporty low volume Mégane CC Coupé and Cabriolet.

== Production ==
=== Historical production ===
The following Renault models have been manufactured at Douai:

- Renault 5 (1972–1985)
- Renault 14 (1976–1983)
- Renault 9/Renault 11 (1981–1989)
- Renault 19 (1988–1996)
- Renault Mégane I (1996–2002)
- Renault Scénic I (4X2 and RX4) (1996–2003)
- Renault Mégane II (saloon and coupé) (2003–2009)
- Renault Scénic II (2003–2009)
- Renault Grand Scénic II (2003–2009)
- Renault Scénic III (2009–2015)
- Renault Grand Scénic III (2009–2015)
- Renault Talisman (2015–2022)
- Renault Scénic IV (2016–2022)
- Renault Espace V (2015–2023)

=== Current production ===
- Renault Megane E-Tech Electric (2022–present)
- Renault 5 E-Tech (2024–present)
- Renault Scenic E-Tech (2024–present)
- Nissan Micra EV (2025–present)
- Mitsubishi Eclipse Cross EV (2025–present)
