= Ampère (car) =

The Ampère was a French combustion automobile built at Billancourt from 1906 to 1909. The car featured a 10/16 hp four-cylinder engine driving through an electric clutch; according to the advertising material, this made for "variation of speed by electric transmission, with neither dynamo nor accumulators".
