= Ampara (disambiguation) =

Ampara (Amparai) may refer to:

- Ampara, a town in Eastern Province, Sri Lanka
- Ampara District, a district in Eastern Province, Sri Lanka
- Ampara Electoral District, a multi-member electoral district of Sri Lanka
- Ampara Electoral District (1960-1989), a former single-member electoral district of Sri Lanka
- Ampara Military Base, military base close to the town of Ampara
- SLAF Ampara, a Sri Lanka Air Force base located near the town of Ampara
