= Ampere WS-1 =

1985 laptop

WS-1
- Manufacturer: Ampere, Inc.
- Type: Laptop
- Released: November 1985; 40 years ago
- Operating system: Big.DOS
- CPU: Hitachi HD68000 at 8 MHz
- Memory: 32–512 KB of RAM

The WS-1 was a laptop manufactured by the Japanese computer company Ampere, Inc. Unveiled in June 1984 as the BIG.APL and later released as the WS-1 in November 1985, the laptop was noted by journalists for its striking case design—rendered by Kumeo Tamura, one of the principal designers of the Datsun 240Z. Also noted was its early use of Motorola's 68000 microprocessor and the decision to use APL as its programming environment of choice.

== Development and specifications ==
Ampere, Inc., a Japanese computer systems company founded by Takashi Kusanagi in the early 1980s, first announced the WS-1 in June 1984 under the prototype name BIG.APL. The WS-1 weighs 16.5 pounds (7.5 kg) and occupies a footprint of 12 by 12 by 3 inches (30.5 by 30.5 by 7.6 cm). Technology journalists noted the laptop's striking, airfoil-esque case design, rendered by Japanese industrial designer Kumeo Tamura—better known as a principal behind the Datsun 240Z coupé. Powering the WS-1 is the HD68000—a second-source version of Motorola's 32-bit 68000 microprocessor—manufactured by Hitachi and running at a clock speed of 8 MHz. The laptop is also designed around VMEbus, an open-standard computer bus built upon the 68000. Both the 68000 and VMEbus were seldom used by laptops at the time of its release.

The WS-1's VMEbus accommodates expansions via a port on the back, allowing the user to connect the laptop to external devices including hard drives, floppy drives, and further RAM. Ampere themselves sold a 3.5-inch floppy disk drive exclusively for use with the WS-1. Also present on the WS-1 are two serial ports and a Centronics parallel port, a 300-baud modem, and a microcassette deck. The microcassette deck allows the user to store both programs, data, and voice recordings. Both saving programs and data to cassette was handled and voice recording was handled by the laptop's built-in operating system, Big.DOS. The WS-1 includes a built-in speaker and microphohe, allowing the laptop to be used as a handset, an answering machine, a call recorder and transcription machine.

The WS-1 sports three expansion cartridge slots, allowing the user to equip the machine with more RAM, with aftermarket software on ROMs, or with custom-burned EPROM software. On its announcement, the WS-1 was slated to come in multiple SKUs of varying amounts of CMOS RAM on board, with a 1-MB ceiling via RAM expansion cartridges in increments of 64 KB. The laptop was later manufactured as a single configuration set at 64 KB, expandable via the aforementioned cartridges to a lower RAM ceiling of 512 KB.

While Ampere designed the WS-1's hardware in Japan, they turned to the United States for software development. The company aimed WS-1 at users of APL, a programming language that uses graphic symbols to represent most functions and operators. To this end, the WS-1's 70-key QWERTY keyboard includes a second layer with APL symbols, activated via a function key actuated in tandem with the desired symbol. The WS-1's included APL programming environment of choice is Big.APL, an implementation of APL 68000 (itself a derivative of IBM's APL.SV). Big.APL runs on top of the laptop's built-in disk operating system, Big.DOS. Big.DOS also features a full-screen line editor, a word processor, a spreadsheet application, a modem utility, and a database program, all running in a windowing text-based user interface with multitasking capability. Both Big.DOS and Big.APL were designed by Philip Van Cleave.

Ampere originally designed the WS-1 with an abridged 80-column-16-line (480 × 128 pixel) LCD. They later expanded it to 25 columns (480 × 200 pixel). John J. Anderson, writing in Creative Computing, called the display an improvement over that included with the earlier Data General/One laptop: "[E]xtremely easy to read, even in less than optimal lighting conditions".

== Sales and legacy ==
Ampere delivered the first units of the WS-1 in Japan in November 1985. Workspace Computer, Inc., of Torrance, California, secured the rights to resell the WS-1 in the United States, while Nissei, a subsidiary of Nissan, secured the rights to resell it in the United Kingdom.

The WS-1 reportedly never shipped in the United States, according to Jalopnik, on account of the laptop failing to meet the FCC Class A RF emissions compliance. Due to its unique styling, use of APL, and ties to the Datsun 240Z, the WS-1 is now a collector's item.
