= Luca de Meo =

Italian automotive executive

- Luca de Meo in 2024
- Born: 13 June 1967 (age 59); Milan, Italy
- Education: Bocconi University
- Occupation: Chief executive
- Employer: Kering (2025-)
- Honours: Commander of the Order of Merit of the Italian Republic (2015); Grand Cross of the Order of Isabella the Catholic (2021); Knight of the French Legion of Honour (2022); Cavaliere of the Order of Merit for Labour (2022)

Luca de Meo (born 13 June 1967) is an Italian chief executive, CEO of luxury group Kering since 2025. He was previously CEO of the group Renault (2020-2025), CEO of SEAT (2015-2020), and CEO of Fiat Automobiles (2004-2009). He revived the iconic Fiat 500, created SEAT's premium brand Cupra, and turned Renault into a global electric vehicles manufacturer.

== Education ==
Luca de Meo was born in Milan. His family lived abroad in Brazil, Nigeria, Tanzania, and Ivory Coast. He studied at Bocconi University in Milan, graduating in 1991 with a degree in business administration.

== Career ==
De Meo began his career at Renault's regional sales in Italy in 1992. He transferred to Renault's Paris headquarters in 1994 to work with the marketing team. In 1998, he joined Toyota Europe where he became chief of product strategy in 2000.

In 2002, de Meo joined the Fiat Group as chief marketing of Lancia. In 2004, he was appointed CEO of Fiat Automobiles (passenger cars). After successfully driving the conception and launch of the iconic new Fiat 500 in 2007, he was appointed chief marketing officer of the Fiat Group in September 2007 and CEO of Alfa Romeo in December 2007 to revive the centennial brand, and CEO of Abarth. He resigned from his positions at the Fiat Group in January 2009.

In August 2009, he was appointed marketing and sales director of passenger cars for the group Volkswagen. He also held the positions of board of management member for sales and marketing at Audi AG, member of the supervisory boards of Ducati and Lamborghini, and chairman of the board of the group Volkswagen in Italy and Spain. In the midst of the 2015 Dieselgate, Volkswagen appointed de Meo CEO of SEAT to revive sales as other brands of the group were embroiled in the crisis. De Meo launched SEAT's first B-segment model (Ateca), SEAT's premium brand Cupra, and SEAT's first electric cars. In 2019, he inked a partnership with JAC Motors to develop SEAT in China. De Meo flipped SEAT around and made it one of Volkswagen's most dynamic brands. In January 2020, Luca de Meo resigned from his position of CEO of SEAT, rumored to be shortlisted for the vacant position of CEO of Renault.

In January 2020, he was appointed CEO of Renault (effective July 2020), tasked to put group back on track after the turbulent post-Ghosn era. His cost-reducing plan to turn "a car company working with tech into a tech company working with cars" focused on brand enhancement, full adoption of EV technologies, and pivot towards new mobility habits. He picked the iconic Renault 5 to symbolize Renault's rebirth in the EV era, drove the consolidation of Renault's EV platform Ampere (CEO since June 2023), merged Renault Sport and Formula One Team into Renault's high-end brand Alpine, launched the EV microcar-sharing brand Mobilize (discontinued in 2025), and sealed a partnership with Chinese carmaker Geely to develop next-gen low-emission combustion technologies (Horse Powertrain). In 2023, he was appointed president of the European Automobile Manufacturers Association (ACEA), focusing his agenda on Europe's EV production capacity.

When he first joined Renault Group, the company was losing €8 billion. In 2022, it was announced that Renault Group started to witness a financial improvement and de Meo managed to turn around the company in 18 months. Accordingly, better financial results for 2021 were released, they included a 6% increase in revenues and a net profit approaching one billion (€967 million). By January 2023, in less than two years, de Meo completed the first phase of his transformation program. In 2023, de Meo's strategy was bringing about results as Renault's operating margin increased to 5.6% for the past year, compared to only 2.8% in 2021. Two and a half years later, de Meo managed to make the group witness a financial recovery. In the sports segment, Alpine grew by 33% in 2022. In June 2025, De Meo left his position as CEO of Renault Group.

De Meo's exit from Renault coincided with his appointment as CEO of Kering (Gucci, Yves Saint Laurent, Balenciaga, Bottega Veneta) effective September 2025, a crossover from the automotive to the luxury sector. He was hired to fix Kering's balance sheets with his signature transformation leadership. Immediate measures included an audit of the group's retail network in view of downsizing, reduce Kering's financial dependency on Gucci, and reduce the debt. He sold Kering's beauty division (including fragrance brand Creed) to L'Oréal for 4 billion euros, postponed the full acquisition of Valentino, and appointed Francesca Belletini CEO of Gucci.

== Other roles ==
- Teaching fellow at SDA Bocconi School of Management.

== Awards ==
- 2015: Commander of the Order of Merit of the Italian Republic
- 2017: Bocconi Alumnus of the Year
- 2019: Entrepreneur of the Year Medal of Honour by the Catalan Employers
- 2021: Grand Cross of the Order of Isabella the Catholic
- 2022: Cavaliere of the Order of Merit for Labour
- 2022: Knight of the French Legion of Honour
- 2025: Premio Laurentum

== Publications ==
- De Meo, Luca (2010). Da 0 a 500. Storie vissute, idee e consigli da uno dei manager più dinamici della nuova generazione [From 0 to 500: Lived Stories, Ideas and Advice from One of the Most Dynamic Managers of the New Generation] (in Italian). Marsilio.
- De Meo, Luca (2024). Dictionnaire amoureux de l'automobile [Dictionary of automotive love] (in French). Place des éditeurs.
- De Meo, Luca (2025). Dizionario sentimetale dell'automobile [Sentimental dictionary of automobile] (in Italian). Rizzoli.

== Filmography ==
- (fr) Anatomie d'un come-back (2024), prod. Breath Film, 4-episode miniserie on the 2020-2024 transformation of Renault

== Personal life ==
De Meo is married to Silvia Goracci and has two sons.
