= Nissan Ariya =

Battery electric compact crossover SUV

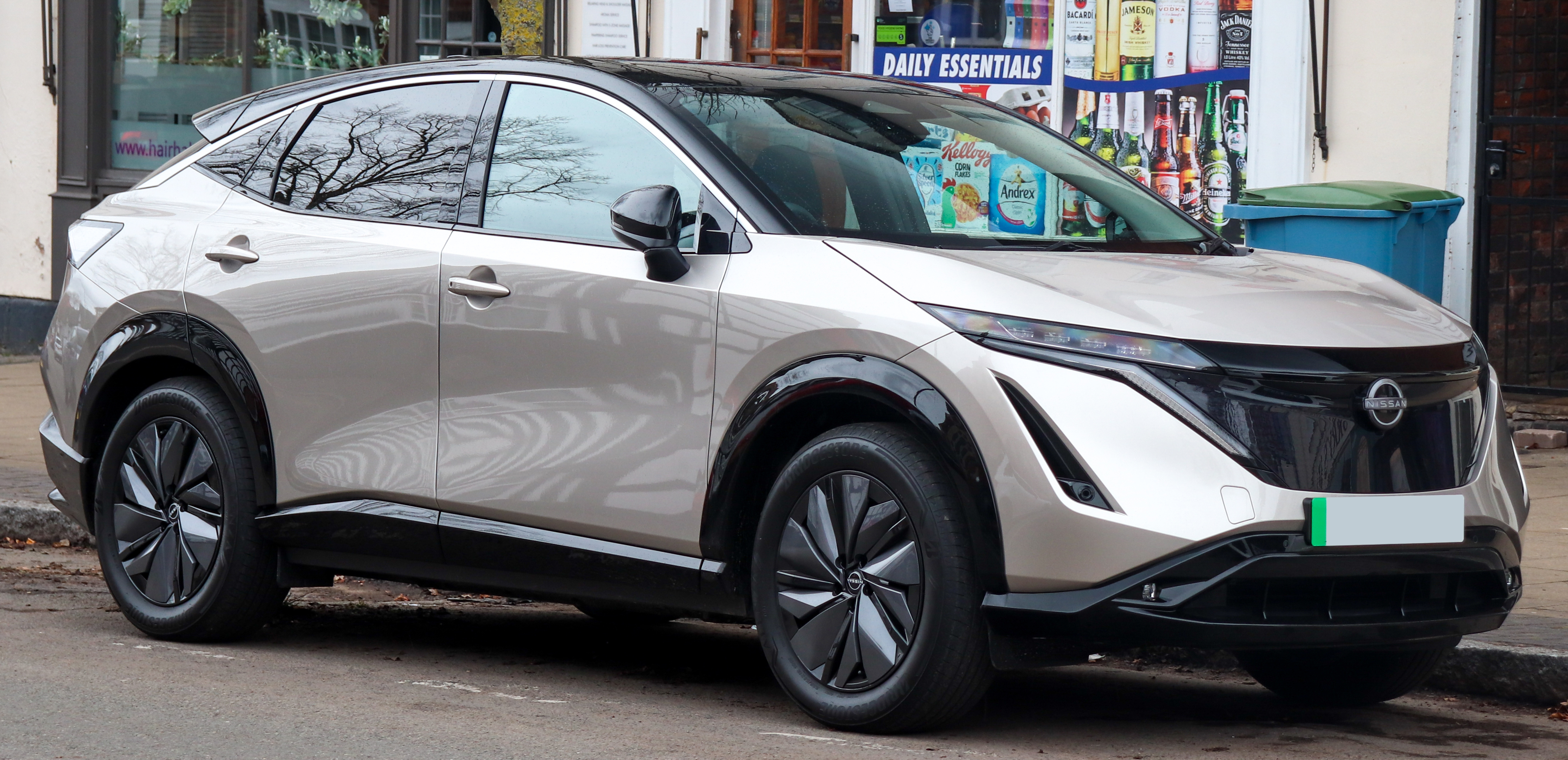
- 2022 Nissan Ariya (pre-facelift)

Overview
- Manufacturer: Nissan
- Model code: FE0
- Production: January 2022 – present
- Model years: 2023–2025 (US); 2023–present (Other markets)
- Assembly: Japan: Kaminokawa, Tochigi (Tochigi plant); China: Wuhan (Dongfeng Nissan)
- Designer: Takashi Utsunomiya and Kazuki Aoyama

Body and chassis
- Class: Compact crossover SUV
- Body style: 5-door SUV
- Layout: Front-motor, front-wheel-drive; Dual-motor, all-wheel-drive (e-4orce)
- Platform: AmpR Medium
- Related: Nissan Leaf (ZE2); Nissan Juke (F17)

Powertrain
- Electric motor: 3-phase AM67 AC synchronous motor
- Battery: 65, 90 kWh lithium ion
- Electric range: 65 kWh (230 MJ) 360 km (220 mi); 90 kWh (320 MJ) 500 km (310 mi)
- Plug-in charging: Onboard charger; Optional charger: Dual charger: DC Charging; Up to 130 kW

Dimensions
- Wheelbase: 2,775 mm (109.3 in)
- Length: 4,595 mm (180.9 in)
- Width: 1,850 mm (72.8 in)
- Height: 1,655–1,665 mm (65.2–65.6 in)
- Curb weight: 1,920–1,960 kg (4,233–4,321 lb)

The Nissan Ariya (Japanese: 日産・アリア) is a battery electric car produced by the Japanese company Nissan since January 2022. It is a compact crossover SUV and is produced at Nissan's factory in Tochigi prefecture. The Ariya is the brand's first zero-emissions SUV. It was first revealed in July 2020, with the US launch of the Ariya initially planned for the second half of 2021, before being delayed to 2022.

== Overview ==
The Ariya Concept was unveiled in 2019 Tokyo Motor Show. The design is a refinement of the Nissan IMx Concept that was showcased in 2017.

Originally slated to hit the market in 2021, the Ariya production version was unveiled in July 2020. Due to the chip shortage caused by the COVID-19 pandemic, the Ariya's launch was delayed to 2022 from its original 2021 launch.

In November 2021, pricing was revealed for the North American market. It was offered in four grades: Venture, Evolve+, Empower+, and Premiere. Deliveries began in the United States and Canada in late 2022 for the 2023 model year. The Platinum+ was added in May 2023 in the same model year.

The Ariya is available in both front-wheel drive and all-wheel drive (e-4orce) variants and with a 63 kWh or 87 kWh battery size. The 63 kWh battery is only available on the Engage base trim. Standard technology on the Ariya includes Nissan's Safety Shield 360 system, which includes the ProPilot driver assist system. The more advanced ProPilot 2.0 system, which allows hands-free driving under certain conditions is available on some trims.

The Ariya was launched in November 2024 for New Zealand, and in September 2025 for Australia. Three variants are available in those countries: Engage, Advance, and Evolve.

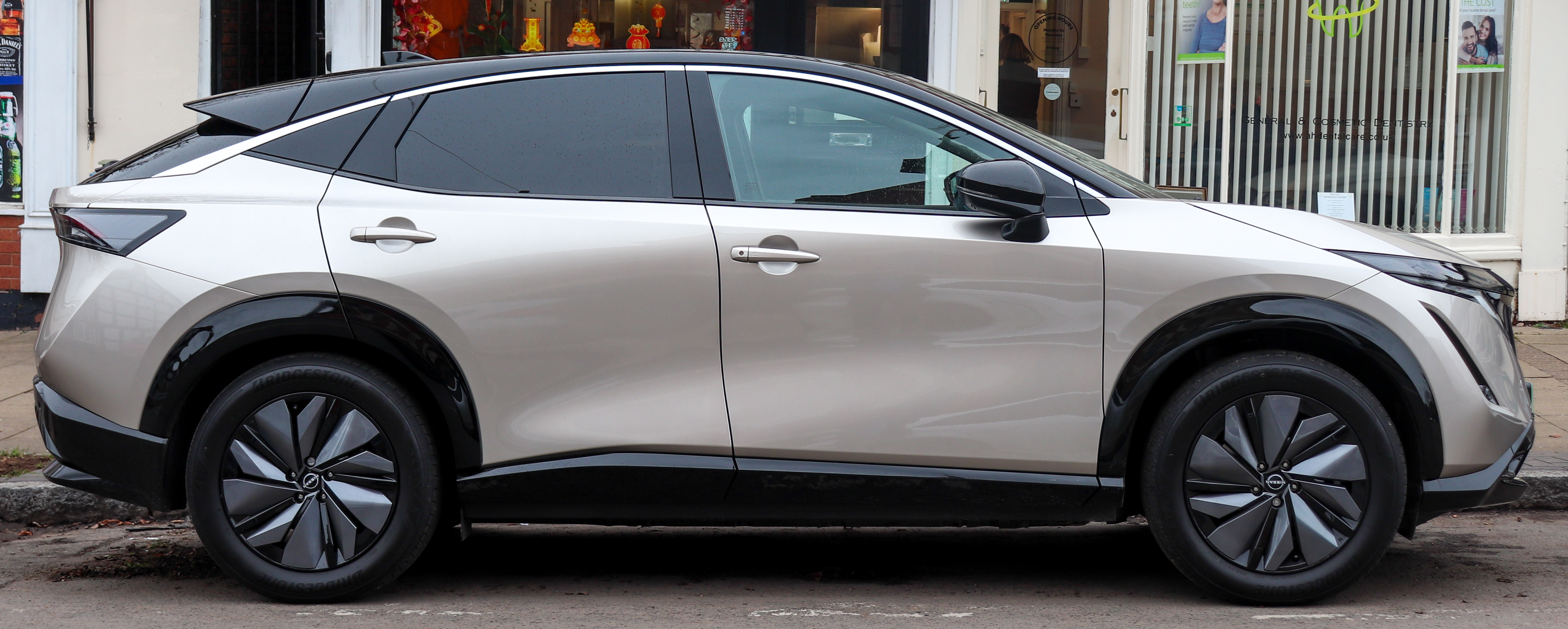
Side view

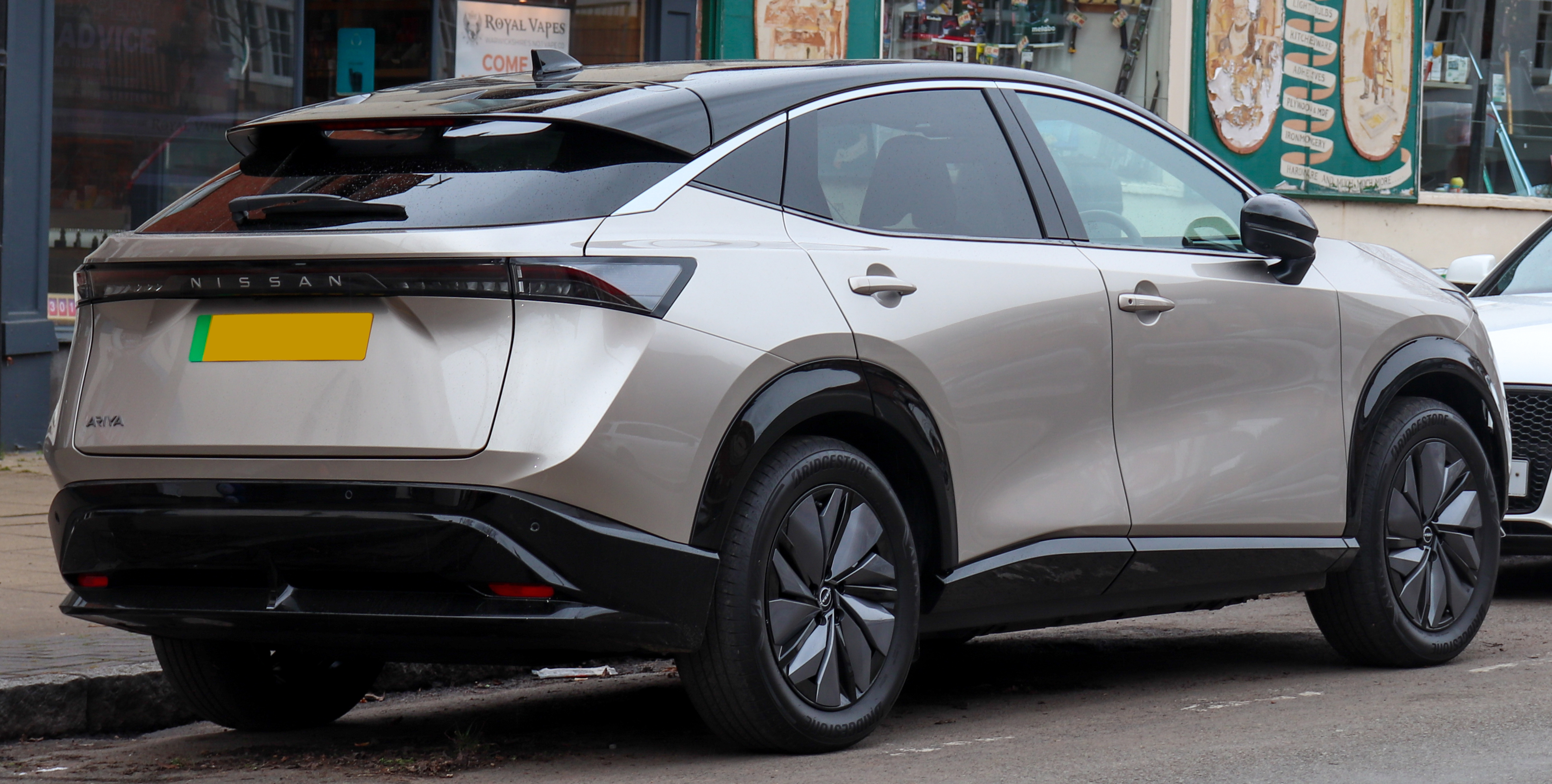
Rear view

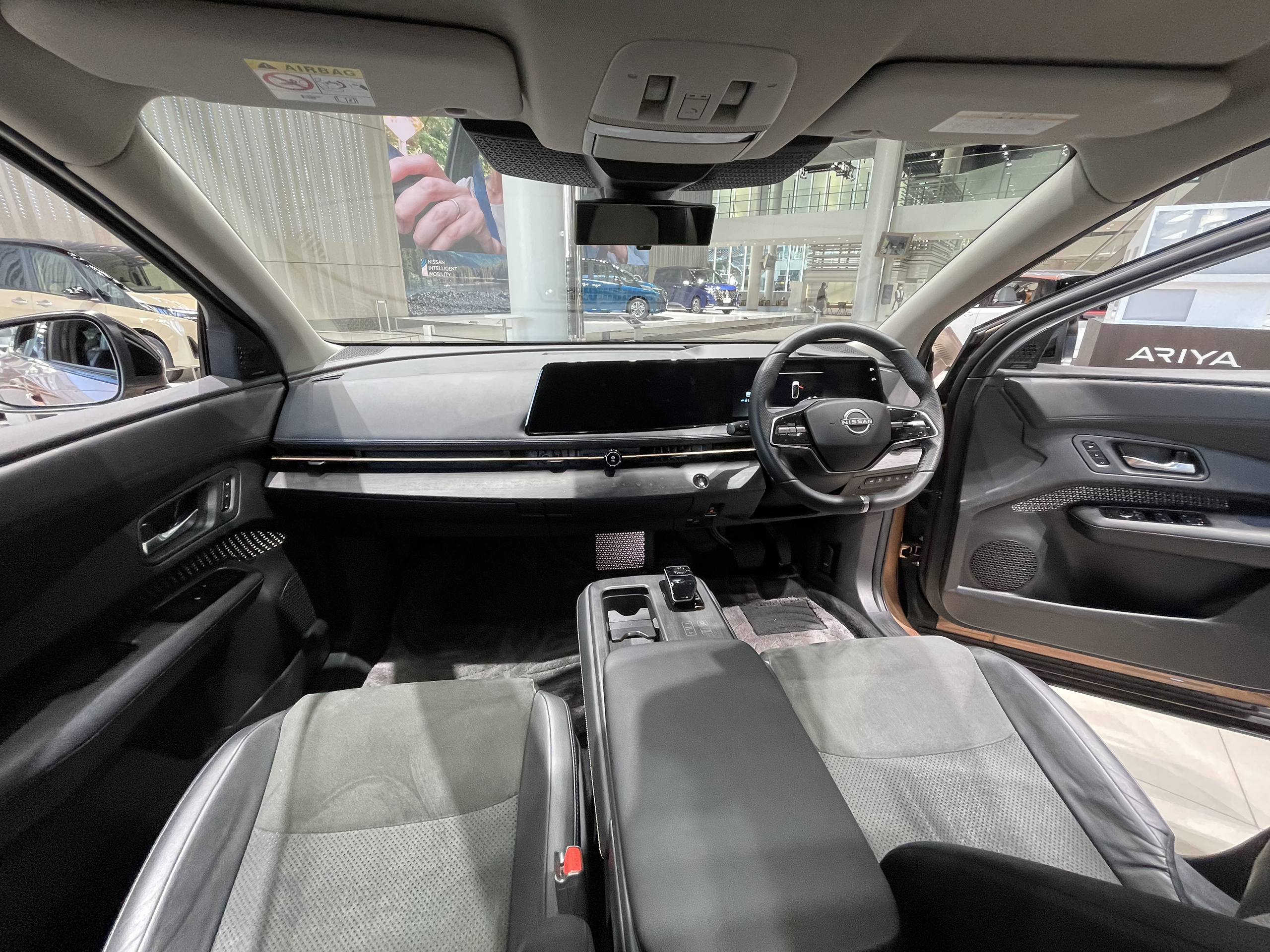
Interior

=== Nismo ===
The Ariya Nismo was introduced on 12 January 2024 at 2024 Tokyo Auto Salon. For Japanese-market, the Ariya Nismo was offered in two grade: B9 e-4ORCE with a battery capacity of 91kWh and a maximum output of 320 kW (435 PS; 429 hp), and the B6 e-4ORCE with a battery capacity of 66kWh and a maximum output of 270 kW (367 PS; 362 hp). In Japan, e-4ORCE is standard for Ariya Nismo models.

As with other Nismo models, The Ariya Nismo get slightly changed front and rear bumpers with front splitter, side skirts, a rear spoiler on the tailgate, and Nismo red pinstripes.

The Ariya Nismo was launched in Europe in July 2024, marked the revival of the NISMO brand in the European market since the 370z Nismo was discontinued in late 2019.

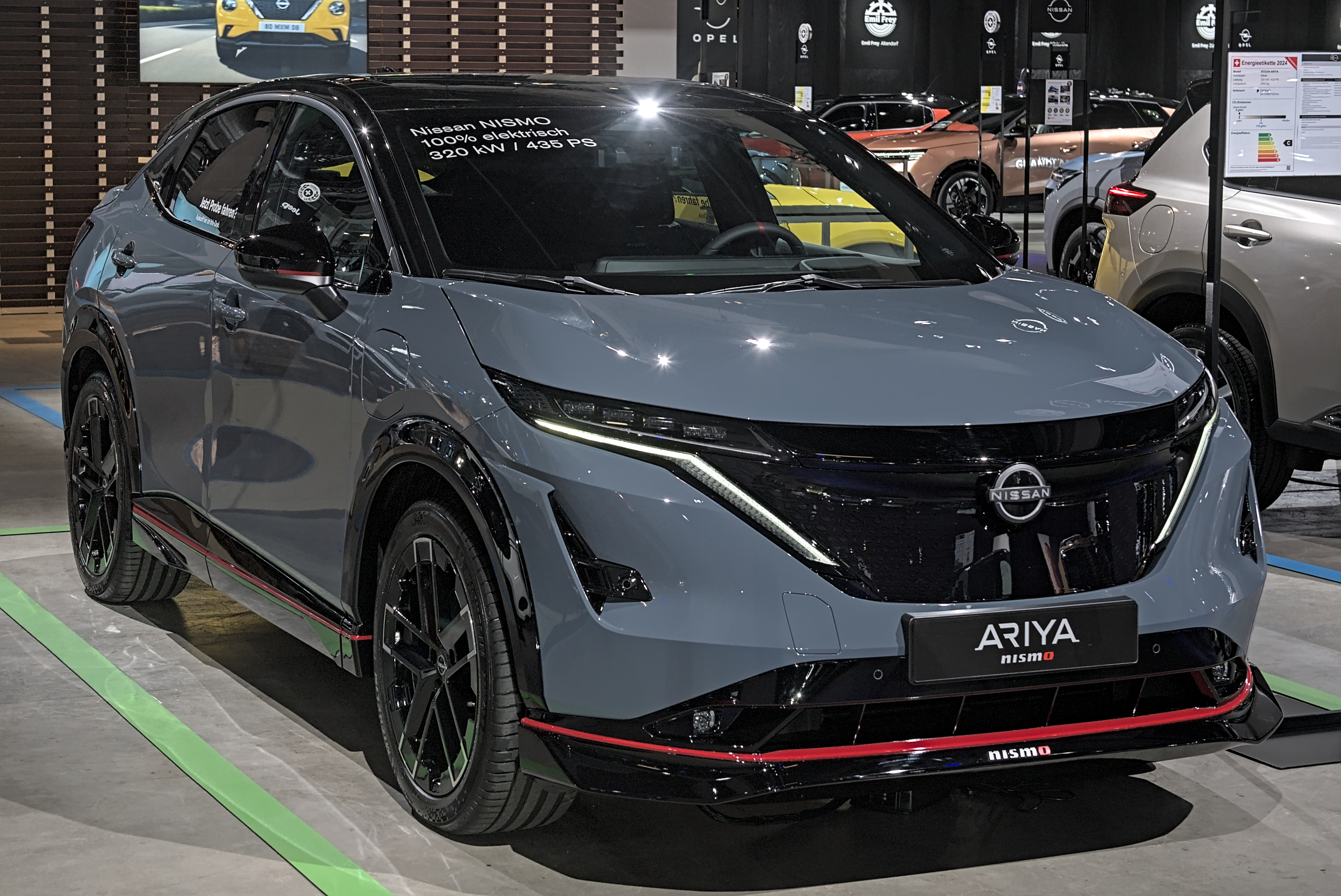
Ariya Nismo (front)

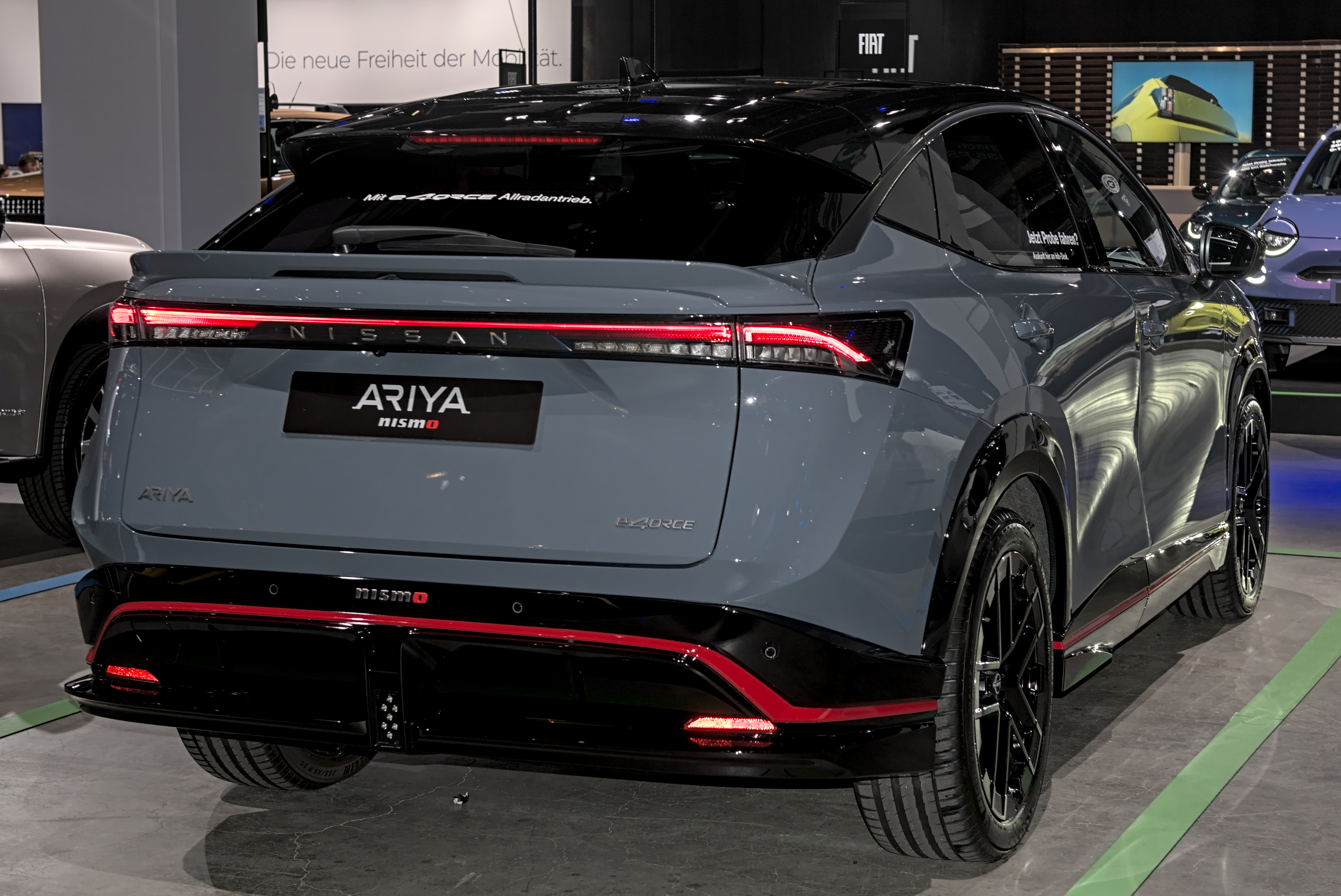
Ariya Nismo (rear)

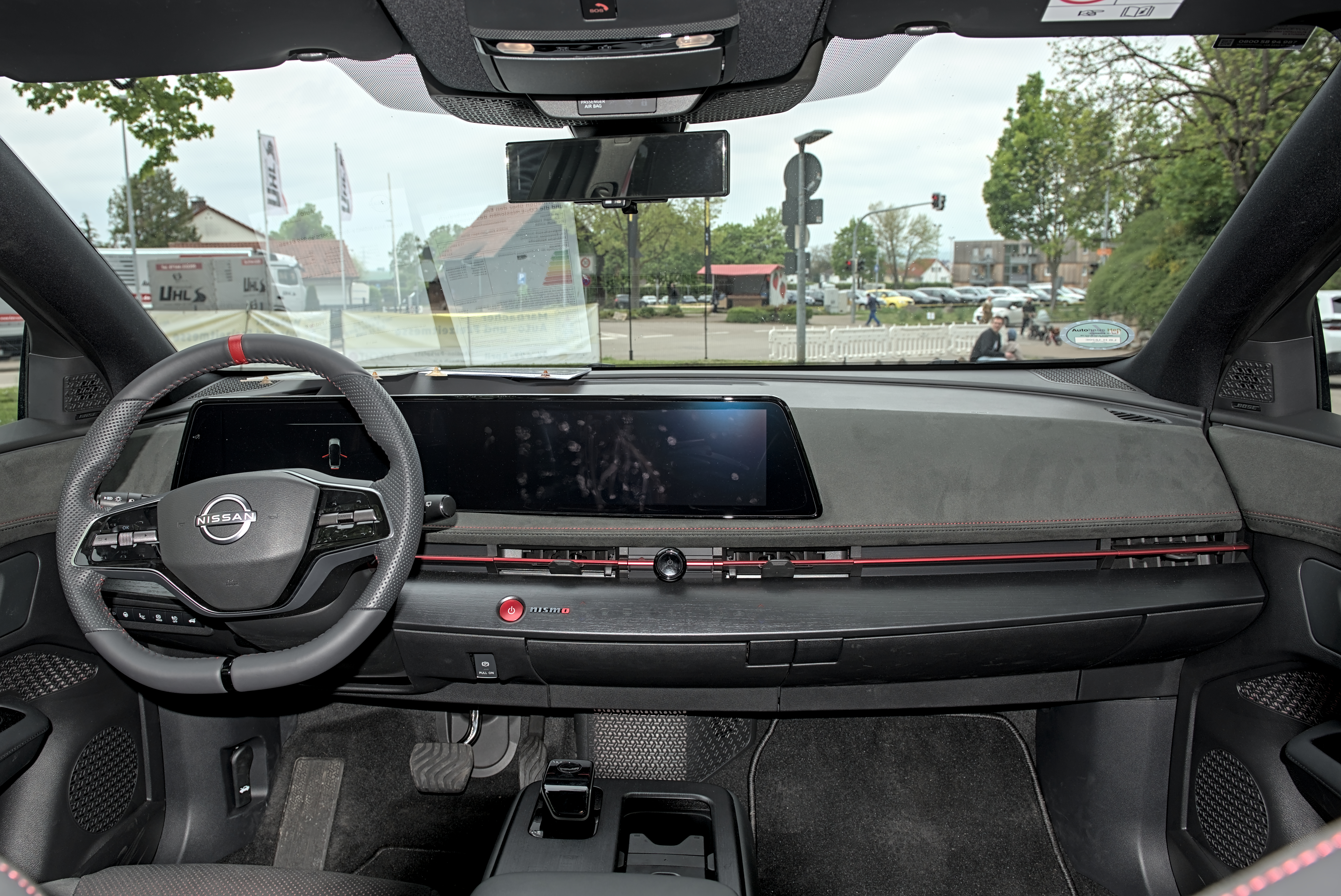
Interior

=== Facelift (2026) ===
The facelifted Ariya for the 2026 model year was previewed in October 2025, debuted at the Japan Mobility Show the following month, and unveiled in Japan on December 23, 2025. The front end of the Ariya now features a grille-less design and headlights inspired by the third-generation Leaf. The fog lights were also removed. A new Google-powered infotainment system is also to be used for the facelift.

The United States did not receive the facelifted Ariya due to tariffs.

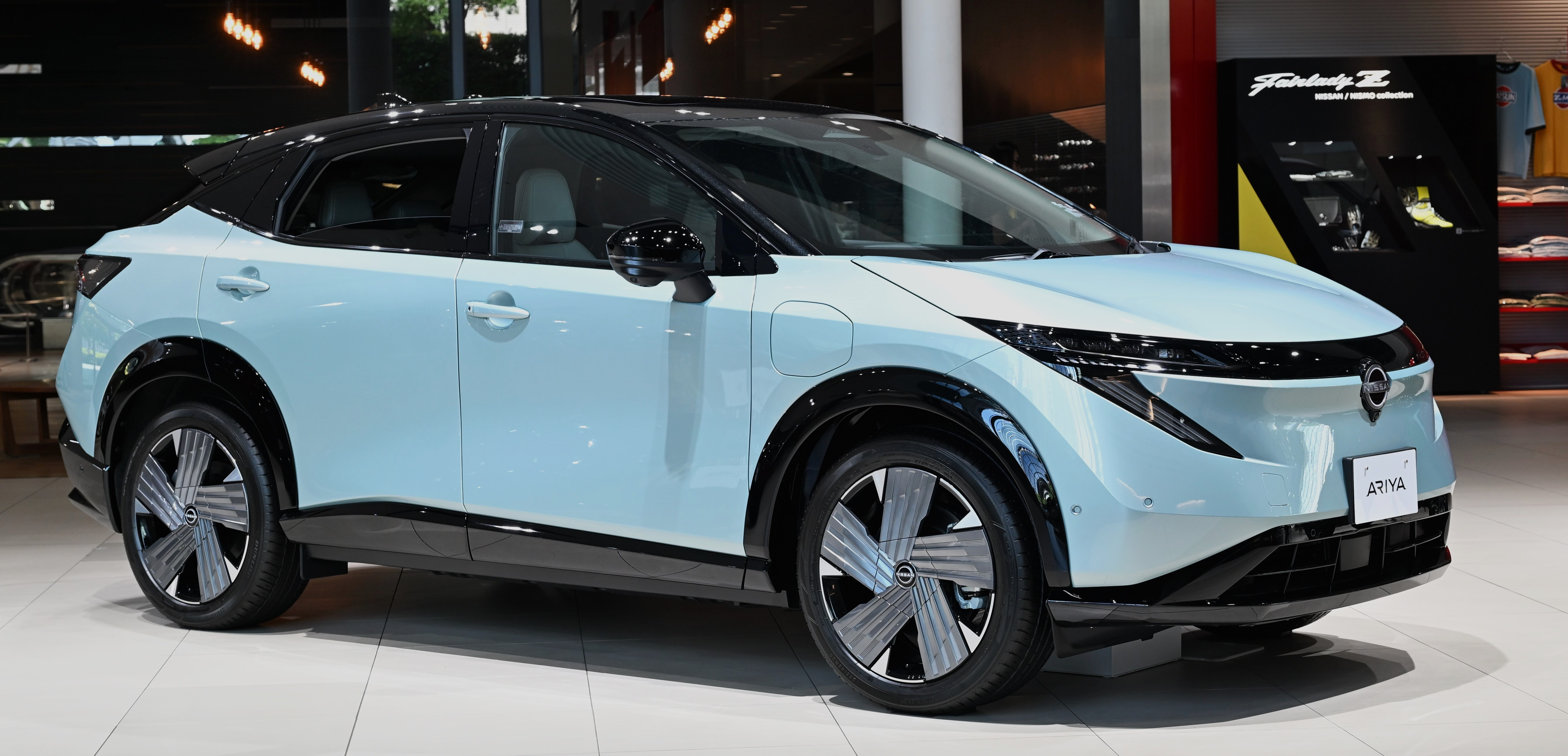
2026 Ariya (facelift)

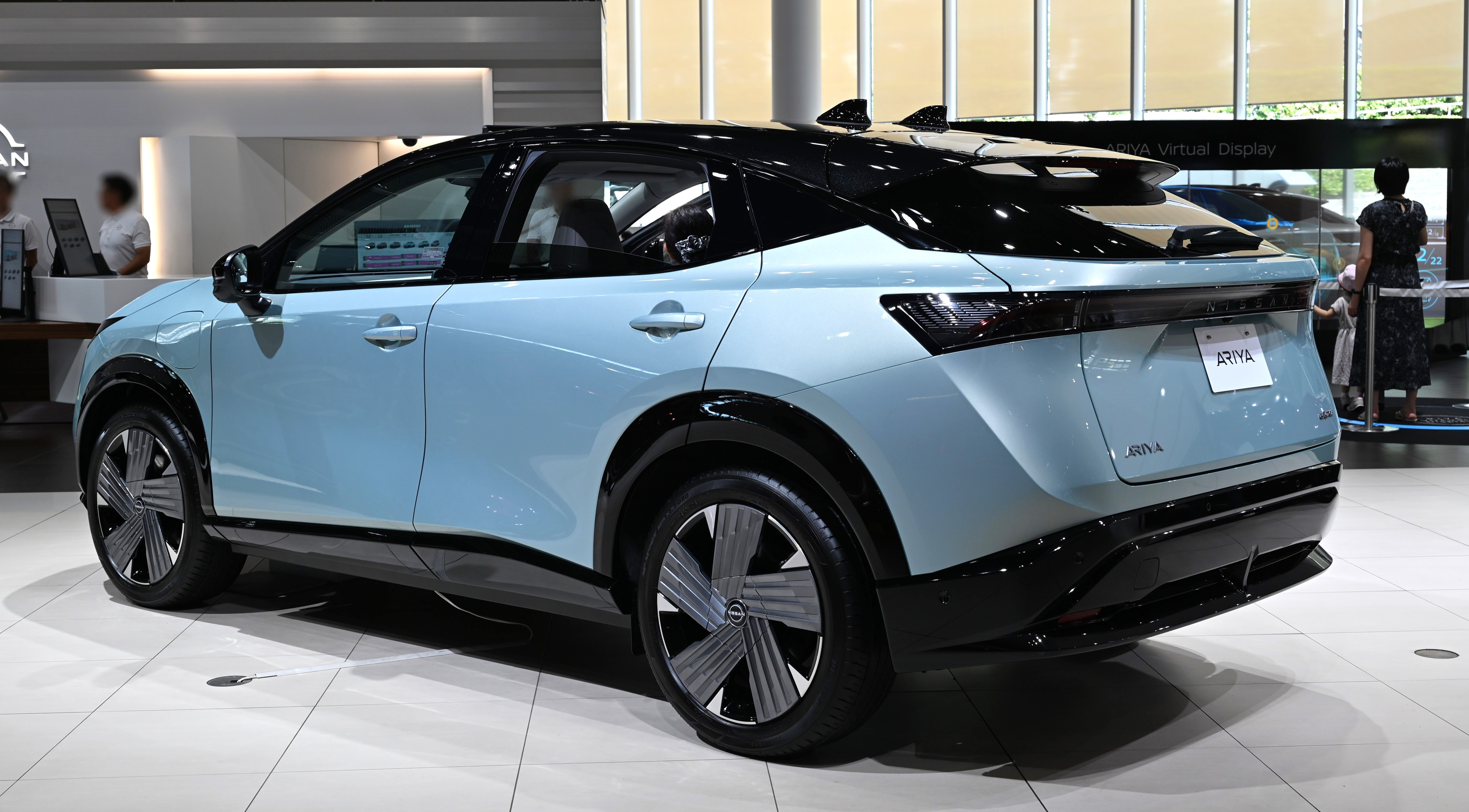
2026 Ariya (facelift)

== Safety ==
Euro NCAP test results Nissan Ariya (160kW) (LHD) (2022)
Test	Points	%
Overall:	5 /5 stars	
Adult occupant:	33	86%
Child occupant:	43.9	89%
Pedestrian:	40.4	74%
Safety assist:	15	93%

C-NCAP (2021) test results Nissan Ariya 2WD Long Range
Category		%
Overall:	5 /5 stars	86.3%
Occupant protection:		89.20%
Vulnerable road users:		77.97%
Active safety:		84.40%

ANCAP test results Nissan Ariya (2022, aligned with Euro NCAP)
Test	Points	%
Overall:	5 /5 stars	
Adult occupant:	32.97	86%
Child occupant:	43.86	89%
Pedestrian:	40.38	74%
Safety assist:	15.23	95%

=== IIHS ===
The 2023 Ariya was awarded "Top Safety Pick" by IIHS, which applies to vehicles built after March 2023, when Nissan made adjustments to the headlights and all trims comes equipped with LED projector headlights.

IIHS scores (2023)
Small overlap front (driver)	Good		
Small overlap front (passenger)	Good		
Moderate overlap front (original test)	Good		
Side (updated test)	Good		
Headlights	Acceptable	Marginal	
Front crash prevention vehicle-to-pedestrian (Day)	Superior		Optional system
Front crash prevention vehicle-to-pedestrian (Day)	Superior		Standard system
Front crash prevention vehicle-to-pedestrian (Night)	Superior		Standard system
Front crash prevention vehicle-to-pedestrian (Night)	Advanced		Optional system
Seatbelt reminders	Acceptable		
Child seat anchors (LATCH) ease of use	Good+		

* Applies to units built before April 2023.

== Specification ==
Specifications
Model	Standard range		Extended range		
Powertrain	FWD	AWD	FWD	AWD	AWD performance
Availability	2022–				
Battery capacity (usable)	66 kWh (63 kWh)		91 kWh (87 kWh)		
Range (WLTP)	360 kilometres (224 mi)	340 kilometres (211 mi)	500 kilometres (311 mi)	460 kilometres (286 mi)	400 kilometres (249 mi)
Power	160 kW (218 PS; 215 hp)	205 kW (279 PS; 275 hp)	178 kW (242 PS; 239 hp)	225 kW (306 PS; 302 hp)	290 kW (394 PS; 389 hp)
Torque	300 N⋅m (221 lb⋅ft)	560 N⋅m (413 lb⋅ft)	300 N⋅m (221 lb⋅ft)	600 N⋅m (443 lb⋅ft)	
Acceleration 0–60 mph (0–97 km/h)	7.5 s	5.9 s	7.6 s	5.7 s	4.8 s
Top speed	160 km/h (99 mph)	200 km/h (124 mph)	160 km/h (99 mph)	200 km/h (124 mph)	
DC fast charge (DCFC) speed	Up to 130 kW				
On-board charge speed	7.4 kW (with 22 kW as standard in different countries)				
Trunk space	468 L (17 cu ft)	415 L (15 cu ft)	468 L (17 cu ft)	415 L (15 cu ft)	

== Concept cars ==
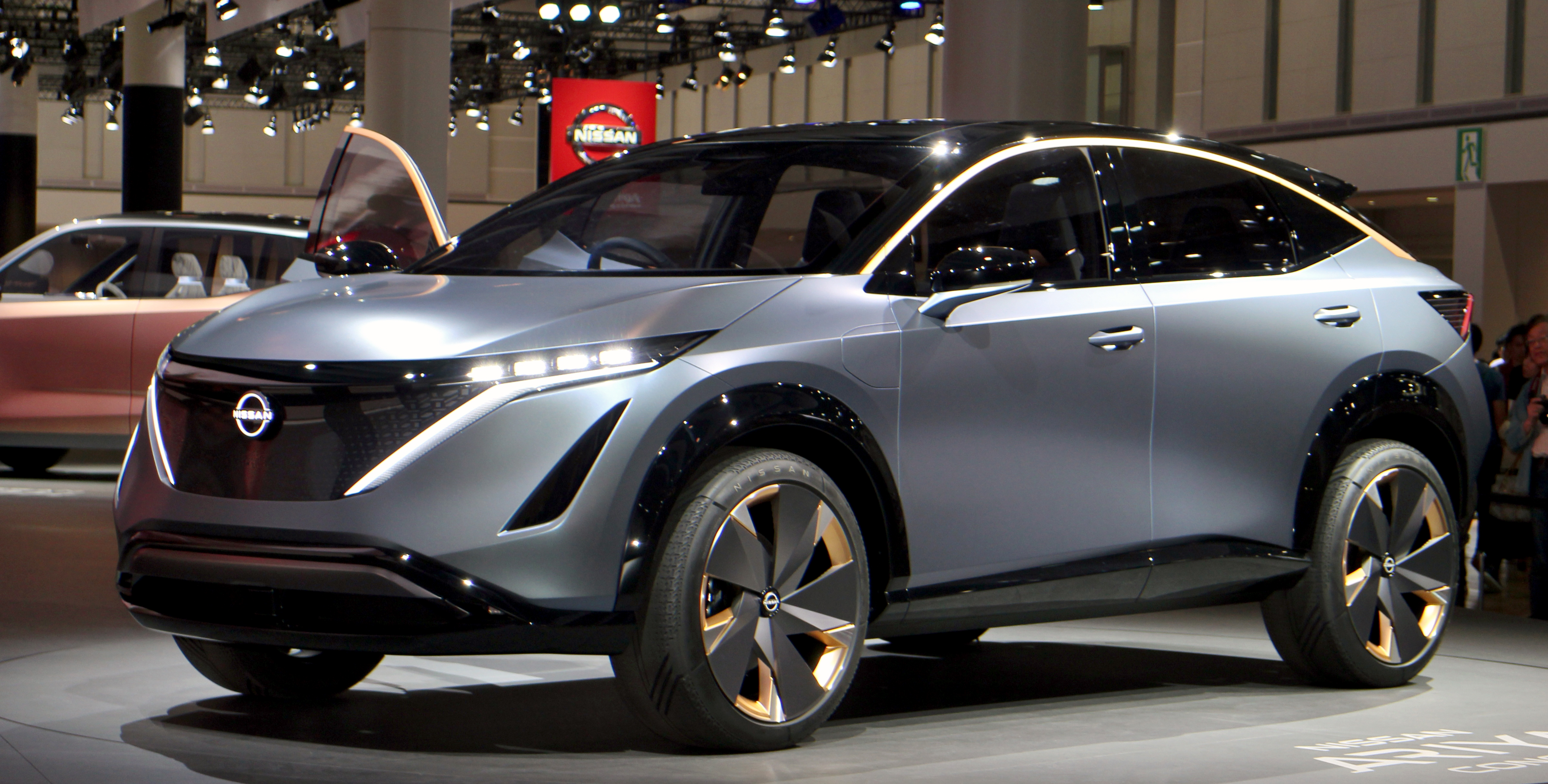
Ariya concept (front)

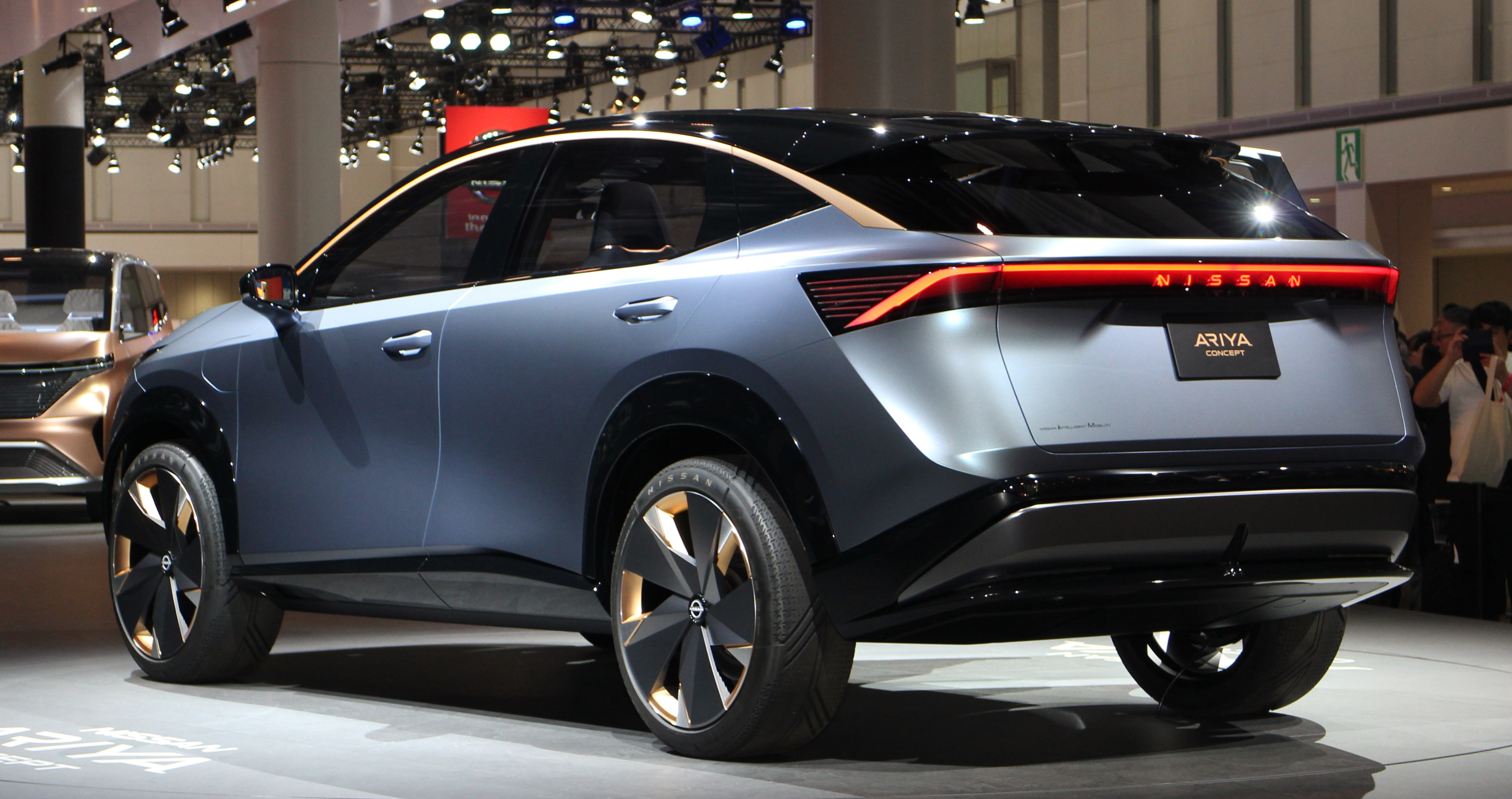
Ariya Concept (rear)

The Nissan Ariya concept car was presented on October 24, 2019 at the 2019 Tokyo Motor Show. It was a 100% electric coupe SUV concept car measuring 4.6 m (15 ft) in length. The concept car was fitted with 21-inch rims, LED headlamps and an illuminated logo on its grille, which itself forming a large "V" characteristic of Nissan design. Inside, the dashboard was equipped with two 12.3-inch screens assembled to form a large screen, from which ProPilot 2.0, the second generation of Nissan's driver assistance system, is controlled. Nissan did not release information on the capacity of the battery to be used in the production Ariya, but indicated that it woulde be recharged by direct current (DC) compatible with standard CHAdeMO. Target acceleration from 0 to 60 mph (0 to 97 km/h) was 5.1 seconds. The Ariya was stated then to support the CCS standard in the US and European markets.

=== Ariya Single Seater ===
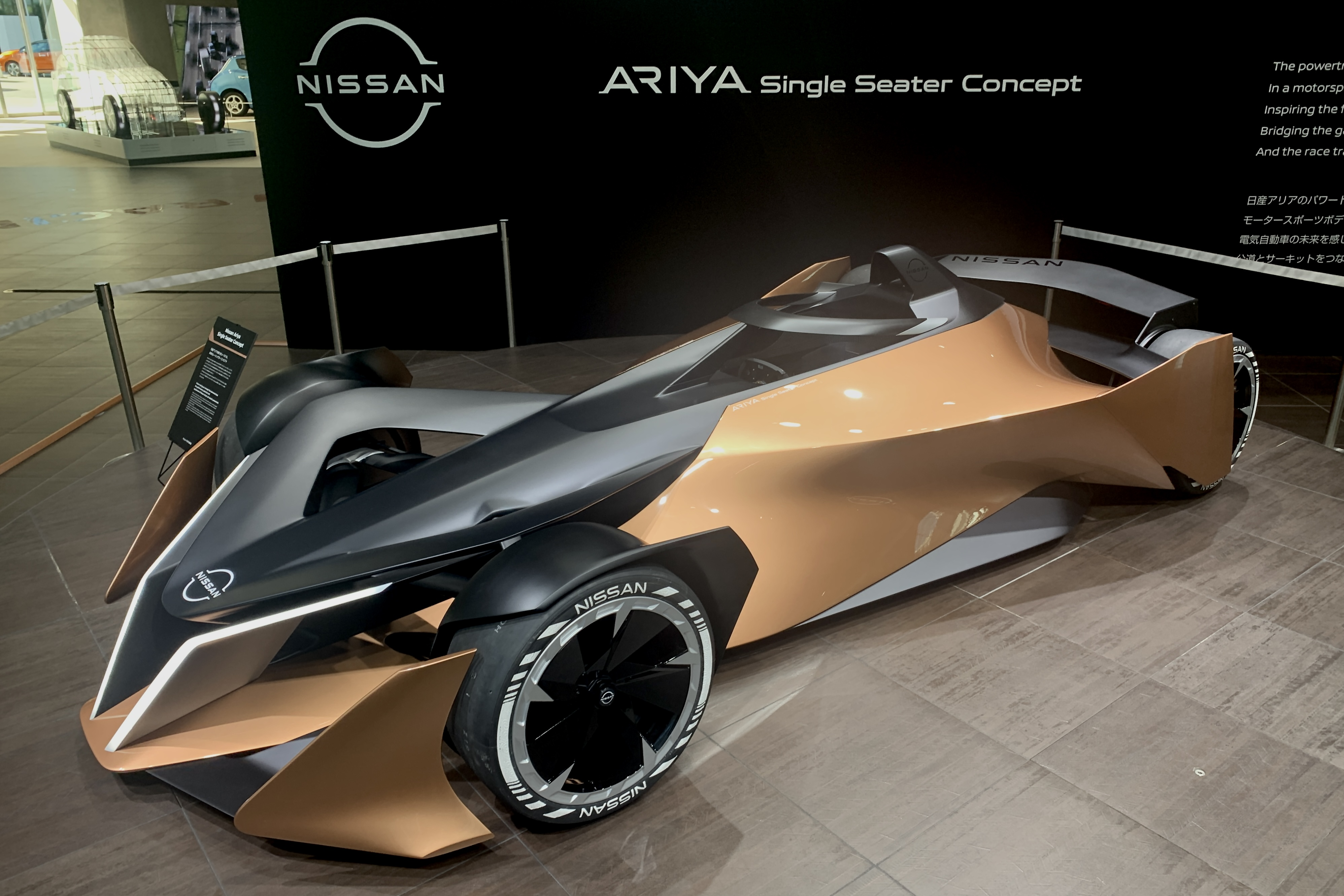
Ariya Single Seater Concept

The Ariya Single Seater Concept was unveiled in December 2021, as part of Nissan's Futures event. The concept car, which is a demonstration of an all-electric motorsports vehicle similar to ones used in Formula E racing, shares its powertrain with the Ariya SUV. The concept also shares multiple design cues with its SUV counterpart, including the illuminated "V" shape at its front and its overall form, which, according to Nissan, "looks like it was shaped by the air itself". Tommaso Volpe, Nissan global motorsports director, stated that the Ariya Single Seater Concept would be "a powerful demonstration of just how thrilling electric vehicles could be."

== Sales ==
Year	Japan	Europe	U.S.	Canada	China	Norway
2021	3					
2022	3,285	4,631	201	1	1,205	536
2023	7,634	11,364	13,464	1,810	3,702	2,606
2024	2,612	17,920	19,798	3,964	2,114	3,772
2025	1,347	16,090	14,906	2,059	54	
