= Renault 5 E-Tech =

Battery electric hatchback

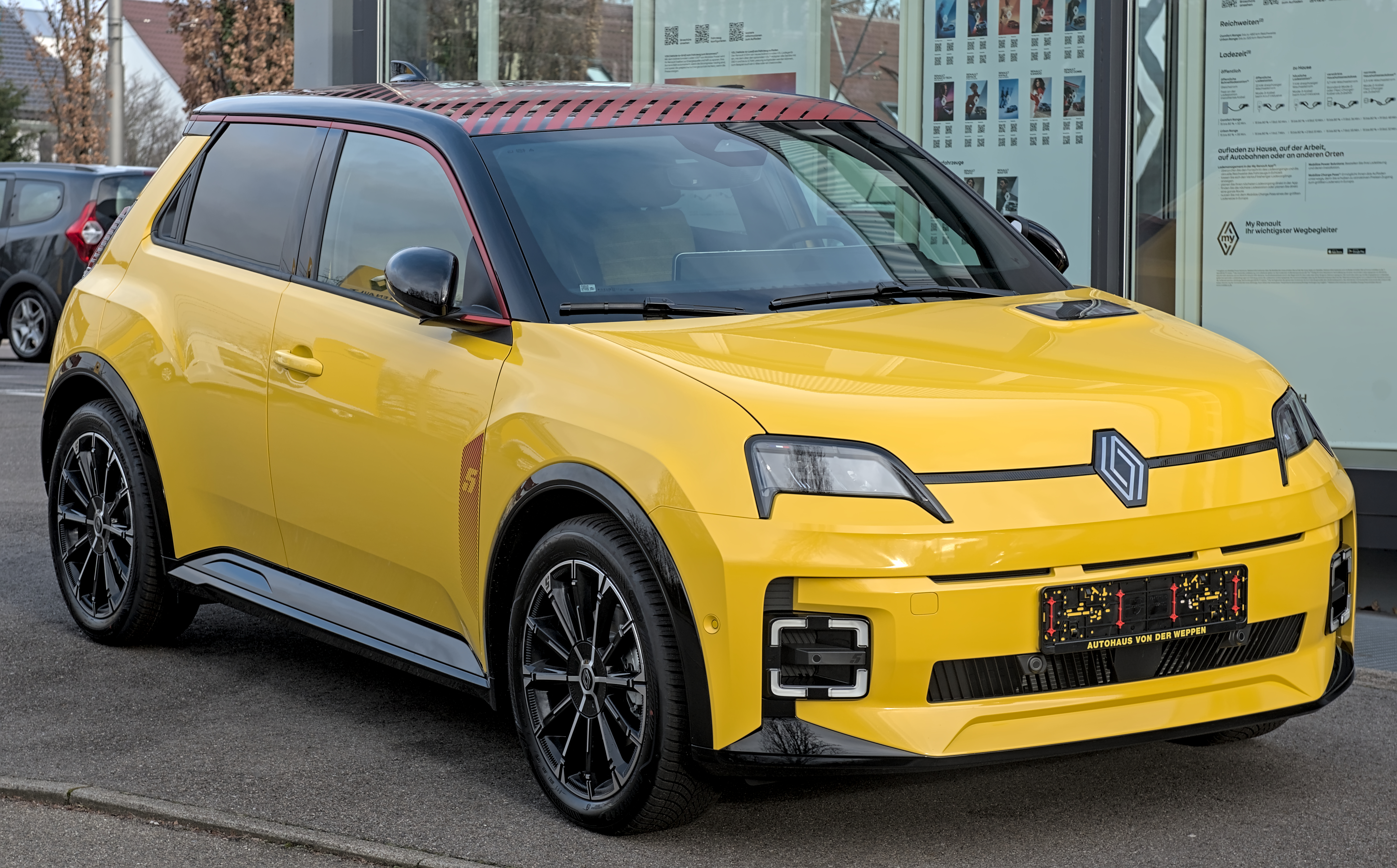
- 2025 Renault 5 E-Tech Electric

Overview
- Manufacturer: Renault
- Model code: R5E
- Also called: Alpine A290
- Production: 2024–present
- Assembly: France: Douai (Renault ElectriCity)
- Designer: Gilles Vidal

Body and chassis
- Class: Supermini (B)
- Body style: 5-door hatchback
- Layout: Front-motor, front-wheel-drive; Dual rear-motor, rear-wheel-drive (5 Turbo 3E)
- Platform: AmpR Small; CMF-EV 800-volt architecture (5 Turbo 3E)
- Related: Renault 4 E-Tech; Nissan Micra EV; Renault Twingo E-Tech; Renault Zoe

Powertrain
- Electric motor: 70, 90, 110 kW externally-excited synchronous motor (EESM) 6AK; 2×200 kW (5 Turbo 3E)
- Power output: 70–110 kW (94–148 hp; 95–150 PS); 373 kW (500 hp; 507 PS) (5 Turbo 3E)
- Battery: 40 kWh NMC; 52 kWh NMC; 70 kWh NMC (5 Turbo 3E)

Dimensions
- Wheelbase: 2,540 mm (100.0 in)
- Length: 3,922 mm (154.4 in)
- Width: 1,774 mm (69.8 in)
- Height: 1,498 mm (59.0 in)
- Kerb weight: 1,350–1,450 kg (2,976–3,197 lb)

Chronology
- Predecessor: Renault Zoe

The Renault 5 E-Tech is a B-segment battery electric car produced by the French manufacturer Renault since 2024. Inspired by the original Renault 5 in styling, the 5 E-Tech was previewed by a concept car shown in January 2021, with the production model being officially unveiled at the Geneva International Motor Show in February 2024.

== History ==
=== Development ===
Development of the Renault 5 E-Tech began from an orange life-size design mockup that was presented to Renault CEO Luca de Meo at the Renault Technocentre in Guyancourt in July 2020. The mockup was merely an exploratory study by a designer, François Leboine for a small electric car that was rejected as the company was not looking to produce a retro car. The mockup caught the attention of De Meo, who asked the design team to turn it into a prototype car. By October 2020, the prototype was completed. The prototype was showcased as the Renault 5 Prototype, and became a symbol of Renault's electric car strategy called Renaulution, which was announced on 14 January 2021.

In his short memoir about the Renault 5, De Meo emphasized the need of having at least one model that "express their DNA more than any of the others", citing the Fiat 500, Volkswagen Golf, Mercedes-Benz S-Class and Renault Twingo as examples. De Meo personally oversaw the development and organized intense critical discussions that led to some design changes, with an employee calling the car the "boss's car" that they "couldn’t afford to make mistakes".

Renault had to drastically reduce the normal development time for the Renault 5 from four years to three years, which it achieved by using the CMF-B platform as the base. Around 1,100 parts was used to build the vehicle, many of which are shared with other CMF-B vehicles such as the Clio V. The platform is also used by the Renault 4 and Nissan Micra.

In October 2022, Renault unveiled its "industrial metaverse" at the Flins plant in Yvelines, which is being transformed to become the Re-Factory. Among the technologies on display was a simulation of a virtual reality paint booth, with the vehicle rendered in 3D for the demonstration being the production version of the Renault 5 EV, the first time it has been shown without camouflage.

In March 2023, journalists had the opportunity to test a development mule of the production version, scheduled for a release in 2024. 'Vehicle check' prototypes, using near-final bodies and chassis, were tested starting in July 2023. These prototypes also serve to test the production processes. Prior development prototypes used Clio bodies on the CMF-BEV platform.

=== Concept car ===
An electric Renault 5 was announced in January 2021 as part of Groupe Renault's strategic plan "Renaulution" covering the period 2021–2025+; the Renault marque has branded their effort "Nouvelle Vague" (New Wave), with the goal of offering the most complete electrified and hydrogen fuel cell lineup by 2025.

The R5 prototype uses a small battery electric variant of the Renault–Nissan Common Module Family platform, initially designated CMF–B EV and later named AmpR Small. CMF–B EV will be used in additional forthcoming small cars, including an electric version of a revived Renault 4. Renault initially denied the 5 EV would replace the Zoe, but later reversed their stance. Standardization of the platform and battery technology is expected to reduce production costs by 33% compared to the Zoe, as many components are reused from the CMF-B platform used in the Clio V.

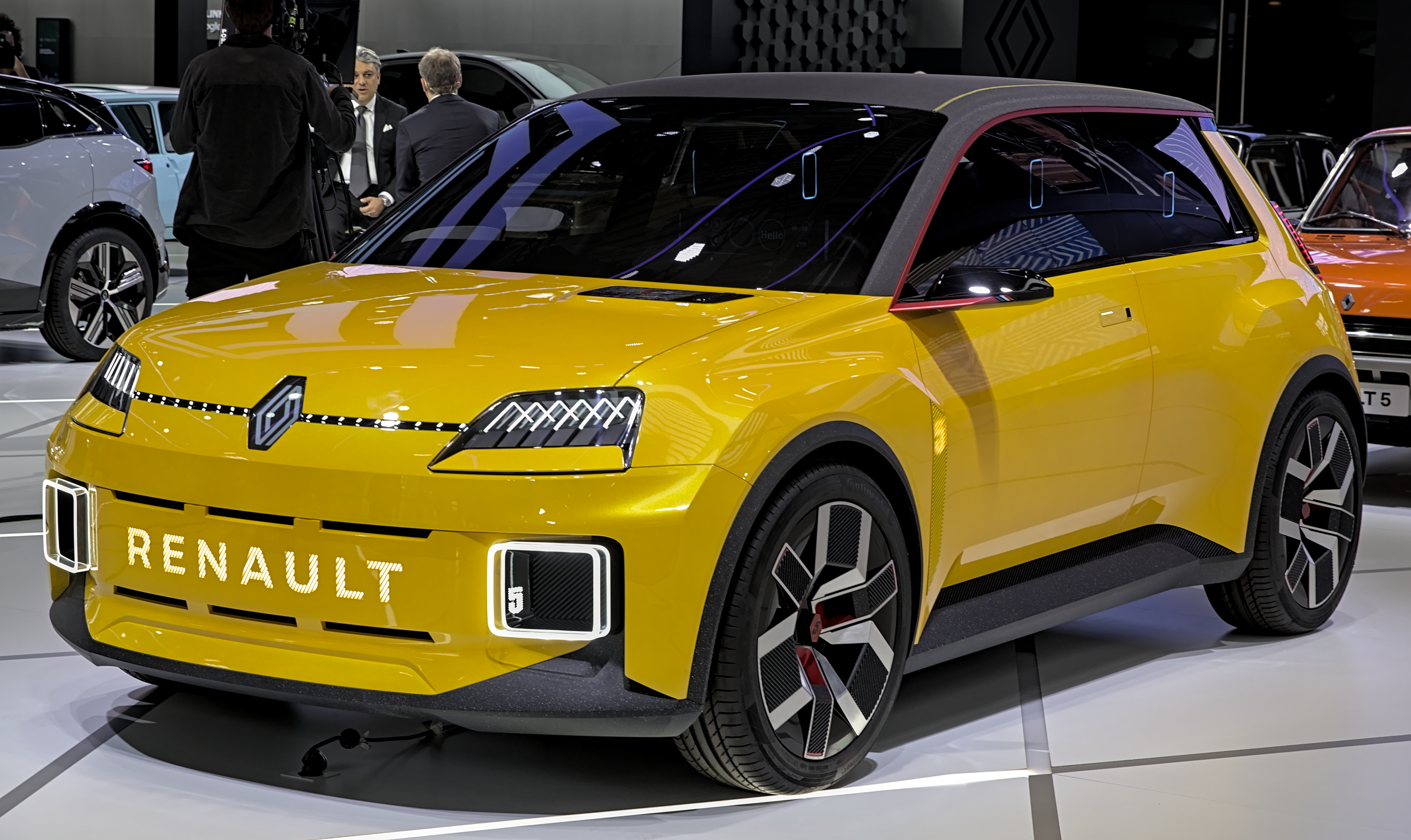
Prototype at IAA 2021 (front)

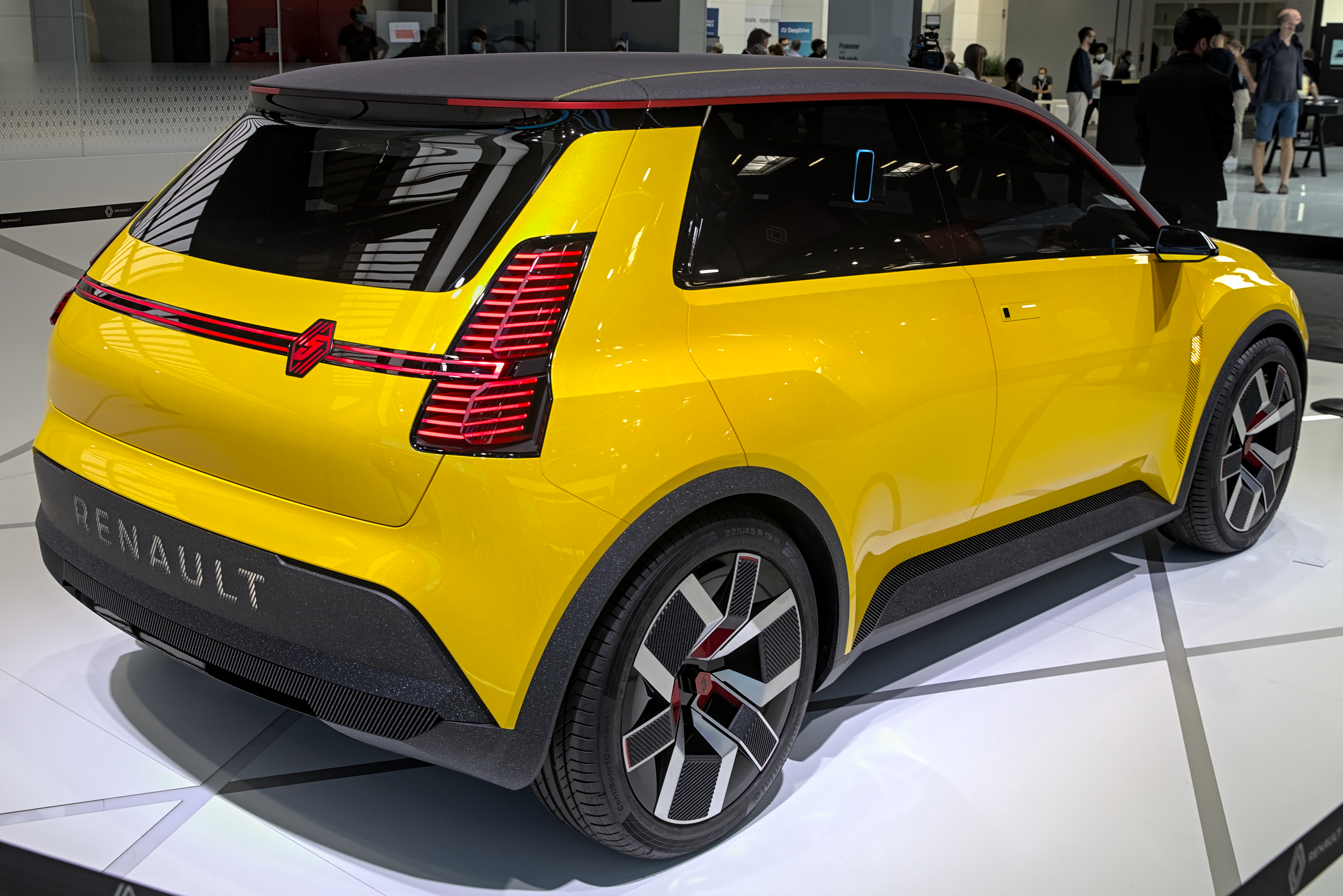
Prototype at IAA 2021 (rear)

=== 2026 update ===
In December 2025, Renault announced that the Renault 5 E-Tech would gain new features from late January 2026, including a one-pedal driving mode on Techno and higher trims and a driver attention alert function. On the Renault 5 E-Tech Electric, the OpenR system consists of a 10.1-inch digital instrument cluster and a 10-inch central touchscreen arranged horizontally.

On 25th August 2026 Renault announced pre-orders for an updated 2026 model to ship in a few weeks. This model switches from NMC batteries to LFP batteries, comes with more powerful motors, increased range, a Fast charge 80kW DC charger, additional colours and more.

== Styling ==
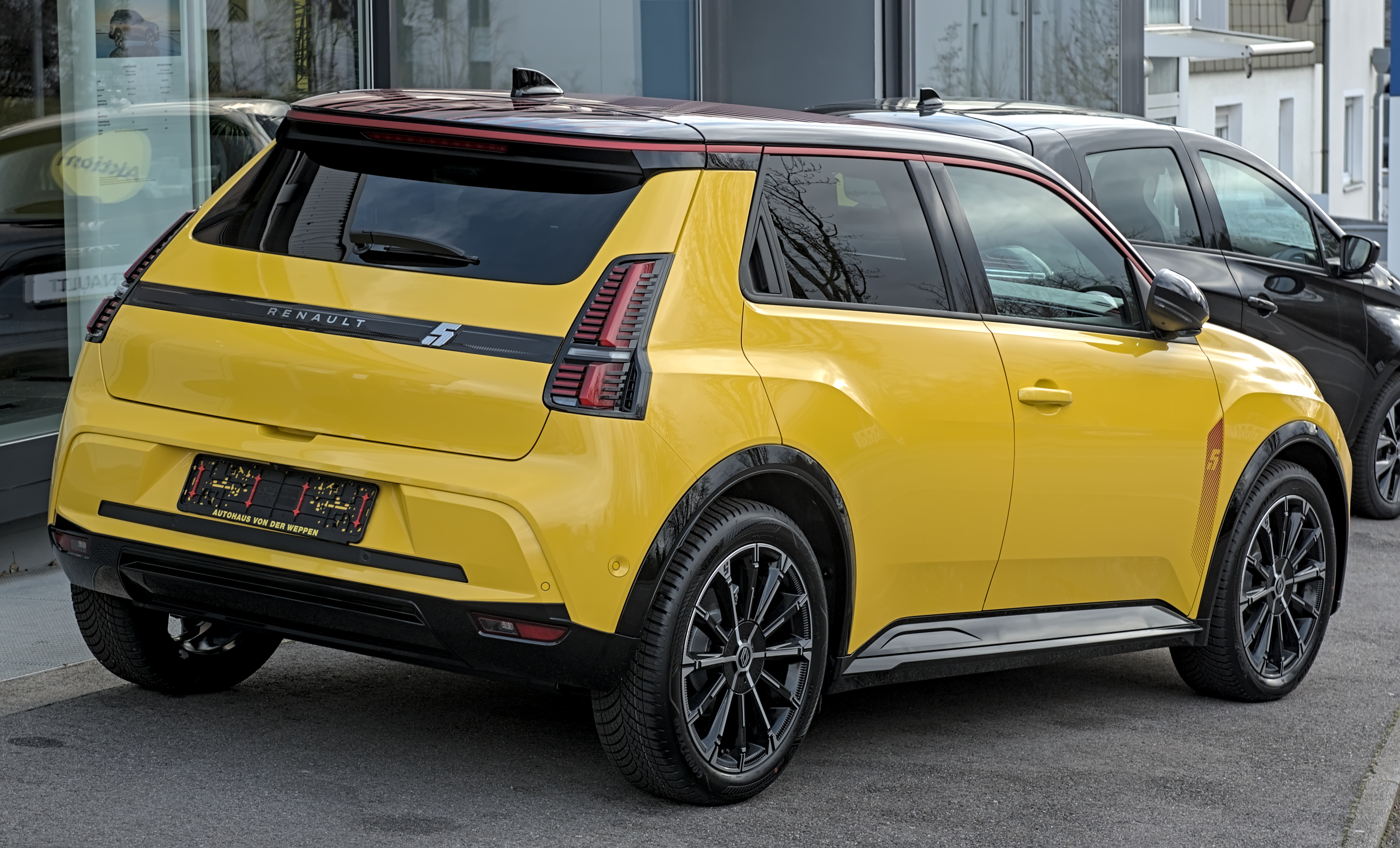
Rear view

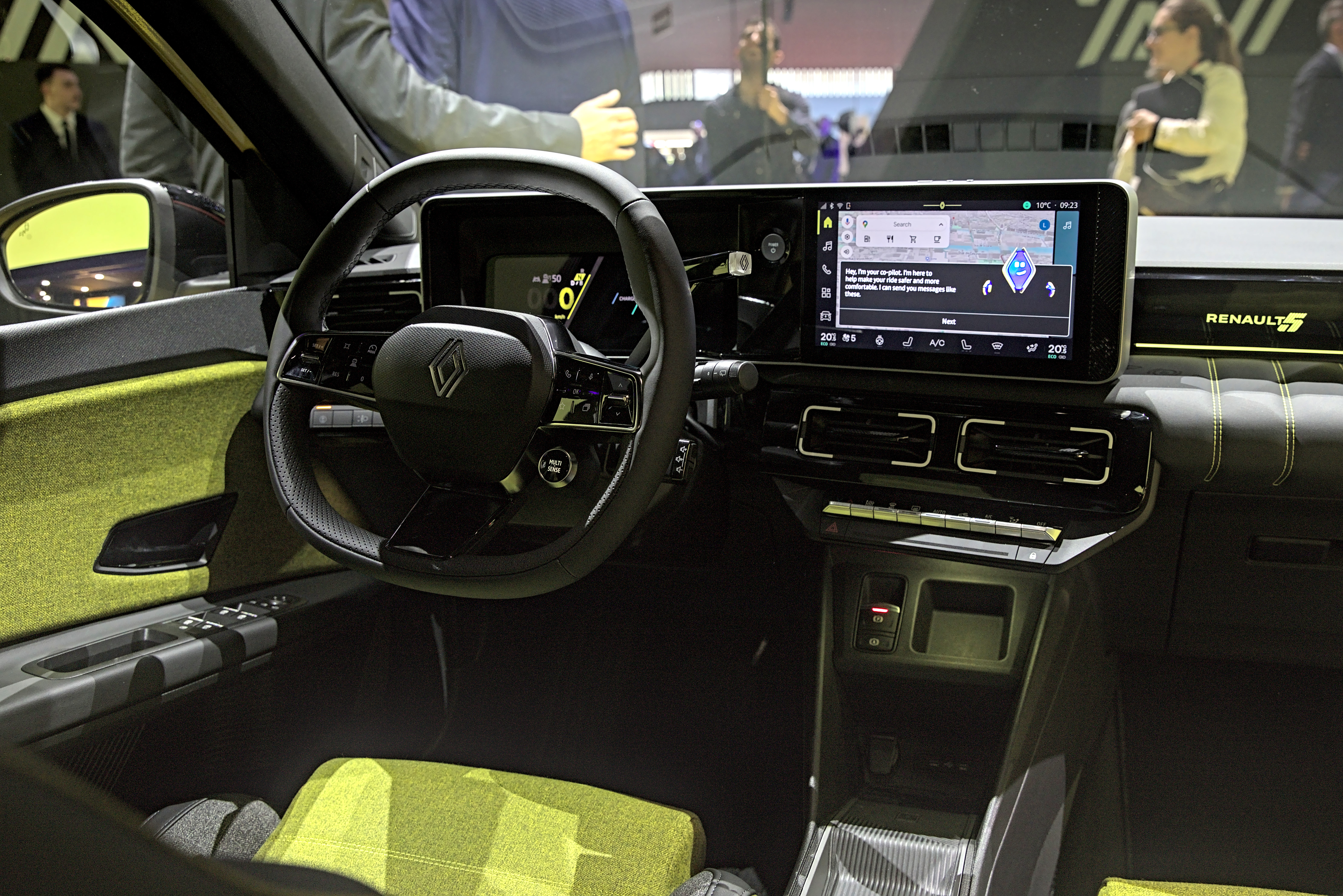
Interior

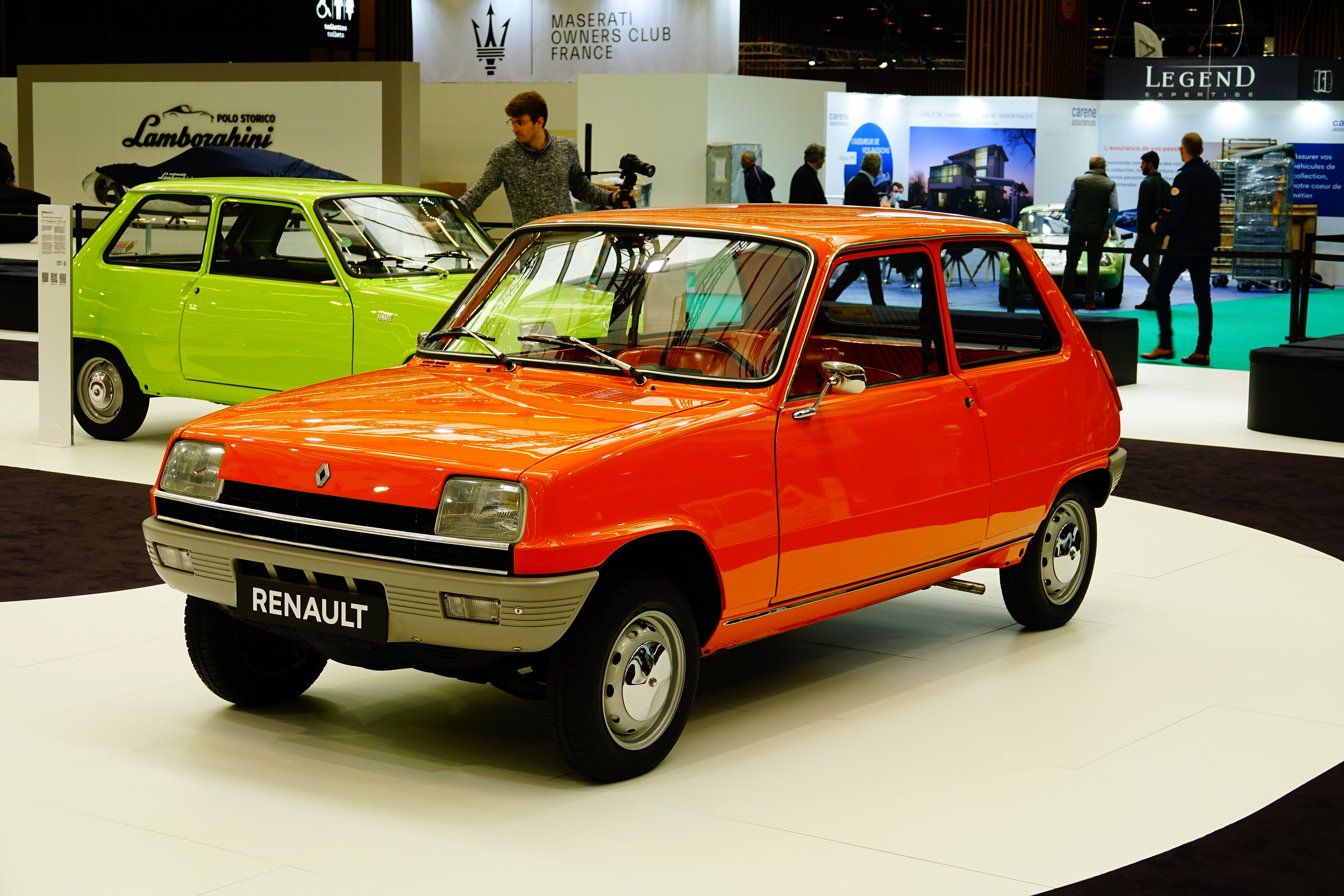
Renault 5, photographed in 2022 for the 50th anniversary celebration

Styling was performed by a team under the leadership of Gilles Vidal. It was inspired by the Mark I Renault 5 model, with updates influenced by contemporary consumer electronics, furniture and sports products. Vidal joined Renault in November 2020, after the design of the R5 Prototype was already under way. The double-diamond Renault logo, which was designed by Victor Vasarely and his son Jean-Pierre (aka Yvaral) and debuted with the original R5 in 1972, was illuminated and updated for the R5 EV prototype. Work on the new logo predated the car, under a contract awarded to Landor & Fitch in 2019. The revised logo is scheduled to be deployed across the Renault range by 2020.

The initial design was sketched by François Leboine; when Luca de Meo joined the company in July 2020 from Fiat, where he had overseen the launch of the Fiat 500 (2007), de Meo saw the possibilities of a revived R5. The exterior of the R5 Prototype was designed by Nicolas Jardin. Although the R5 Prototype is a five-door hatch, the rear door handles are hidden, to be reminiscent of the original R5 of 1972 which was available as a three-door hatch and as a five-door from 1979.

== Powertrain ==
According to Renault Executive Vice President for Engineering Gilles le Borgne, the Renault 5 EV is expected to be priced starting from €20–25,000; options will include one of two battery packs (40 kWh or 52 kWh), with an expected range of 400 km (250 mi) using the latter. The battery is expected to use NMC chemistry. Variants with the 40 kWh battery are available with 70 kW (94 hp; 95 PS) or 90 kW (121 hp; 122 PS) motors, while the 52 kWh battery is paired with a 110 kW (148 hp; 150 PS) motor. DC fast charging will be an added-cost option, and should match the maximum rate (130 kW) of the Renault Mégane E-Tech. The charging port is mounted on the bonnet, behind a door just in front of the driver on the left-hand side designed to resemble the air intake on the original R5.

== Manufacturing ==
The Renault 5 E-Tech will be produced at Renault ElectriCity, formed from the Douai, Maubeuge, and Ruitz factories in northern France; assembly will occur at Douai, using components built at Ruitz and a motor from Cléon. The pre-production prototypes of the R5 were built in the Technocentre facility near Paris that imitates the manufacturing process of the regular factories. Over 60 units of the R5 had been built for testing and validation purposes before large-scale production commenced.

== Sales ==
Renault 5 E-Tech had very successful sales start – it became one of the best selling EVs in Europe and lifted Renault's sales. The vast majority of Renault 5 buyers have not owned a Renault in the past. By December 2025, the 100,000th unit had been manufactured at the Ampere ElectriCity plant in Douai, France.

=== Production ===
==== Renault 5 ====
Year	Production
2023	<344
2024	25,379
2025	87,522

==== Alpine A290 ====
Year	Production
2024	6
2025	9,608

== Safety ==
Euro NCAP test results Renault 5 E-Tech electric techno comfort (LHD) (2024)
Test	Points	%
Overall:	4 /5 stars	
Adult occupant:	32.3	80%
Child occupant:	39.5	80%
Pedestrian:	48.2	76%
Safety assist:	12.4	68%

== Reception ==
The Renault 5 E-Tech generally received positive reviews from automotive publications, particularly for its performance, driving dynamics, styling and high quality materials. It was very positively reviewed in relation to alternatives and competing car models. Criticism was mostly directed at cramped back seats and limited rear storage. Overall, reception was positive with many publications giving it coveted awards like "editor’s choice", "best small car", "car of the year".

== Awards ==
The Renault 5 E-Tech is a highly acclaimed car and the Renault model with the most accolades. As of December 2025, it has received a total of 44 international automotive awards. It won European Car of the Year, Irish Car of the Year, Swiss Car of the Year and numerous other international awards. Renault 5 was selected as Car of the Year by Top Gear, AutoTrader, WhatCar and many other motoring publications.

== Alpine A290 (A5E) ==
Alpine A290
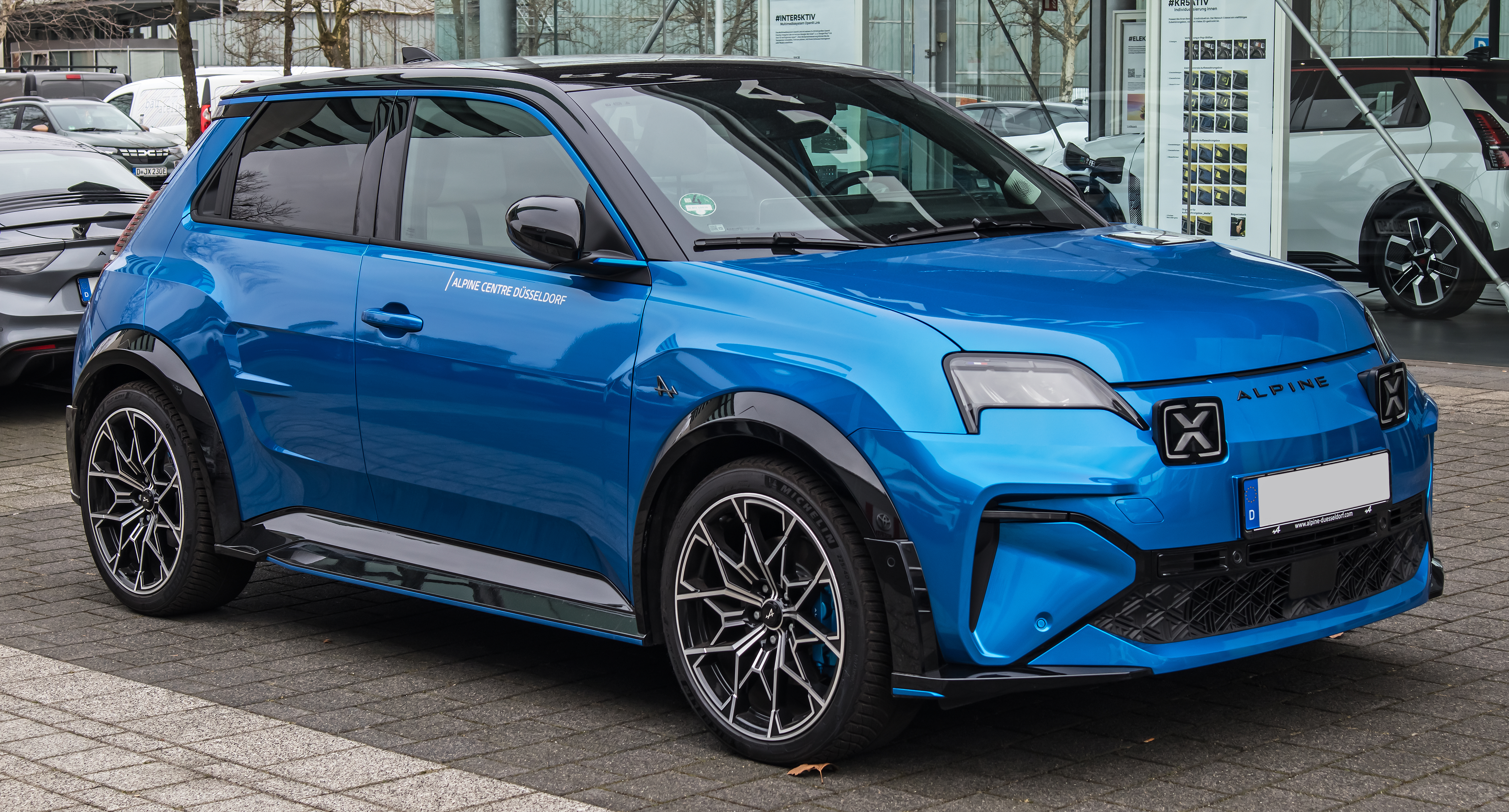
- Alpine A290 GTS

Overview
- Manufacturer: Alpine
- Model code: A5E
- Production: 2024–present
- Assembly: France: Douai (Renault ElectriCity)
- Designer: Raphaël Linari

Body and chassis
- Class: Supermini (B)
- Body style: 5-door hatchback
- Layout: Front-motor, front-wheel-drive
- Platform: AmpR Small

Powertrain
- Electric motor: 130, 160 kW externally-excited synchronous motor (EESM) 6AM
- Power output: 130–160 kW (174–215 hp; 177–218 PS)
- Battery: 52 kWh NMC

Dimensions
- Wheelbase: 2,530 mm (99.6 in)
- Length: 3,990 mm (157.1 in)
- Width: 1,820 mm (71.7 in)
- Height: 1,520 mm (59.8 in)
- Kerb weight: 1,479 kg (3,261 lb)

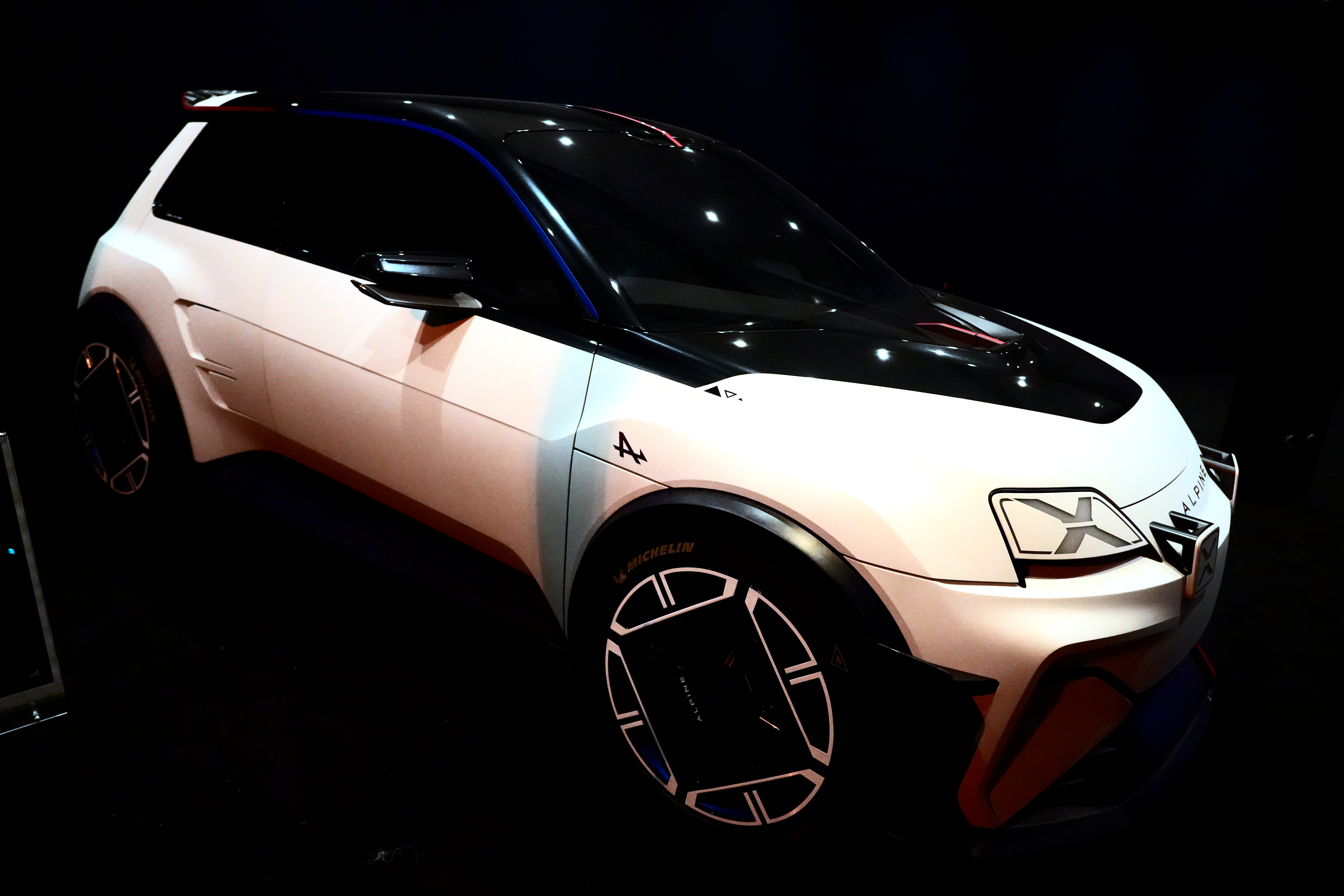
Alpine A290_β Concept (2023)

An Alpine-branded high-performance variant uses the more powerful traction motor from the Mégane E-Tech, which is rated at 160 kW (210 hp). The Alpine variant retains the front-motor, front-wheel drive layout of the Renault 5 E-Tech, but the track is wider for a sportier look.

On 9 May 2023, Alpine unveiled the A290_β, a concept car that previews the production model. However, before the official debut, two photos of the model were accidentally leaked online.

The production A290 was unveiled on June 13, 2024, before the 24 Hours of Le Mans. The design is identical to the concept. The base GT Premium is powered by a 130 kW (180 hp) electric motor, while the more powerful GTS has a 160 kW (220 hp) electric motor from the Mégane E-Tech that accelerates to 100 km/h (62 mph) in 6.4 seconds. The battery has a capacity of 52 kWh and a range of 380 km (236 mi).

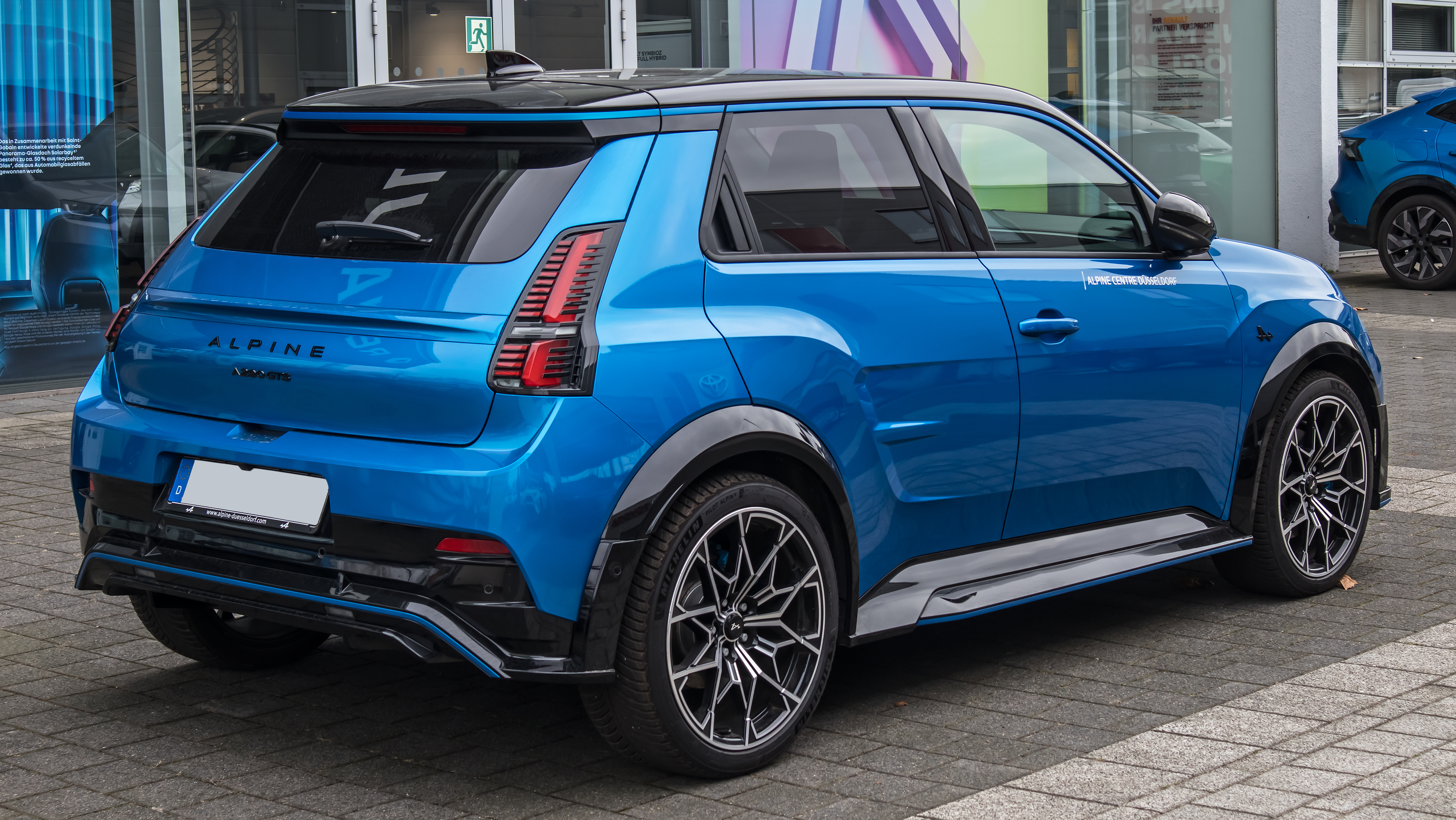
Rear view

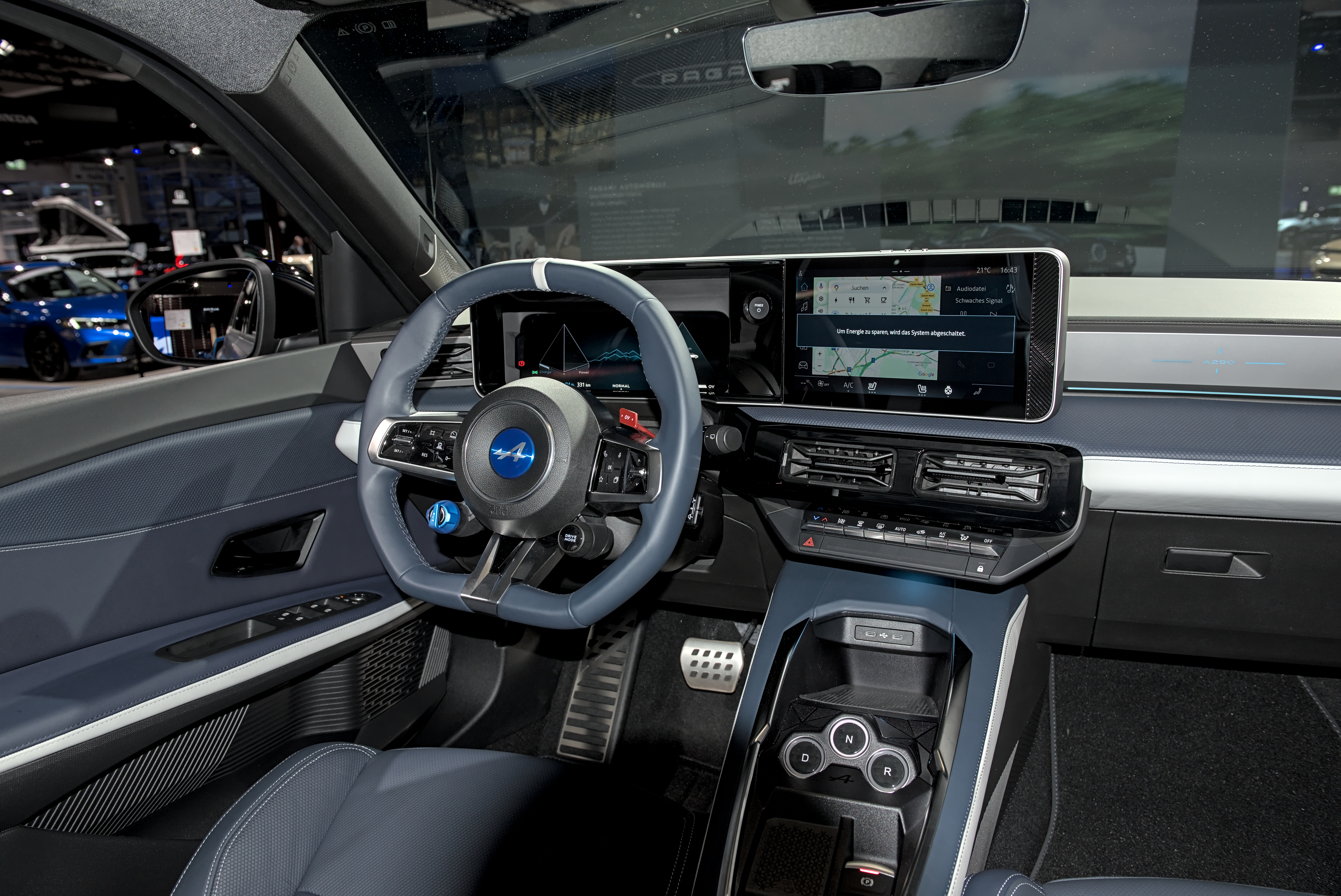
Interior

== Renault 5 Turbo 3E ==
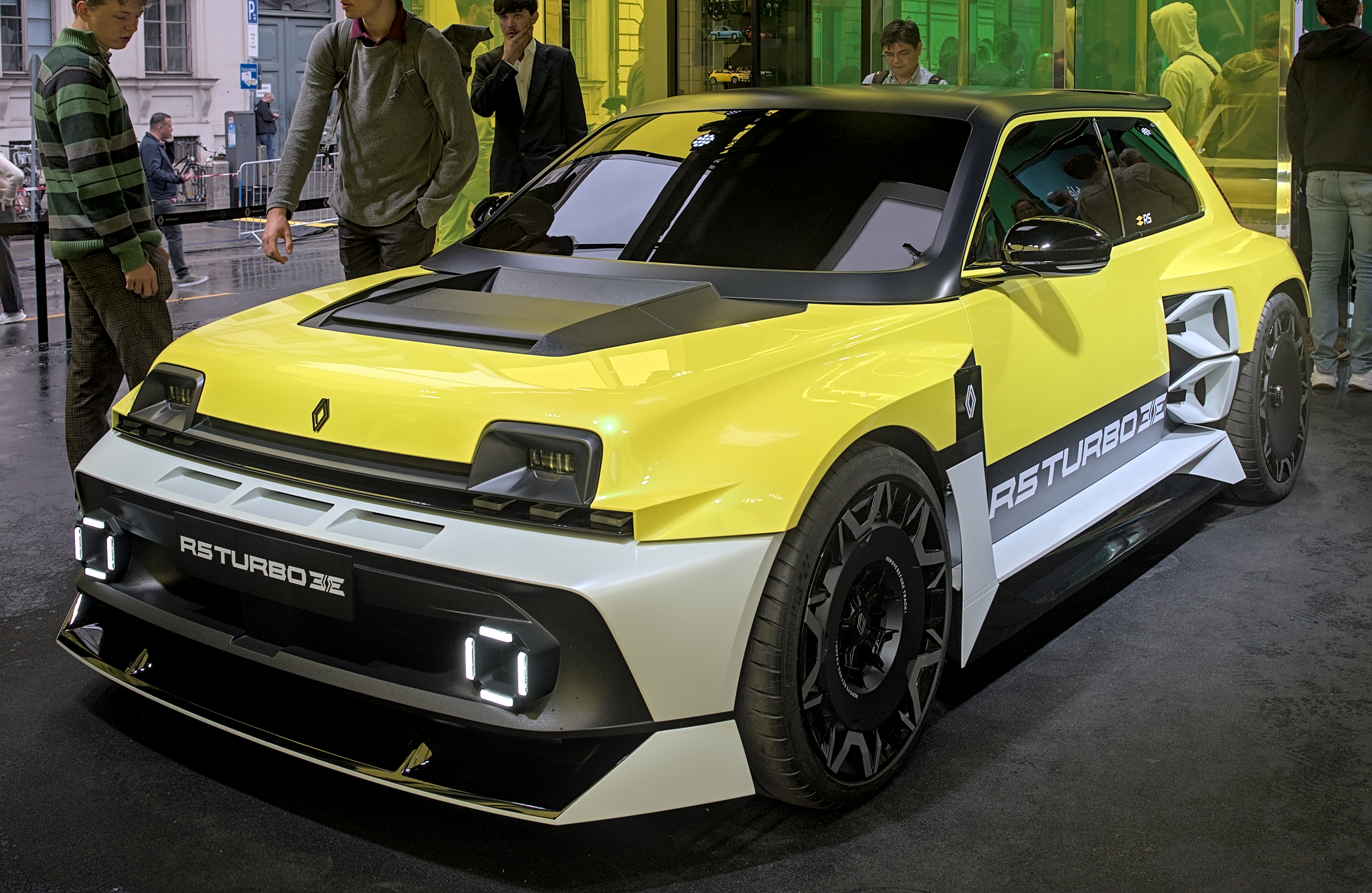
5 Turbo 3E front view

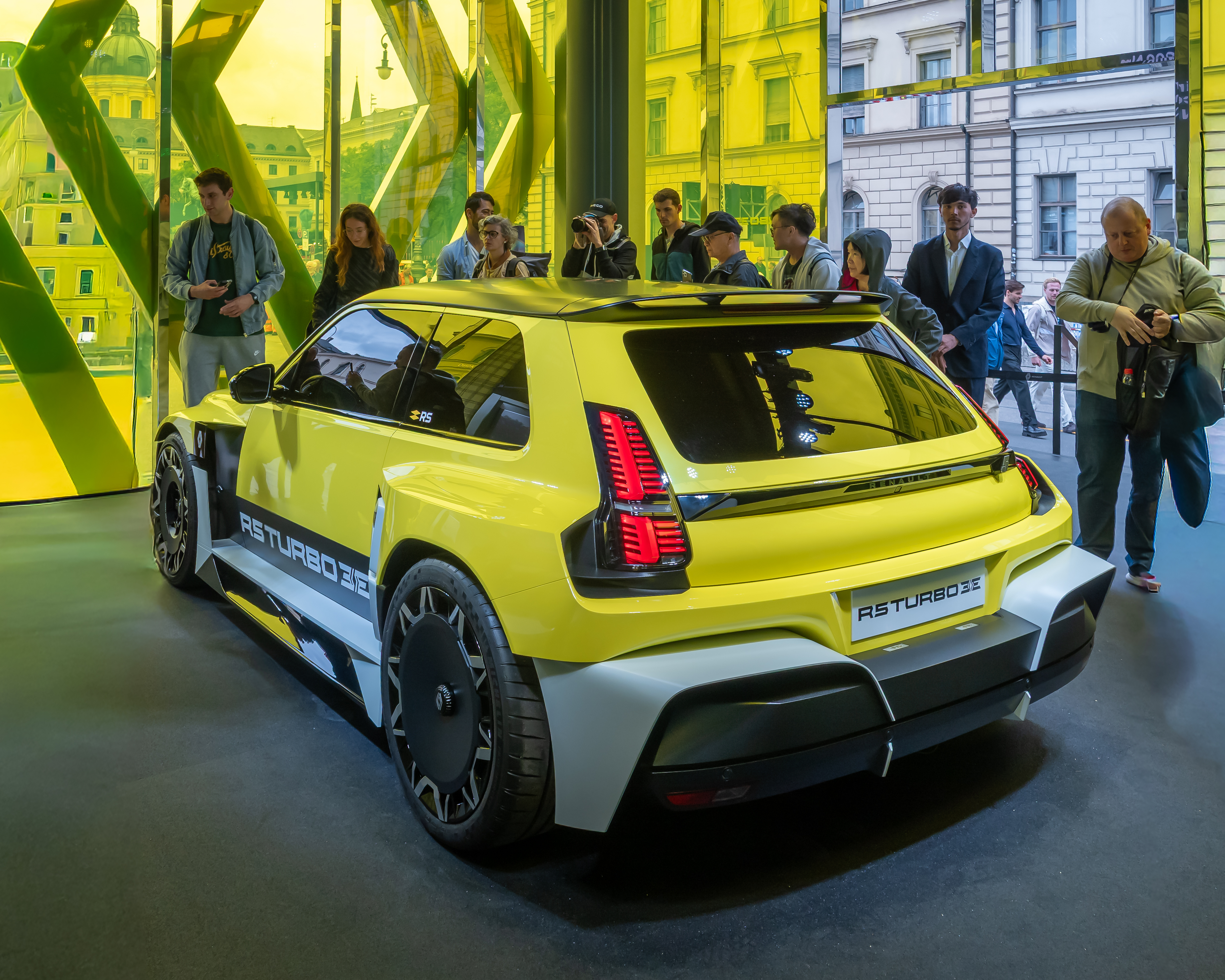
5 Turbo 3E rear view

On 17 March 2025, Renault announced a limited edition heavily modified version of the Renault 5 E-Tech named Renault 5 Turbo 3E, as a homage to the 1980s Renault 5 Turbo wide-body hatchback. The company plans to make 1,980 units (the year of the original Renault 5 Turbo) and start deliveries in 2027. The car has in-wheel motors powering the rear wheels for a total of 536 horsepower (400 kW; 543 PS), and a carbon-fiber body.

== Electromods ==
As part of Renault's 50th anniversary celebrations of the original R5 in 2022, the manufacturer presented two "electromods": restomods of the original R5, repowered with electric drivetrains. These were similar conceptually to contemporaneous electrified restomods such as the Hyundai Heritage Series and Ford F-100 Eluminator.

=== R5 Diamant ===
The R5 Diamant is a one-off vehicle that uses the original R5 body panels and silhouette with detail updates, such as protruding headlights and taillights providing a jewel-like look. It was styled by Pierre Gonalons, who stated his goal was to "merge automotive codes with those of interior decoration". It marked the 50-year anniversary of the launch of the original R5 and was auctioned in the autumn of 2022, with proceeds going to the organisation Give Me 5. Details on the powertrain were not released.

=== R5 Turbo 3E Concept ===
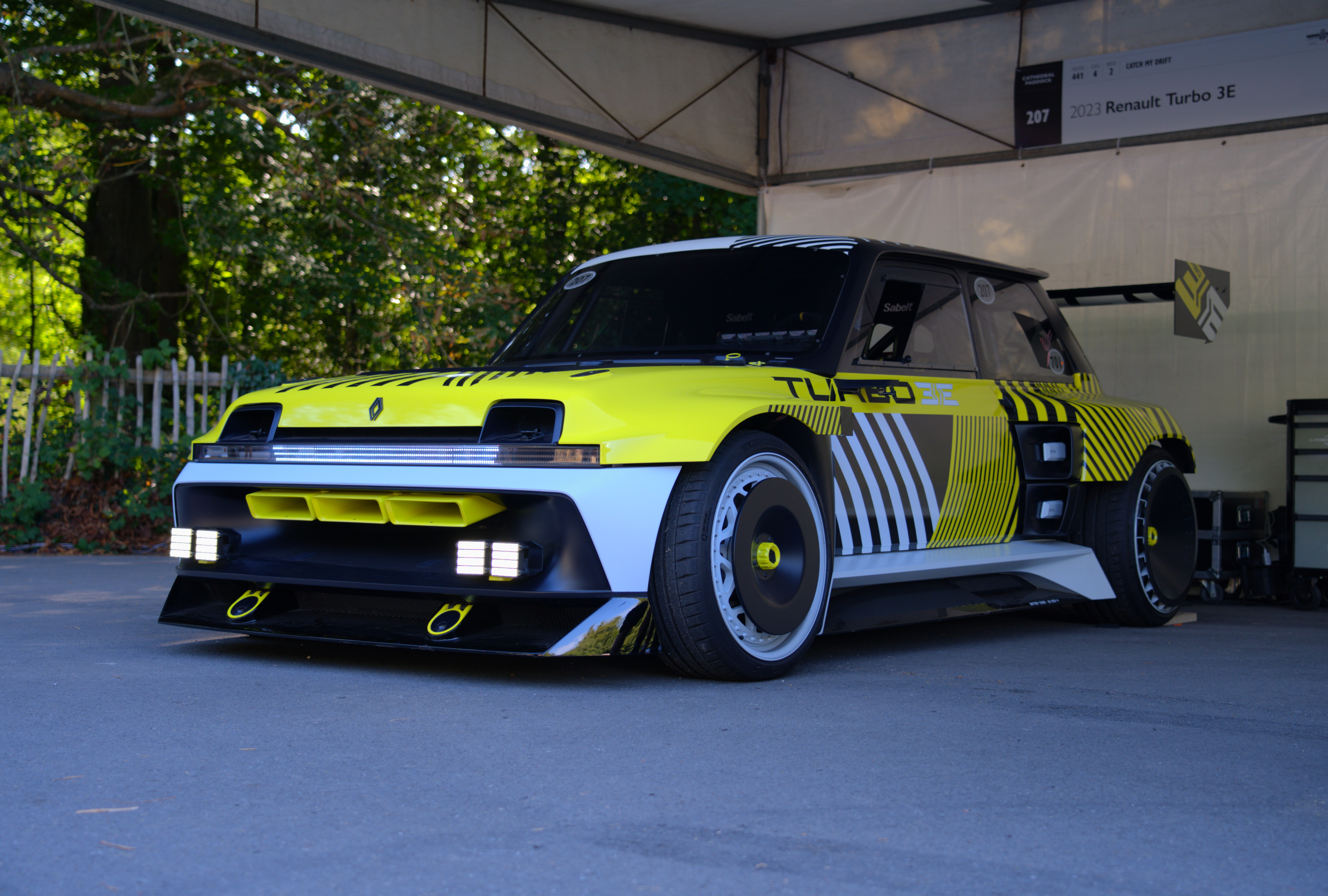
Renault R5 Turbo 3E at the 2025 Goodwood Festival of Speed.

A sporty restomod concept version of the Renault 5 Turbo, dubbed the Renault R5 Turbo 3E and inspired by the 5 Turbo and Turbo 2, was unveiled at the Chantilly Concours d'Elegance on September 25, 2022, also being present at the 2022 Paris Motor Show in October. The car was developed and built by Ligier with input from Yvan Muller.

The Turbo 3E is 4,000 mm (157.5 in) long, 2,000 mm (78.7 in) wide, and 1,320 mm (52.0 in) tall, with a wheelbase of 2,540 mm (100.0 in) on a tubular chassis with a carbon fibre body and a combined output of 280 kW (380 hp) / 700 N⋅m (520 lbf⋅ft) using two electric traction motors, one for each rear wheel. The battery has a storage capacity of 42 kWh. The chassis is a FIA-compliant steel spaceframe. The total weight of the car is 1,500 kg (3,307 lb), of which slightly more than 1/3 is the battery, at 520 kg (1,146 lb).

Estimated performance is 0–100 km/h (0–62 mph) in 3.5 seconds with a top speed of 124 mph (200 km/h).
