= Renault 4 E-Tech =

Battery electric subcompact crossover SUV produced by Renault

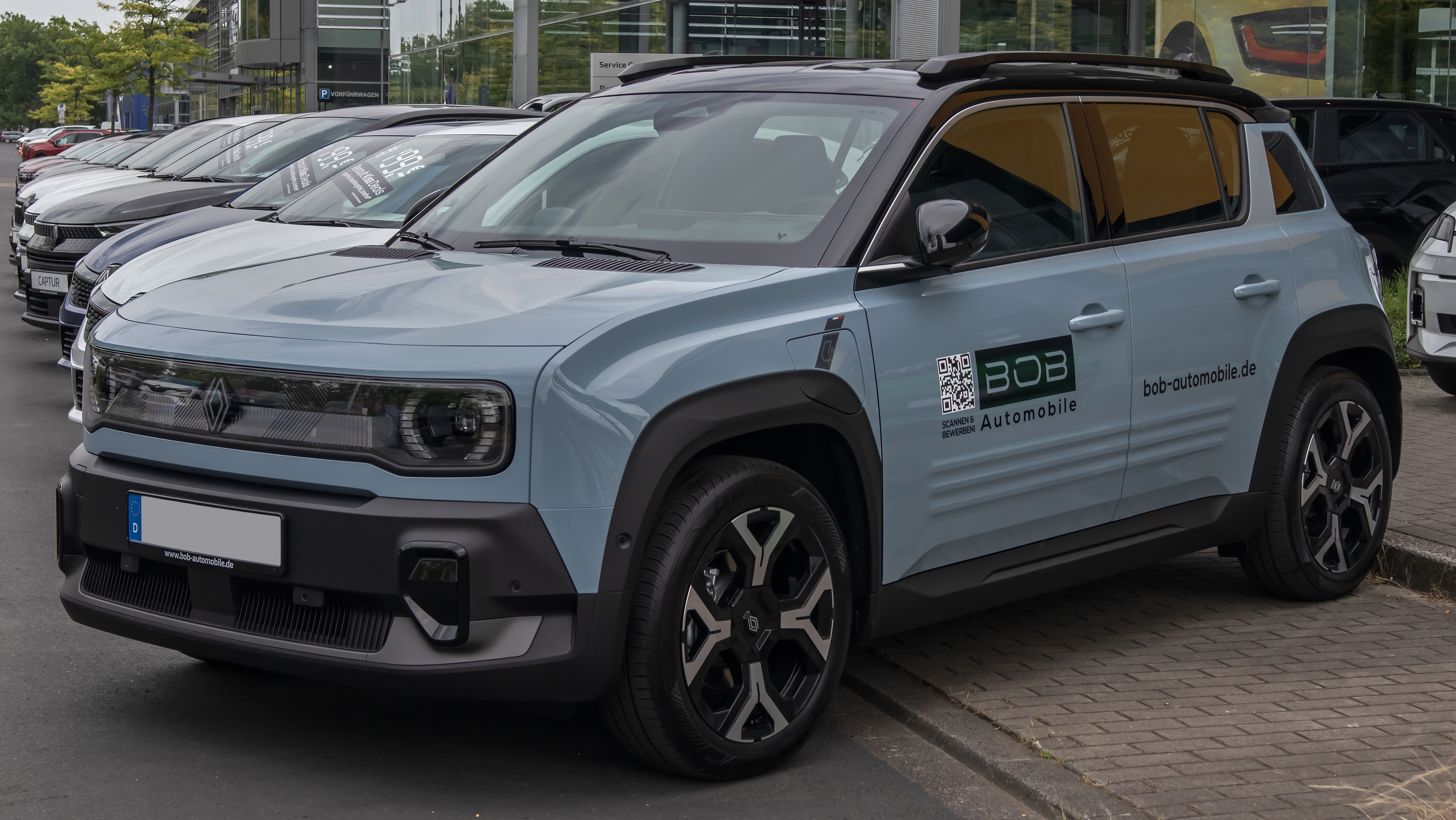
- 2026 Renault 4 E-Tech Electric

Overview
- Manufacturer: Renault
- Production: April 2025 – present
- Assembly: France: Maubeuge (MCA)
- Designer: Gilles Vidal

Body and chassis
- Class: Subcompact crossover SUV (B)
- Body style: 5-door SUV; 5-door panel van
- Platform: AmpR Small
- Related: Alpine A290; Nissan Micra EV; Renault 5 E-Tech; Renault Twingo E-Tech

Dimensions
- Wheelbase: 2,624 mm (103.3 in)
- Length: 4,143 mm (163.1 in)
- Width: 1,796 mm (70.7 in)
- Height: 1,572 mm (61.9 in)
- Kerb weight: 1,410–1,521 kg (3,109–3,353 lb)

The Renault 4 E-Tech is a battery electric subcompact crossover SUV produced by French manufacturer Renault since 2025. It is based on the same AmpR Small platform as the Renault 5 E-Tech, and takes its name from the Renault 4 hatchback that was produced from 1961 to 1994.

== Overview ==
=== History ===
In 2021, the Renault 4ever was announced as one of several new EVs Renault would introduce by 2025. "4Ever" is the name of the EV project that resulted in the 4Ever Trophy prototype concept car first shown at the Paris Motor Show in October 2022. The 4 E-Tech is a compact crossover cousin of the forthcoming all-electric Renault 5 E-Tech. Both the 4 E-Tech and 5 E-Tech are based on the same AmpR Small platform; because the AmpR Small platform shares half of its components with the existing CMF-B platform, production costs are expected to be two-thirds of the current B-segment EV offered by Renault, the Zoe. The 4 E-Tech is expected to sell at a premium compared to the 5 E-Tech; the relationship between the 5 E-Tech and the 4 E-Tech is expected to be analogous to the relationship between the CMF-B based Clio and Captur.

A commercial panel van variant is also planned which share the front end and front compartment of the 4 E-Tech with an enlarged cargo area, similar to the relationship between the R4 Fourgonnette and the original Renault 4.

The 4 E-Tech is built alongside the 5 E-Tech at Renault ElectriCity, a planned union of three existing Renault factories in northern France, Douai, Maubeuge, and Ruitz; ElectriCity is scheduled to produce 400,000 EVs per year by 2025. Both the SUV and van variant of the 4 E-Tech are planned to be assembled at Maubeuge, while 5 E-Tech is assembled at Douai; because the AmpR Small cousin Nissan Micra EV also planned to be assembled at Douai, production of the 4 E-Tech SUV was shifted to Maubeuge. In addition, Renault plans to build a new battery factory in Douai as a joint venture with Envision AESC.

Standard equipment on the electric Renault 4 includes a digital instrument cluster, the OpenR Link infotainment system, required driver-assistance systems, rear parking sensors with a reversing camera, keyless entry and start, and a wireless smartphone charger.

=== Earlier use of "4ever" and electromod ===
In 2011, Renault sponsored the "Renault 4ever" contest that "aim[ed] to revive the R4's spirit" and celebrated the original R4's 50th anniversary. The contest was held conjunction with the web magazine designboom. The competition was won by Mark Cunningham, who received a vintage R4 rally car.

In 2019, a vintage R4 Plein Air convertible was restored and shown at the 10th annual Renault 4L International Festival in 2019. The one-off electromod also was fitted with a battery-electric powertrain borrowed from the Twizy; the single traction motor had an output of 13 kW (17 hp) and 57 N⋅m (42 lbf⋅ft) of torque, and the 6.1 kW-hr battery gave it a range of approximately 100 km (62 mi).

== Production model ==
The production model was revealed on 15 October 2024 at the 2024 Paris Motor Show.

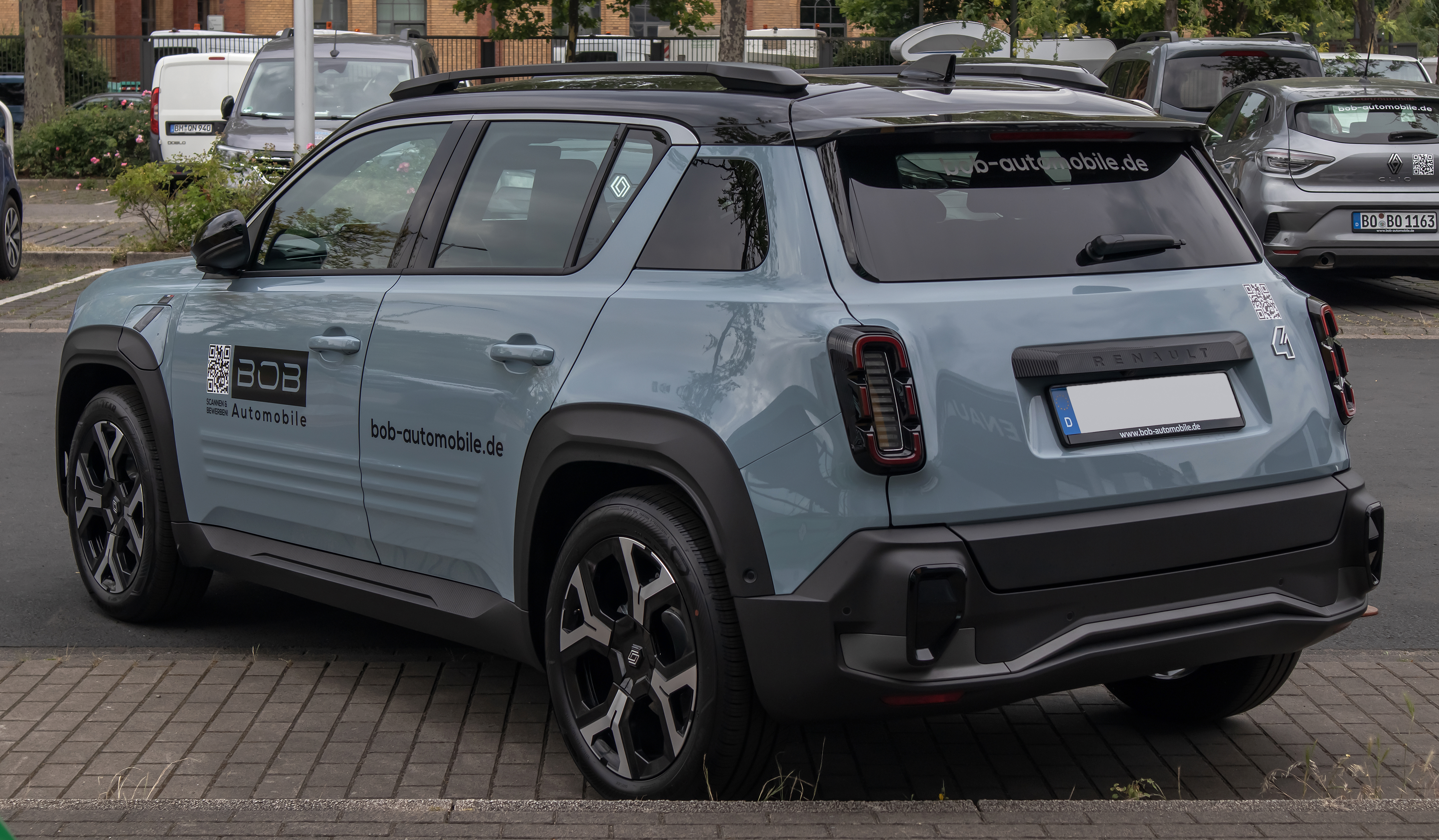
Rear view

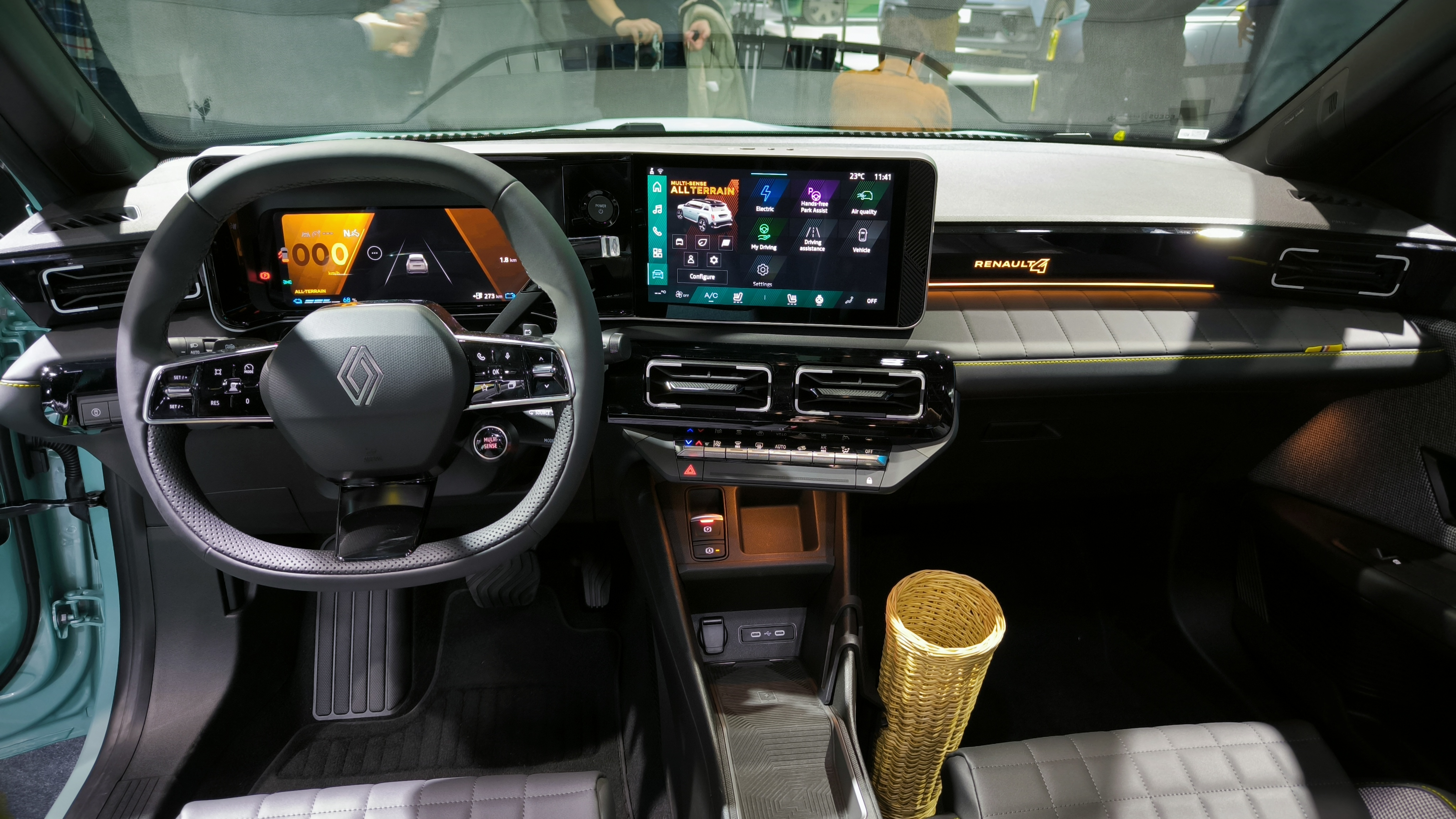
Interior

=== Safety ===
Euro NCAP test results Renault 4 E-Tech EV52 Techno (LHD) (2024)
Test	Points	%
Overall:	4 /5 stars	
Adult occupant:	32	79%
Child occupant:	41.9	85%
Pedestrian:	46.3	73%
Safety assist:	12.4	68%

== Concept car ==
A few teaser photos were released on 4 October, ahead of the official debut on 17 October 2022. The concept 4Ever Trophy was built to celebrate the 25th anniversary of the 4L Trophy humanitarian rally, and was equipped with modifications to increase its off-road capabilities, including a raised suspension giving a ground clearance of 200 mm (7.9 in) and a custom carbon-fibre roof rack with LED lighting housing the vehicle's spare tire.

The centre section of AmpR Small is modified from the conventional CMF-B to accommodate a flat, underfloor battery. Based on planned AmpR Small specifications, the 4ever is expected to have a range of up to 400 km (250 mi) using an electric traction motor with a maximum output of 100 kW (130 hp). Powertrain details of the 2022 Trophy concept confirmed the power output and battery capacity (42 kW-hr), but the range was not rated as it was not a drivable prototype.

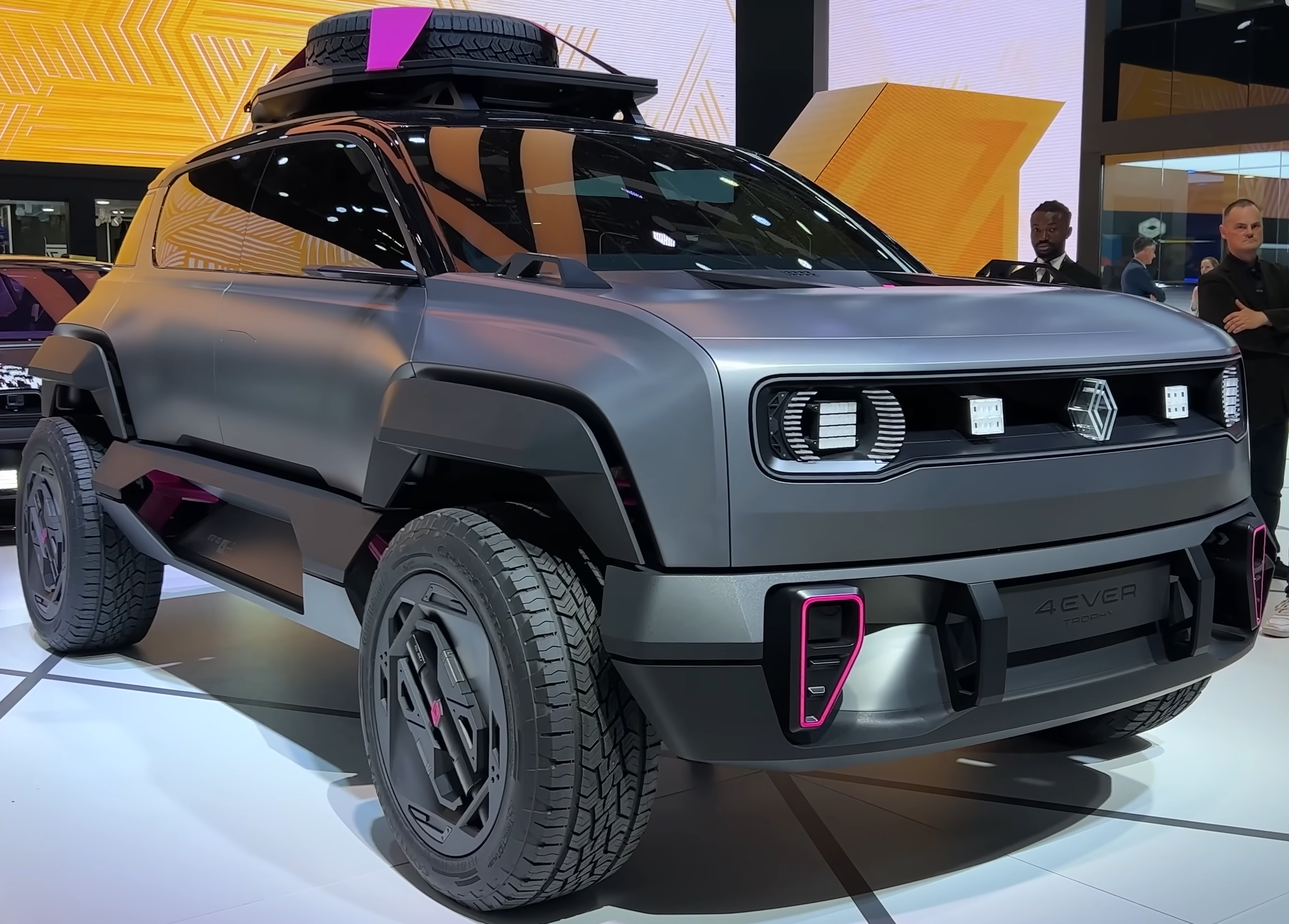

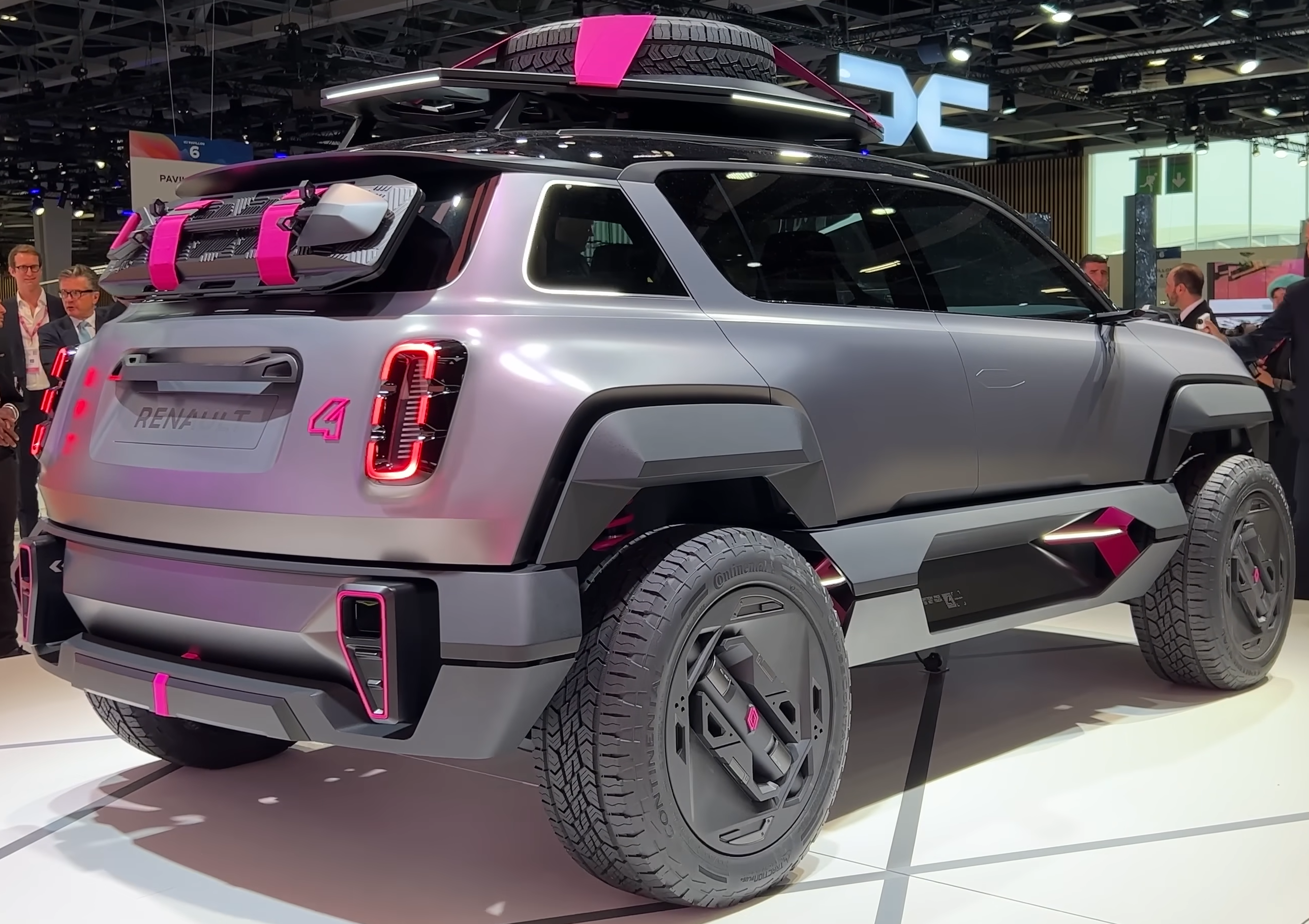
