= Peugeot SR1 =

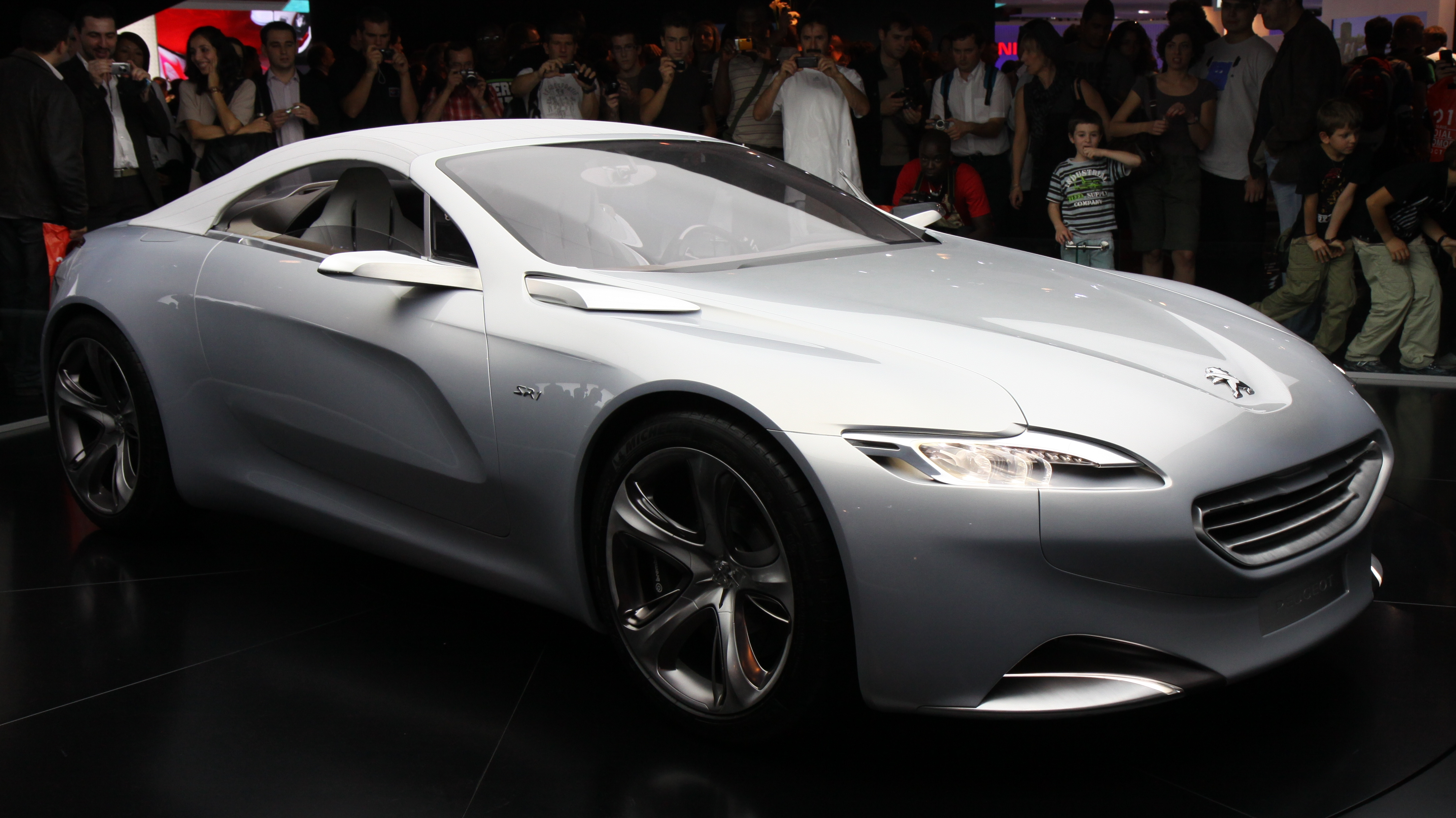

Overview
- Manufacturer: Peugeot
- Production: 2010
- Designer: Gilles Vidal

Body and chassis
- Class: Concept car
- Body style: 2-door convertible

Powertrain
- Engine: 1.6 L THP hybrid

Dimensions
- Wheelbase: 2,595 mm (102.2 in)
- Length: 4,823 mm (189.9 in)
- Width: 1,917 mm (75.5 in)
- Height: 1,246 mm (49.1 in)
- Curb weight: 1,525 kg (3,362 lb)

The Peugeot SR1 is a convertible, hybrid concept car by Peugeot. It was unveiled to the general public at the Geneva Motor Show, in March 2010.

== Overview ==
The SR1 concept incorporates HYbrid4 technology, which was launched in the Peugeot 3008 in 2011. In the SR1, at the front, a 1.6-litre THP petrol engine with a power of 160 kW (218 PS; 215 hp), is combined with a rear electric motor developing 70 kW (95 PS; 94 hp). In electric only mode, the car becomes a ZEV (zero emission vehicle), while its combined cycle fuel consumption is only 4.9 litres per 100 kilometres (58 mpg_{‑imp}; 48 mpg_{‑US}) and 119 g/km of CO_{2}. When the two power trains operate simultaneously, the SR1 develops a potential maximum power of 230 kW (313 PS; 308 hp) and also benefits from 4-wheel drive.

Because the SR1 concept was presented together with the new Peugeot brand identity - and its well-known lion - designers all over the world have seemingly been very eager to capture the new design directions chosen by the French giant, in an attempt to understand where the brand would position itself in terms of design, in the near future.

== Technical characteristics ==
=== Engines ===
==== Front, 1.6 L THP ====
Cubic Capacity	1598 cc
Maximum power	190 kW (258 PS; 255 hp)
Maximum torque	280 N⋅m (210 lb⋅ft)
Maximum torque with overboost	300 N⋅m (220 lb⋅ft)

==== Rear, electric ====
Synchronous with permanent magnets

Continuous power	40 kW (54 PS; 54 hp)
Maximum power (peak)	70 kW (95 PS; 94 hp)
Continuous torque	102 N⋅m (75 lb⋅ft)
Maximum torque (peak)	178 N⋅m (131 lb⋅ft)

==== THP + Electric ====
Maximum power	230 kW (313 PS; 308 hp)

==== Tires ====
Type	Michelin
Dimensions	255 40 R20

==== Transmission ====
Electronically controlled 6-speed transmission

==== Performance ====
(driver only)

Acceleration, 0 to 1,000 m (0.62 mi)	23.2 s
Acceleration, 0 to 100 km/h (62 mph)	4.7 s
In-gear acceleration, 80 km/h (50 mph) to 120 km/h (75 mph) in auto position	3,0
Maximum speed	290 km/h (180 mph)

==== Fuel consumption ====
Fuel tank	50 L (13 US gal; 11 imp gal)
Combined fuel consumption: litres/100 km (MPG); CO_{2} (g/km)	4.9 L/100 km (58 mpg_{‑imp}; 48 mpg_{‑US}); 119
ZEV (Zero Emission Vehicle)
Fuel consumption (litres/100 km)	0
CO_{2} (g/km)	0
Maximum range at stable speed	12,5 km

==== Dimensions ====
Overall length	4,823 mm (189.9 in)
Overall body width	1,917 mm (75.5 in)
Kerb height - with full tanks	1,246 mm (49.1 in)
Wheelbase	2,595 mm (102.2 in)
Front / rear overhang	872 mm (34.3 in) / 956 mm (37.6 in)
Front / rear track	1,648 mm (64.9 in) / 1,648 mm (64.9 in)

==== Others ====
Kerb weight with full tanks	1,525 kg (3,362 lb)
Cx/SCx	0,27 / 0,55

== Gallery ==
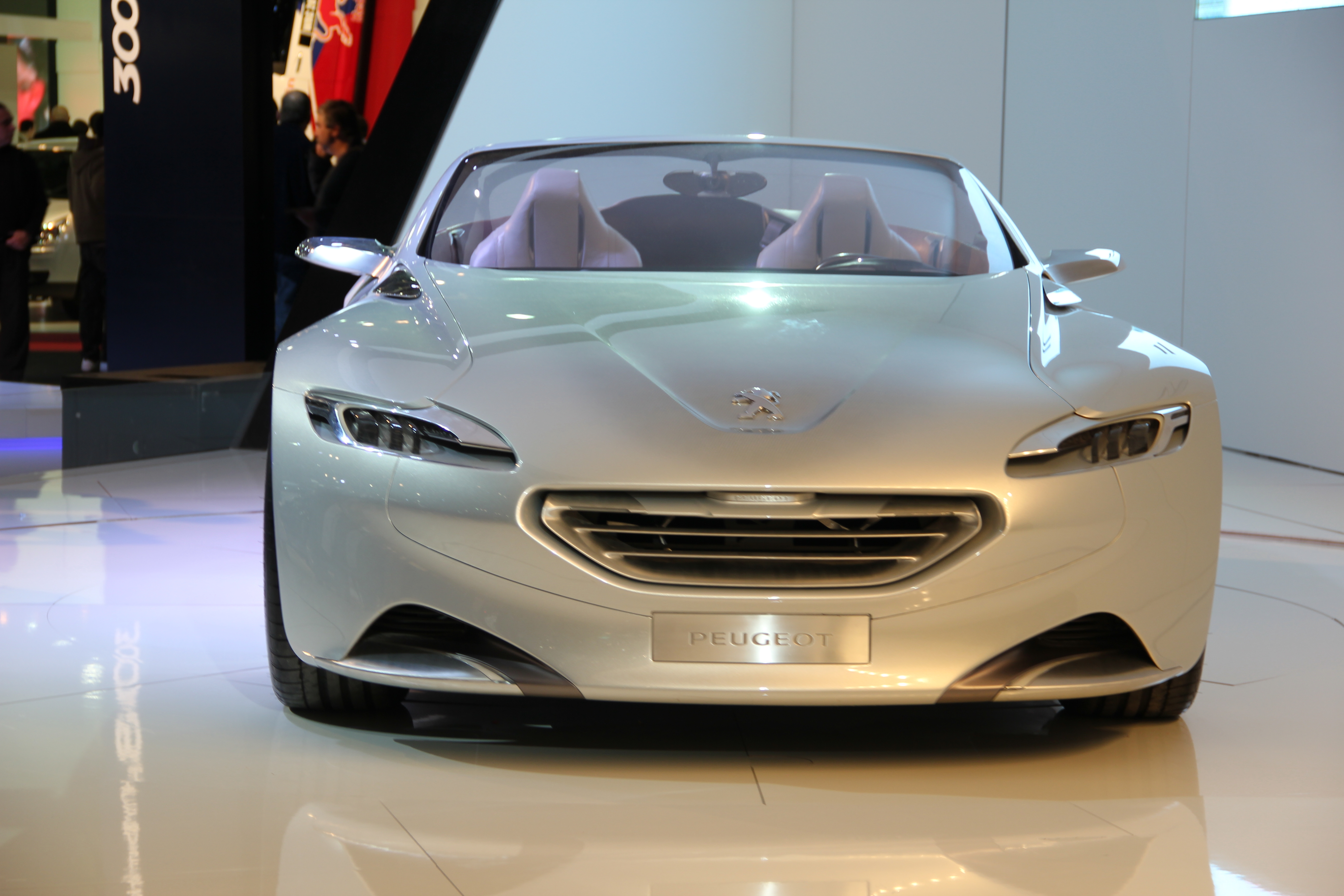
Front view

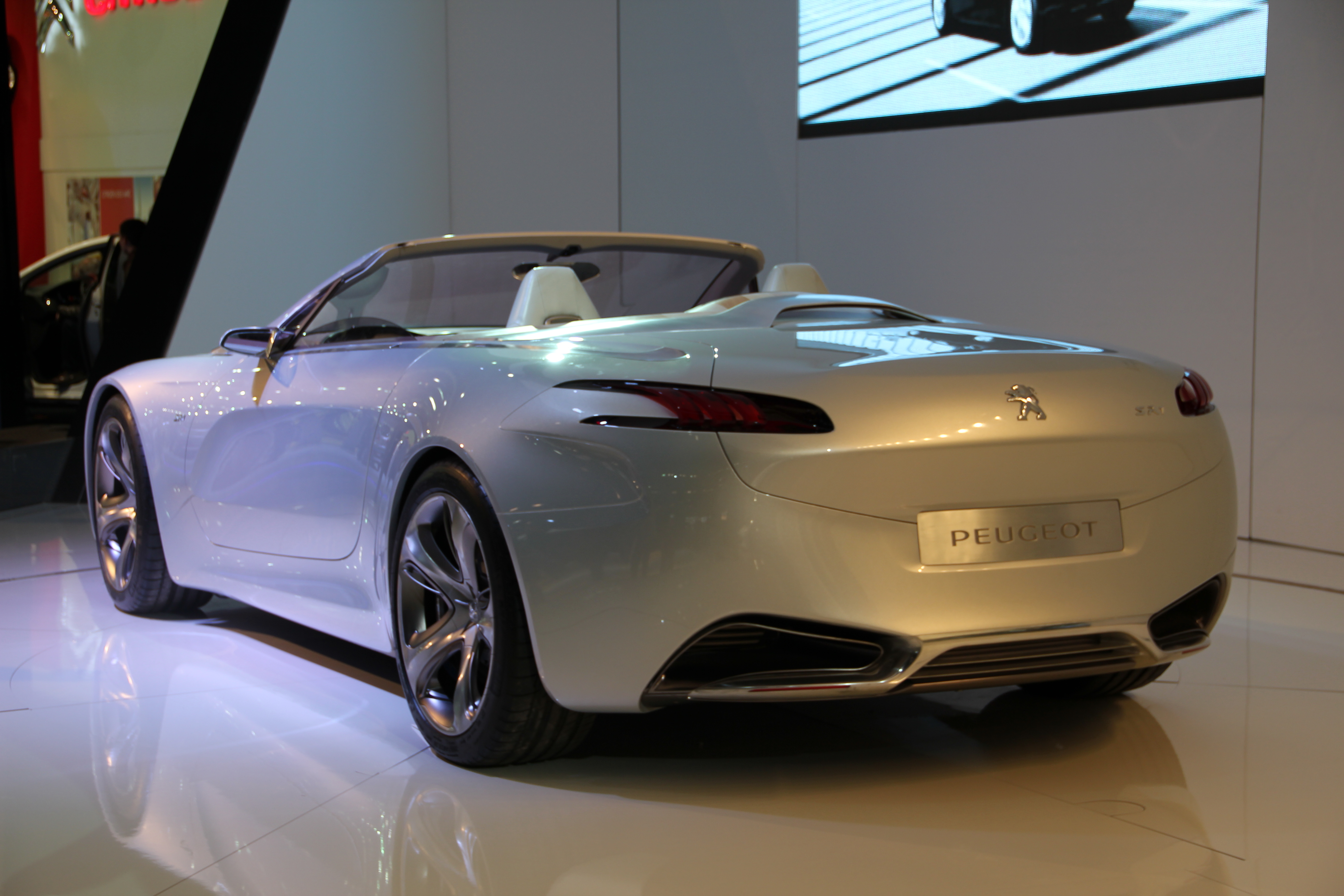
Rear view

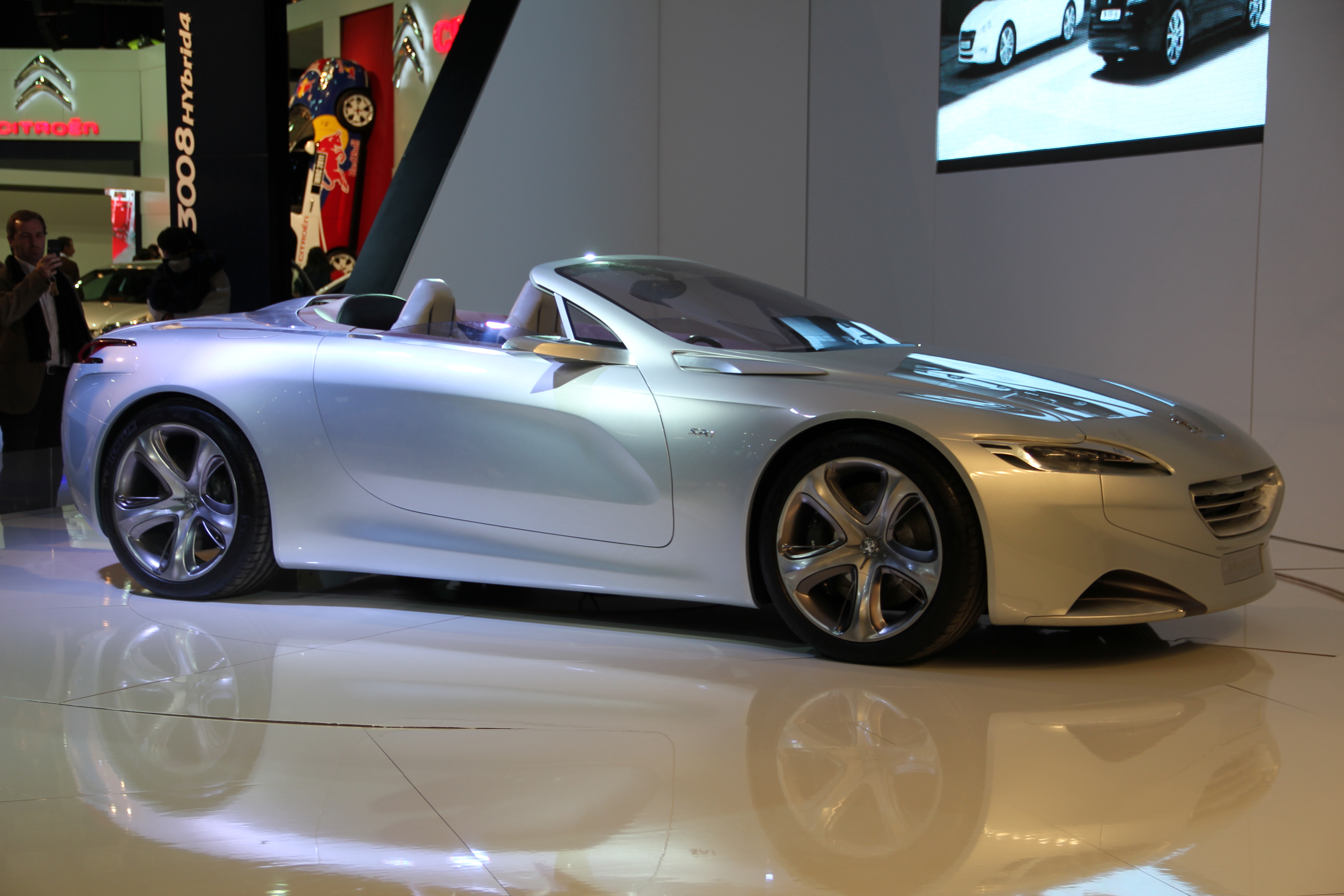
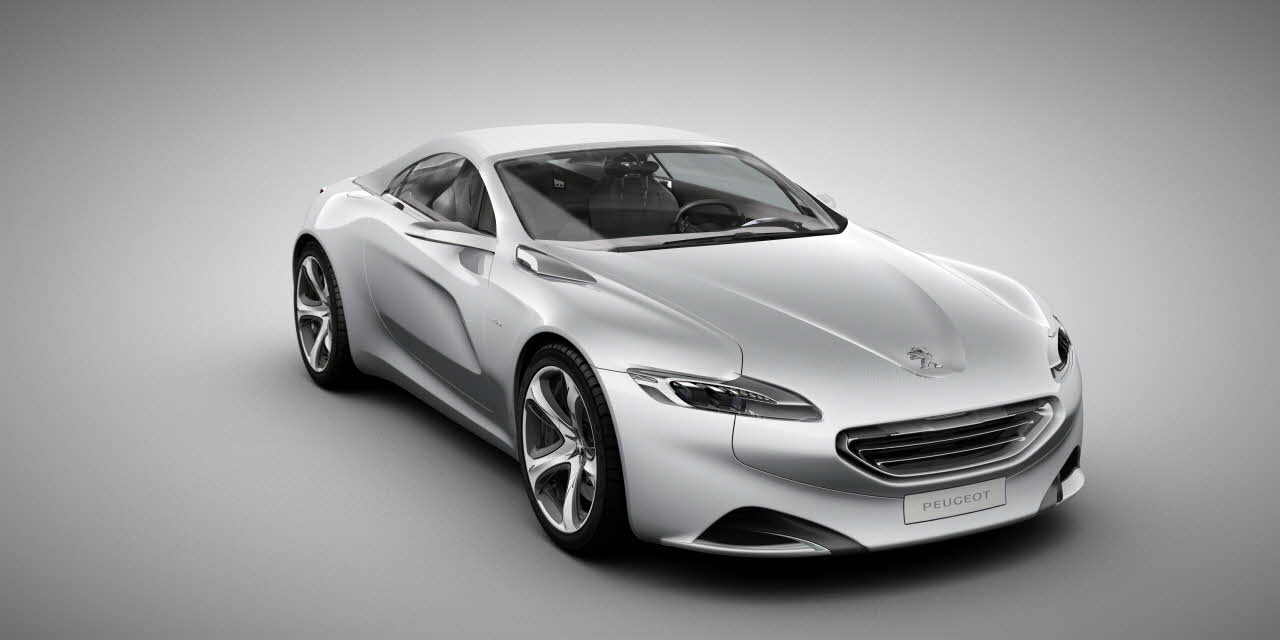

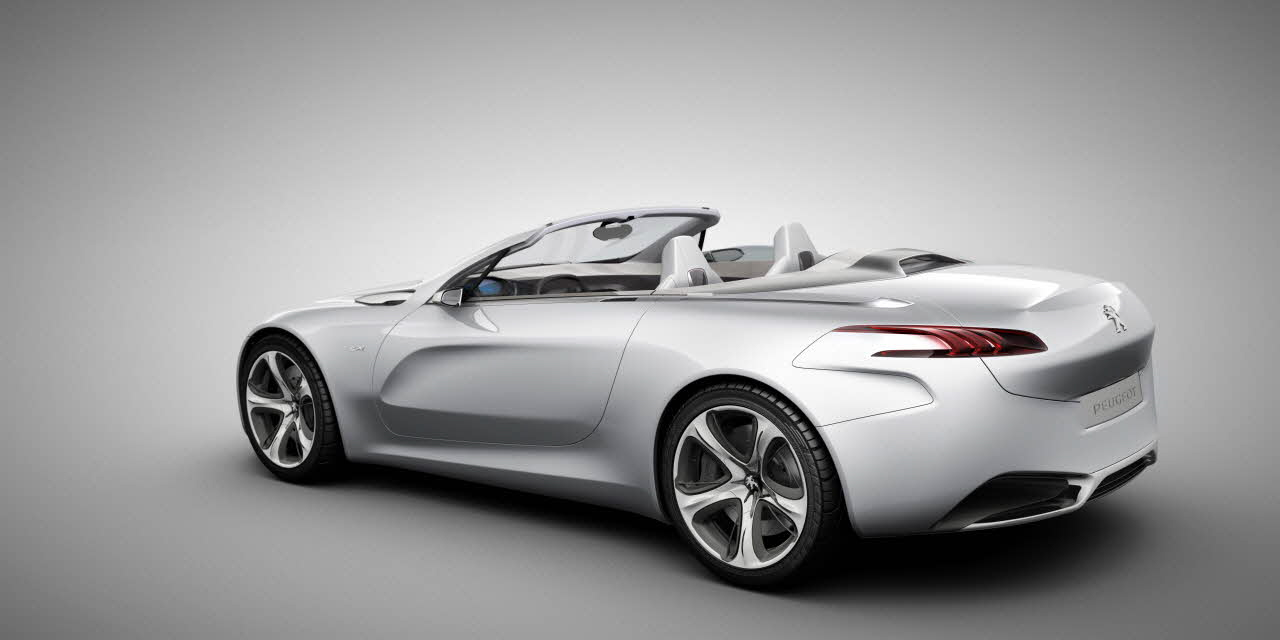

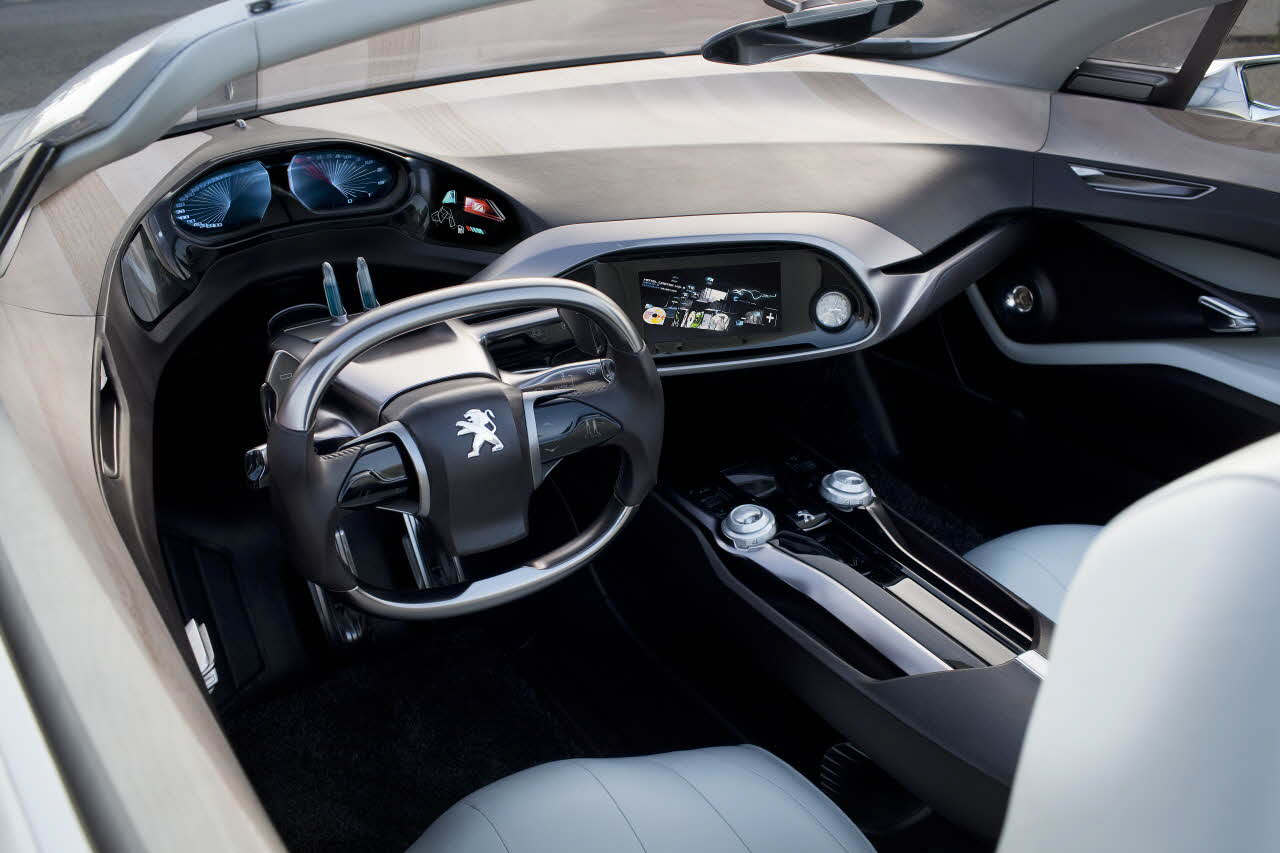
Interior

== See also ==
=== Featured ===
Asphalt 8: Airborne

Asphalt 9: Legends
