= Gilles Vidal =

French automobile designer

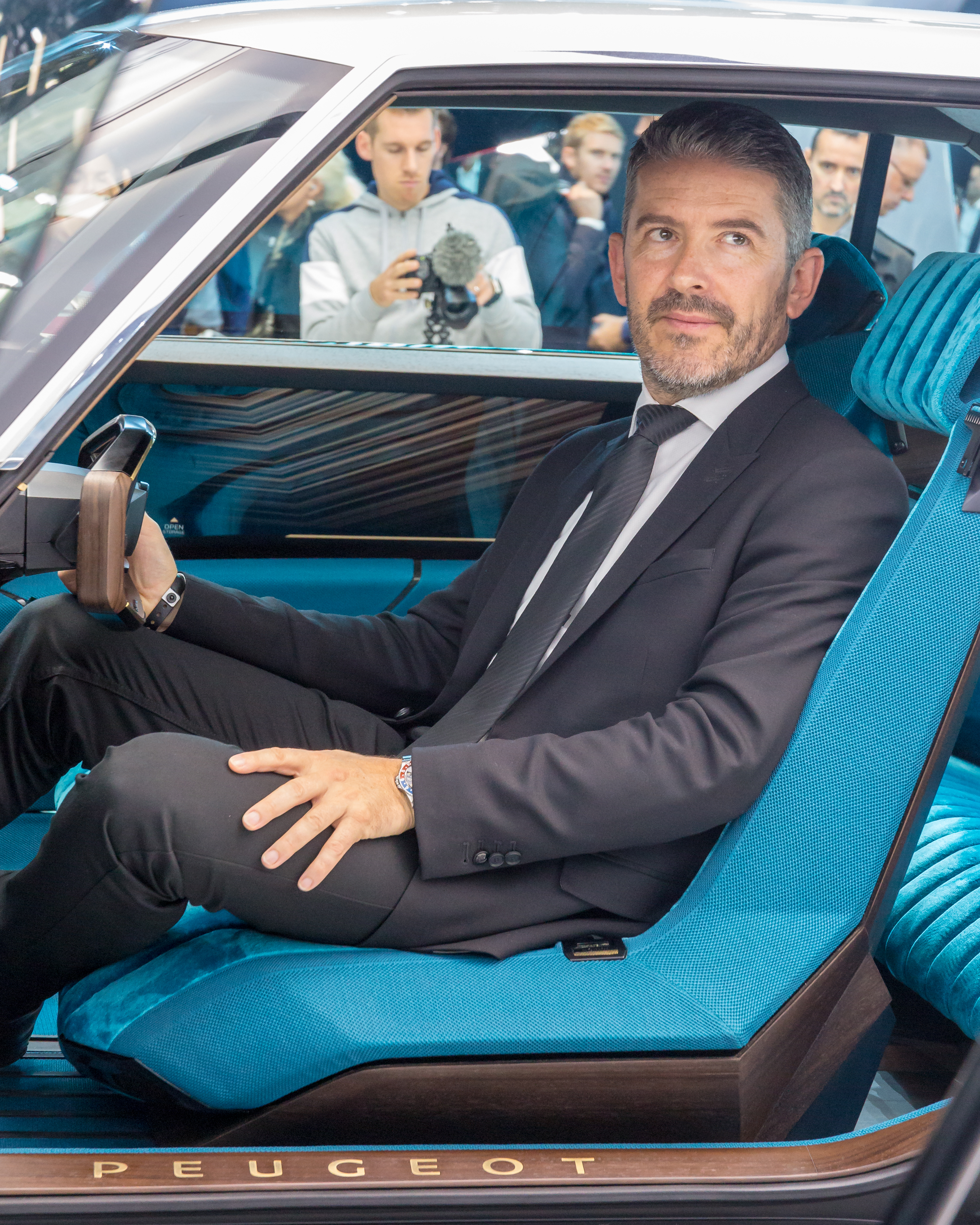
Gilles Vidal 2018

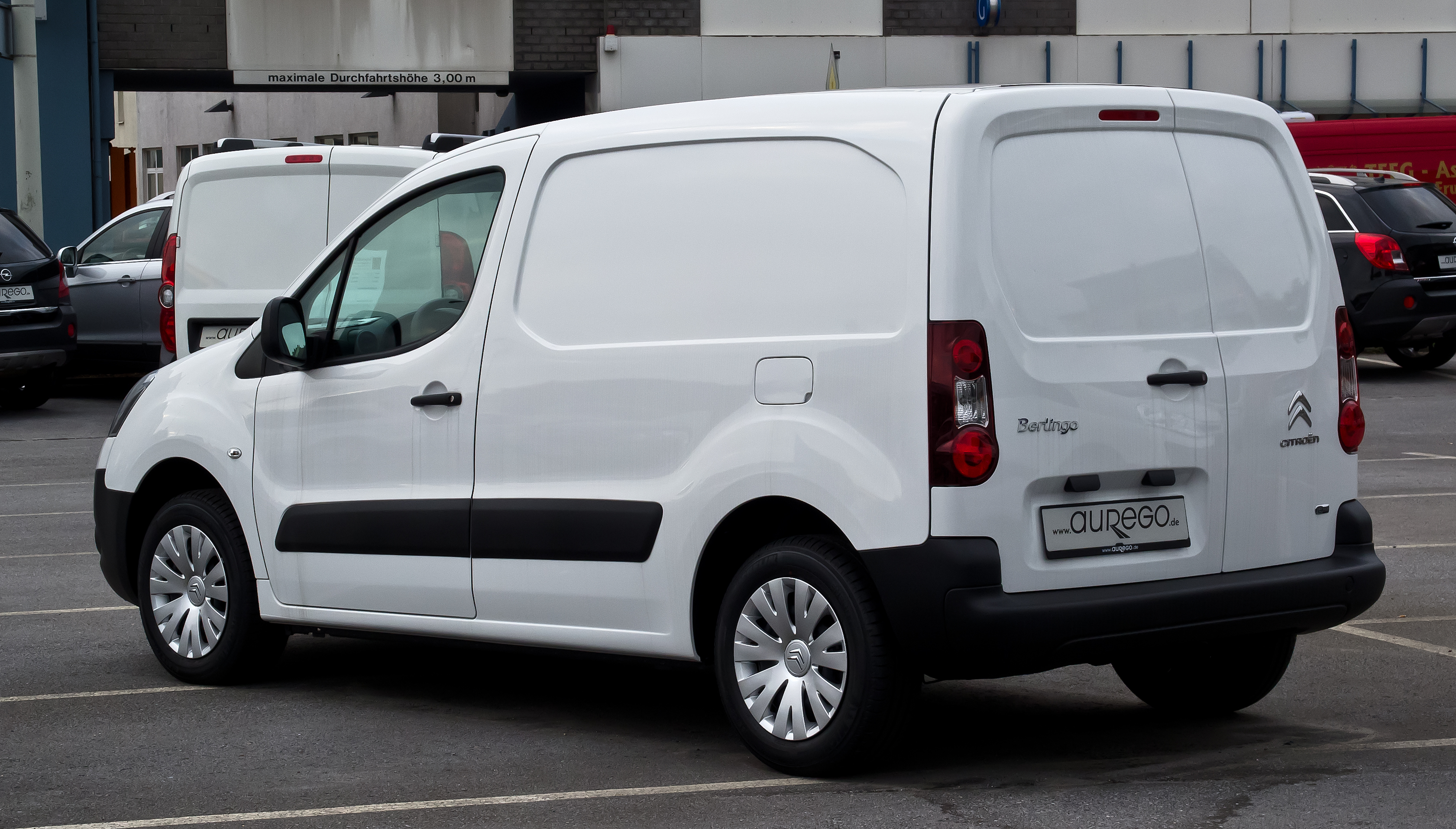
Citroën Berlingo

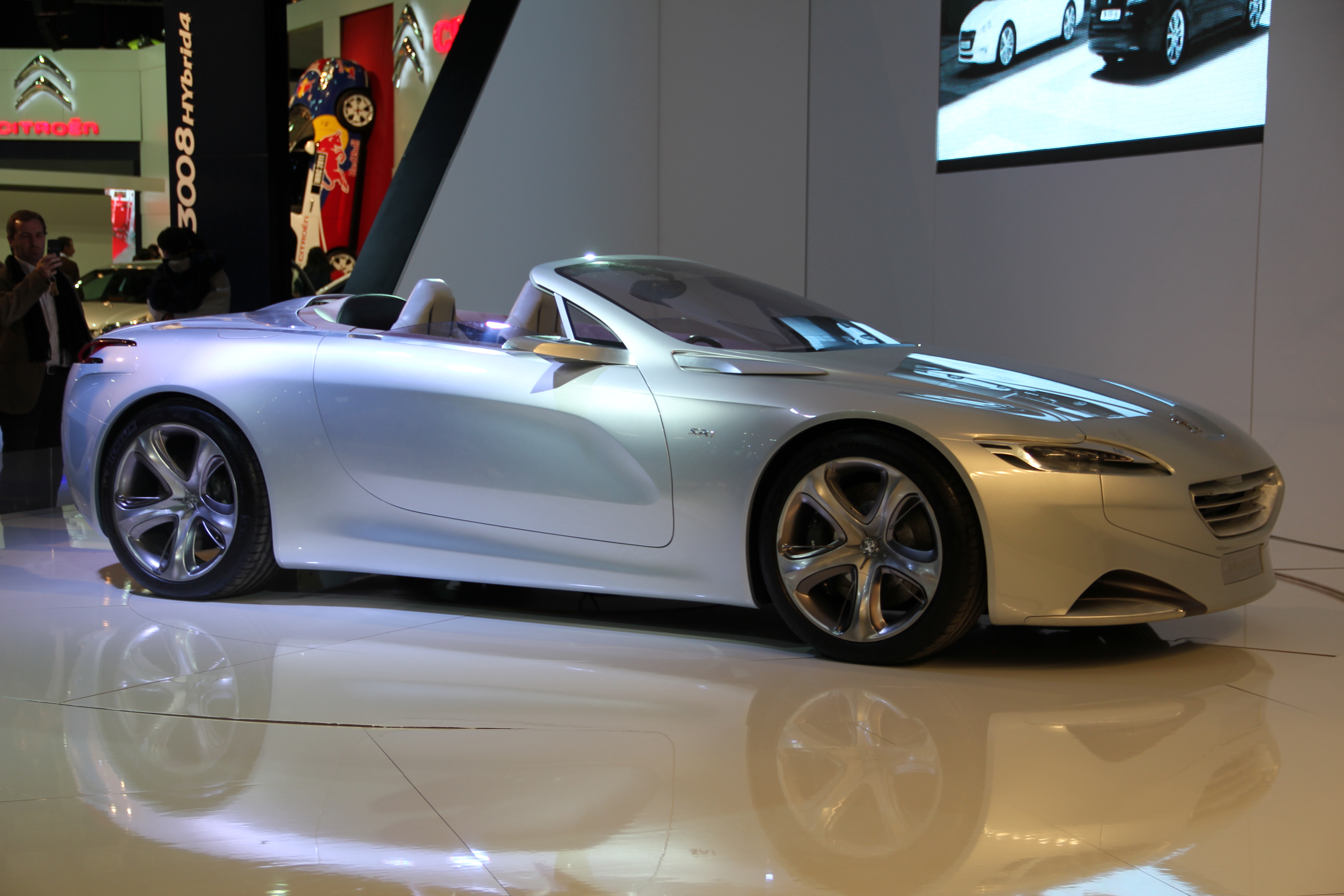
Peugeot SR1

Gilles Vidal (born ca. 1972) is a French car designer, appointed Director of Style by Peugeot in early-2010. He was responsible for the design direction of the 2010s decade at Peugeot. He was the design director at Renault between 2020 and October 2025, but then rejoined Stellantis as the design director for Stellantis European brands.

== Biographical note ==
Vidal received his diploma from the Art Center College of Design in Vevey, Switzerland and joined Citroën in 1996. Here he worked with Jean-Pierre Ploué and was responsible for the restyled Berlingo, the rally version of the Saxo and the “Osmose” (Osmosis) concept car. In 2005, he assumed overall responsibility for Citroën's concept cars.

After his boss at Citroën, Jean-Pierre Ploué, was promoted to a position of responsibility for styling of both the Citroën and Peugeot brands in 2009, Gilles Vidal assumed responsibility for concept cars in the Peugeot style, supervising the Peugeots BB1 and SR1. He took a major part in defining the new identity for the Peugeot brand which would be unveiled at the beginning of 2010, and in January 2010, Ploué appointed him Peugeot Design Director.

Vidal was responsible for the design direction at Peugeot during the 2010s. His departure from Peugeot was announced in July 2020. He joined Renault as their design director that same year. In July 2025, Peugeot's parent company Stellantis announced his return as head of design for their European brands.
