= Australia (disambiguation) =

Australia is a country in the Southern Hemisphere.

Australia may also refer to:

== Places ==
- Name of Australia relates the history of the term, as applied to various places.

=== Oceania ===
- Australia (continent), or Sahul, the landmasses which sit on Australia's continental plate
- Mainland Australia, the current continental landmass of Australia

==== Variant spelling ====
- La Austrialia [sic] del Espíritu Santo, an early Spanish name for the group of islands now known as Vanuatu

=== Elsewhere ===
- Australia, Cuba, a village in Cuba
- Australia, Mississippi, a ghost town in the United States
- Australia, Markham, a former community in Markham, Ontario, Canada

== Film and television ==
- Australia (1989 film), directed by Jean-Jacques Andrien
- Australia (2008 film), directed by Baz Luhrmann
- "Australia" (Modern Family), an episode of the TV series Modern Family
- "Australia" (ChuckleVision), an episode of the ChuckleVision children's television show
- Australia: The Story of Us, a 2015 television documentary drama series

== Music ==
=== Albums ===
- Australia (Cusco album), 1993
- Australia (Howie Day album), 2000
- Australia (EP), by Ace Enders, 2009

=== Songs ===
- "Australia" (The Kinks song), 1969
- "Australia", by Steve Howe from Beginnings, 1975
- "Australia" (Manic Street Preachers song), 1996
- "Australia", by the Bicycles from The Good, the Bad and the Cuddly, 2006
- "Australia" (The Shins song), 2007
- "Australia", by the Jonas Brothers from Jonas Brothers, 2007
- "Australia" (Gyroscope song), 2008
- "Australia (Whore of the World)", by John Gordon, 2010
- "Australia", by Amanda Palmer from Amanda Palmer Goes Down Under, 2010

== Ships ==
- Australia (schooner), a schooner used as a blockade runner in the American Civil War
- Australia (yacht), competed in the 1977 and 1980 America's Cups
- Australia II, a 12-metre yacht, Australia's first successful America's Cup challenger
- HMAS Australia, three ships in the Royal Australian Navy
- HMS Australia (1886), a ship in the Royal Navy

== Other ==
- 45563 Australia, a British LMS Jubilee Class locomotive
- Australia (LB&SCR no. 48), a London, Brighton and South Coast Railway B4 class 4-4-0 tender locomotive
- Australia, the Geographic Beanie Baby bear produced in honour of Australia
- Australia (board game), a board game by Ravensburger
- Australia (horse), a racehorse foaled in 2011
- Australia Girault, 1925, a junior synonym of the wasp genus Parachalcerinys
- Australia: National Journal (1939–1946), art and lifestyle magazine

== See also ==
- Austral (disambiguation)
- Austrasia
- Australasia
- Australian (disambiguation)
- Austria
- The Australian (disambiguation)
- Oceania (disambiguation)
- Outline of Australia
- Terra Australis
- Austria (disambiguation)
