= Austral =

Austral means 'southern', often in reference to the Southern Hemisphere.

Austral may also refer to:

== Businesses ==
- Austral Airlines, a list of airlines named Austral
- Austral (bus manufacturer), a defunct Australian bus body manufacturer

== Education ==
- Austral University, a private university in Argentina
- Universidad Austral de Chile, a Chilean traditional university

== Entertainment venues ==
- The Austral, a pub in Rundle Street, Adelaide, South Australia
- Austral Picture Palace, Kilkenny, South Australia
- Austral Picture Theatre, Collingwood, Victoria, Australia
- Austral Theatre, Naracoorte, South Australia

== Events ==
- Austral Wheel Race, the world's oldest track bicycle race, held in Victoria, Australia
- Australasian Intervarsity Debating Championships, a collegiate debating tournament also known as the "Australs"

== People ==
- Florence Austral, Australian operatic soprano

== Places ==
- Austral, New South Wales, a suburb of Sydney, Australia
- Austral Islands, the southernmost group of islands in French Polynesia
- Zona Austral, the southernmost region of Chile

== Transport ==
Motor vehicles

- Austral (automobile), a French car manufactured in 1907
- Renault Austral, a compact crossover SUV motor vehicle

Ships

- Austral (1881), a passenger ship that sank in 1882 near Sydney, Australia
- El Austral, an Argentine government sailing research ship, built as RV Atlantis in 1930
- L'Austral, a cruise ship built in 2010

== Other uses ==
- Austral language, the language of the Austral Islands
- Argentine austral, a former currency of Argentina
- Austral plan, an economic plan in Argentina

== See also ==
- Austal, an Australian shipbuilder
- Australia, a large country and continent in the Southern Hemisphere
