= Moon Song =

Moon Song or Moonsong may refer to:

== Music ==
=== Songs ===
- "Moon Song (That Wasn't Meant for Me)", a 1932 jazz standard written by Arthur Johnston and Sam Coslow
- "The Moon Song", written by Karen O and Spike Jonze for the 2013 film Her
- "Moon Song", by America from Homecoming, 1972
- "Moon Song", by Doctor and the Medics from Laughing at the Pieces, 1986
- "Moon Song", by My Bloody Valentine from Tremolo, 1991
- "Moon Song", by Phoebe Bridgers from Punisher, 2020
- "Moonsong", by John Gordon, 2009
- "Moonsong", by Parokya ni Edgar from Gulong Itlog Gulong, 1999
- "Moonsong", from Cyrano: The Musical, 1992
- "Moonsong: Pelog", by Joe Byrd from The American Metaphysical Circus, 1969

=== Albums ===
- Moon Song, by Dan Barrett, 1998
- Moonsong, by Adrian von Ziegler, 2016

== Literature ==
- The Hunters: Moonsong, a 2012 Vampire Diaries novel in the Hunters trilogy
- Moonsong and Other Poems, a 1962 poetry collection by Ray Mathew
- "Moonsong", a poem by Hilda Conkling
- Moonsong, a daughter of Riverwind and Goldmoon, fictional characters in the Dragonlance franchise

== See also ==
- Moon (disambiguation) § Songs
