= Renault España =

Manufacturing subsidiary of Renault

Renault España Sociedad Anónima (RESA)
- Company type: Subsidiary
- Industry: Automotive
- Predecessor: FASA-Renault
- Founded: 2000; 26 years ago
- Headquarters: Valladolid, Castille and León, Spain
- Key people: José Antonio López Ramón y Cajal (CEO)
- Production output: ▼492,148 vehicles (2018)
- Revenue: ▼€7,575.7 million (2018)
- Net income: ▲€129.8 million (2018)
- Number of employees: 7,875 (December 2013)
- Parent: Renault
- Subsidiaries: RECSA
- Website: renault.es

Renault España Sociedad Anónima (pronounced [reˈno esˈpaɲa soθjeˈðað aˈnonima] or [reˈnol]), also known by its acronym RESA (Spanish pronunciation: [ˈresa]), is one of the largest manufacturing subsidiaries of Renault. The Spain-based company has facilities in Valladolid, Palencia and Sevilla, with most administrative offices in Madrid. Renault sells its cars locally through the subsidiary RECSA. The company emerged from the local automaker FASA, which had assembled Renault cars since 1953.

== History ==
=== SAEAR ===
In 1908, Louis Renault founded in Spain the Sociedad Anónima Española de Automóviles Renault (Renault Automobiles Limited Company) or SAEAR, the second subsidiary outside the French territory after the English branch. The SAEAR maintained a sustained growth until the 1930s, when it gradually began to show results in deficit. It was affected by the proliferation of protectionist barriers, little demand and declining selling prices, factors that were aggravated by the Spanish Civil War and World War II. Despite the possibility of closing being considered on several occasions, Louis Renault chose to maintain its Spanish subsidiary with the hope the situation would improve. The company diversified its offer, adding the sale of tractors, buses, trucks, war supplying, fuel and other products. It also entered into the car rental market.

In 1949, the 4CV success enabled the SAEAR to resume imports growth.

=== FASA, FASA-Renault and RESA ===
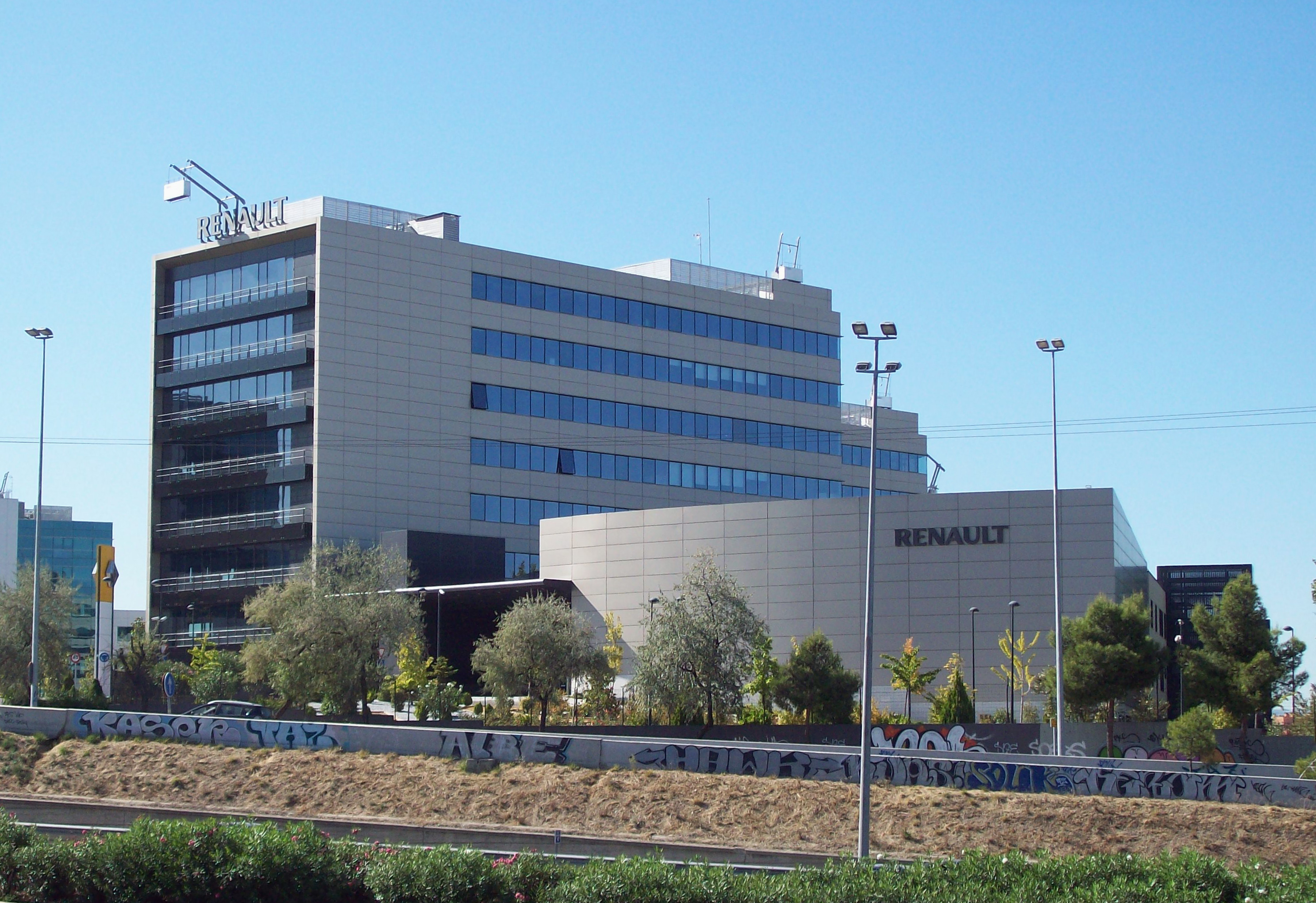
Former Renault España offices in Madrid

In 1950, a group of industrialists and businessmen led by Manuel Jiménez Alfaro, a military, and by Nicolás Franco, Francisco Franco's brother and ambassador in Portugal, requested to the Régie Nationale des Usines Renault (RNUR) a license to assemble Renault-branded vehicles in Spain. At the same time, the group presented the project to the Valladolid's Department of Industry, considering that location ideal for the new factory. However, the project depended on the approval of both the Spanish government and the French national company, something difficult at a time when the French-Spanish relationship was very damaged. At first, the Renault's President then, Pierre Lefaucheux, was opposed to the idea, but later he gave his support. As for the Spain government, the opposition came essentially from the fact that there was a project to create a state monopoly of the automotive industry through SEAT. Finally, all permissions were achieved in 1951.

The production of the new company, Fabricación de Automóviles Sociedad Anónima (FASA) begun in 1953, and it assembled units of the 4CV model. SAEAR continued in charge of sales. In 1955, the facilities were expanded to produce cars entirely at the Valladolid plant. During this time were introduced the Renault Dauphine and the 4. In 1965, the Renault sales subsidiary, which had changed its name to Renault España Sociedad Anónima (RESA) and FASA were merged to form FASA-Renault. Renault had a stake of 49.9% in the new company. That same year two new factories were opened: FACSA and FAMESA, the first was dedicated to manufacture of bodywork elements, and the second to manufacture mechanical parts. The company also purchases a factory in Sevilla, which was engaged in manufacturing gearboxes. In 1976, Renault became a major shareholder. In 1978 was completed the construction of a new factory in Palencia. The company's commercial and manufacturing branches were split again in 1994, when Renault created Renault España Comercial Sociedad Anómima (RECSA) to manage car sales.

In the year 2000 FASA-Renault became a wholly owned subsidiary of Renault, being called Renault España Sociedad Anónima.

In 2015, the Spanish National Commission on Markets and Competition fined Renault España Comercial, S.A. with over 18 million euros because it operated a cartel with other car builders and sellers controlling 91% of the Spanish market between 2006 and 2013. They shared information about sales and repairs anti-competitively.

In 2016, Renault sold 169,243 Renault and Dacia-badged cars in the Spanish market. In 2017, the company produced its 16,000,000th vehicle within Spain.

== Facilities ==
=== Administration ===
Renault España registered office is in Valladolid, but most of the management activities for the Renault group in Spain are made through its Madrid head offices.

=== Factories ===
==== Valladolid ====
===== Cars =====
The Valladolid car assembly plant, which comprises two buildings covering 31.4 hectares, As of 2014 produces the Captur, and the Twizy.

===== Engines =====
The Valladolid engine plant covers 14.5 hectares. It manufactured 1.57 million units in 2016.

==== Palencia ====
The Palencia plant covers 30.4 hectares. From July 2022, this plant produces the compact crossover SUV Renault Austral and from September 2023, the 7-seater SUV Renault Espace. From January 2024, this plant will produce the SUV-coupe' Renault Rafale.

==== Sevilla ====
The Sevilla plant manufactures gearboxes. It produced 1.07 million units in 2016.
