= Renault Rafale =

Mid-size crossover coupe SUV

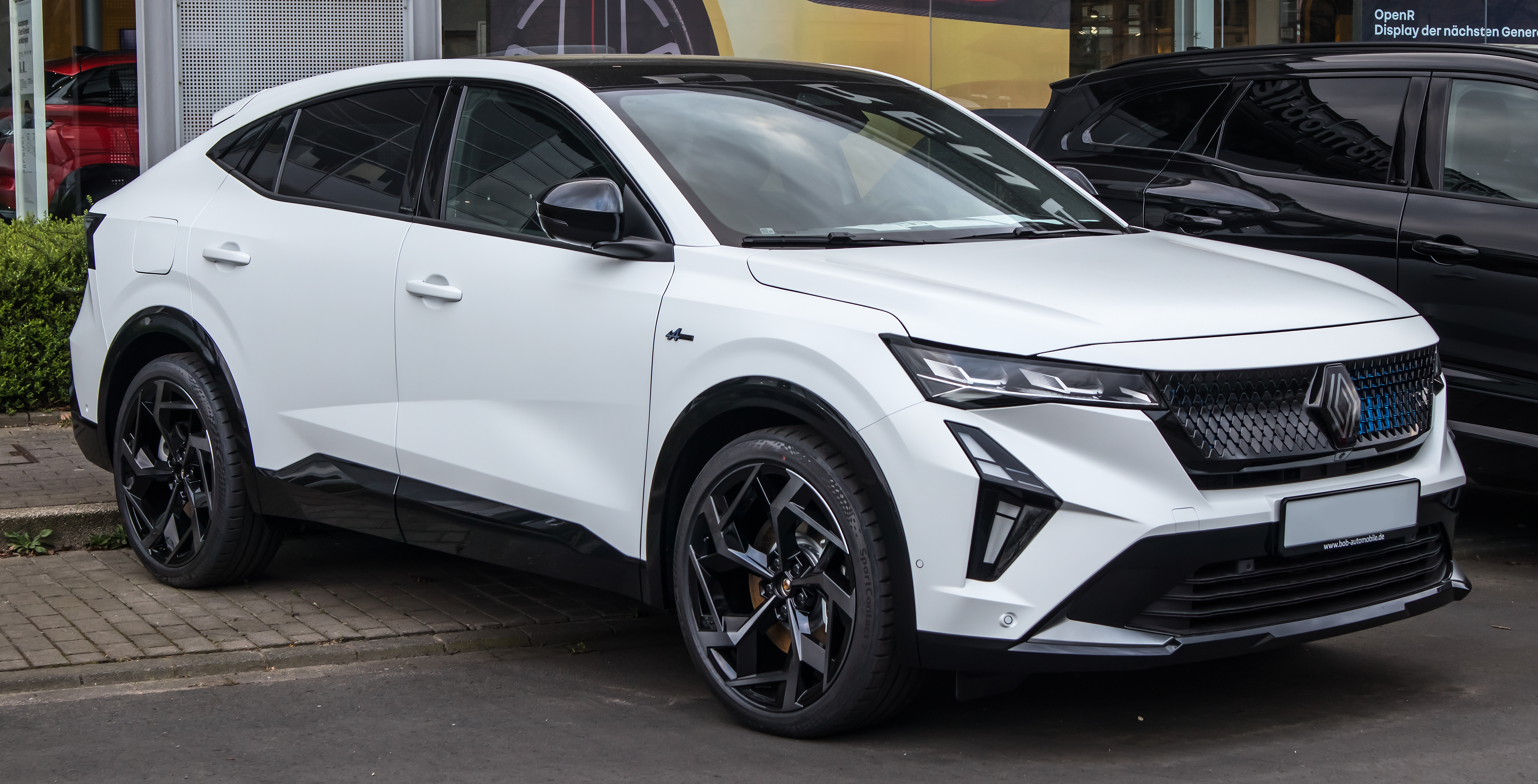
- Renault Rafale E-Tech PHEV Atelier Alpine

Overview
- Manufacturer: Renault
- Model code: DHN
- Production: 2024–present
- Assembly: Spain: Palencia (Renault España)
- Designer: Marco Brunori, Yang Fu, Pierre Sabas, Bertrand Grisard; Under the lead of Gilles Vidal

Body and chassis
- Class: Mid-size crossover SUV (D)
- Body style: 5-door coupe SUV
- Layout: Front-engine, front-wheel-drive (FHEV); Front-engine, all-wheel-drive (PHEV)
- Platform: Renault–Nissan CMF-CD
- Related: Renault Austral; Renault Espace

Powertrain
- Engine: Petrol hybrid: 1.2 L HR12 turbo I3
- Electric motor: 2× Permanent magnet motors (FHEV); 3× motors ( 2 in front with 1 rear 100 kW (134 hp; 136 PS) ePT-100); 25 kW (34 hp; 34 PS) HSG motor (PHEV only)
- Power output: 149 kW (200 hp; 203 PS) (E-Tech full hybrid 200); 224 kW (300 hp; 305 PS) (E-Tech 4×4)
- Transmission: 6-speed MultiMode automatic
- Hybrid drivetrain: Full hybrid (1.2 E-Tech); Plug-in hybrid (1.2 E-Tech 4x4)
- Battery: 400V, 2 kWh lithium-ion (FHEV); 400V, 22 kWh rechargeable (PHEV)

Dimensions
- Wheelbase: 2,740 mm (107.9 in)
- Length: 4,710 mm (185.4 in)
- Width: 1,866 mm (73.5 in)
- Height: 1,610 mm (63.4 in)
- Kerb weight: 1,653 kg (3,644 lb)

The Renault Rafale is a mid-size crossover SUV that has been produced by the French manufacturer Renault as a coupe SUV since 2024. Built upon the Renault–Nissan CMF-CD platform, it shares about 75 percent of its parts and design features with the SUV Espace and Austral models.

Codenamed 'DHN', the vehicle is the second coupe SUV produced by the brand after the Arkana compact crossover. In Renault's lineup, the vehicle is positioned between the Arkana and the slightly larger Espace VI.

The Rafale is named after the C.460 Rafale monoplane introduced in 1934 by the Caudron-Renault aviation company, although the name was also used more recently on the Dassault Rafale fighter jet.

== Overview ==
The vehicle is 4,710 mm (185 in) long, meaning it belongs to the British D-segment size segmentation, as well as the North American intermediate size class, and has full hybrid and plug-in hybrid powertrains.

The Rafale received a new plug-in hybrid powertrain with 300 hp (220 kW) and all-wheel drive by installing an electric motor at the rear. Despite being smaller than the Espace, the Rafale is still considered the flagship for the brand. The Renault Rafale E-Tech full hybrid version has an autonomy of 1,100 km with a full tank of petrol, according to WLTP data.

The Renault Rafale is equipped with the OpenR Link system and features an electrochromic panoramic glass roof, sold under the name Solarbay, on select models.

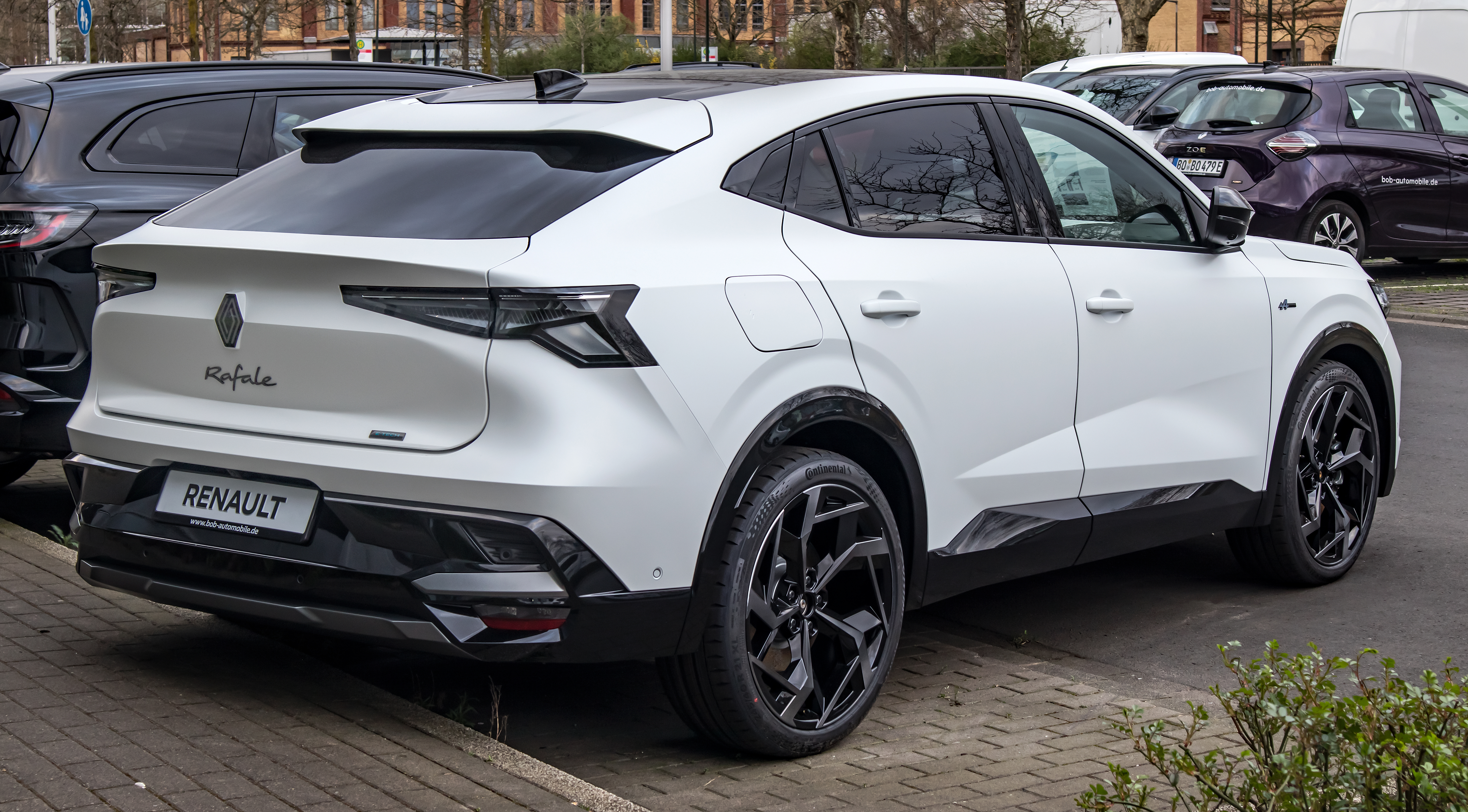
Rear view

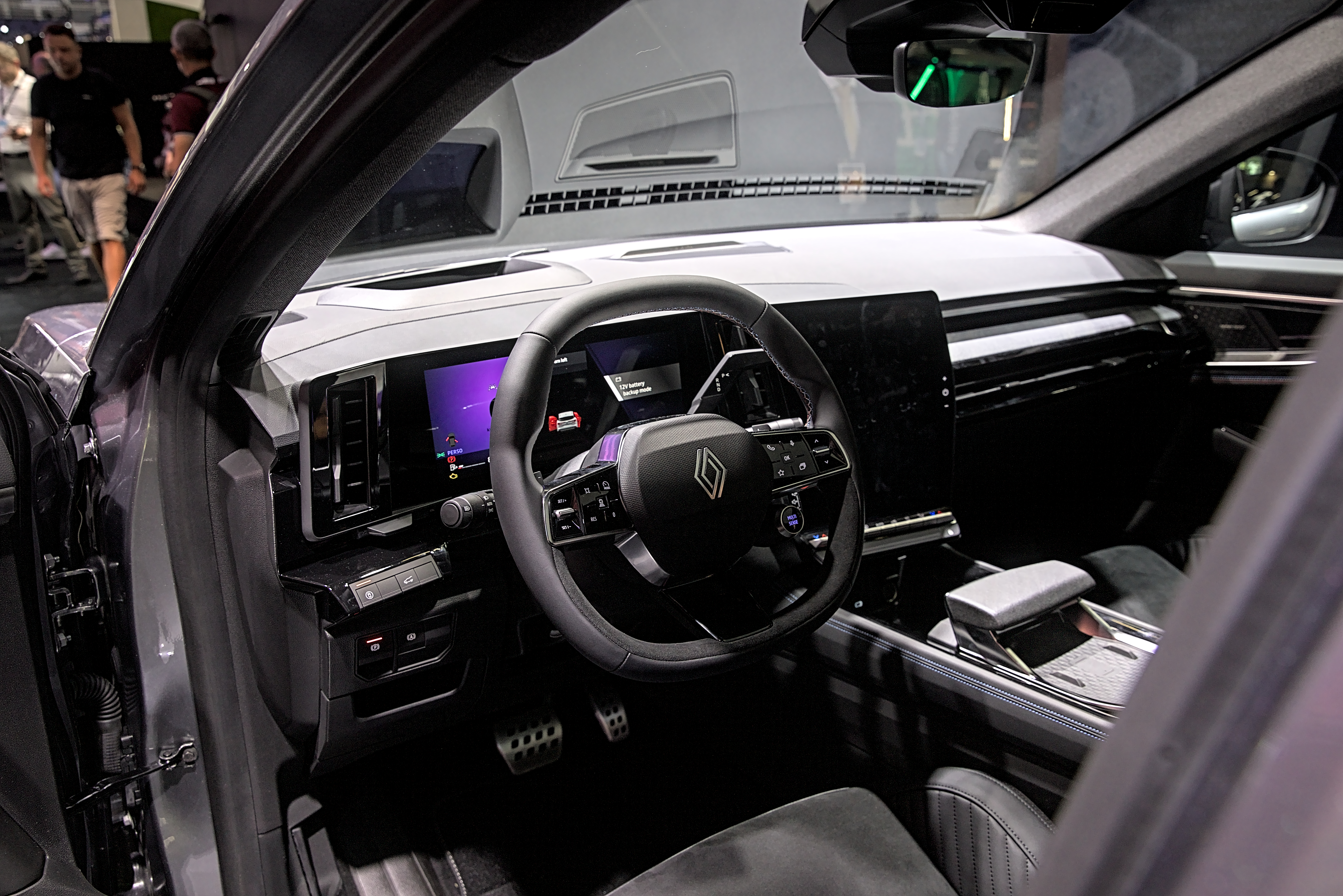
Interior

== Powertrain ==
Available in both full-hybrid and plug-in hybrid options, the full-hybrid model includes an engine and one traction motor at the front axle 50 kW (67 hp; 68 PS) for a FWD layout (combined output of 146 kW (196 hp; 199 PS)). An additional electric motor run only as a generator produces 25 kW (34 hp; 34 PS).

The PHEV model adds an electric rear axle (100 kW) for an AWD layout. The motors create a combined output of 224 kW (300 hp; 305 PS) and 450 N⋅m (45.9 kg⋅m; 332 lb⋅ft).

Type	Model	Engine code	Displacement	Power	Torque	Combined system output	Electric motor	Battery	Top speed	0–100 km/h (0–62 mph)	Transmission	Layout	Production
Petrol full hybrid	1.2 E-Tech	HR12	1,199 cc (73.2 in^{3}) I3 turbo	Engine: 96 kW (129 hp; 131 PS) Electric Motor: 50 kW (67 hp; 68 PS)	Engine: 205 N⋅m (20.9 kp⋅m; 151 lb⋅ft) Electric Motor: 205 N⋅m (20.9 kp⋅m; 151 lb⋅ft)	146 kW (196 hp; 199 PS)	-	400 V, 2 kWh lithium-ion	N/A	8.9	MultiMode automatic	FWD	
Petrol full hybrid	1.2 E-Tech	HR12	1,199 cc (73.2 in^{3}) I3 turbo	Engine: 96 kW (129 hp; 131 PS) Electric Motor: 50 kW (67 hp; 68 PS)	Engine: 205 N⋅m (20.9 kp⋅m; 151 lb⋅ft) Electric Motor: 205 N⋅m (20.9 kp⋅m; 151 lb⋅ft)	146 kW (196 hp; 199 PS)	-	400 V, 2 kWh lithium-ion	N/A	8.9	MultiMode automatic	FWD	2024–present
Petrol plug-in hybrid	1.2 E-Tech 4x4	HR12	1,199 cc (73.2 in^{3}) I3 turbo	Engine: 110 kW (148 hp; 150 PS) Motor 1: 50 kW (67 hp; 68 PS) Motor 2: 100 kW (134 hp; 136 PS)	Engine: 230 N⋅m (23.5 kp⋅m; 170 lb⋅ft) Motor 1: 205 N⋅m (20.9 kp⋅m; 151 lb⋅ft) Motor 2: 195 N⋅m (19.9 kp⋅m; 144 lb⋅ft)	224 kW (300 hp; 305 PS) / 450 N⋅m (45.9 kp⋅m; 332 lb⋅ft)	-	400 V, 22 kWh	210 km/h (130 mph)	6.4 s	Front: MultiMode automatic, Rear: Electric Rear Axle	AWD	
Petrol plug-in hybrid	1.2 E-Tech 4x4	HR12	1,199 cc (73.2 in^{3}) I3 turbo	Engine: 110 kW (148 hp; 150 PS) Motor 1: 50 kW (67 hp; 68 PS) Motor 2: 100 kW (134 hp; 136 PS)	Engine: 230 N⋅m (23.5 kp⋅m; 170 lb⋅ft) Motor 1: 205 N⋅m (20.9 kp⋅m; 151 lb⋅ft) Motor 2: 195 N⋅m (19.9 kp⋅m; 144 lb⋅ft)	224 kW (300 hp; 305 PS) / 450 N⋅m (45.9 kp⋅m; 332 lb⋅ft)	-	400 V, 22 kWh	210 km/h (130 mph)	6.4 s	Front: MultiMode automatic, Rear: Electric Rear Axle	AWD	2024–present
