= Former and lost communities in Markham =

Former and lost communities in Markham lists communities that have disappeared in Markham, Ontario, because they were renamed or no longer exist.

== Australia ==
Australia
- Neighbourhood
- Country: Canada
- Province: Ontario
- Regional municipality: York
- City: City of Markham
- Time zone: UTC-5 (EST)
  - Summer (DST): UTC-4 (EDT)
- Forward sortation area: L6B
- Area codes: 905 and 289

- Australia – located in the intersection of 19th Avenue and Ninth Line and namely centred on Lot 31 on Concession 9 on the farm once owned by William Holden. A tannery was the only notable business besides farming. The name was unofficial and not found on any maps during its existence in the mid-1800.
