= Australian =

Australian(s) may refer to:

== Australia ==
- Australia, a country
- Australians, citizens of the Commonwealth of Australia
  - European Australians
  - Anglo-Celtic Australians, Australians descended principally from British colonists
  - Aboriginal Australians, indigenous peoples of Australia as identified and defined within Australian law
- Australia (continent)
  - Indigenous Australians
- Australian English, the dialect of the English language spoken in Australia
- Australian Aboriginal languages
- The Australian, a newspaper
- Australiana, things of Australian origins

== Other uses ==
- Australian (horse), a racehorse
- Australian, British Columbia, an unincorporated community in Canada

== See also ==
- The Australian (disambiguation)
- Australia (disambiguation)
- Austrian (disambiguation)
