= The Australian (disambiguation) =

The Australian is a broadsheet newspaper published in Australia.

The Australian may also refer to:

== Other publications ==
- The Australian (1824 newspaper), newspaper published in Sydney between 1824 and 1848
- Australian Financial Review, financial newspaper
- The Australian Horror and Fantasy Magazine, magazine published between 1984 and 1986
- The Australian Journal of Physiotherapy, medical journal, now Journal of Physiotherapy
- The Australian Way, inflight magazine, see Qantas § Inflight magazine
- The Australian (Perth) 1907-1908) newspaper

== Other uses ==
- The Australian Advanced Air Traffic System (TAATS), the systems used by Airservices Australia for Air Traffic Control services
- The Australian Ballet Dance Company
- The Australian Golf Club
- The Australian Race, title of a book about Aboriginal Australians by Edward Micklethwaite Curr, published 1886
- The Australian/Vogel Literary Award Literary Award

== See also ==
- Australian (disambiguation)
