= Renault Austral =

Compact crossover SUV

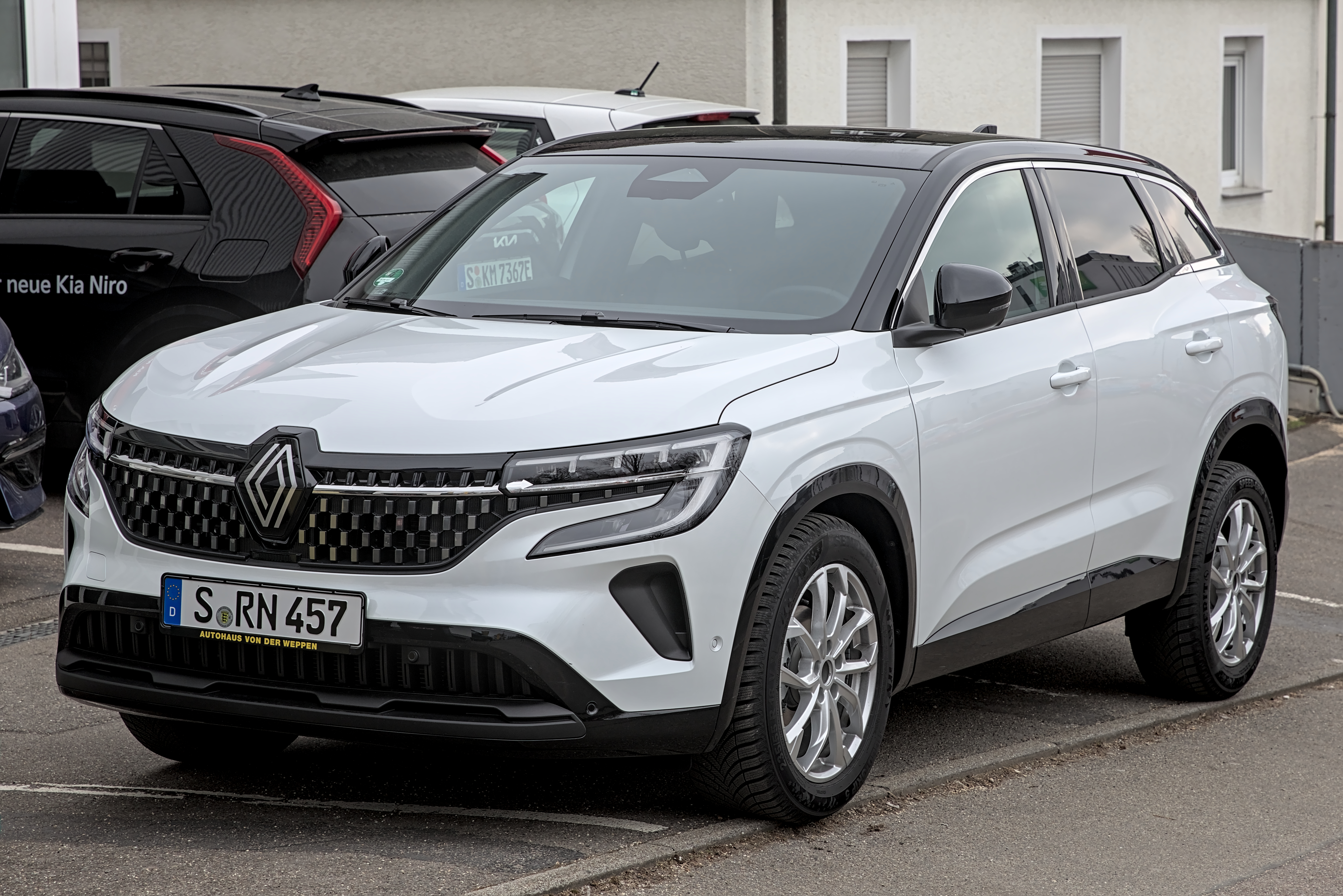

Overview
- Manufacturer: Renault
- Model code: HHN
- Also called: Renault Espace (LWB)
- Production: July 2022 – present
- Assembly: Spain: Palencia (Renault España)
- Designer: Michael Han, Marco Brunori, Pierre Sabas, Alexis Martot, Andrey Basmanov, Alan Derosier

Body and chassis
- Class: Compact crossover SUV (C)
- Body style: 5-door SUV
- Layout: Front-engine, front-wheel-drive
- Platform: Renault–Nissan CMF-CD
- Related: Renault Espace VI; Renault Rafale; Nissan Qashqai (J12)

Powertrain
- Engine: Petrol hybrid: 1.2 L HR12 I3 turbo mild hybrid; 1.2 L HR12 I3 turbo full hybrid (E-Tech Hybrid); 1.3 L H5Ht I4 turbo mild hybrid
- Electric motor: 67 hp (68 PS; 50 kW) (E-Tech Hybrid)
- Transmission: 6-speed manual; Multimode clutchless automatic hybrid transmission; X-Tronic CVT
- Hybrid drivetrain: Mild hybrid; Power-split (E-Tech Hybrid)
- Battery: 12V (1.3 mild hybrid); 48V (1.2 mild hybrid); 400V (1.2 full hybrid)

Dimensions
- Wheelbase: 2,667 mm (105.0 in)
- Length: 4,510 mm (177.6 in)
- Width: 1,825 mm (71.9 in)
- Height: 1,644 mm (64.7 in)
- Kerb weight: 1,421–1,517 kg (3,133–3,344 lb)

Chronology
- Predecessor: Renault Kadjar; Renault Koleos (for Espace, Europe); Renault Grand Scénic (for Espace, Europe)

The Renault Austral is a compact crossover SUV (C-segment) manufactured and marketed by Renault. It was unveiled in March 2022 as a successor to the Kadjar, and built on the third-generation CMF-CD platform. It was publicly exhibited for the first time at the 2022 Paris Motor Show. Production began in July 2022 in Spain at the Palencia plant.

Its derivatives include the sixth-generation Renault Espace, a long-wheelbase family-oriented version of the Renault Austral with three-row seating, and the Renault Rafale, a coupé SUV. The three vehicles are sharing 75 percent of their parts.

== Overview ==
The "Austral" name was derived from the Latin word "australis", and has been trademarked since 2005.

The Austral has the new retro-inspired Renault logo that debuted on the Mégane E-Tech, has full-LED headlights using Renault's C-shaped signature daytime running lights, and boomerang-shaped LED taillights joins the logo on either side of the tailgate. The Austral adopts Renault's new design, called Sensual Tech.

According to Agneta Dahlgren, Renault design project director, "the result is materialized by the combination of generous shapes, curved shoulders, projecting sides and the integration of subtle technical details such as high-tech headlamps. which reinforce its identity design”.

The dashboard of the Austral, called OpenR (Google with openR Link), is largely inspired by that of the Mégane E-Tech, but the layout is slightly revised.

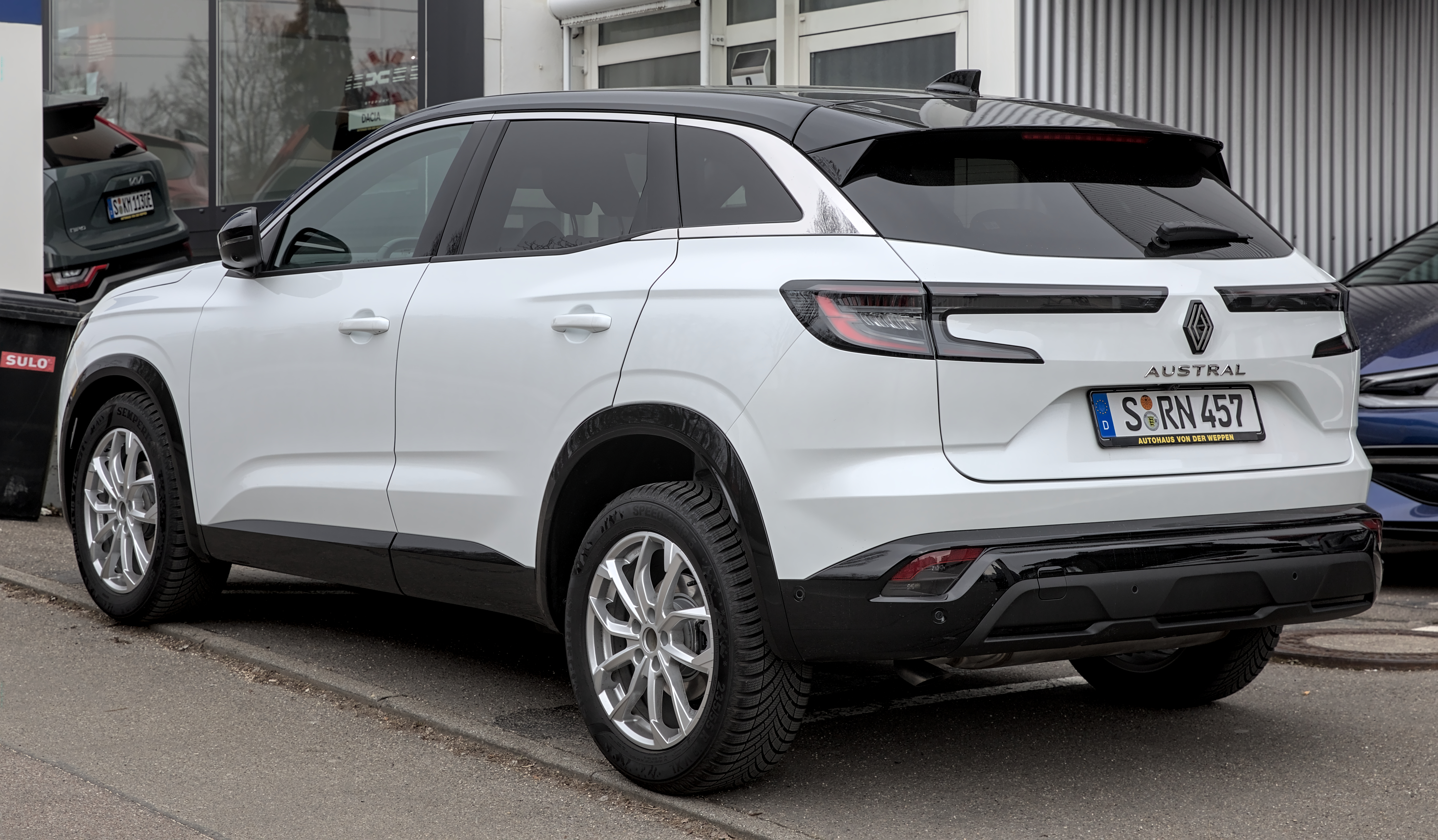
Rear view

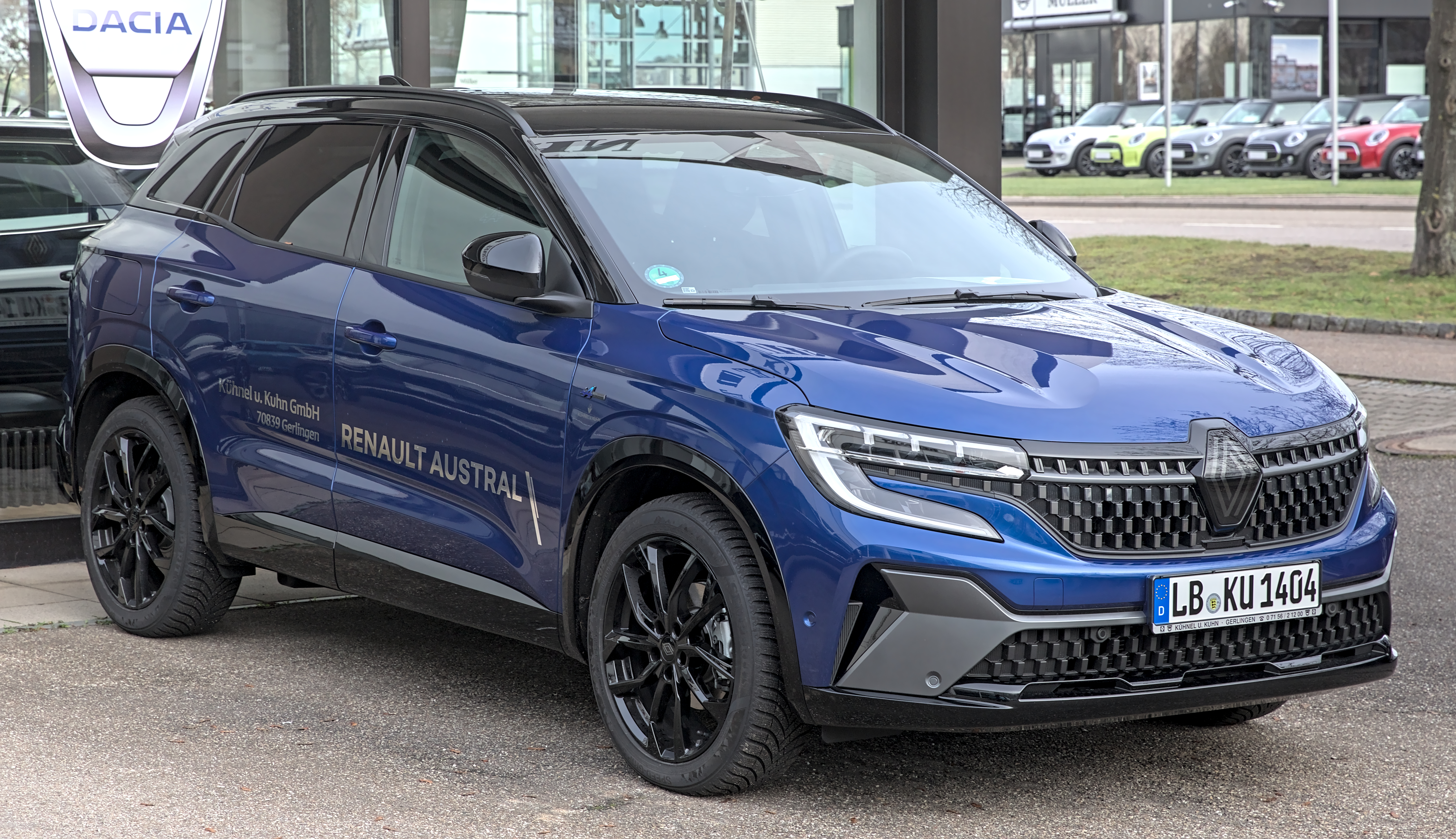
Austral Esprit Alpine

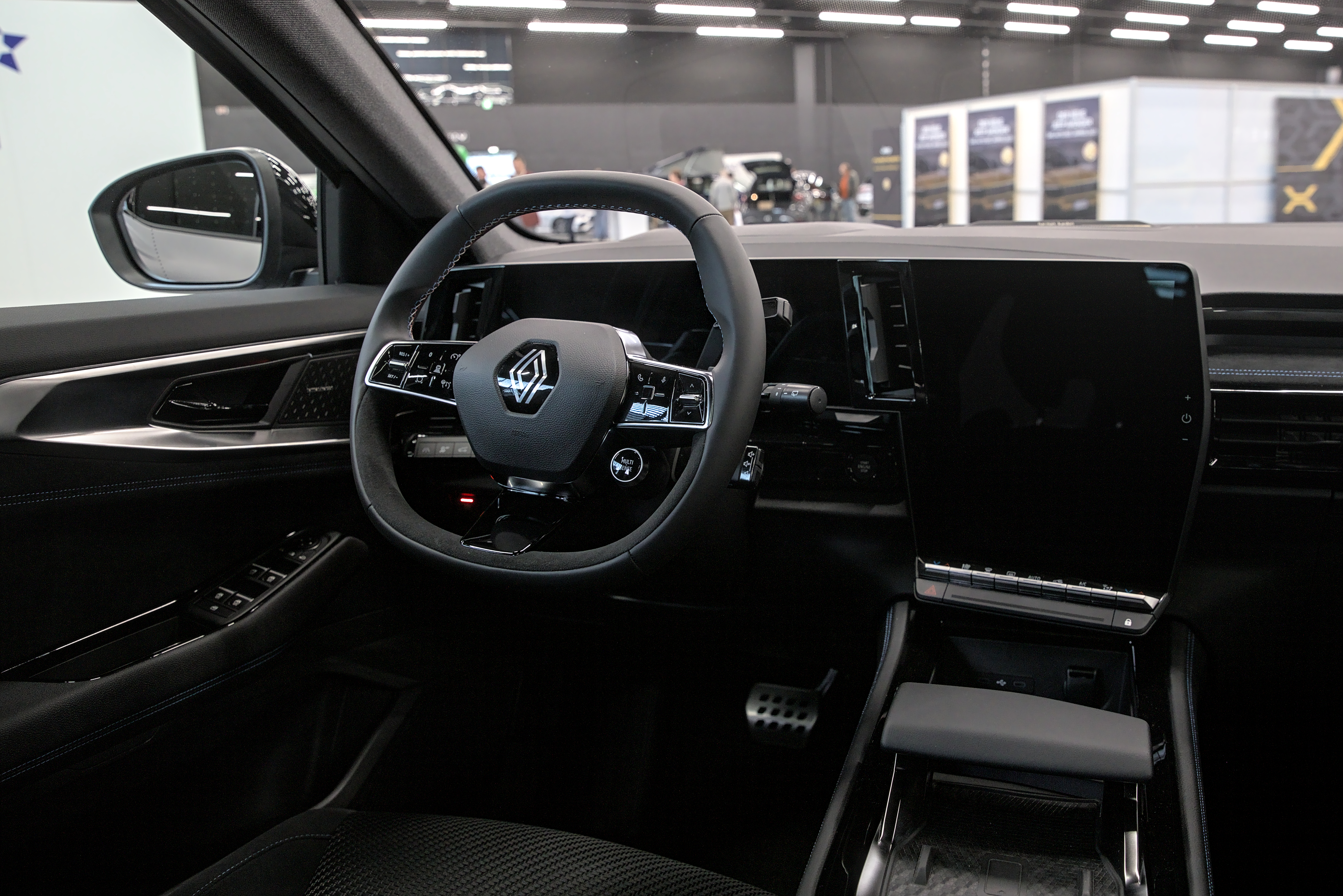
Interior

== Facelift ==
The facelifted Austral was revealed on 2 April 2025. The model adopts a similar front end to the Renault Rafale as well as new seats, a brand new hood, new tailgate, new door seals, and new rear lights.

Renault launched the facelifted Austral in the Egyptian markets on December 23, 2025.

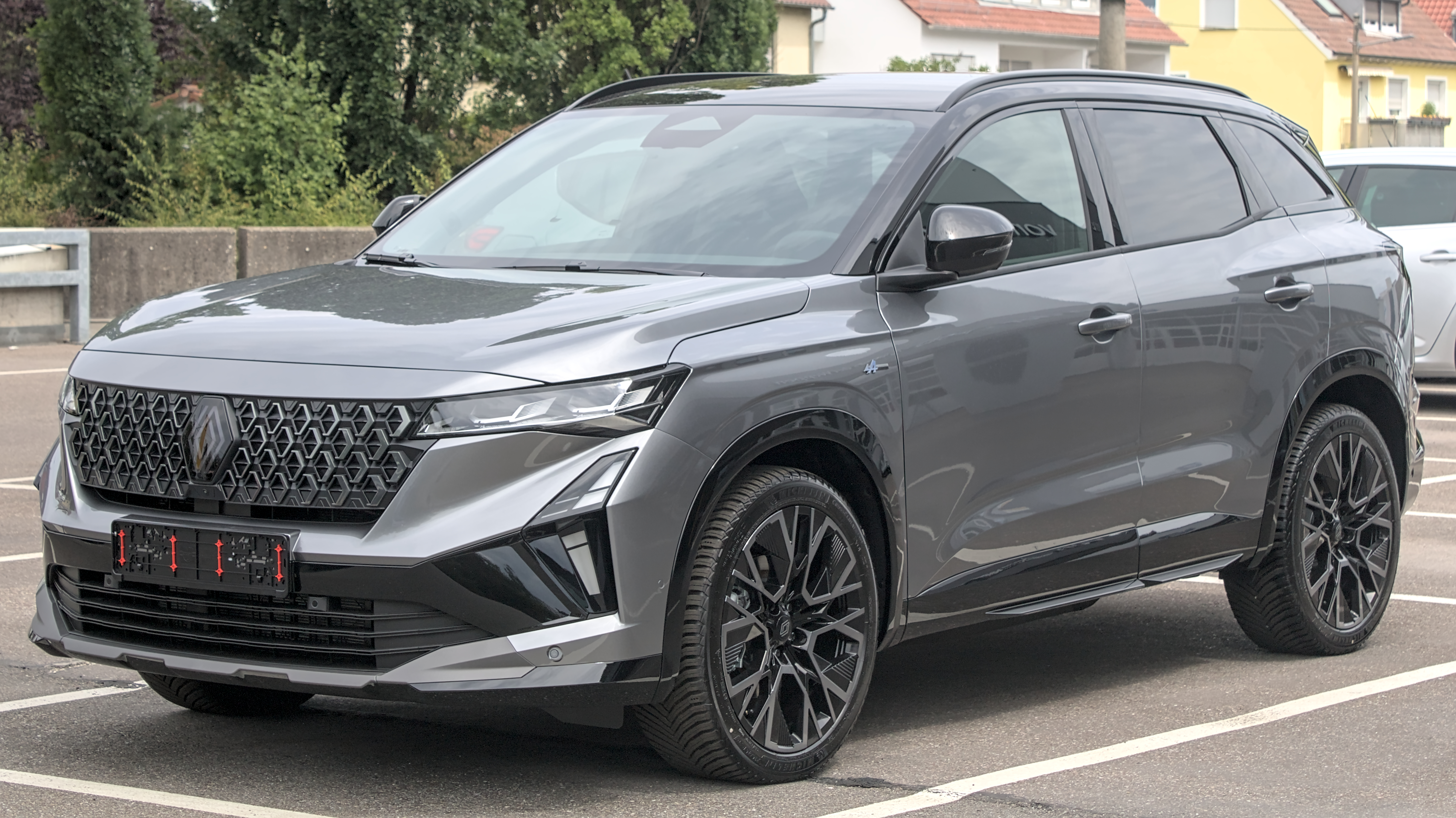
Facelift Austral (front)

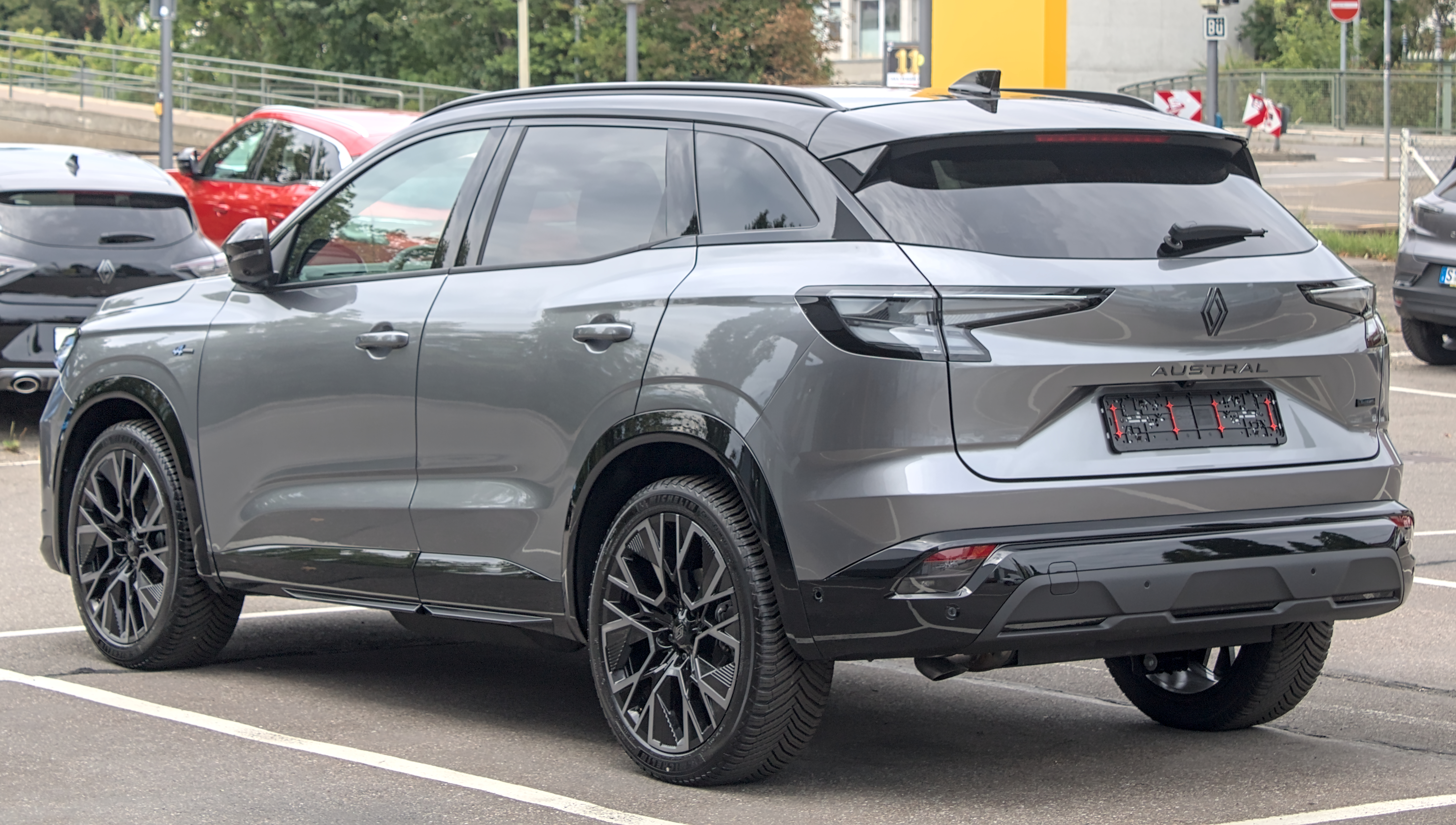
Facelift Austral (rear)

== Powertrain ==
Model	Code	Type	Displacement	Power	Torque	Transmission	Battery	Top speed	0–100 km/h (0–62 mph)	Fuel consumption	CO_{2} emissions	Notes
Petrol
1.3 Mild Hybrid 12V	H5Ht	I4 turbo	1333 cc	140 hp (142 PS; 104 kW)	260 N⋅m (26.5 kg⋅m; 192 lb⋅ft)	6-speed manual X-Tronic CVT	12V Lithium-ion	175 km/h (109 mph)	10.7 s	6.2 L/100 km (16.1 km/l; 45.6 mpg_{‑imp}; 37.9 mpg_{‑US})	139–142 g/km (7.9–8.1 oz/mi)	Euro 6d compliant
1.3 Mild Hybrid 12V	H5Ht	I4 turbo	1333 cc	160 hp (162 PS; 119 kW)	270 N⋅m (27.5 kg⋅m; 199 lb⋅ft) at 1800 rpm	X-Tronic CVT	12V Lithium-ion	175 km/h (109 mph)	9.7 s	6.2–6.3 L/100 km (16.1–15.9 km/l; 45.6–44.8 mpg_{‑imp}; 37.9–37.3 mpg_{‑US})	141–142 g/km (8.0–8.1 oz/mi)	Euro 6d compliant
1.2 Mild Hybrid Advanced 48V	HR12	I3 turbo	1199 cc	130 hp (132 PS; 97 kW)	205 N⋅m (20.9 kg⋅m; 151 lb⋅ft)	6-speed manual	48V Lithium-ion	175 km/h (109 mph)	8.4 s	5.3 L/100 km (18.9 km/l; 53.3 mpg_{‑imp}; 44.4 mpg_{‑US})	123 g/km (7.0 oz/mi)	Euro 6d compliant
Petrol hybrid
1.2 E-Tech Full Hybrid	HR12	I3 turbo	1199 cc	200 hp (203 PS; 149 kW)	ICE engine: 205 N⋅m (20.9 kg⋅m; 151 lb⋅ft); Electric motor: 205 N⋅m; Combined: 410 N⋅m (41.8 kg⋅m; 302 lb⋅ft)	Multimode clutchless automatic hybrid transmission	400V Lithium-ion, 1.7 kWh		8.4 s	4.7 L/100 km (21.3 km/l; 60.1 mpg_{‑imp}; 50.0 mpg_{‑US})	105–106 g/km (6.0–6.0 oz/mi)	

== Safety ==
Euro NCAP test results Renault Austral 1.3 TCe (LHD) (2022)
Test	Points	%
Overall:	5 /5 stars	
Adult occupant:	33.6	88%
Child occupant:	40.7	83%
Pedestrian:	37.7	69%
Safety assist:	13.9	87%

== Related models ==
=== Renault Espace ===
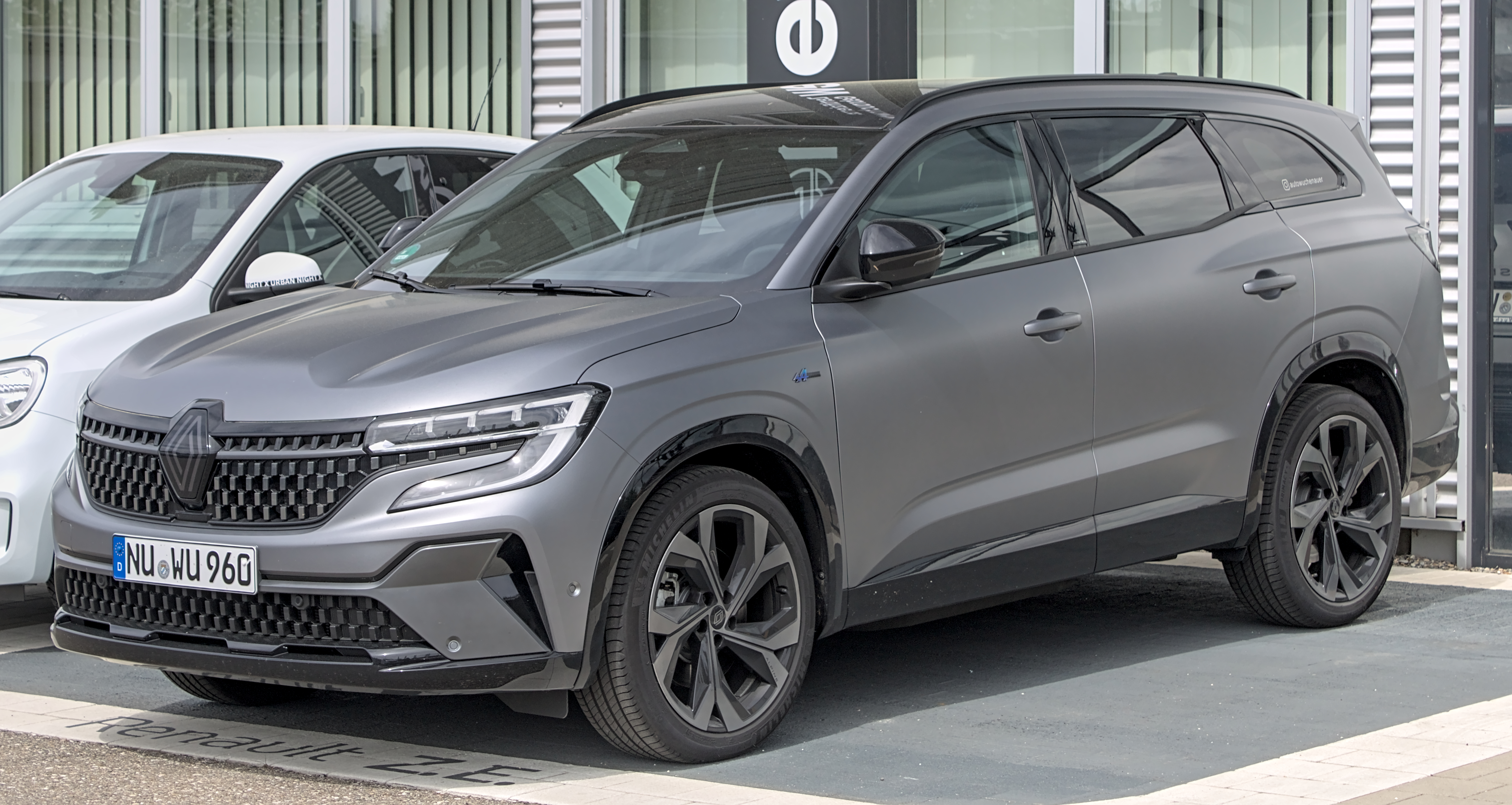
Renault Espace

Unveiled on March 28, 2023, the sixth-generation Espace is heavily based on the Austral, sharing most of the body panels including the front end.

It features an extended wheelbase and is available in five and seven-seater versions. It is 140 mm (5.5 in) shorter in length and 215kg lighter than the previous generation.

The Renault Espace orders started in spring 2023, and is produced at the Palencia plant in Spain alongside the mechanically-related Austral and the Rafale. However, it will not be available in the UK market.

=== Renault Rafale ===
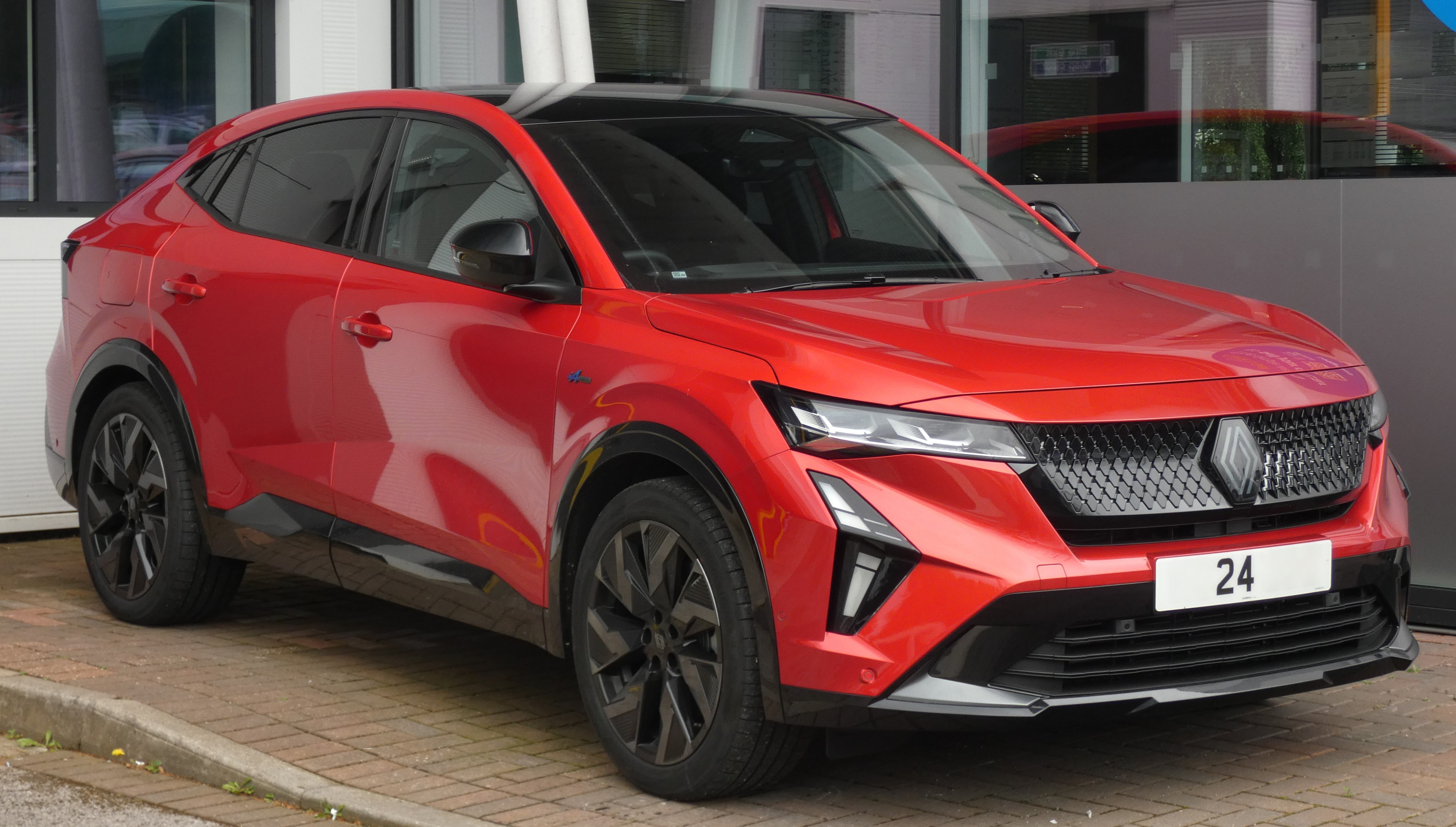
Renault Rafale

The Rafale (codenamed DHN) is a coupe SUV unveiled on June 18, 2023 at the 54th Paris Air Show in Le Bourget.

While sharing the CMF-CD underpinnings with its Austral and Espace counterparts, it features a distinctive design with unique body panels, being the brand's first production vehicle designed entirely according to the new visual language penned by Gilles Vidal.

The Rafale is named after the C.460 Rafale monoplane introduced in 1934 by the Caudron-Renault aviation company, although the name was also used more recently on the Dassault Rafale fighter jet. The car received a new plug-in hybrid powertrain with 300 hp (304 PS; 224 kW) and all-wheel drive by installing an electric motor at the rear.

== Awards ==
The Renault Austral received the Autobest 2023 trophy, awarded by a jury from 31 European countries.
