= Austral (1881) =

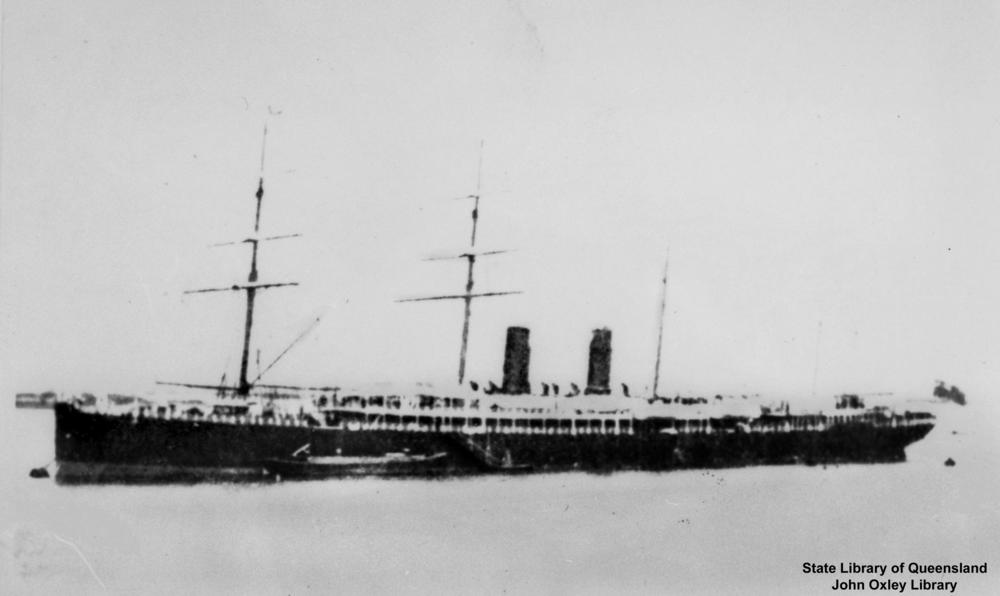
- Austral

History
- Name: Austral
- Owner: Orient Steam Navigation Company, Glasgow
- Builder: John Elder & Co., Govan
- Yard number: 245
- Launched: 21 December 1881
- Fate: Broken up at Genoa in 1903.

General characteristics
- Tonnage: 5524 grt, 5588 after refit
- Displacement: 9,500 long tons (9,700 t)
- Length: 470 feet (140 m)
- Depth: 37 feet (11 m)
- Installed power: 9,000 horsepower (6,700 kW)

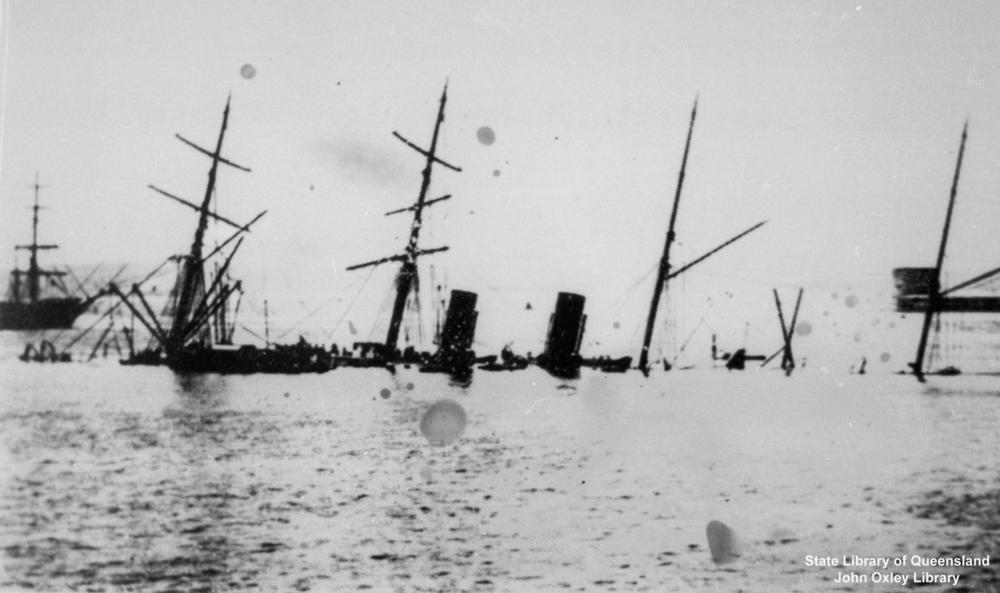
Austral settled on the bottom of Sydney Harbour in November 1882.

Austral was a passenger ship built by John Elder & Co., Govan and launched on 21 December 1881 for the Orient Steam Navigation Company, Glasgow. She was used in the passenger route trade to Australia.

She sank at her mooring in Neutral Bay, off Kirribilli Point in Sydney Harbour on 11 November 1882. Five crew were killed in the incident. The ship was refloated on 1 March 1883. She subsequently sailed to Glasgow for refit.

She was chartered to Anchor Line for 7 months during 1884 for the Liverpool to New York passenger route arriving back at Neutral Bay in 1885.

== Fate ==
Austral arrived for breaking up at Genoa on 27 May 1903.
