= Austral Picture Theatre =

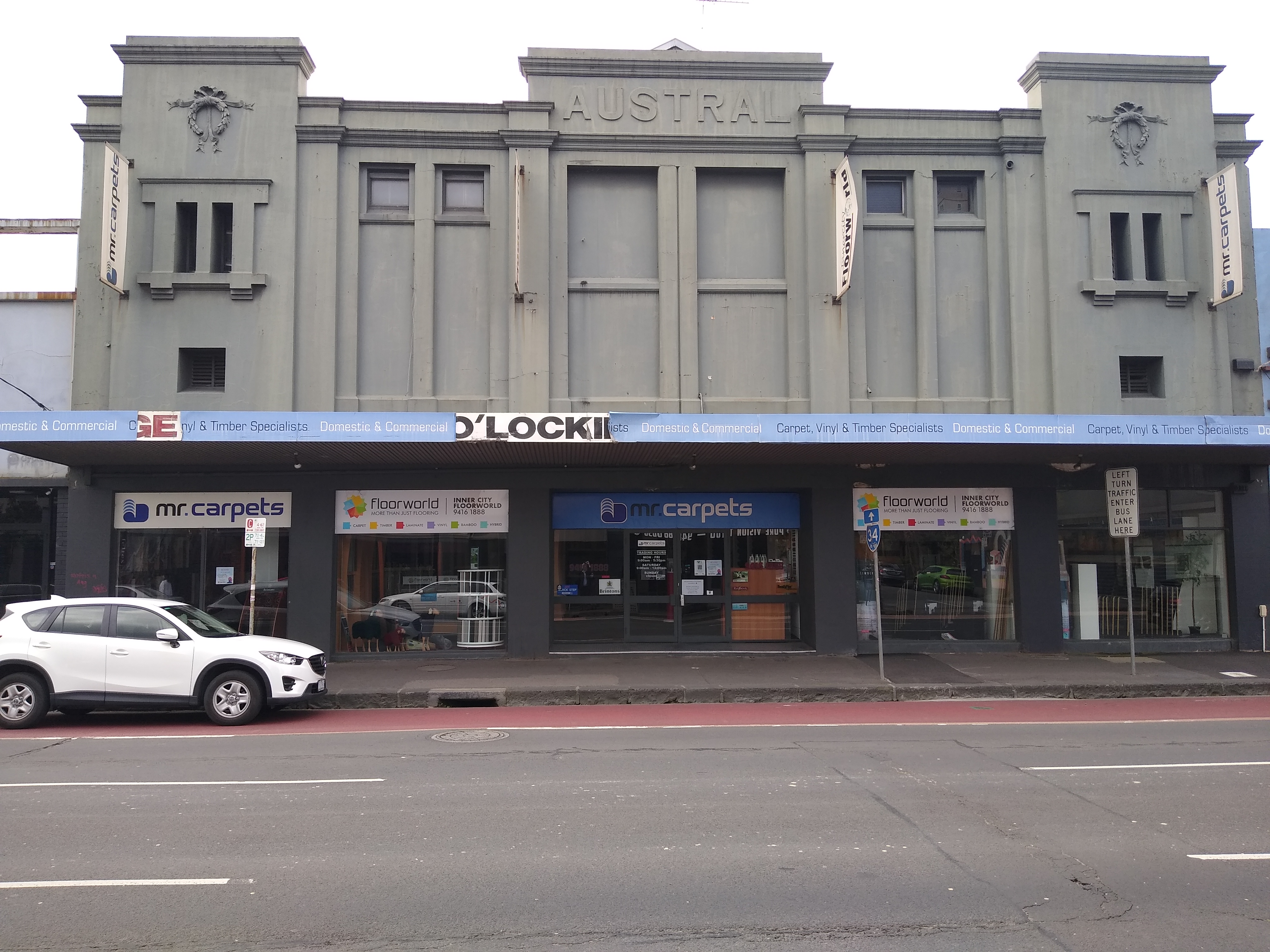
- Austral Picture Theatre in 2021
- Interactive map of the Austral Picture Theatre area

General information
- Type: Former theatre
- Location: 200 Johnston Street, Collingwood, Victoria
- Coordinates: 37°47′58.6″S 144°59′29.7″E

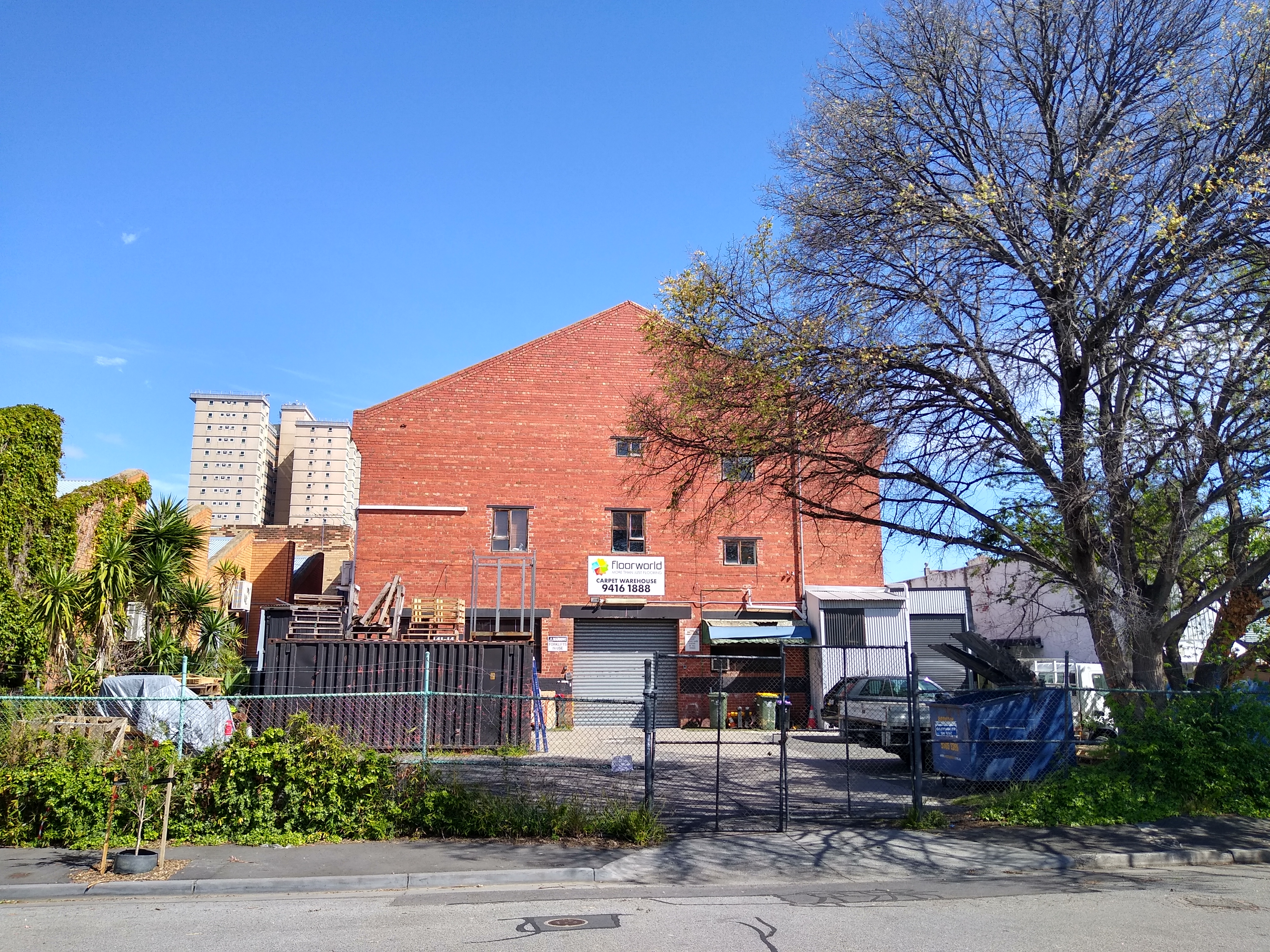
Rear of the Austral Picture Theatre building showing the elm tree on its right.

The Austral Picture Theatre was a theatre and cinema built in Collingwood, Victoria, Australia. It opened in 1921 as a theatre and later became a roller skate rink. There are plans to partially demolish the building to make way for apartments.

== History ==
The theatre was formally opened on 15 September 1921 by the Mayor of Collingwood, Cr. Walter G. Amos. A jazz orchestra played music, and two films, Dady-Long-Legs and The Diamond Queen, were shown.

The building was owned by Winifred Kenny, and operated by Robert McLeish, who also leased several other theatres such as The Rivoli. By 1922 the business was reported as "booming", and the following year The Austral won second prize in a competition for lobby display, losing out to The Prince of Wales Theatre, Perth.

The Austral building was run as a cinema until at least the late 1930s, and had a partnership with Hoyt's Theatres. The cinema had one screen and was said to seat 1600 patrons when it first opened, though this number appears to have fluctuated over the years, and was just over 1400 in 1953.

In 1953, Robert McLeish died, and on 29 July 1959 the cinema closed and was converted into the Austral Super Stall Market. Later in the 1970s the building was used as a roller skate rink, and in 1975 the building was placed for sale for $200,000. It was still available January the following year, and was then put up for auction in 1976, and again in 1988, and 1990. From 2003 the Austral building was the home of a carpet store Mr Carpets / Inner City Floorworld.

In 2019 Mr Carpets Floorworld sold the site for a reported $8 million to developer DPG who announced plans to turn the site into apartments.

The new building, designed by Jackson Clements Burrows Architects, was originally planned as an 11-storey apartment complex which would retain the original theatres facade, but would have removed an 80 year old Dutch elm tree from the rear of the property. These plans were met with considerable pushback from local residents, but were tentatively approved by Yarra City Council in September 2021. Although the building is considered "significant" by Heritage Victoria it is not protected.

On 26 September 2026, a fire broke out in the building.
