= John Gordon (songwriter) =

- Born: 1963 (age 62–63)
- Origin: Allora, Queensland, Australia
- Genres: Adult contemporary, Folk, Pop rock
- Occupations: Singer-songwriter, record producer
- Years active: 1989–present
- Website: www.johngordon.com.au

John Joseph Gordon (born 25 December 1963) is a songwriter from Queensland, Australia. In late 2010, he released the controversial climate change protest song "Australia (Whore of the world)" – which lambasts Australia's continuing coal exports, and open slather approach to mining in general. He has released three albums, Notre Dame (2007), Alive in Bornheim (2009) and Souvenir (2010) – the latter two were recorded in Frankfurt, Germany – and is perhaps best known for his song "Inexorably Yours" which was covered by songstress Wendy Matthews on her 1994 multi-platinum album Lily.

== Discography ==
*Souvenir (2010)
1. Let The Sunshine
2. Emily
3. Souvenir
4. Small Town Vignette
5. Gettin' Out Finally
6. MS
7. Sycamore
8. Craver of Security
9. Mystral Wind Over Dubrovnik
10. Valiant Lady
11. Theys Goodbye

*Alive in Bornheim
1. rooftop conversation pt1
2. In a Strange Country
3. Time Will Tell
4. Alive in Bornheim
5. Moonsong
6. White Dove Sail
7. Evidently (Her letter to me)
8. Turn Me Around
9. Kiss of Life
10. Seein' it Through
11. Whatever It Takes
12. Holy War
13. rooftop conversation pt2

*Notre Dame
1. Labour 2. Inexorably Yours 3. Notre Dame 4. Iris May 5. Religion 6. Notre Dame 2 7. baby come back (bonus)
