= Austral (automobile) =

The Austral was a French automobile manufactured in Paris in 1907; the company offered "touring tricars" and motorized delivery tricycles.
