= Australia (Whore of the World) =

Song by John Gordon
- Written: 2010
- Released: 2010
- Songwriter: John Gordon

"Australia (Whore of the World)" is a climate change protest song written by singer-songwriter John Gordon and released in late 2010. The song laments Australia's mining culture – especially coal mining in Australia and coal exports – likening the country to a 'mining whore'.

It has featured in a wide variety of Australian press and online media, including mining forums, and continues to garner attention due to its controversial and provocative message. Music press have hailed the song as one of the great contemporary Australian protest songs. The Melbourne Age went as far as to say that Midnight Oil's 'Blue Sky Mine' has nothing on 'Australia (Whore of the World)'. The song was banned by ABC Local Radio Southern Queensland (Australian Broadcasting Corporation) as being too provocative for a conservative audience. ABC Southern Queensland encompasses the Toowoomba and Darling Downs region, which is the region where Gordon hails from originally and where he has performed the song at a number of anti-mining rallies. The song received airplay in other parts of Australia from the ABC, and has been showcased on the national flagship ABC Environment website. In May 2011, Gordon contested the Toowoomba ruling, the case currently going before the independent ABC Consumer and Audience review board, to no avail.

"Australia (Whore of the World)" was recorded using only pump organ (harmonium) and guitar as vocal accompaniment. The song was written in the Ngaanyatjarra lands of Western Australia where Gordon worked in music production and development.
