= Austral Airlines =

Austral Airlines may refer to:

- Air Austral, the flag carrier of La Réunion.
- Austral Líneas Aéreas, defunct Argentinian airline operating domestic services.
