= The Australian (Perth) =

Former newspaper in Perth, Western Australia

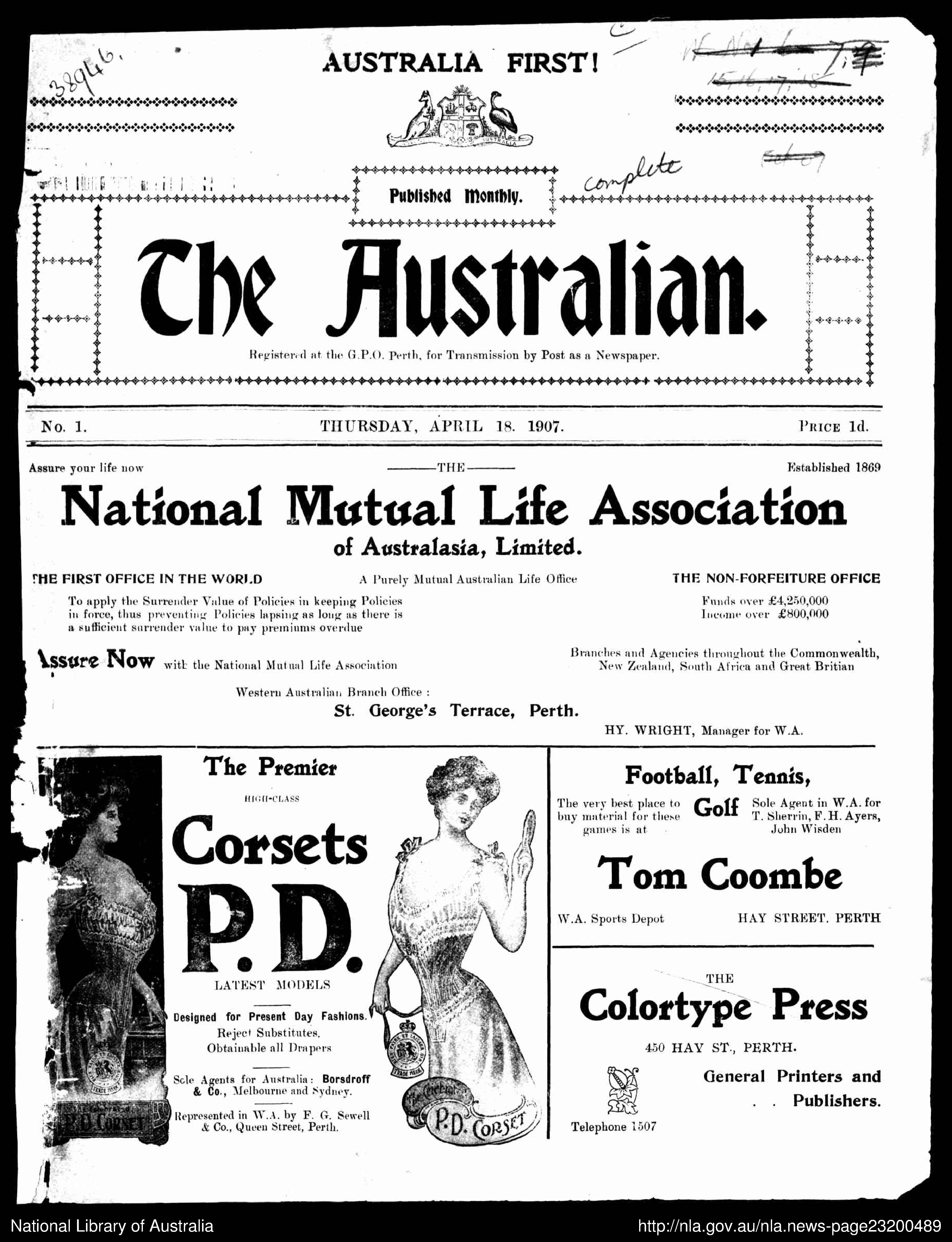
- The front page of the first issue of The Australian, published on 18 April 1907
- Founder(s): A.H O'Connor, H. Hornby
- Publisher: Australian Natives' Association
- Founded: 1907
- Ceased publication: 1908
- Political alignment: Liberal
- Language: English
- City: Perth
- Country: Western Australia

The Australian is a defunct English language newspaper that was published monthly in Perth, Western Australia, between 1907 and 1908 under the patronage of the Australian Natives' Association (ANA).

== History ==
The Australian was first published on 18 April 1907 by The Colortype Press, printers and publishers in Hay Street, for the proprietors A.H. O'Connor and H. Hornby of the Western Australian branch of the Australian Natives' Association. The newspaper served to support the ANA's nationalistic aims including the advancement of the Commonwealth, protectionism, compulsory military training, the development of a strong home naval program, and the maintenance of the White Australia policy.

The Australian encouraged the consumption of Australian products and contained articles on manufacturing, politics, literature reviews, artistic submissions as well as ANA events including meetings and conference proceedings.

== Availability ==
Issues of The Australian (1907–1908) have been digitised as part of the Australian Newspapers Digitisation Program, a project of the National Library of Australia in cooperation with the State Library of Western Australia.

Hard copy and microfilm copies of The Australian are also available at the State Library of Western Australia.

== See also ==
- List of newspapers in Australia
- List of newspapers in Western Australia
