= Australia (schooner) =

Schooner

Coordinates: 41°21′45″N 71°57′55″W

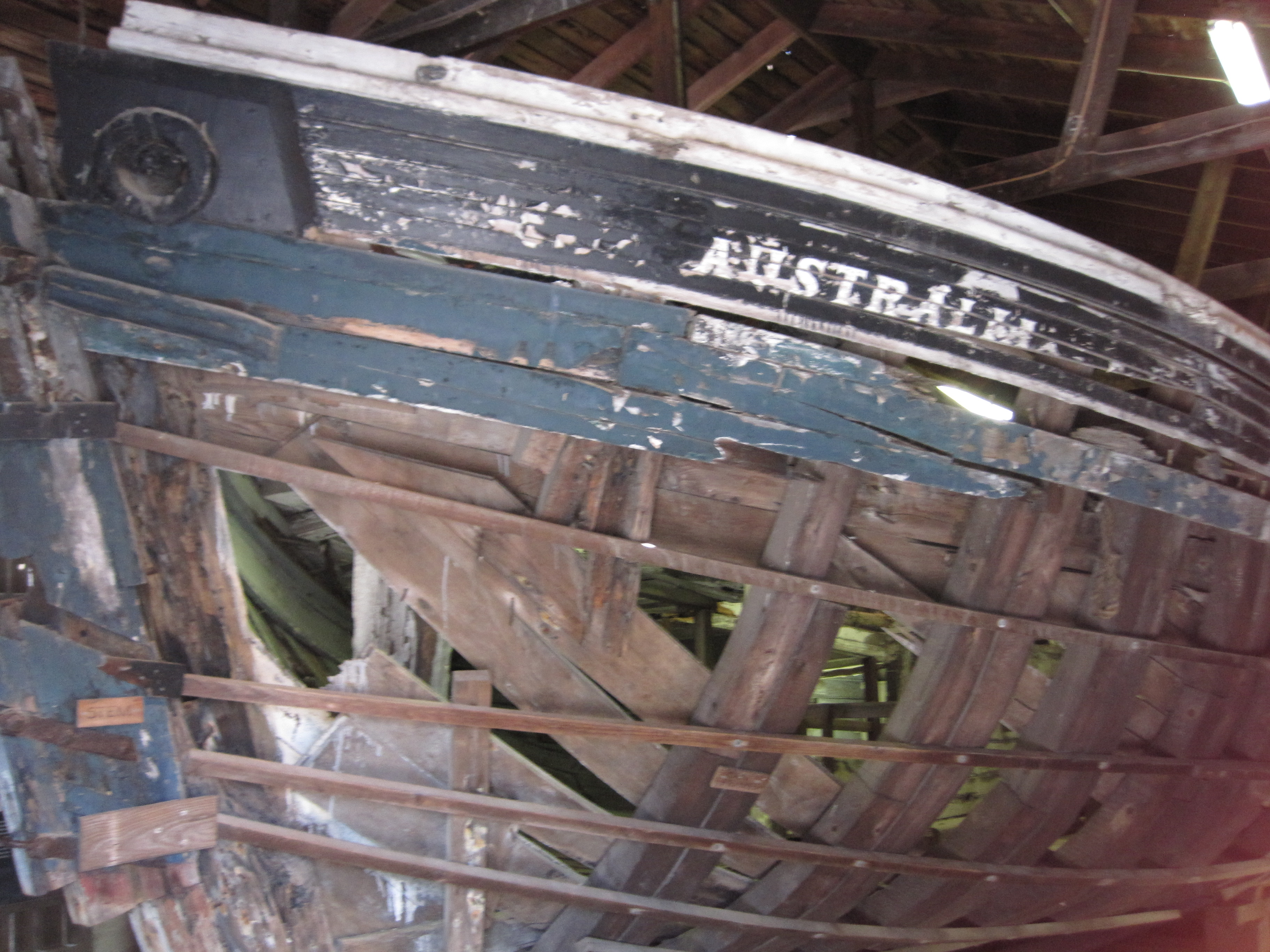

History

United States
- Completed: 1862
- In service: 1862
- Out of service: 1962
- Fate: Scrapped

General characteristics
- Length: 70 ft 7 in (21.51 m)
- Sail plan: Schooner

Australia was a coasting schooner located at Mystic Seaport in Mystic, Connecticut, United States. Australia was built in 1862 in Great South Bay, Long Island, New York and was originally named Alma. Australia was designed to carry freight and to be able to traverse shallow water. Australia was used as a Confederate blockade runner during the American Civil War until she was captured by Union warships and sold at auction. Mystic Seaport acquired her in 1951 for use as a training vessel. In 1962 Australia was hauled out for restoration but damage to the hull was deemed too extensive and the vessel was permanently beached. Australia was housed in a shed and used as an exhibit on ship construction, until she was scrapped in the late 2010s. The building is now being used for another purpose.

Around December 28, 1874 "Henry Evans, sailor of schr Australia, crashed to death between the tug and vessel at Muskegon." in Michigan.

== See also ==
- List of schooners
