= Renault Arkana (disambiguation) =

Renault Arkana is the name given to two vehicles with similar appearance but with different chassis and markets:

- Renault Arkana (Russia), produced in Russia on the basis of the Dacia Duster II for the local market from 2019 and exported to certain neighboring countries
- Renault Arkana (Europe), produced in South Korea on the basis of the Renault Clio V, by Samsung Motors under the name Samsung XM3 for the local market from 2020, then for Europe in 2021 under the Renault brand
