= Jérôme Stoll =

- Born: Jérôme Xavier Stoll; 8 March 1954 (age 72); Tunis
- Education: ESCP Business School

Jérôme Xavier Stoll (born 8 March 1954) is a top executive in the French auto industry, who has previously held the positions of deputy executive director of performance for the Renault Group, commercial director and president of Renault Sport.

== Career ==
Stoll joined Renault Industrial Vehicles in 1980, heading Berliet Nigeria from 1983 to 1987, then joined the Renault Group's financial department, before becoming administrative and financial director of Renault Automation in 1989. He was appointed industrial purchasing director in 1995. then Director of Mechanical Purchasing in 1998.

From 2000 to 2006, he served as CEO of Renault Samsung Motors before becoming Director of Mercosur, Chairman of Renault do Brasil and member of the Renault Group Management Committee.

In 2009, he was appointed Group Sales and Commercial Vehicles Director and, in 2012, was appointed to the management of Renault Retail Group. In 2013, he became Deputy General Manager for Performance.

On December 15, 2020, it was announced that Stoll, who had been president of Renault Sport since 2016, would step down at the end of the year 2020.
