= Renault Korea =

South Korean car manufacturer

Renault Korea Co., Ltd.

- Renault Korea logo since 2024
- Native name: 르노코리아 주식회사
- Formerly: Samsung Motors, Inc.; Renault Samsung Motors Co., Ltd.; Renault Korea Motors Co., Ltd.
- Type: Subsidiary
- Industry: Automotive
- Founded: 1995; 31 years ago
- Headquarters: Busan, South Korea
- Key people: Nicolas Paris (CEO)
- Products: SUVs
- Production output: 168,622 (2022)
- Revenue: ▲ ₩4,861.96 billion (2022)
- Operating income: ▲ ₩184.79 billion (2022)
- Net income: ▲ ₩125.52 billion (2022)
- Total assets: ▲ ₩2,375.51 billion (2022)
- Total equity: ▲ ₩1,552.87 billion (2022)
- Owners: Renault (52.9%); Geely Automobile Holdings (34%); Samsung Card (13.1%)
- Number of employees: 3,638 (December 2022)
- Parent: Renault Group
- Website: renault.co.kr

Renault Korea Co., Ltd. (Korean: 르노코리아) is a South Korean car manufacturer headquartered in Busan where its single assembly site is also located, with additional facilities at Seoul (administration), Giheung (research and development) and Daegu (vehicle testing).

The company was first established as Samsung Motors in 1994 by the chaebol Samsung, with technical assistance from Nissan. It started selling cars in 1998, just before South Korea was hit by the East Asian financial crisis. In 2000, it became a subsidiary of the French car manufacturer Renault, being renamed Renault Samsung Motors, while Samsung maintained a minority ownership. It adopted Renault Korea Motors as trade name in March 2022 and as its legal name in August. In December 2022, Geely acquired a minority ownership in the company through capital increase as part of wider partnership agreement with Renault, although it still is a consolidated subsidiary of the latter.

In April 2024, the company adopted its present name, thus renamed to Renault Korea and officially using the brand name Renault. Renault Korea markets a range of cars, including electric models and crossovers.

== History ==
=== Beginnings: Samsung Group era (1994–2000) ===
In the early 1990s, Samsung's Chairman Lee Kun-hee recognised the automotive industry as the culmination of several others. For the Samsung Group, this would allow to leverage resources and technologies from the entire group including Samsung Electrics and Samsung Electronics. He initially tried to take control of Kia, but competition from other bidders and legal restrictions led to him dropping the idea. Kia was eventually purchased by Hyundai.

Lee decided to create a new carmaker, Samsung Motors (also known as SMI) and a truck manufacturer, Samsung Commercial Vehicles Co., Ltd. (Korean: 삼성상용차 주식회사; RR: Samseong Sangyongcha Jusikoesa), the latter through Samsung Heavy Industries with Nissan Diesel's support. SMI was established in 1994 (incorporated in 1995) and Daegu-based Samsung Commercial Vehicles in 1996. In March 1995, construction work began on the Busan factory. Shortly after SMI started its operations, the Asian financial crisis hit. Samsung divested itself of SMI as well as other non-core subsidiaries. SMI was put up for sale, with Daewoo Motors being one of the first interested companies, but, as the crisis deepened, Daewoo Motors itself was bought by GM. Hyundai Motors was also considered as a possible buyer, but corporate politics and strife between the Samsung Group and the Hyundai Group made this impossible. Negotiations with Renault started in December 1998, and in September 2000 the French automaker bought a 70% stake for US$560 million. Samsung Commercial Vehicles was kept by Samsung, but finally it filed for bankruptcy at the end of 2000.

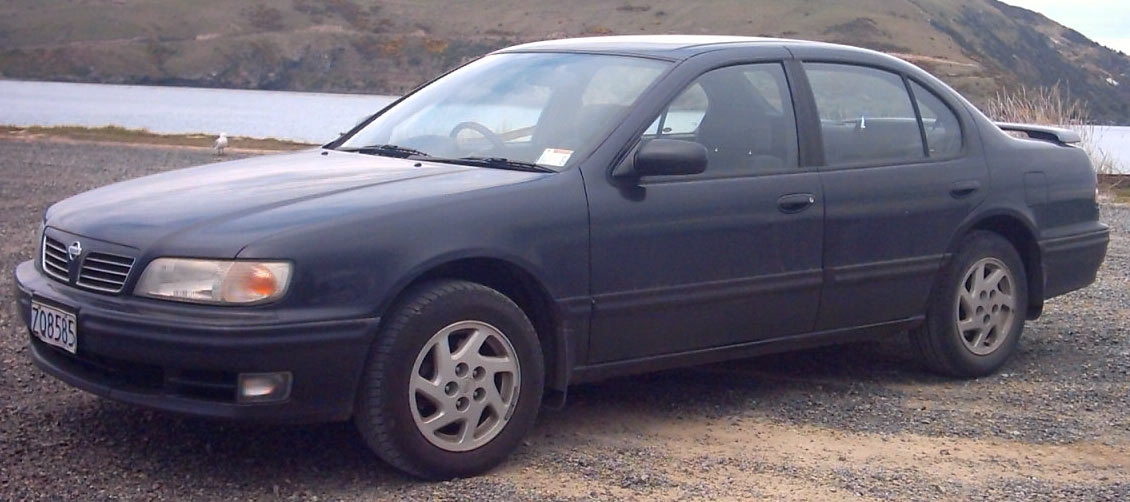
A Nissan Cefiro S Touring, which formed the base for an older version of the SM5

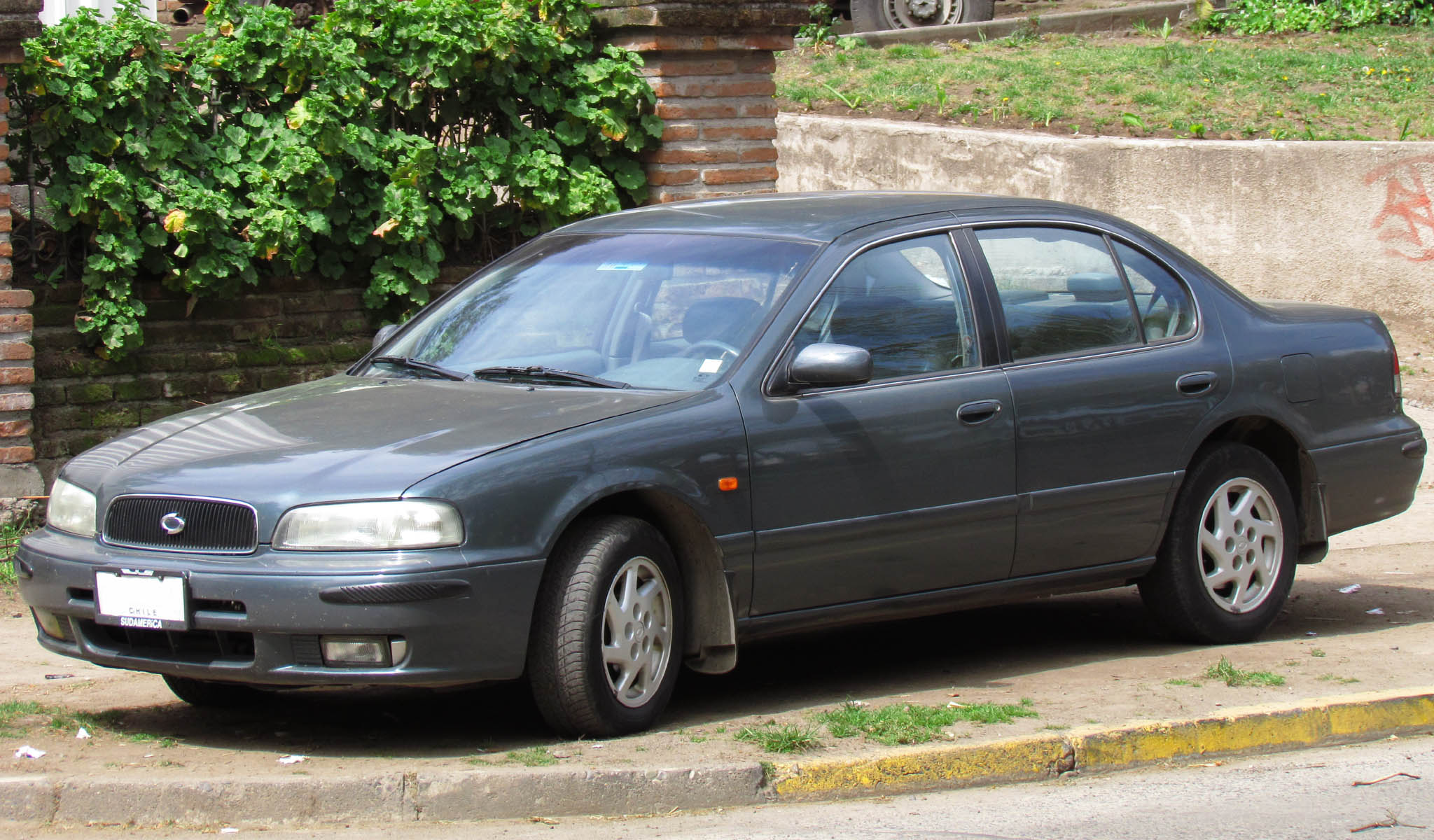
1999 Samsung SQ5, later called SM5

Coupled with his interest on cars, Lee's project of building SMI as a global automotive company started out with technical assistance from Nissan, a company which at the time of SMI's early stages was in dire financial straits. SMI's affiliation with Nissan could have been one of the reasons for Renault buying a major share of the company, as Renault had become a major shareholder of Nissan by then. One of the very early planners for SMI has stated that technical affiliations for SMI were initially considered with Volkswagen, BMW or Honda. From 1998, Renault Samsung Motors sold cars in Chile with the introduction of the SQ5 (the current SM5).

=== Later developments: Renault era (2000–present) ===
==== Product and market expansion (2000–2010) ====
After the 2000 acquisition, Renault renamed Samsung Motors as Renault Samsung Motors (RSM). That year, the company's sales began to improve. Journalists attribute this to the success of the first car manufactured at Busan in taxi fleets (the SM5), which led to increased confidence of the model within the rest of their customer base. During the following years, the company introduced a new vehicle range, including the SM3 in 2002, the SM7 in 2004 and the crossover QM5 in 2007. Over time, RSM changed its products from a Nissan-based architecture to a Renault-based one. As part of the Renault group, Renault Samsung became an export-oriented manufacturer.

In 2005, Renault increased its stake by acquiring an additional 10% share from the company's creditors. On 26 June 2009, Renault and Samsung agreed to renew the right of the former to use the "Samsung" trade mark on its products until 2020.

==== Decline in sales, electric vehicles and recovery attempts (2010–2022) ====
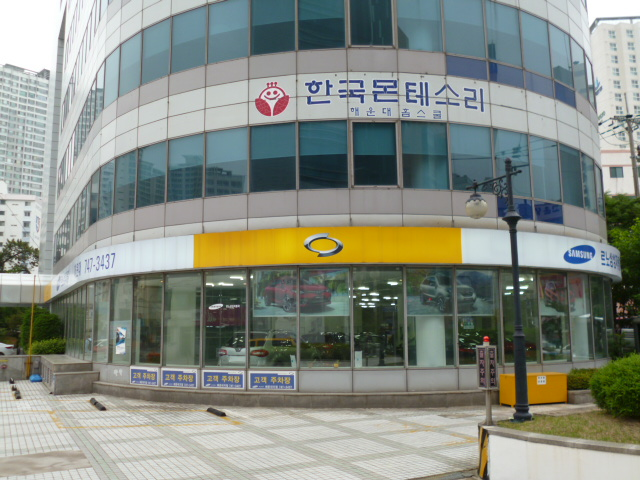
A Renault Samsung dealership in Busan, 2016

The pressure from both Hyundai and Kia, dominant automakers in the South Korean market, increased during the 2010s, pushing RSM sales down by 27% in 2011. In the first half of 2012, they fell 41%. In August 2012, a personnel reduction of about 80% of employees was presented by management. Finally, Renault reduced its Busan personnel by 15% (about 800 employees). With the aim of reviving the company, it invested (together with Nissan) US$160 million to make Nissan Rogues for export to improve production output and also presented revised versions of the SM3 and SM5. During 2013, the company started to market a new compact crossover, the QM3, based on the Captur. By late 2015, its cumulative sales since 2000 in the South Korean market reached 1.5 million units. In 2016, Renault Samsung introduced the SM6, a new mid-size model which is a Talisman with some minor changes for the South Korean market, and the crossover QM6. In 2018, the company introduced the Clio and the Master. By 2019, production and sales were again declining, and the company announced an extension of its contract with Nissan for continuing the assembly of Nissan Rogues until March 2020, although in a reduced capacity to secure production volume. RSM also announced plans to gain more production orders from parent Renault. Tensions with labour increased, as the company started an early retirement plan aimed at reducing the workforce. During 2019, Renault Samsung discontinued most of its saloon models to focus on crossover SUVs. In June 2019, the company ended production of the SM5. At the end of the year, the internal combustion engined-SM3 and the SM7 were also put out of production, with sales ending by January 2020. In March 2020, the company put on sale the XM3 crossover.

In 2012, RSM introduced an electric version of its SM3 car known as the SM3 Z.E., imported from Turkey. In October 2013 the car started to be assembled at the Busan plant and in the same year it became the leading electric vehicle by sales in South Korea with a 58% market share. In 2016, RSM also announced its intention to market the Twizy which was launched in 2017. In 2020, the company started to sell the imported Zoe. In May 2016, the company announced a project to develop and produce a 1-tonne electric light commercial vehicle with a 250-kilometre range on a single charge in partnership with local companies.

As of 2013, Chile was the only major market outside South Korea that RSM has sold its cars under the Renault Samsung Motors marque and not as rebadged Renaults. In 2015, Renault Samsung badging was replaced entirely by Renault in Chile, with the vehicles themselves now being known under their global Renault names (e.g. the Renault Samsung SM5 is the Renault Latitude).

In August 2020, RSM said it did not intend to renew the agreement to use the "Samsung" trade mark set to end that month, although it would keep using the Samsung name for a further two years as part of a "grace" clause. In March 2022, the company dropped the Samsung name, adopting the trade name Renault Korea Motors and starting the process of changing the legal name by August.

==== Geely involvement (2022–present) ====
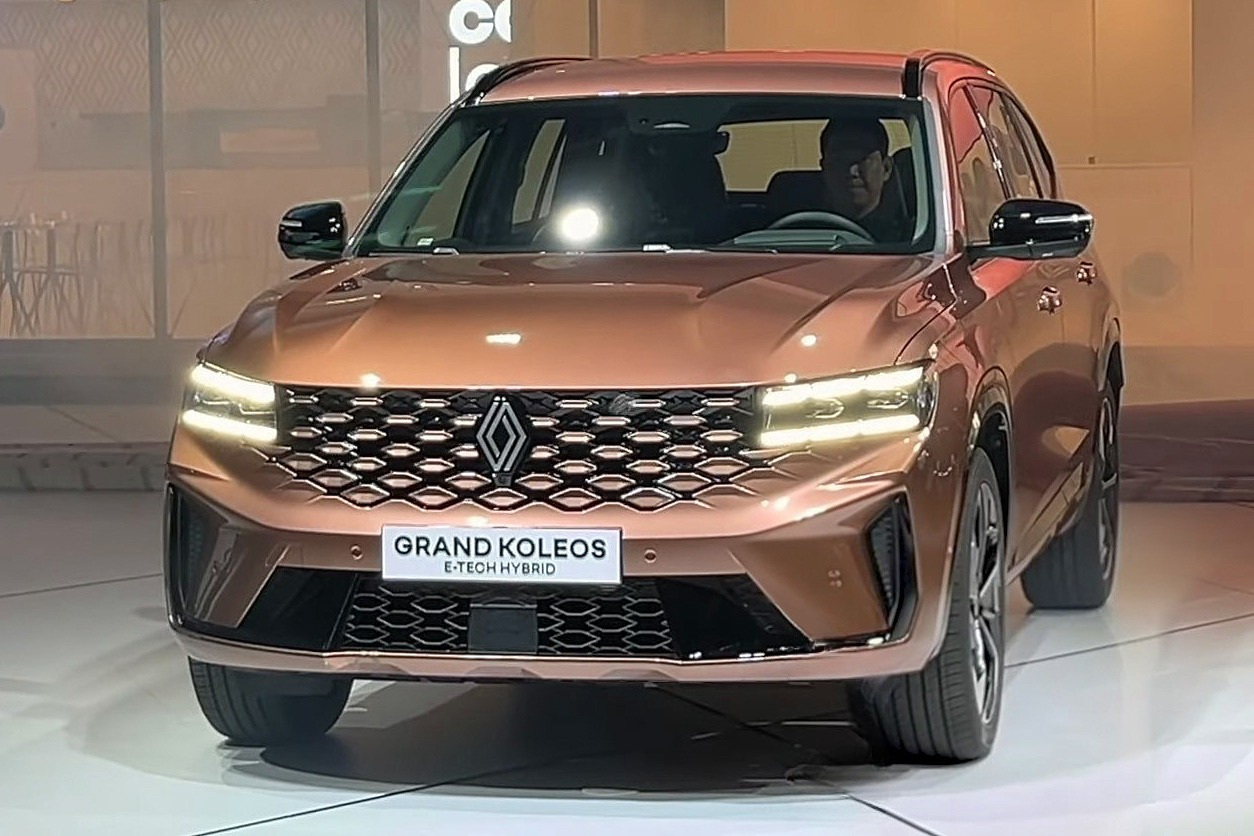
Renault Grand Koleos

In January 2022, RSM's parent Renault and Geely signed an agreement by which the South Korean manufacturer would produce vehicles based on the latter's Compact Modular Architecture platform, initially intended for the domestic market. Production was set to start by 2024. In May 2022, Renault said a Geely subsidiary was set to acquire a 34.02% of Renault Korea Motors through capital increase as part of their partnership, although the company would continue to be majority owned by Renault and a consolidated subsidiary of it. The capital increase operation was completed by the end of the year, leaving Renault with a 52.9% majority stake. Samsung share (through Samsung Card) was reduced from 19.9% to 13.1%. Samsung is planning to divest its shares.

In April 2024, the company changed its trade and legal name to Renault Korea, removing "Motors" and, except for the SM6, moved all its locally sold products completely to the Renault marque.

In June 2024, Renault Korea introduced the Renault Grand Koleos, heavily based on the Geely Xingyue L / Monjaro and using Geely's Compact Modular Architecture platform. In January 2026, Renault Korea introduced the Renault Filante, also using the Compact Modular Architecture platform.

== Facilities ==
=== Manufacturing ===
The car manufacturing plant is located at Busan in the Sinho Regional Industrial Site and began production in 1998. It covers 1,650,000 m^{2} and has the capacity to manufacture 300,000 cars per year. It can produce various models simultaneously in a single production line. The plant is divided into seven production shops (stamping, body, painting, bumper, assembly, al-casting and engine).

=== Research and development ===
Renault Technology Korea (Korean: 르노테크놀로지코리아; RR: Reuno Tekeunolloji Koria), located at Giheung near Seoul, is one of the largest research and development facilities of Renault after Guyancourt's Technocentre. It was established in 1997 as the Samsung Motors Technical Centre, being expanded in 2000 and renamed as Renault Samsung Technical Centre (Korean: 르노삼성 중앙연구소; RR: Reuno Samseong Jungang Yeonguso). It adopted its present name in 2017.

At first, the facility was only involved in car engineering, but at the end of 2002 the RSM Design Centre (Korean: 르노삼성차 디자인센터; RR: Reuno Samseongja Dijain Senteo) was created within it to locally design various cars manufactured by the company. In early 2013 the design branch was renamed Renault Design Asia (Korean: 르노 디자인 아시아; RR: Reuno Dijain Asia) and was put in charge of supervising Renault's Asian design operations.

In November 2018, Renault Samsung Motors opened a vehicle testing centre in Daegu for vehicles aimed at the Asia-Pacific market, in partnership with the city government and Korea Intelligent Automobile Parts Promotion. The facility can test electric, autonomous and connected vehicles.

In May 2023, Renault Korea Motors said it planned to open a research and development facility for electric vehicles within its Busan plant complex, in partnership with the Busan.

=== Administration ===
From 1995 until 2013, the company's head offices were at the HSBC Building in Jung District, Seoul. In January 2013, it moved them to a purposely-built facility, the RSM Tower (Korean: RSM 타워; RR: RSM Tawo) in Gasan-dong, Seoul. In December 2017, RSM moved most management functions to Yeoksam-dong, Seoul, although kept some offices and car maintenance activities at the RSM Tower.

There are additional administrative offices in Busan.

== Branding ==
=== Logos ===
Renault Samsung badge until 2022

Renault Korea logo (2022–2024)

Renault Samsung Motors initially had two logos: the corporate logo and the marque logo. The first was for corporate communications and an adaptation of the Samsung Group's logo. The second is the "eye of the typhoon" logo which was used as marque's badge and in advertising. The imported models introduced from 2017 onwards in South Korea kept Renault's diamond badge instead of being rebadged with the Renault Samsung logo.

In March 2022, the company introduced a flatter, two-dimensional version of the eye of the typhoon as both marque and corporate logo. The logo has lines similar to the 2021 Renault diamond logo. In April 2024, the company unified both imported and locally produced models under the Renault diamond marque logo. The SM6 was the only one set to keep the eye of the typhoon until its upcoming discontinuation in October 2024.

=== Slogan ===
The advertising slogan of Renault Samsung Motors is Discover the Difference (Korean: 디스커버 더 디퍼런스; RR: Diseukeobeo Deo Dipeoreonseu) and was introduced in 2009. According to the company, it refers to the distinct quality of its products.

=== Vehicle nomenclature ===
Up to April 2024, the company included in its vehicles' designations numbers related to their sizes. Those numbers are 3, meaning compact or small vehicle, 5 and 6, mid-size vehicle, and 7, large vehicle. The designations also include the letters S and M, which stands for Samsung Motors and Samsung Motor Sedan. However, the sport utility vehicles replace the SM combination by QM (Quest Motoring). The imported models introduced from 2017 onwards in South Korea kept their original names instead of adopting RSM's nomenclature. In March 2020, the company introduced the XM nomenclature for a locally produced crossover SUV. In April 2024, as most of the products were merged into the Renault branding scheme, the nomenclature system was eliminated, although two models (QM6 and SM6) kept their names.

=== Typography ===
In 2016, Sandoll Communications, Inc. built a Hangul version of Renault's Renault Life font family for the company. It consists of three fonts in three weights (light, regular, bold) and one width in Roman only. The font was designed by Park Ju-seong and Wi Ye-jin, under the direction of Lee Do-kyung.

== Leadership ==
- Jérôme Stoll (2000–2006)
- Jean-Marie Hurtiger (2006–2011)
- François Provost (2011–2016)
- Park Dong Hoon (2016–2018)
- Domnique Signora (2018–2022)
- Stéphanie Deblaise (2022–2025)
- Nicolas Paris (2025–present)

== Solar energy project ==
In March 2013, Renault Samsung Motors completed the installation of solar panels in the parking lots, rooftops and surrounding land of its Busan facility to create a 20-MW solar plant, one of the largest in the world. The project was carried out through a joint venture, Busan Shinho Solar Power SPC (Korean: 부산신호태양광 특수목적법인; RR: Busan Sinho Taeyang-gwang Teugsumogjeogbeob-in), formed by RSM, Korea East-West Power and KC Cottrell, which also manages the plant. It provides energy to the RSM operations and nearby houses.

== Model lineup ==
=== Current lineup ===
As of March 2026, the model lineup consists of the following models:

- Filante (a crossover SUV)
- Grand Koleos (based on the Geely Xingyue L; branded as Koleos in export markets)
- Arkana (a coupe-styled crossover)
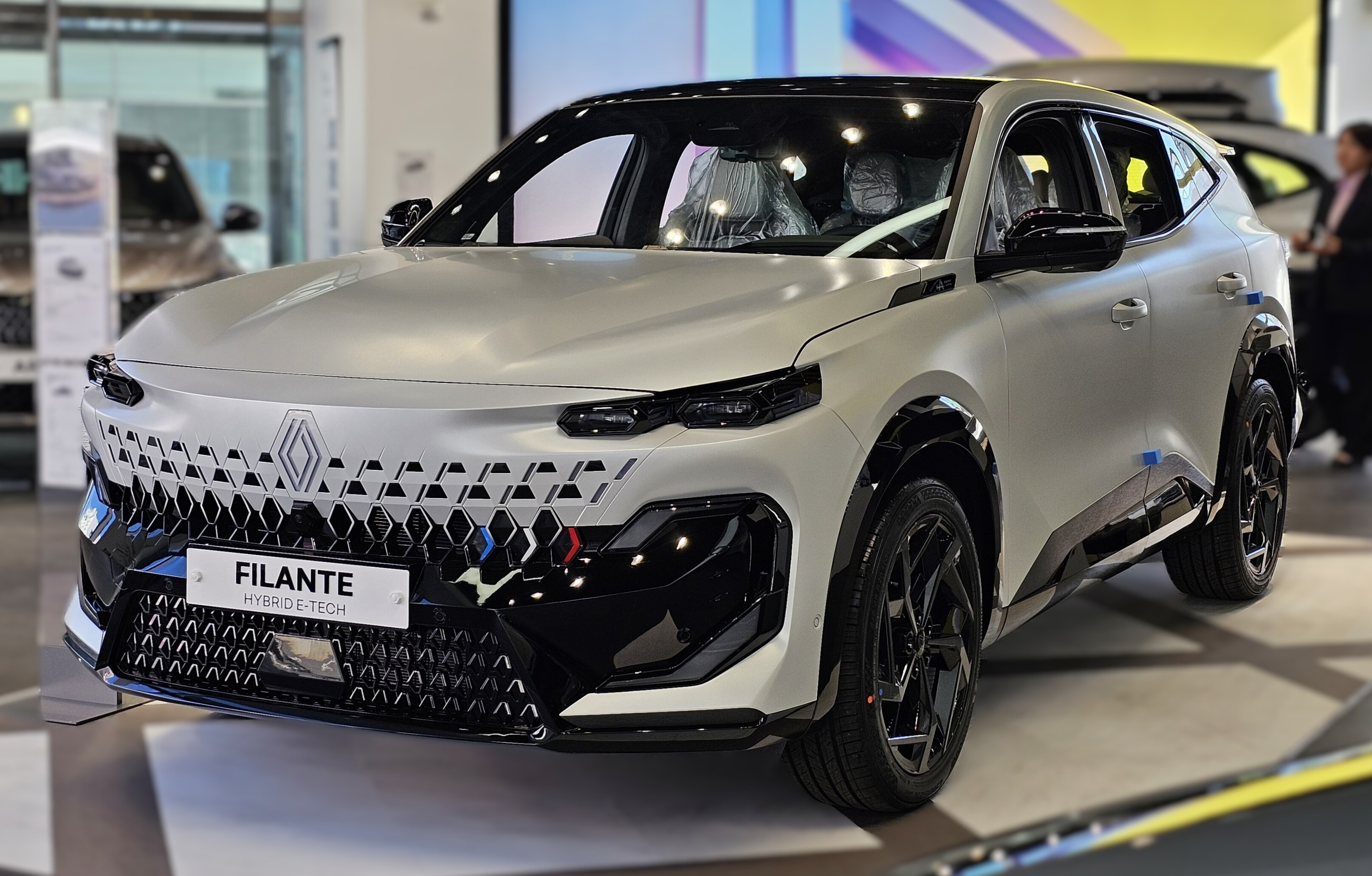
Renault Filante

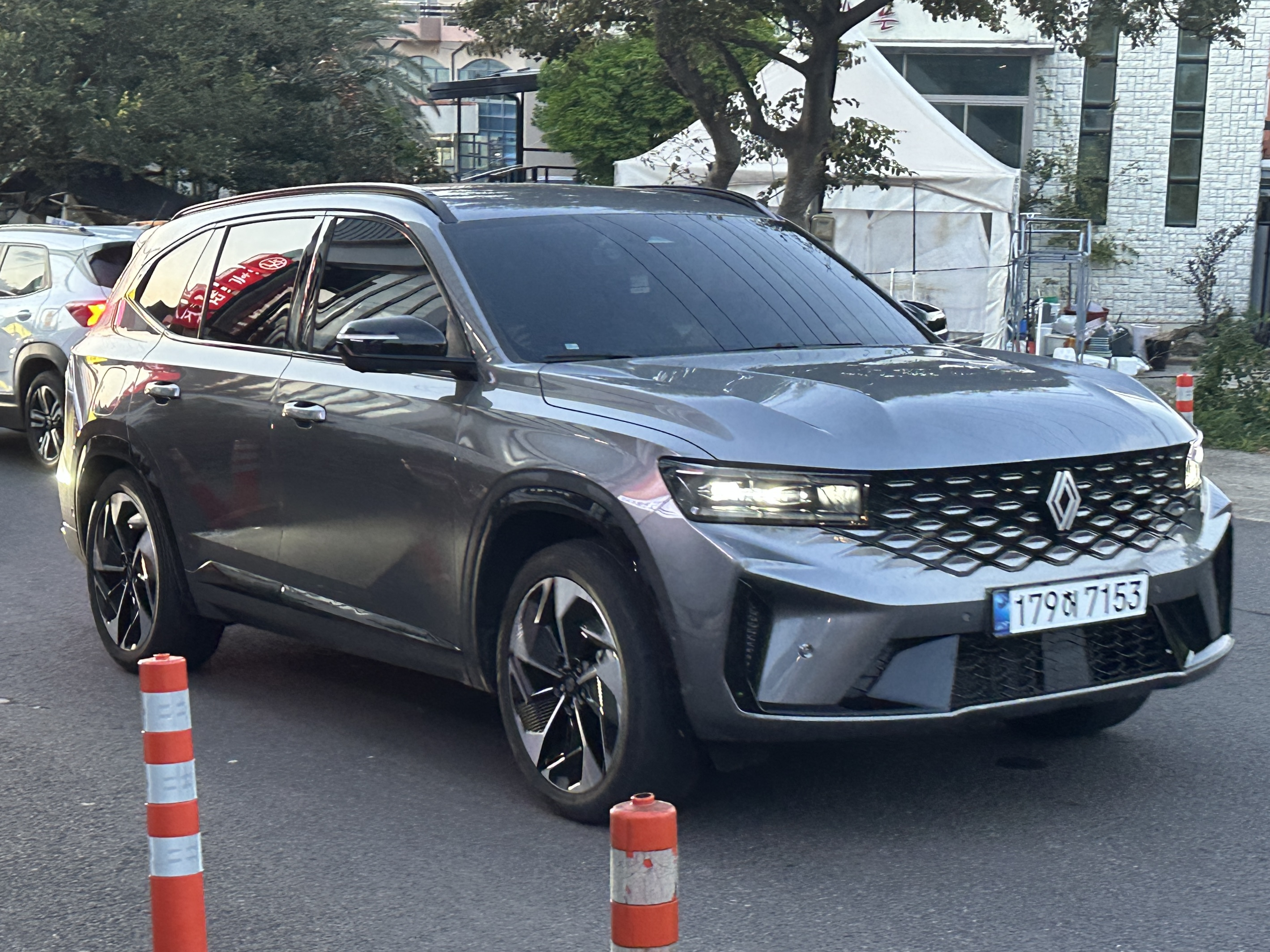
Renault Grand Koleos

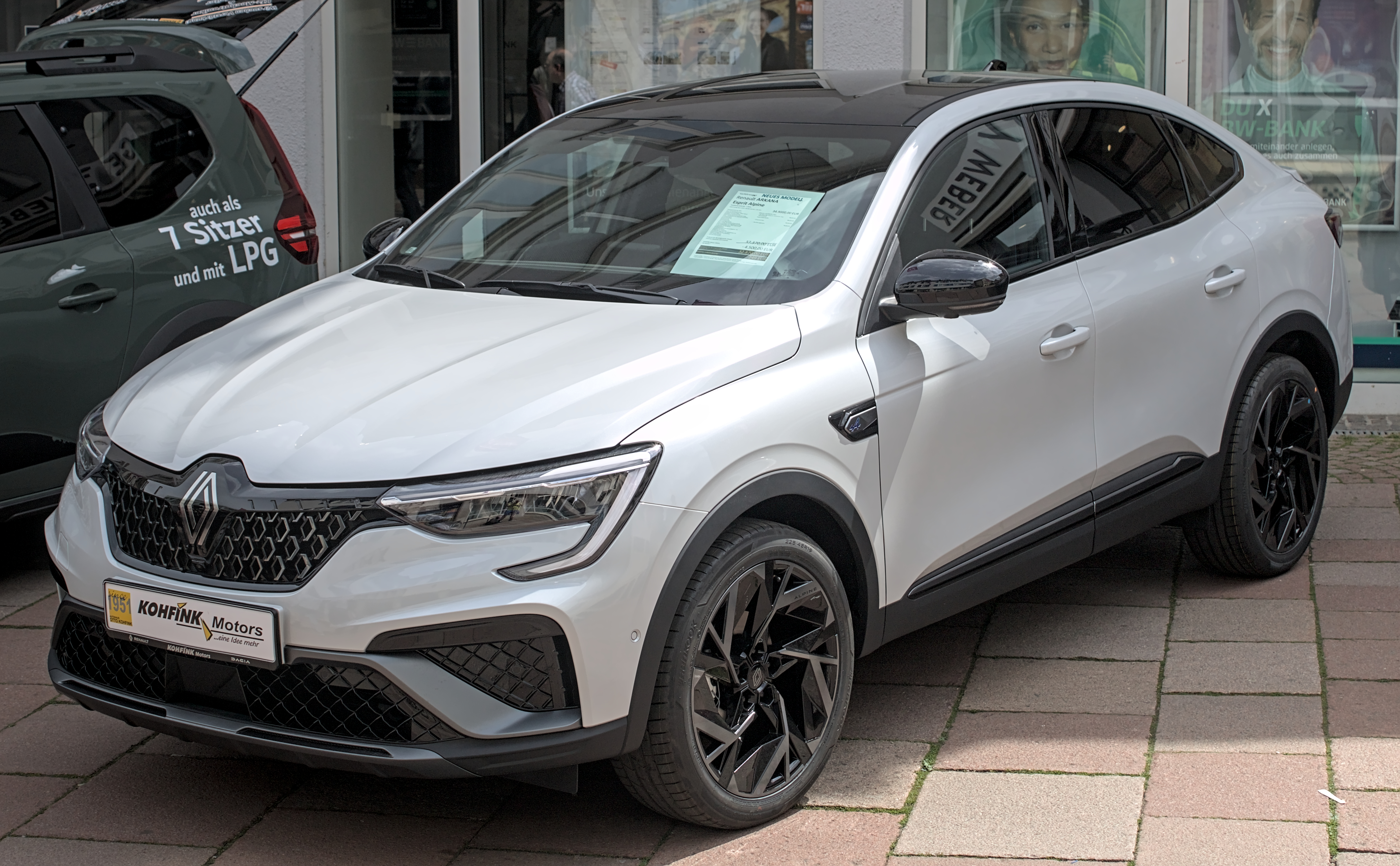
Renault Arkana

=== Former lineup ===
This is a list of models formerly marketed by the company:

- Twizy (imported / later locally produced electric microcar quadricycle)
- Zoe (imported electric supermini)
- Clio (imported supermini)
- Captur (imported subcompact crossover SUV)
- Master (imported light commercial vehicle)
- XM3 (a coupe-styled crossover based on the Renault Arkana)
- QM3 (an imported subcompact crossover based on the first-generation Renault Captur)
- QM5 (the first crossover SUV for the company, based on the first-generation Renault Koleos)
- QM6 (the second crossover for the company, based on the second-generation Renault Koleos)
- SM3 (small family car)
- SM3 Z.E. (electric small family car based on the Renault Fluence Z.E.)
- SM5 (large family car)
- SM6 (large family car based on the Renault Talisman)
- SM7 (executive car)
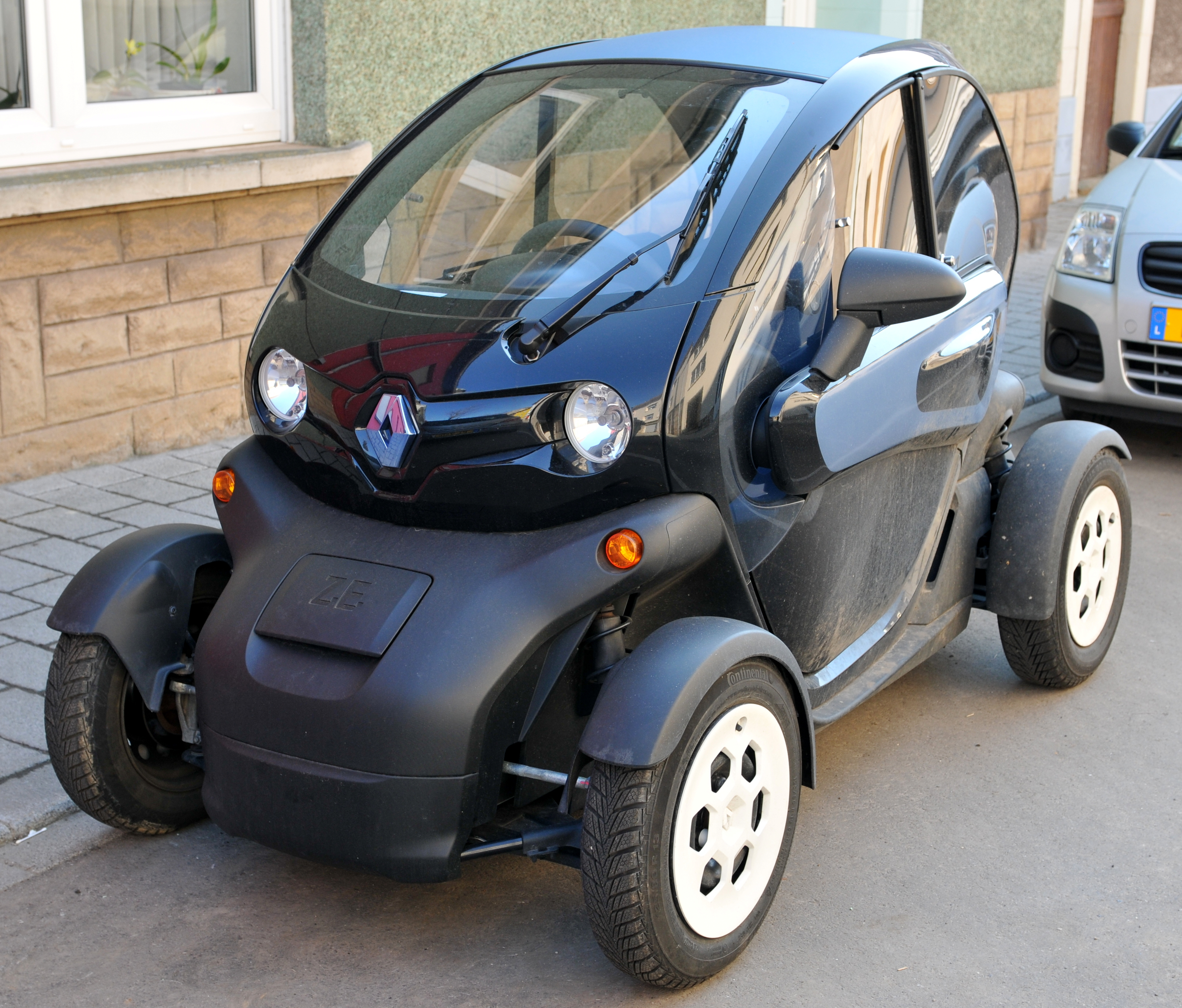
Renault Twizy

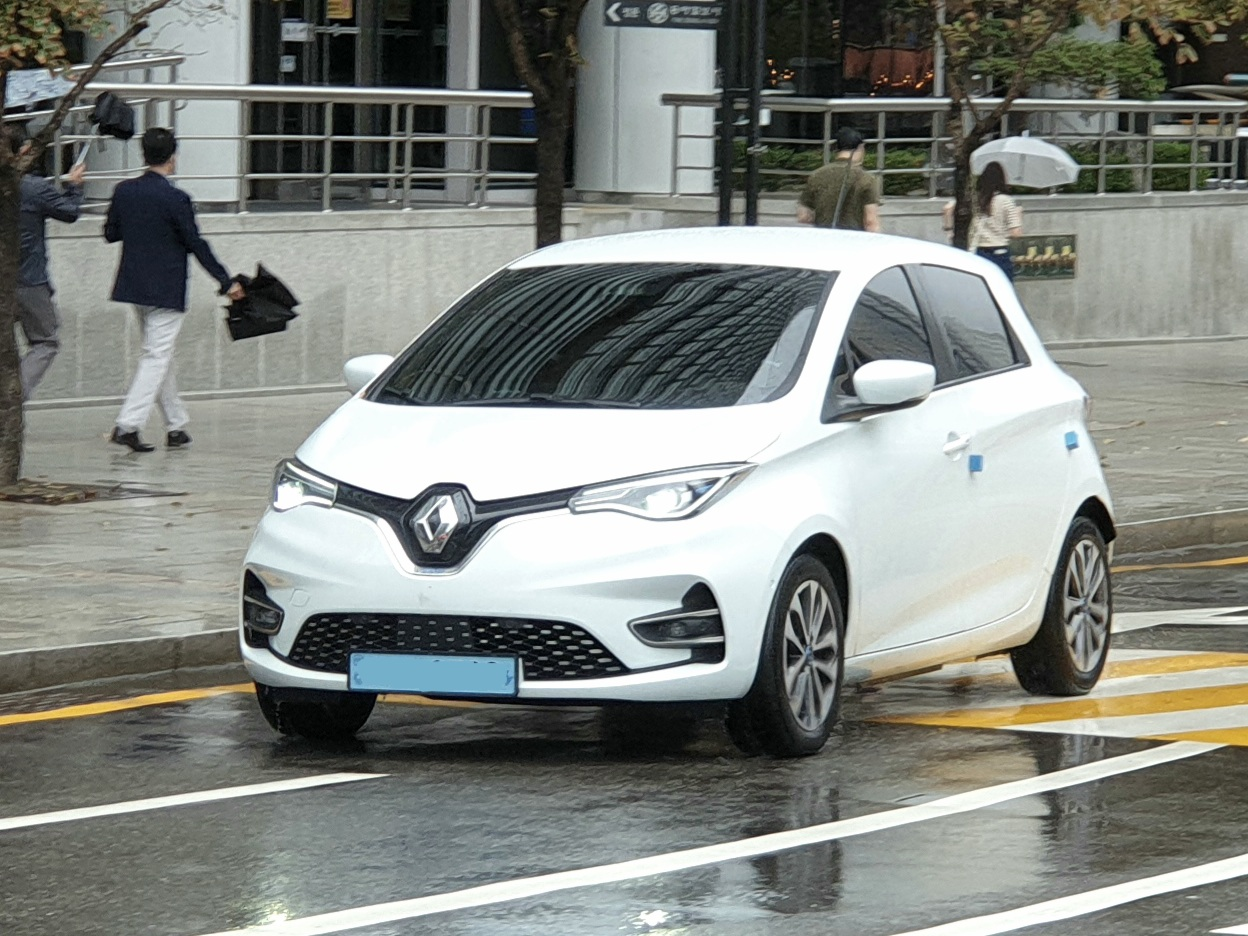
Renault Zoe

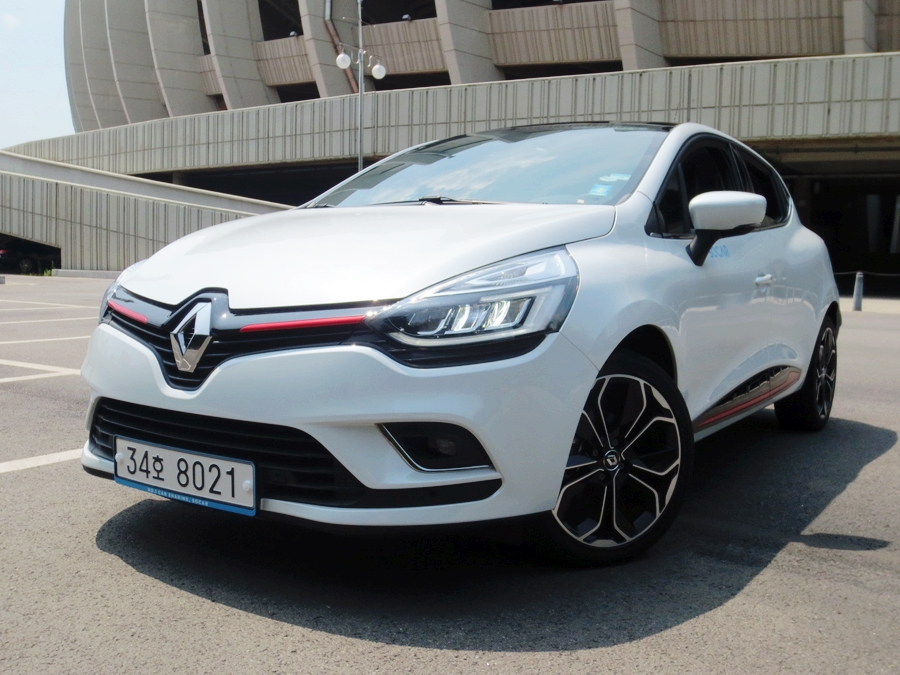
Renault Clio

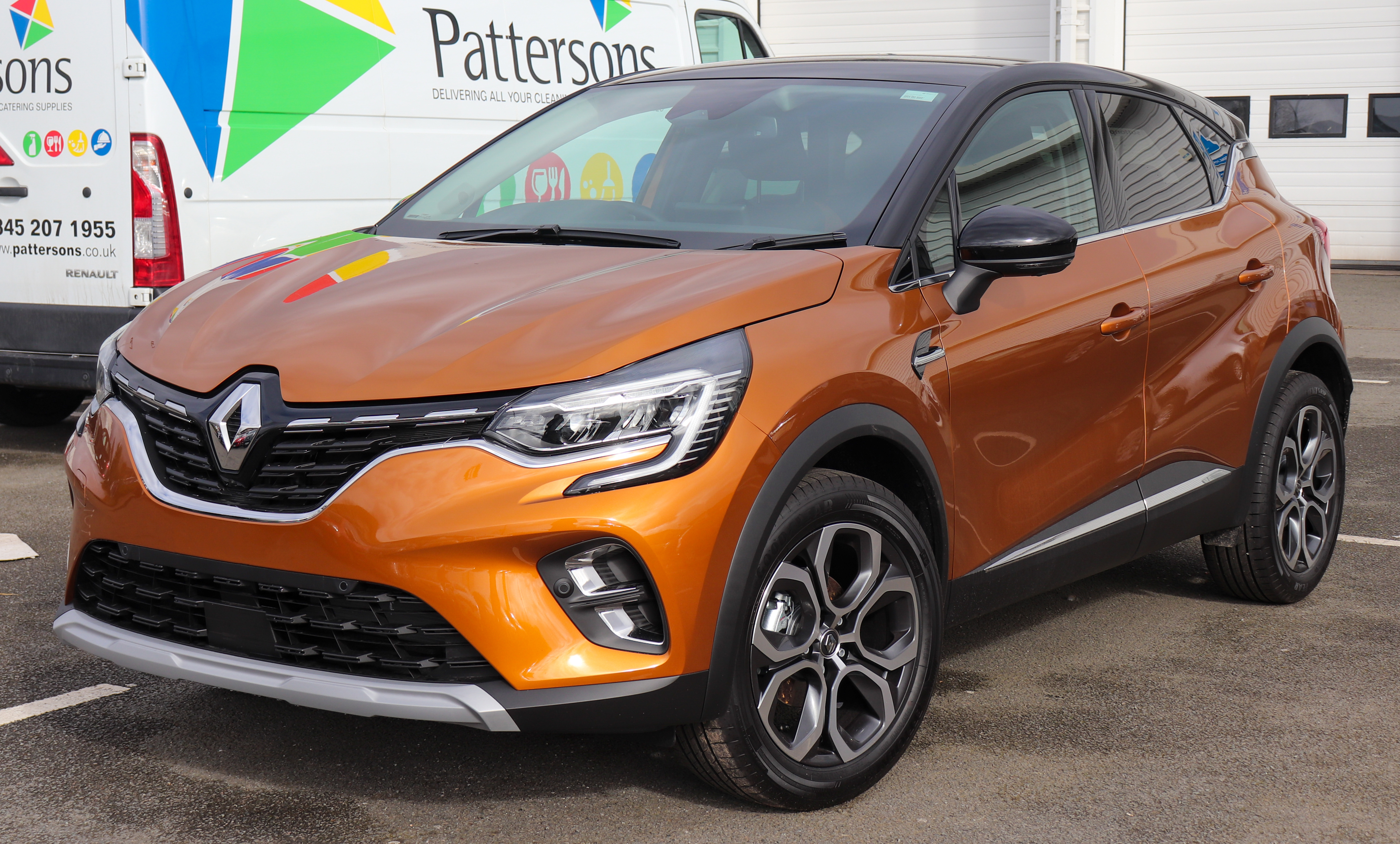
Renault Captur

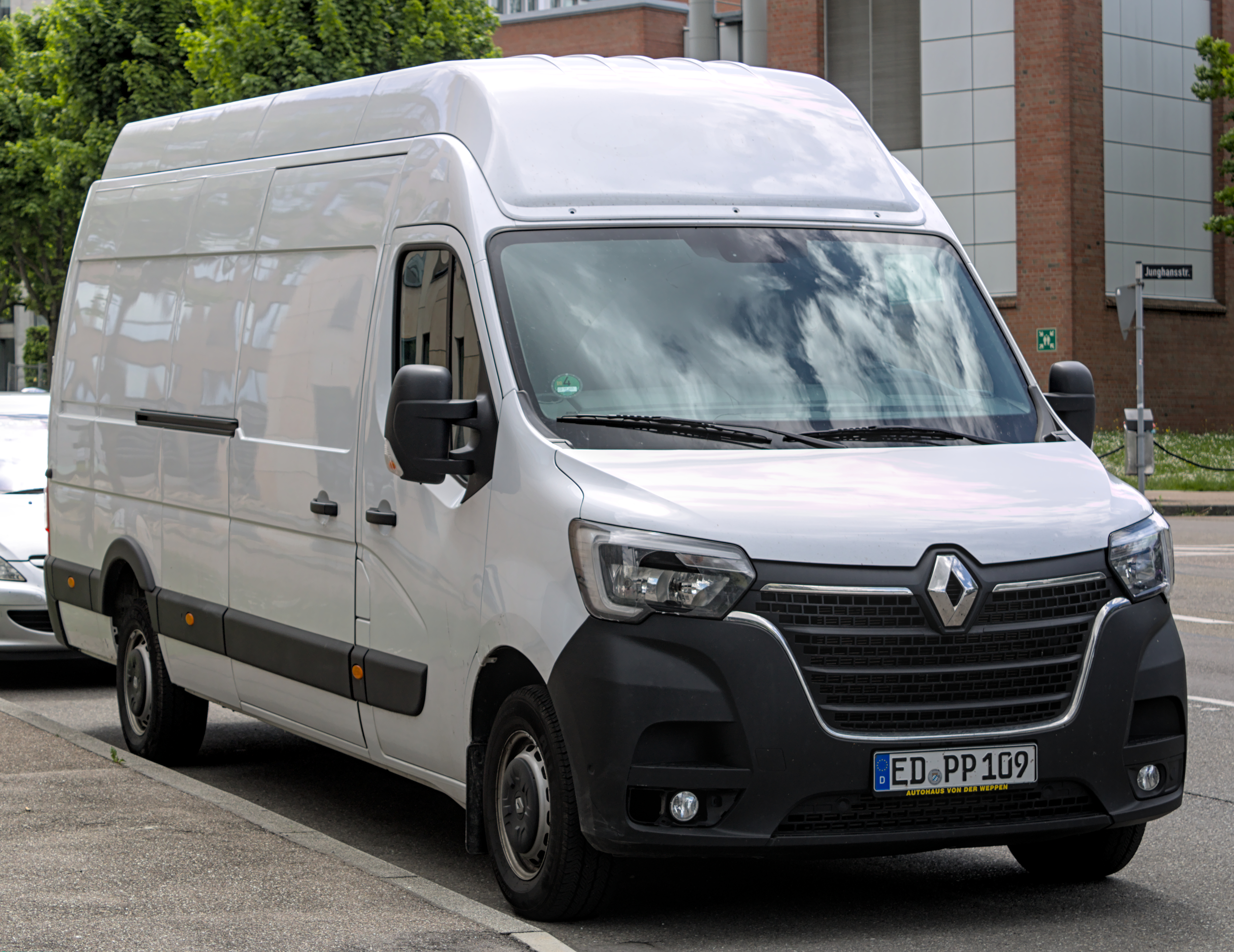
Renault Master

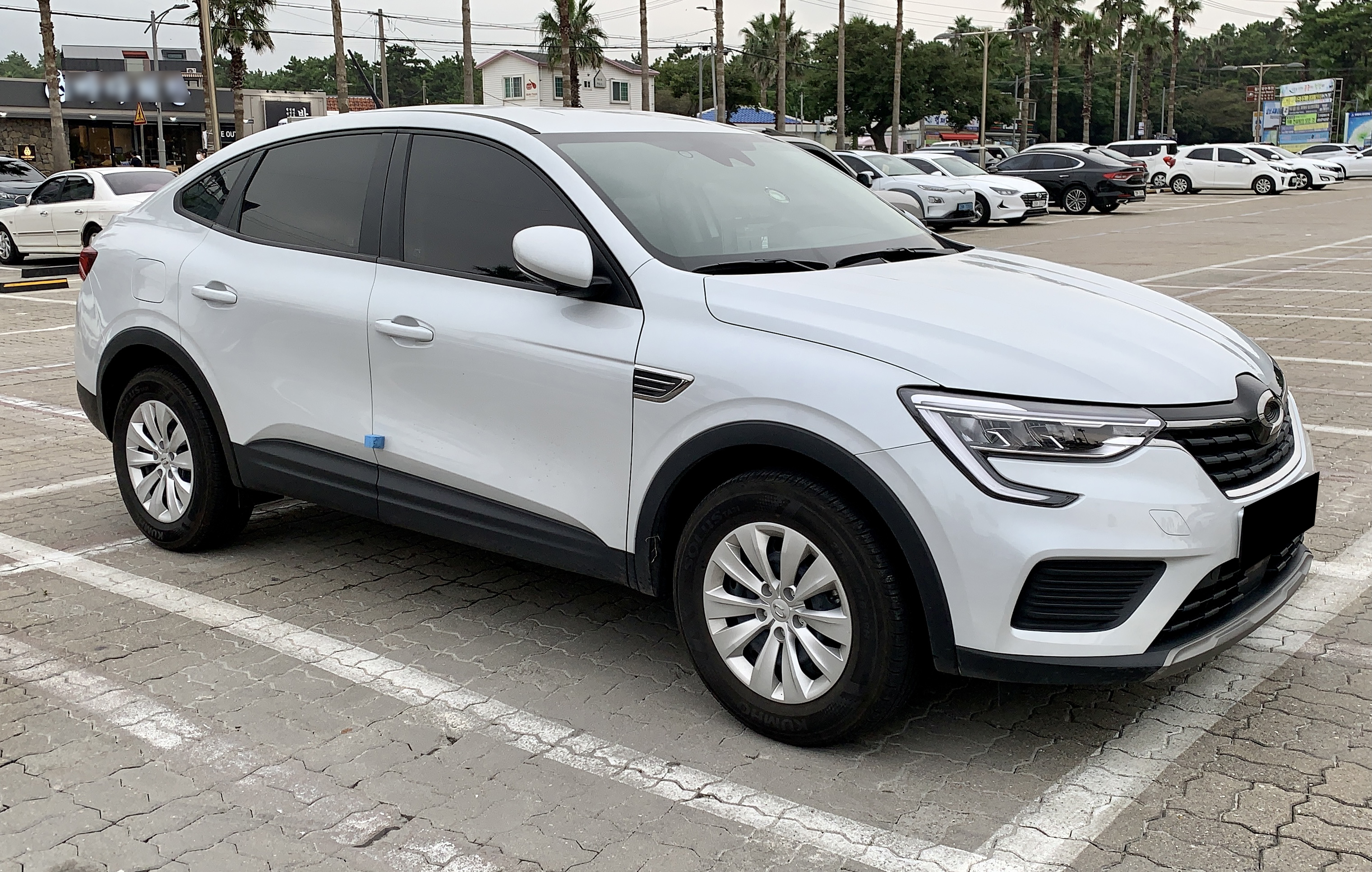
Renault XM3

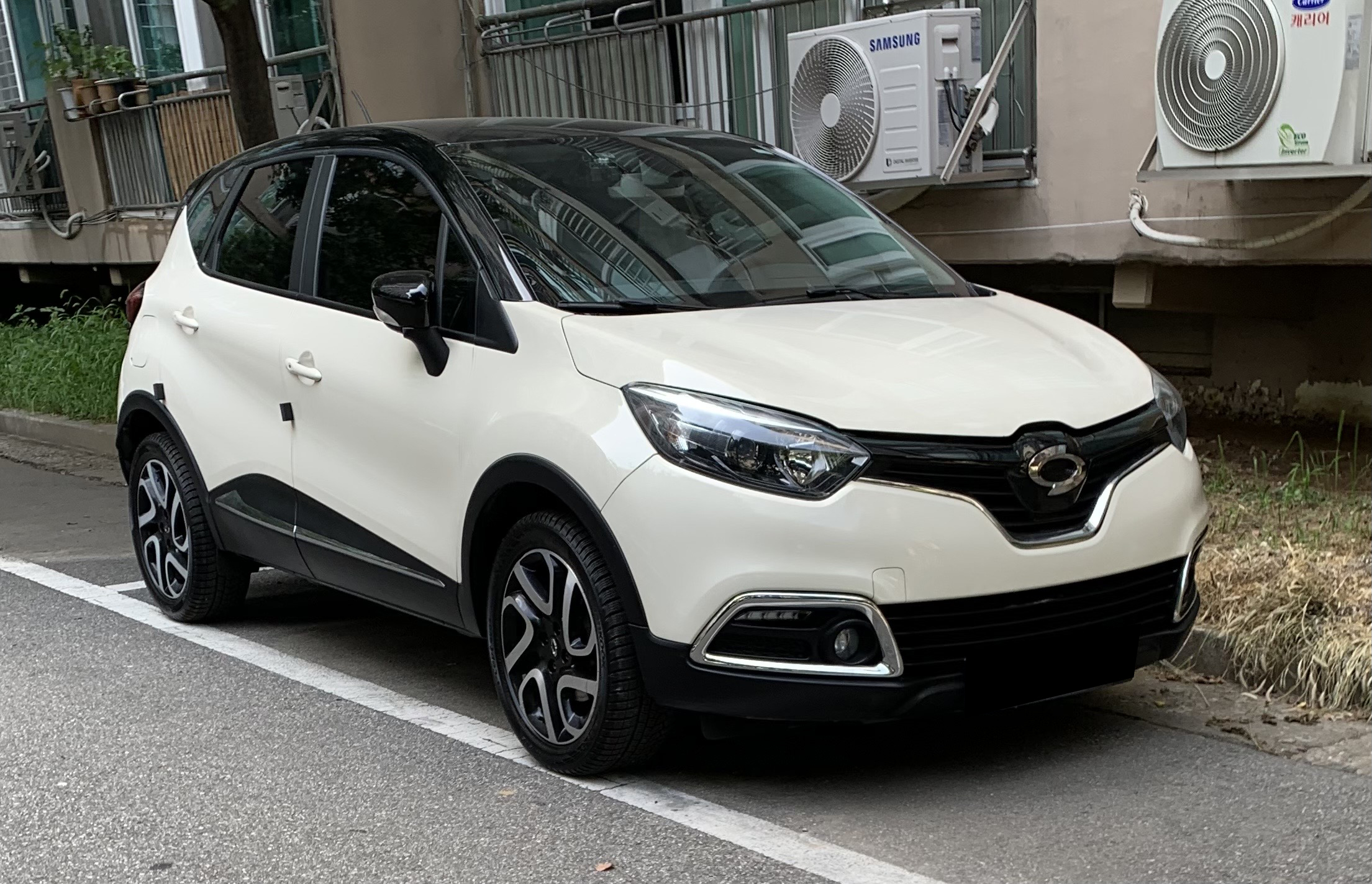
Renault Samsung QM3

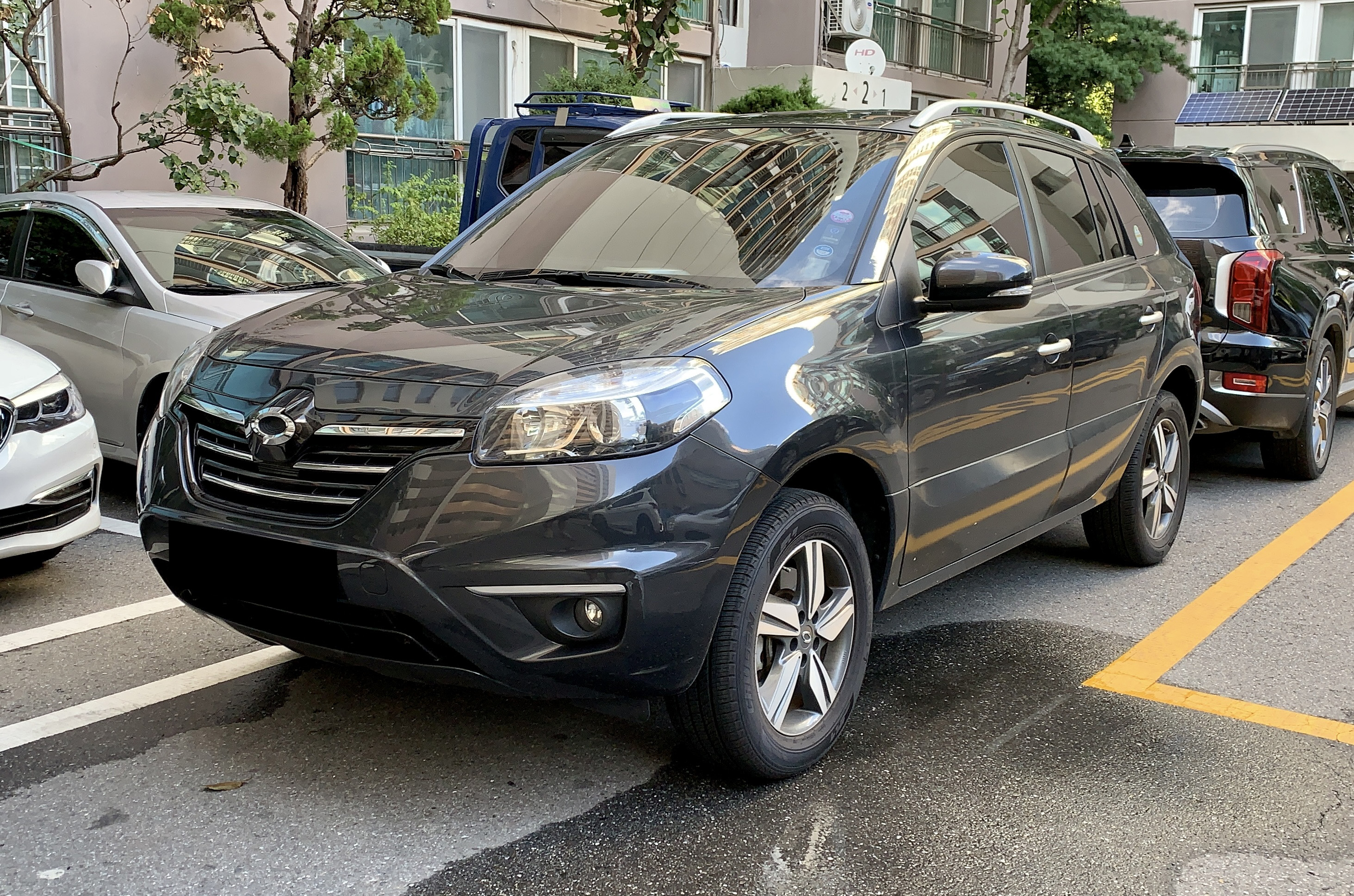
Renault Samsung QM5

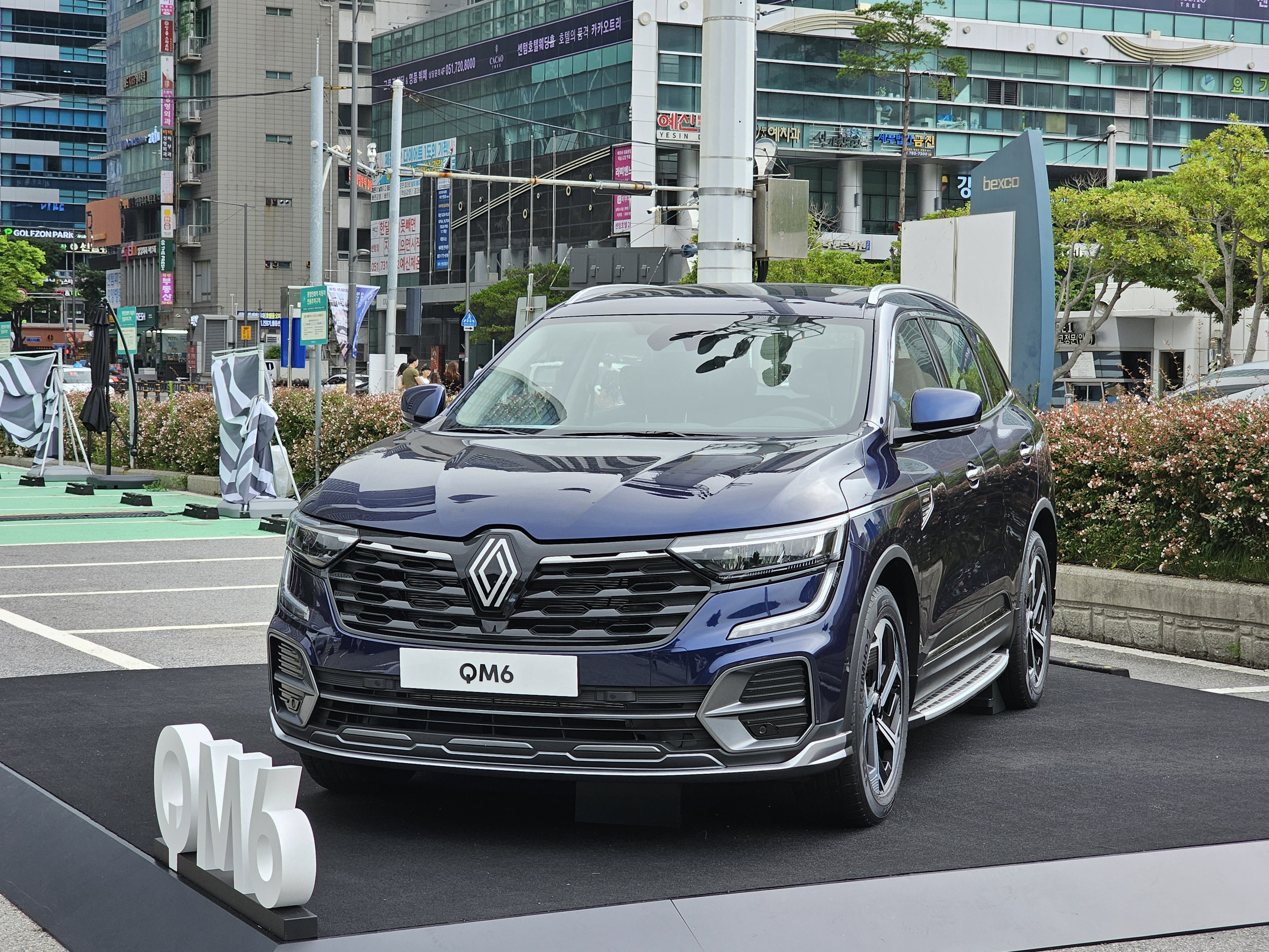
Renault QM6

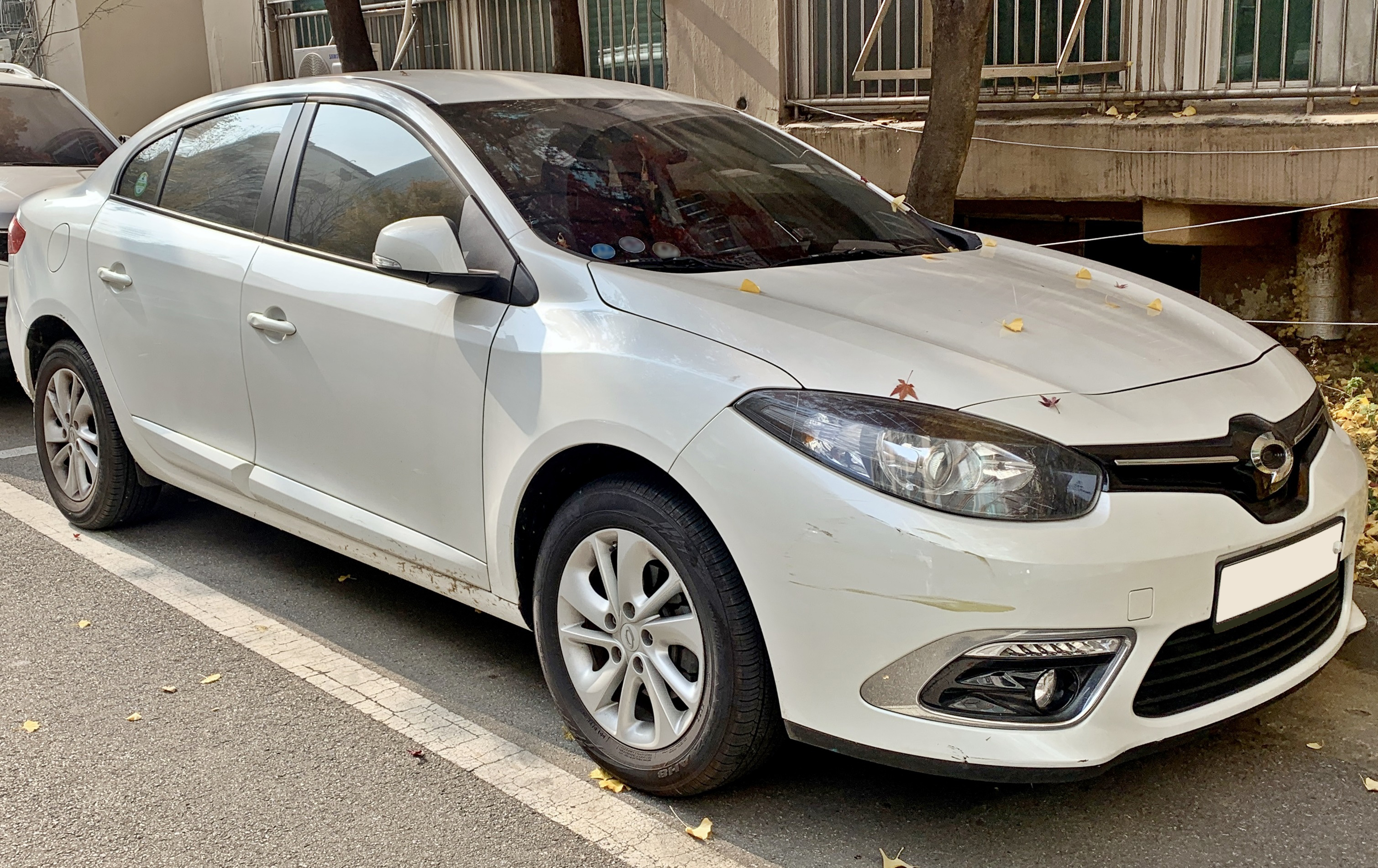
Renault Samsung SM3

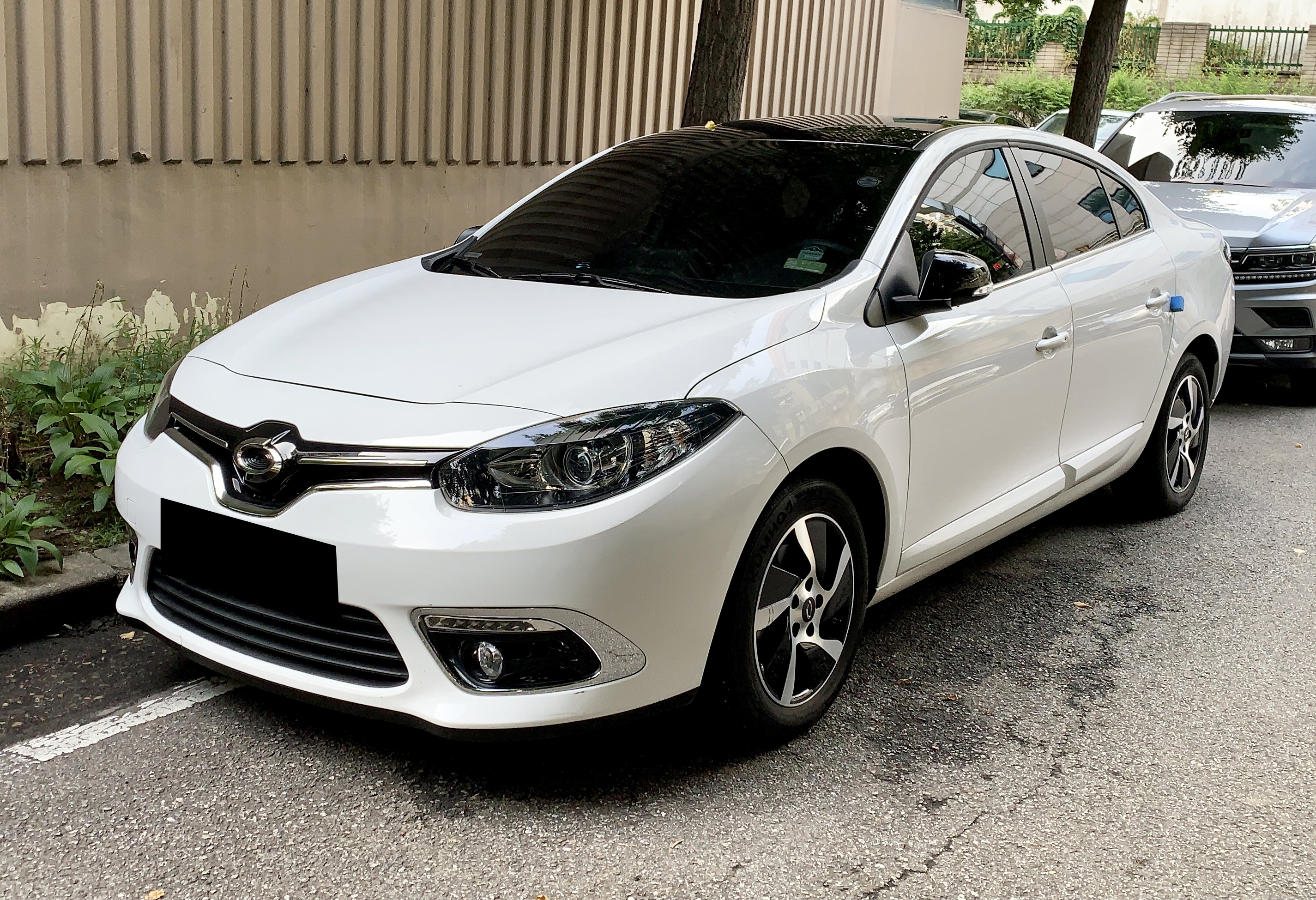
Renault Samsung SM3 Z.E.

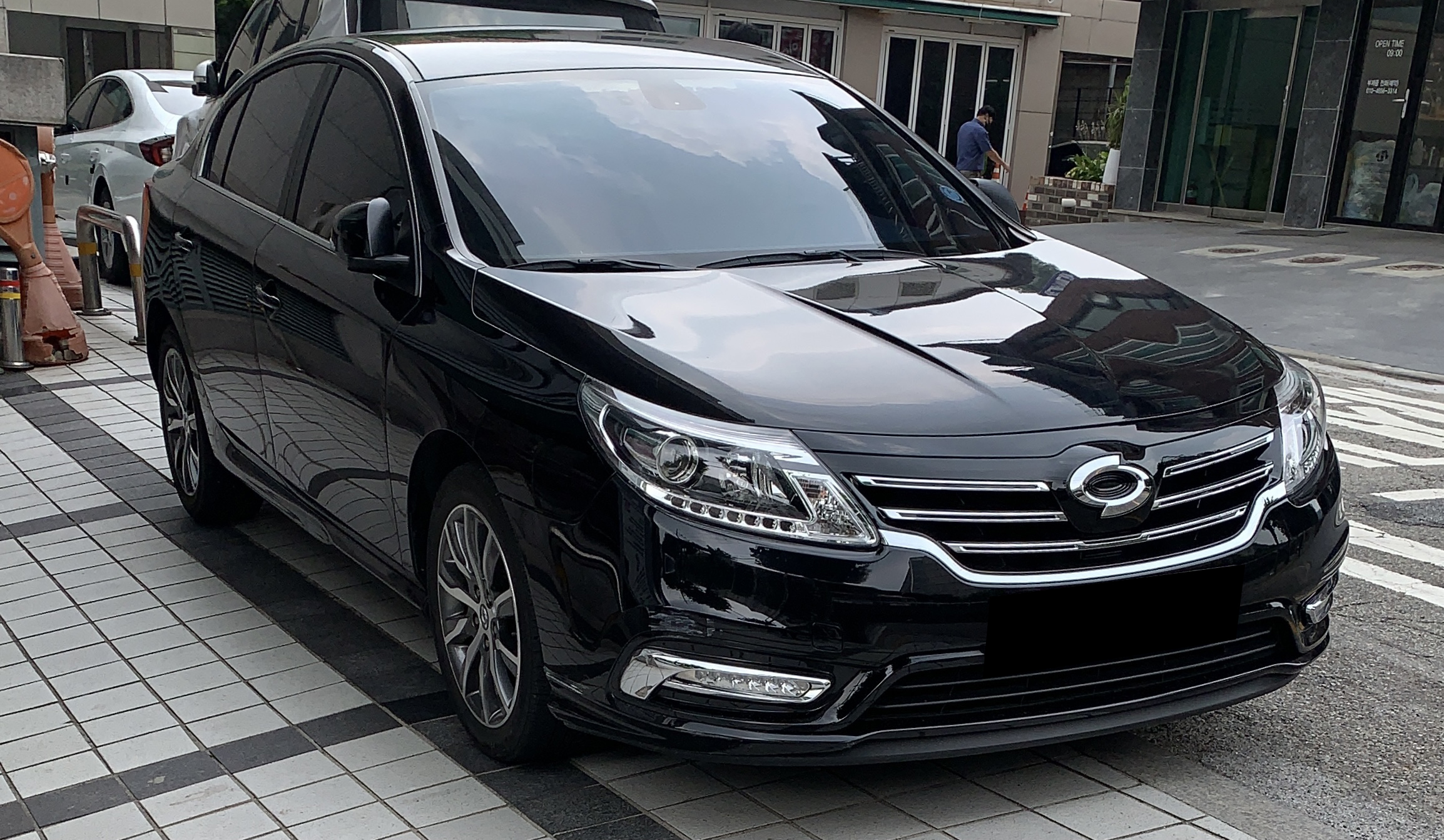
Renault Samsung SM5

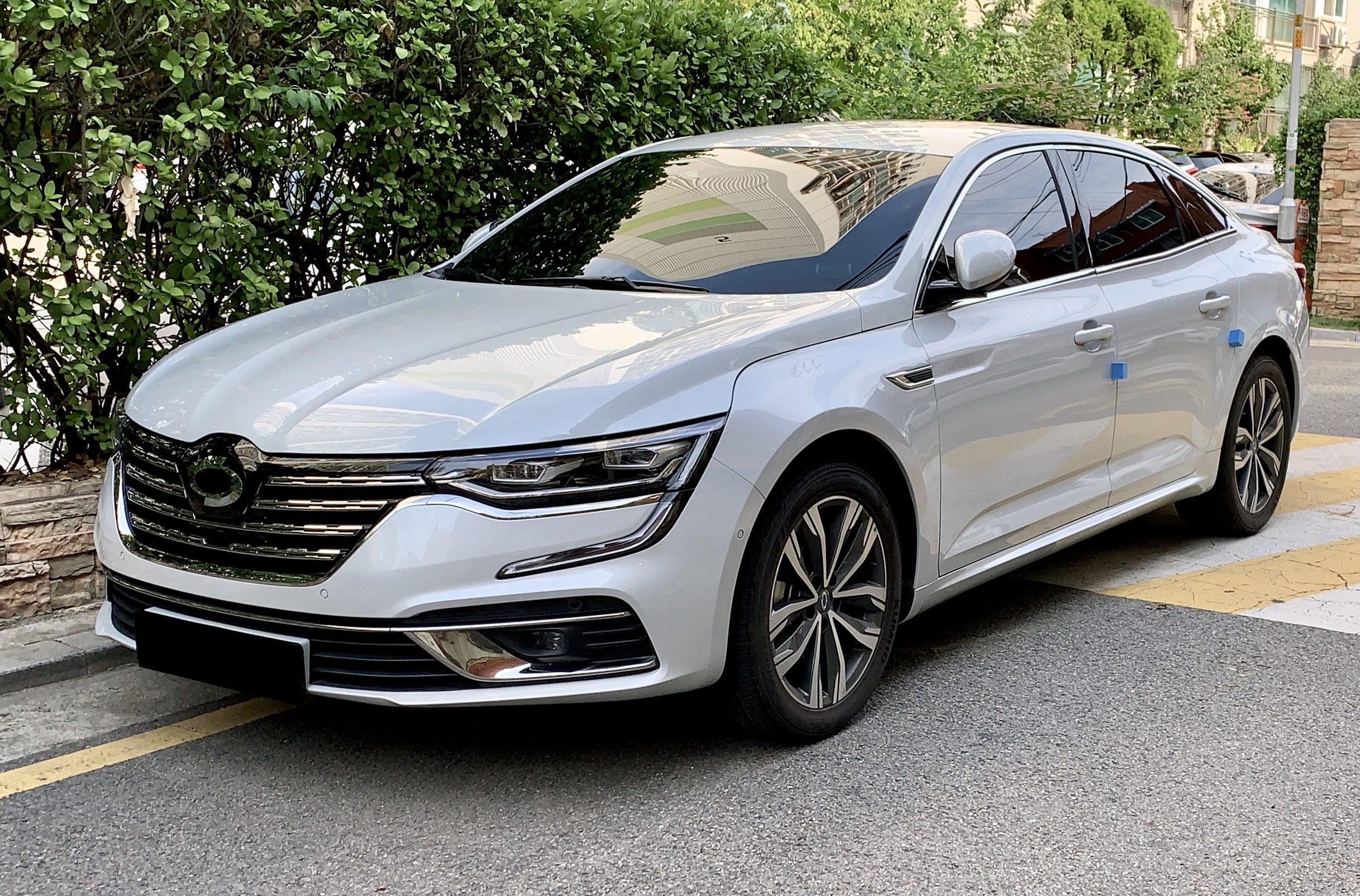
Renault SM6

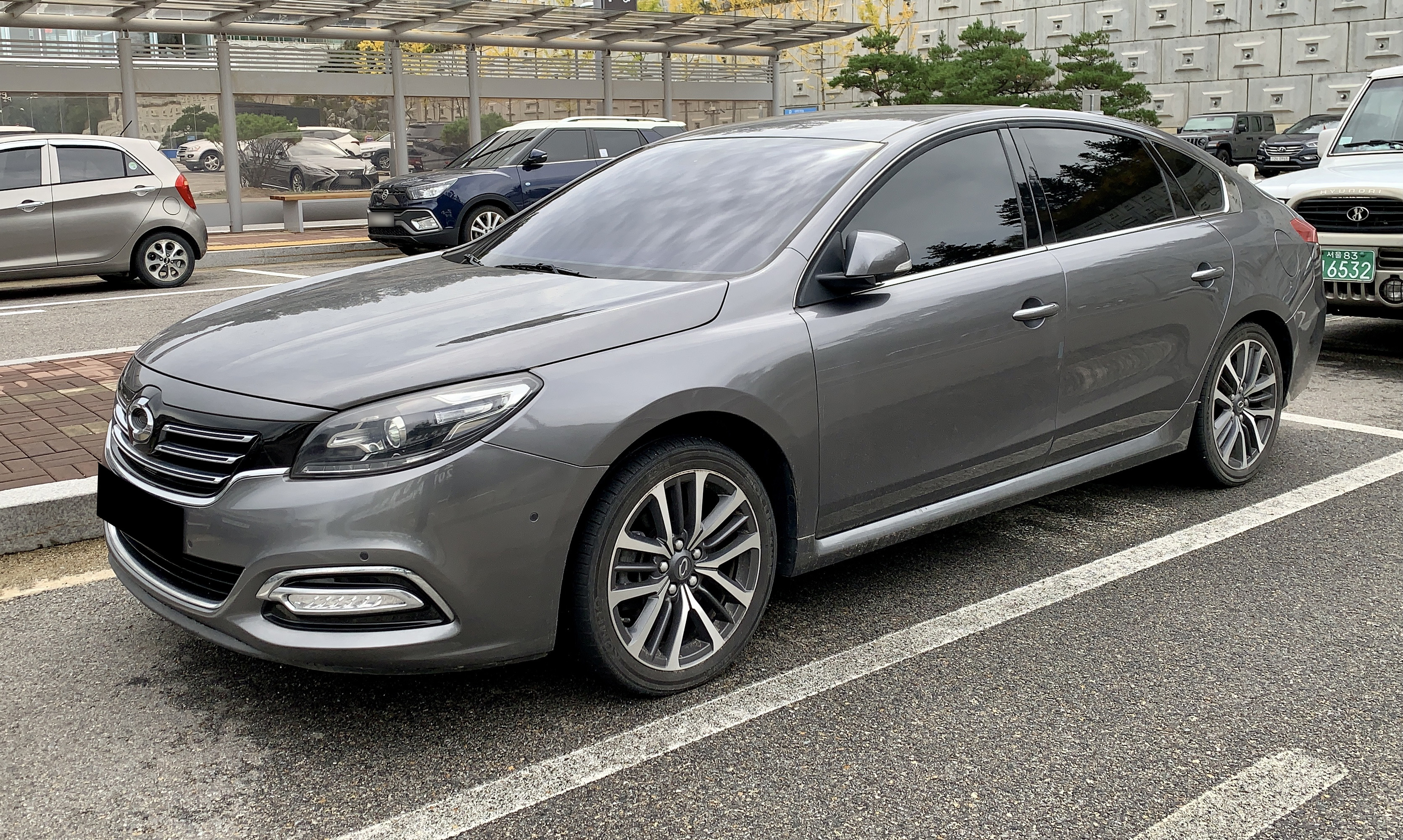
Renault Samsung SM7

== Contract manufacturing ==
The following models are assembled under contract for Renault Korea's parent company Renault, partner company Nissan, and Geely-affiliated Polestar.

=== Current models ===
- Polestar 4 (commenced in H2 2025)
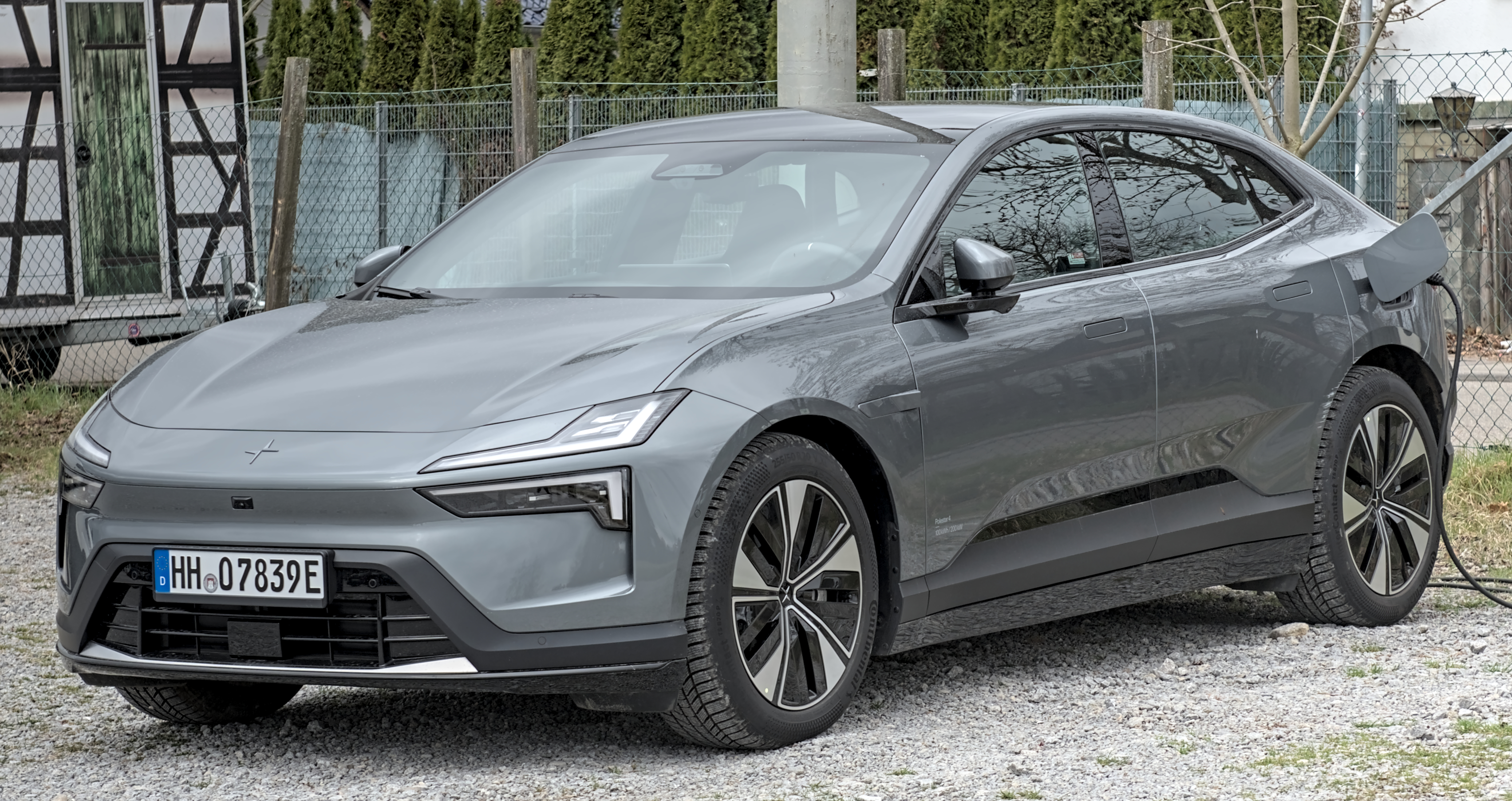
Polestar 4

=== Former models ===
- Nissan Rogue (2014–2020)
- Nissan Sunny/Almera Classic (2006–2013)
- Renault Fluence (2009–2019)
- Renault Latitude/Safrane (2010–2016)
- Renault Scala (2010–2013)
- Renault Talisman (2016–2023)
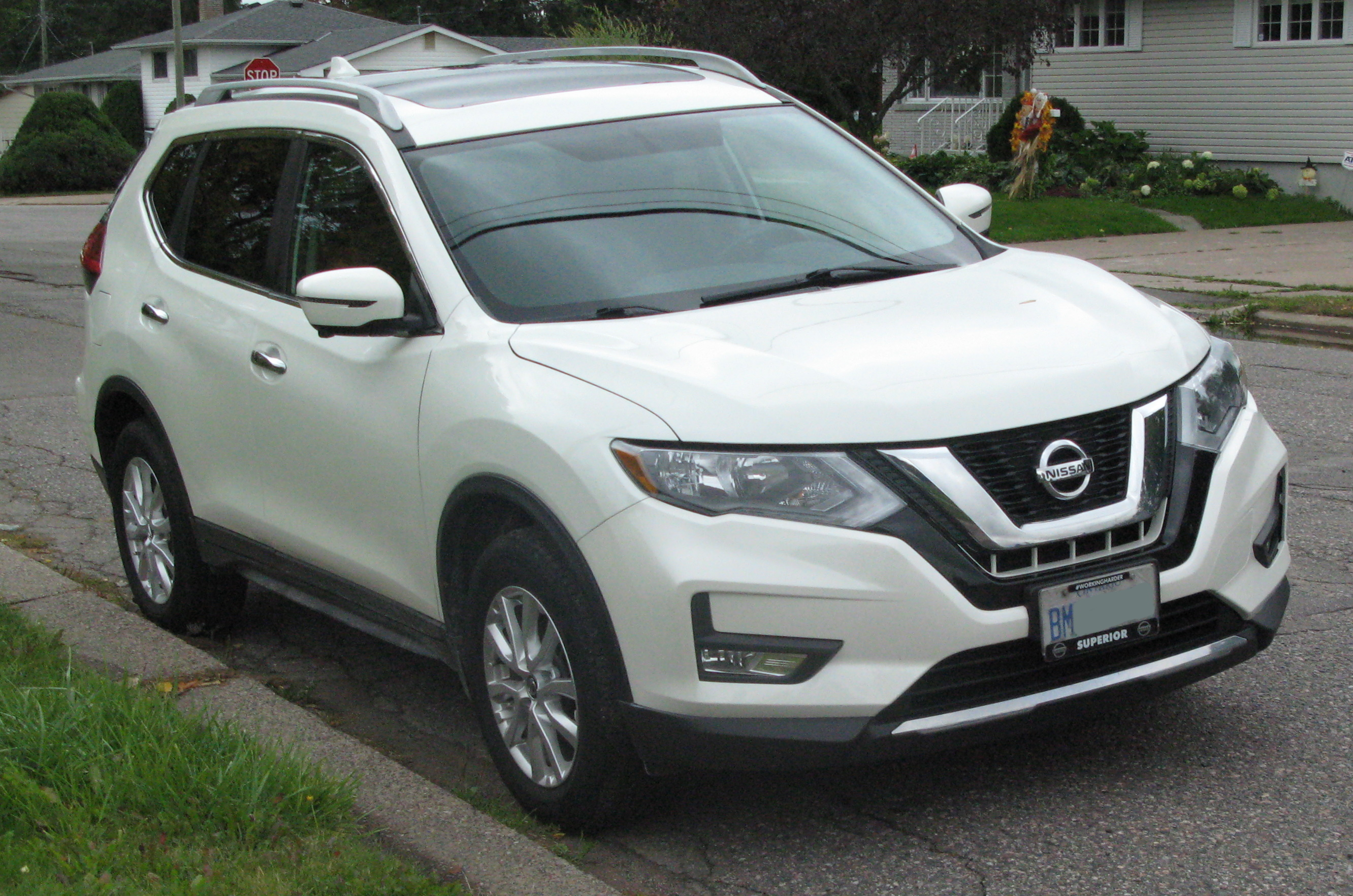
Nissan Rogue

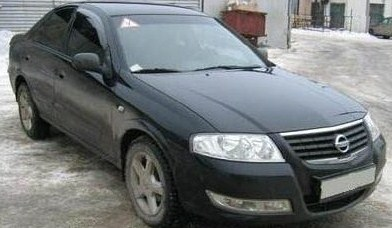
Nissan Sunny/Almera Classic

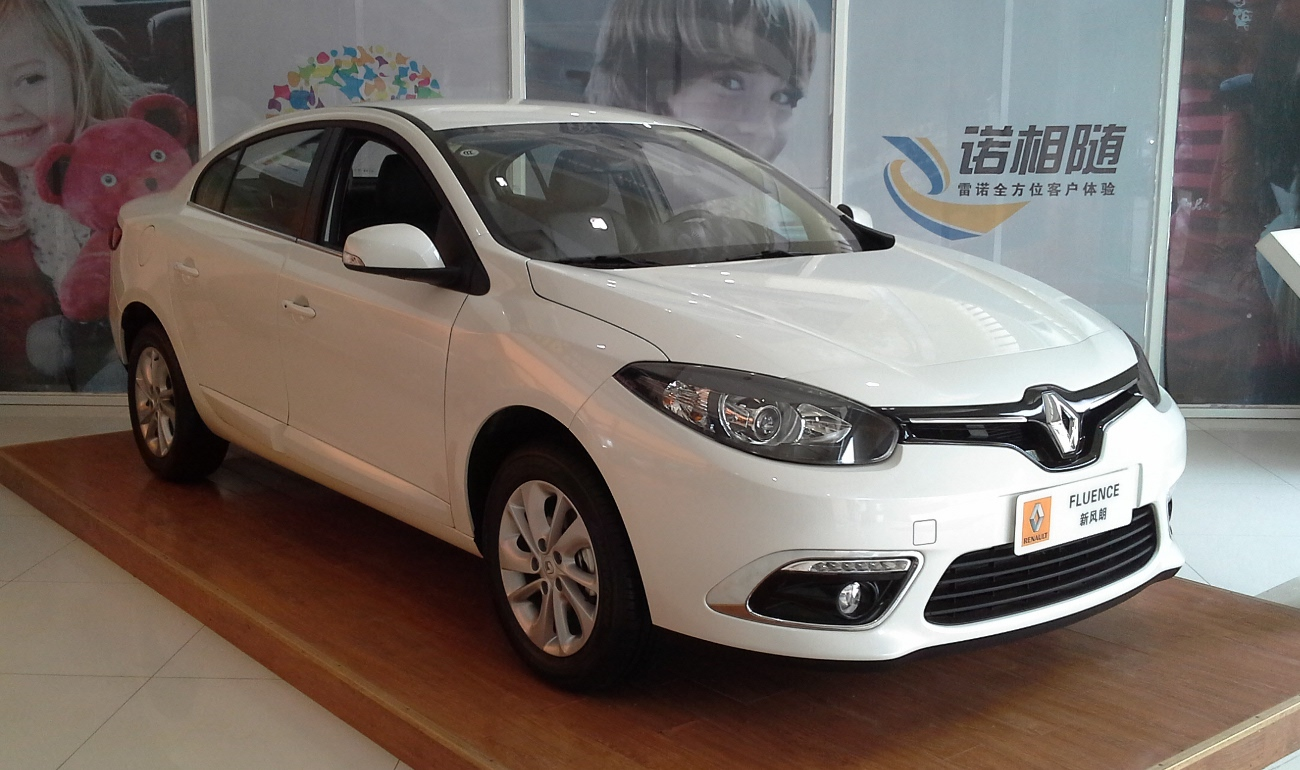
Renault Fluence

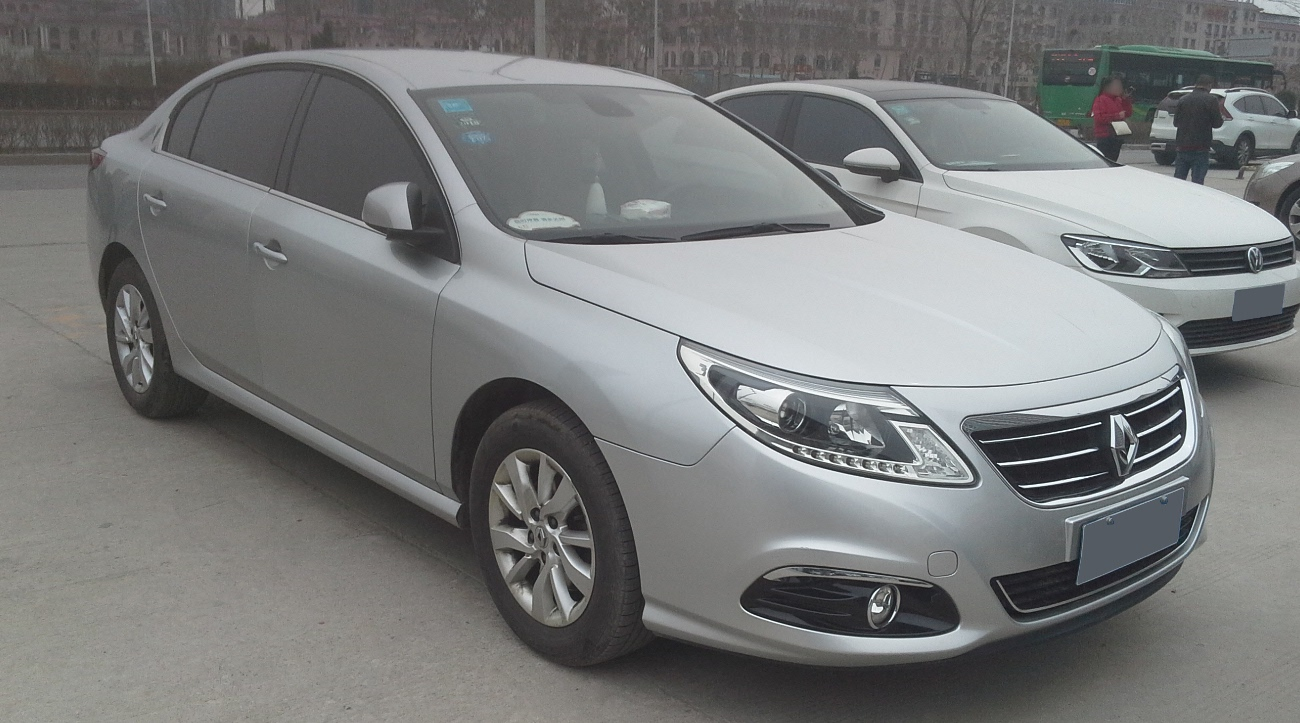
Renault Latitude/Safrane

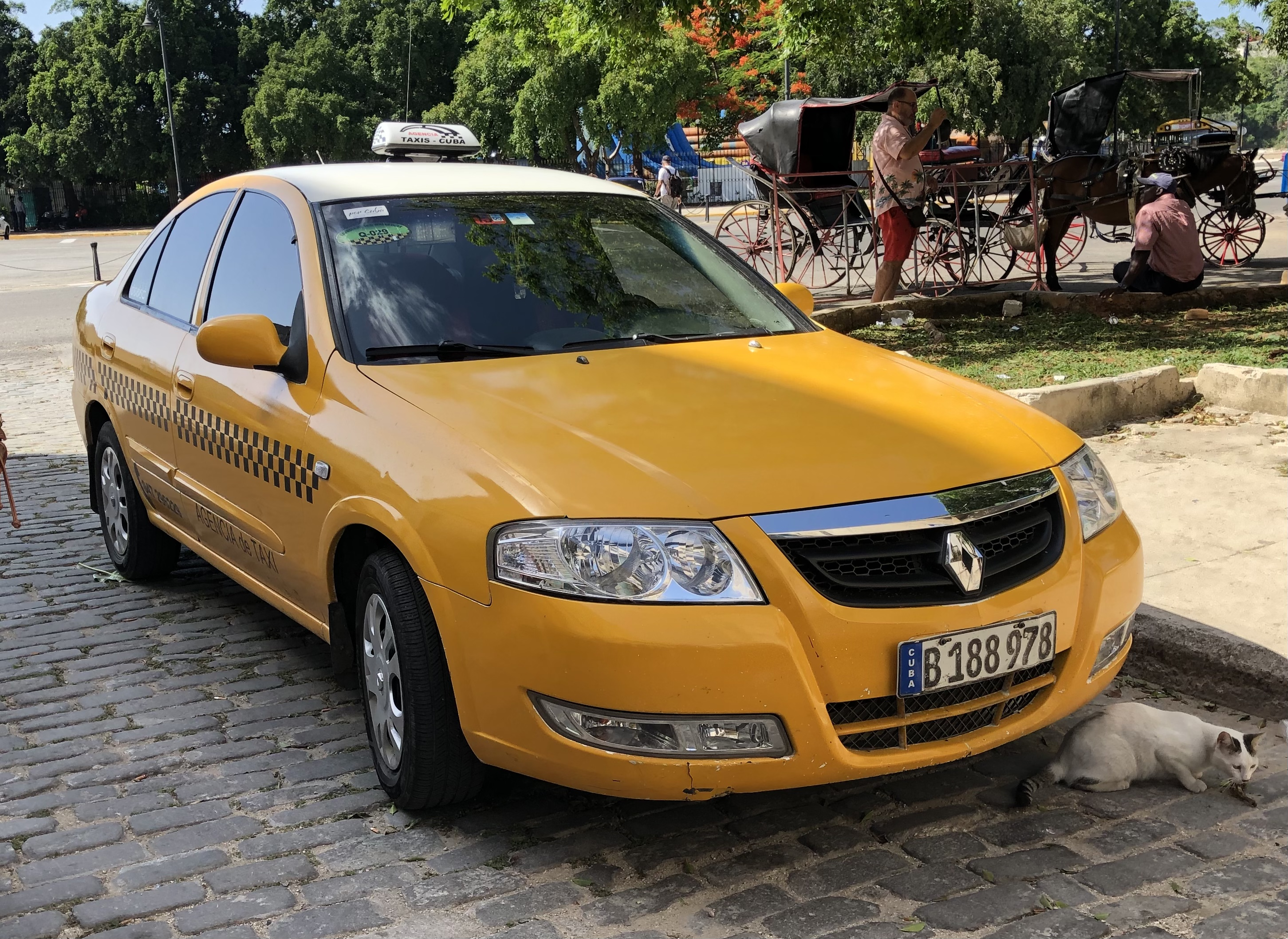
Renault Scala

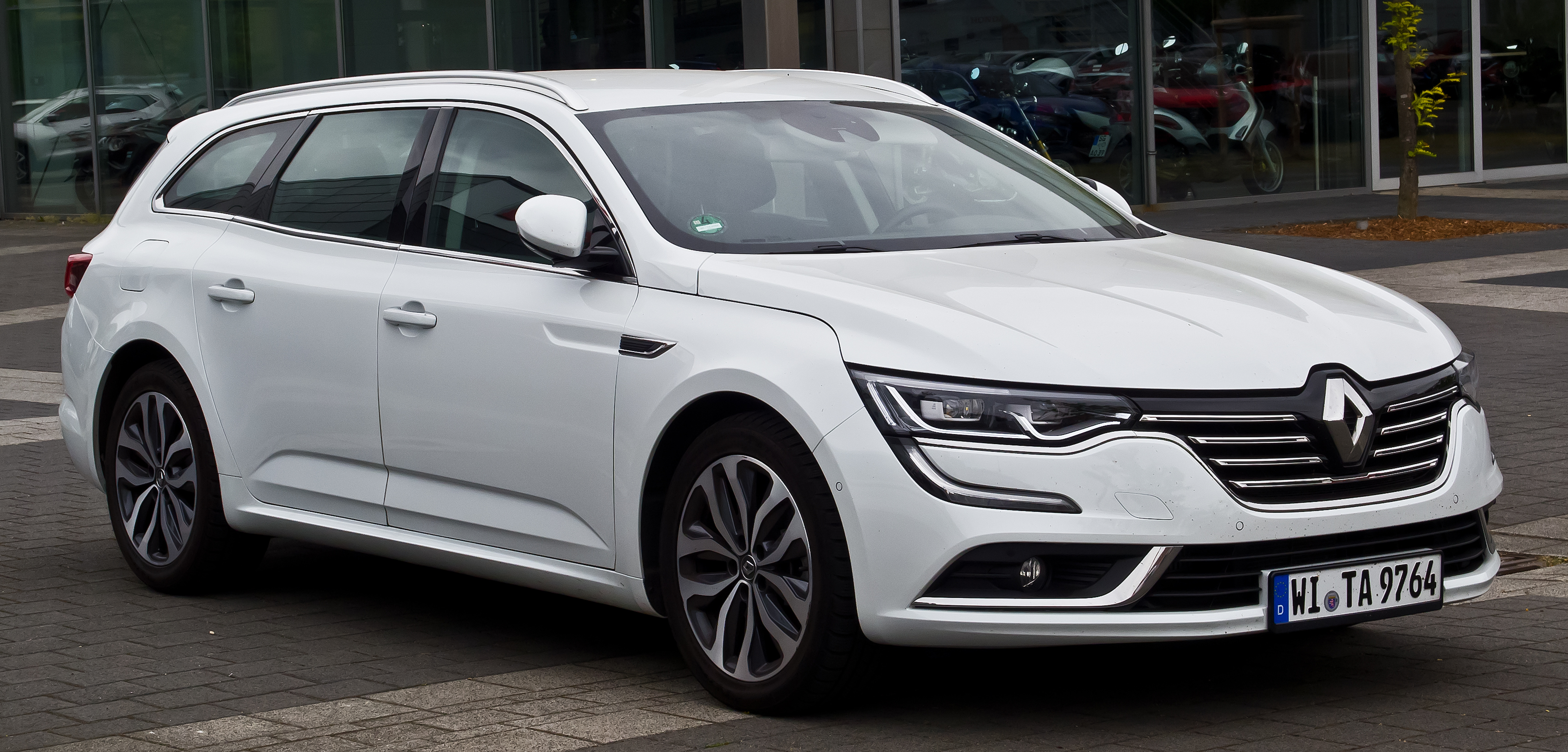
Renault Talisman
