= Renault Arkana =

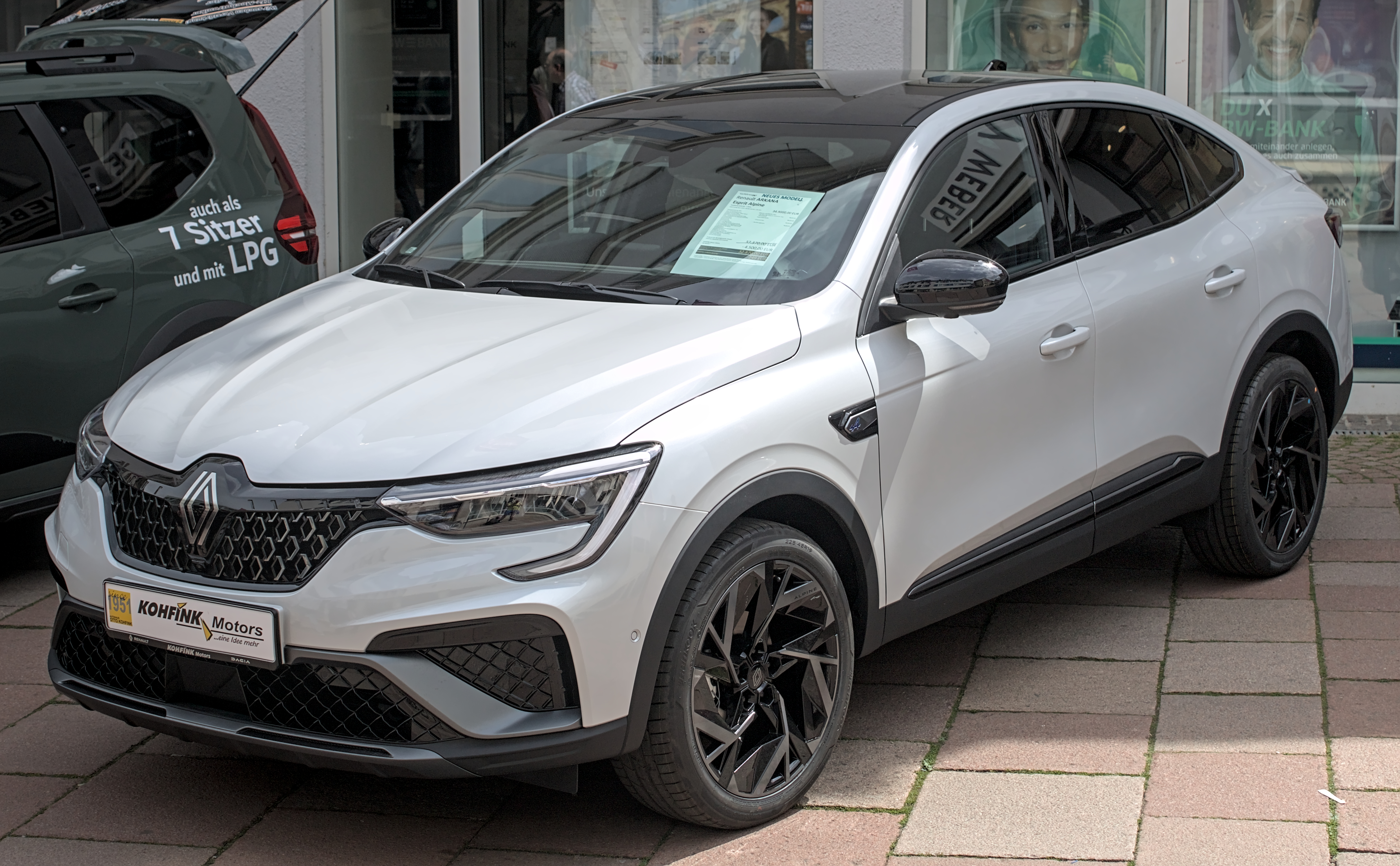
- 2024 Renault Arkana (facelift)

Overview
- Manufacturer: Renault
- Production: 2019–present

Body and chassis
- Class: Compact crossover SUV
- Body style: 5-door coupé SUV

The Renault Arkana (Note: Known as the Mégane Conquest in former Yugoslavian countries due to the name's similarity to Arkan, a Serbian mobster and paramilitary leader.) is a compact crossover SUV (C-segment) with a sloping rear roofline produced by the French manufacturer Renault. The car debuted in May 2019 in Russia as a car based on the older Dacia/Renault Duster B0 platform. Another separate version of the vehicle was introduced in South Korea in February 2020, and is based on a more advanced CMF-B platform. The latter version of the Arkana was later introduced in core European market in September 2020 and was marketed in South Korea as the Renault Samsung XM3 from 2020 to 2022 and then Renault XM3 from 2022 to 2024.

Renault stated the name "Arkana" derives from the Latin arcanum, meaning secret.

== Concept car ==
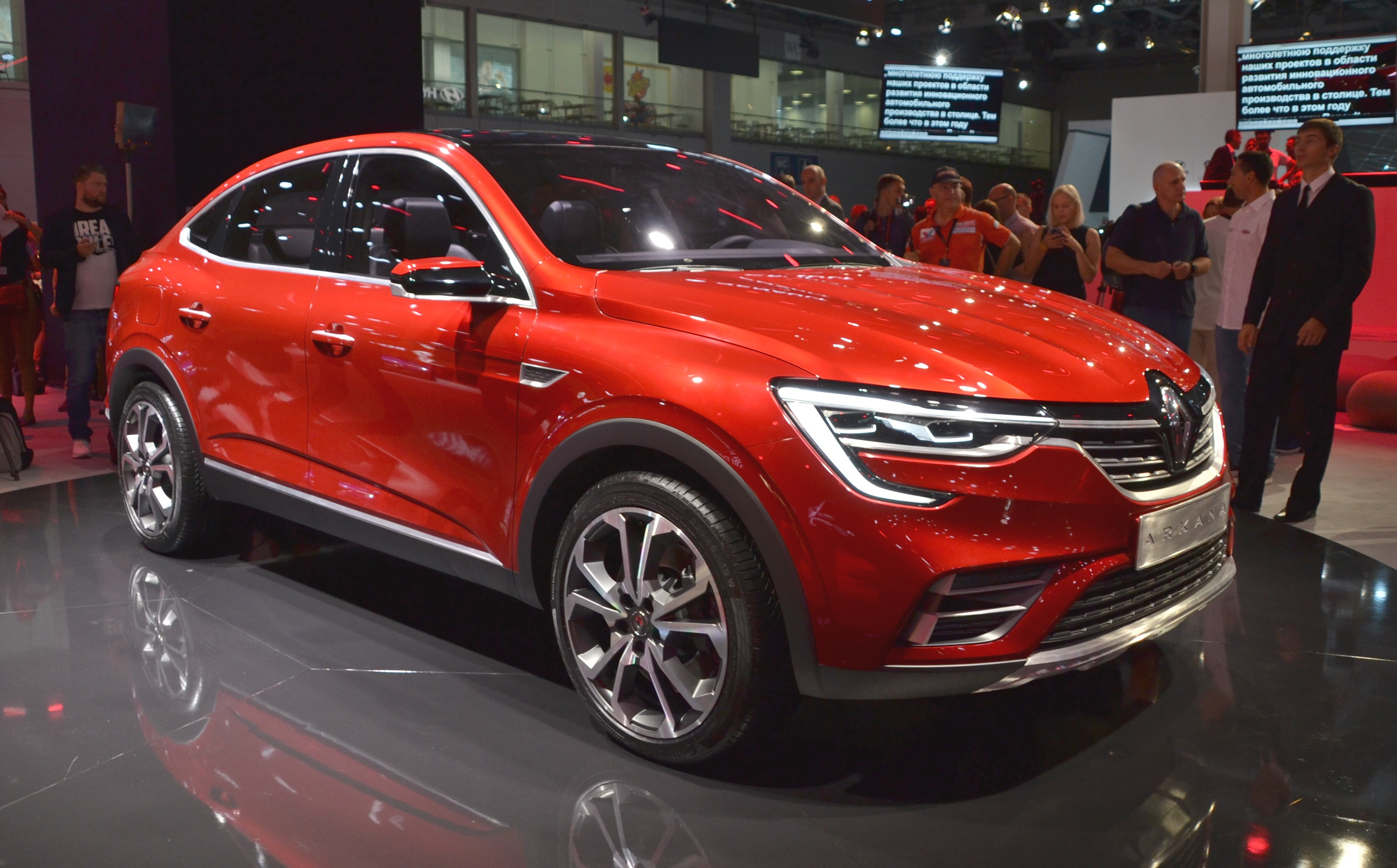
Renault Arkana Concept

A show car based on the Arkana, the XM3 Inspire, was introduced by Renault subsidiary Renault Samsung Motors and unveiled at the 2019 Seoul Motor Show. The main differences with the Arkana are a redesigned front grille, a different colour scheme and a revised bodywork.

== B0+ (LJC; 2019) ==
Renault Arkana (B0+)
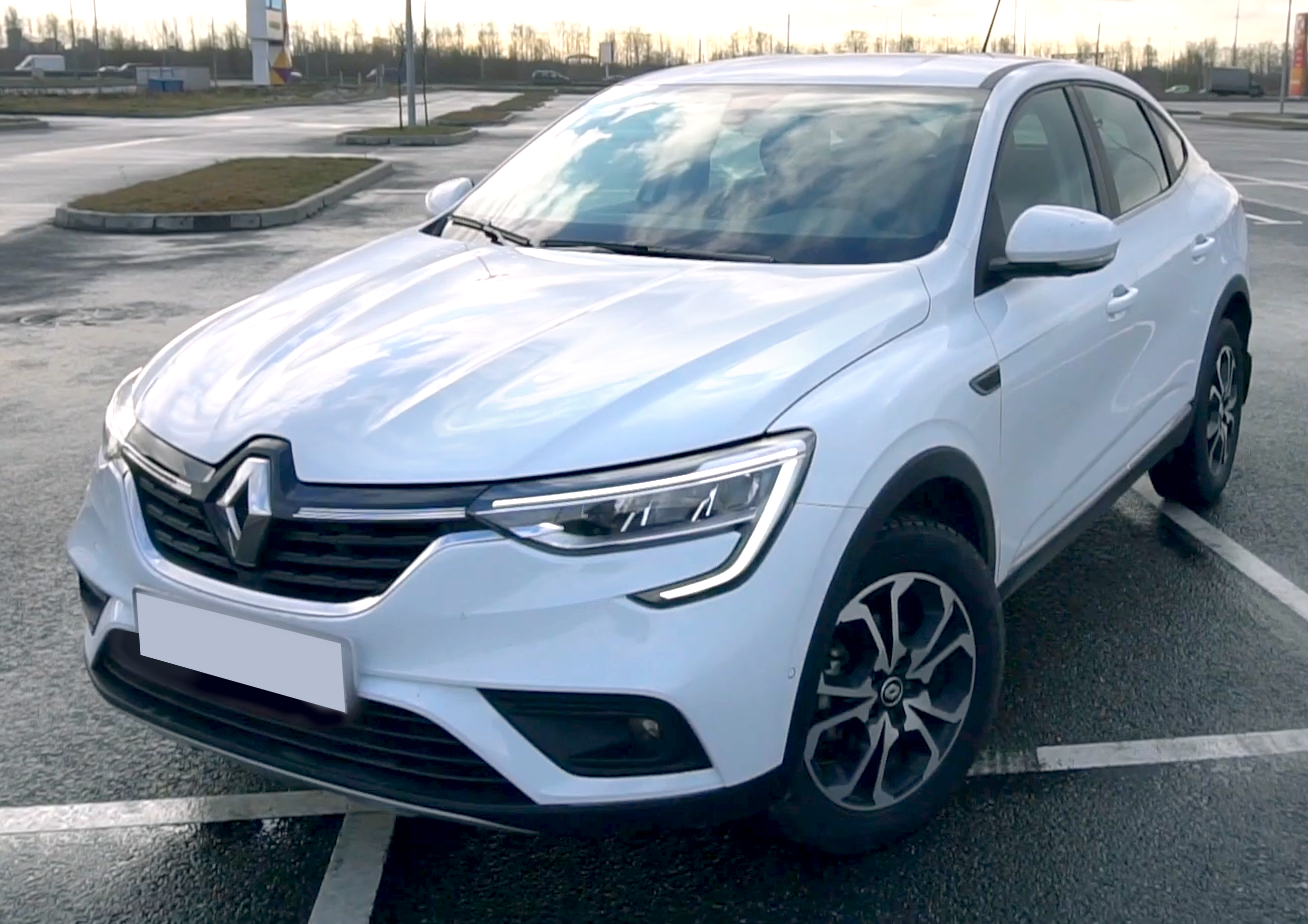
- 2020 Renault Arkana (Russia)

Overview
- Model code: LJC
- Production: 2019–2022 (Russia); 2020–2022 (Ukraine); 2021–2022 (Kazakhstan)
- Assembly: Russia: Moscow (Renault Russia); Ukraine: Zaporizhia (ZAZ); Kazakhstan: Kostanay (SaryarkaAvtoProm)
- Designer: Under the lead of Laurens van den Acker

Body and chassis
- Layout: Front-engine, front-wheel-drive Front-engine, four-wheel-drive
- Platform: B0+ platform
- Related: Renault Captur (Global Access); Dacia Duster (HM)

Powertrain
- Engine: Petrol: 1.3 TCe I4; 1.6 H4M I4
- Transmission: 5-speed manual 6-speed manual X-Tronic CVT

Dimensions
- Wheelbase: 2,720 mm (107.1 in)
- Length: 4,545 mm (178.9 in)
- Width: 1,820 mm (71.7 in)
- Height: 1,570 mm (61.8 in)

The Arkana was debuted in Russia in May 2019. For the Russian market, it is assembled by Renault Russia at its Moscow plant and its unveiling took place at the 2018 Moscow International Automobile Salon through a near-production showcar. The car has a coupe-like styling. The Russian Arkana is built on the Renault B0+ platform, a heavily revised variant of the B0 platform used by models such as the Captur and the Duster. The Russian model is using the 1.3-litre turbo petrol engine paired with Jatco CVT8 transmission.

=== Markets ===
==== Kazakhstan ====
Assembly in neighboring Kazakhstan began in 2021 at SaryarkaAvtoProm plant (Kostanay), through a partnership between Renault and the Allur Group.

LJC models production was prematurely stopped in 2022, following international sanctions against Russia after Russian invasion of Ukraine.

==== Ukraine ====
On September 16, 2020, the company announced that it will assemble the model in Ukraine.

== CMF-B (LJL; 2020) ==
Renault Arkana (CMF-B)
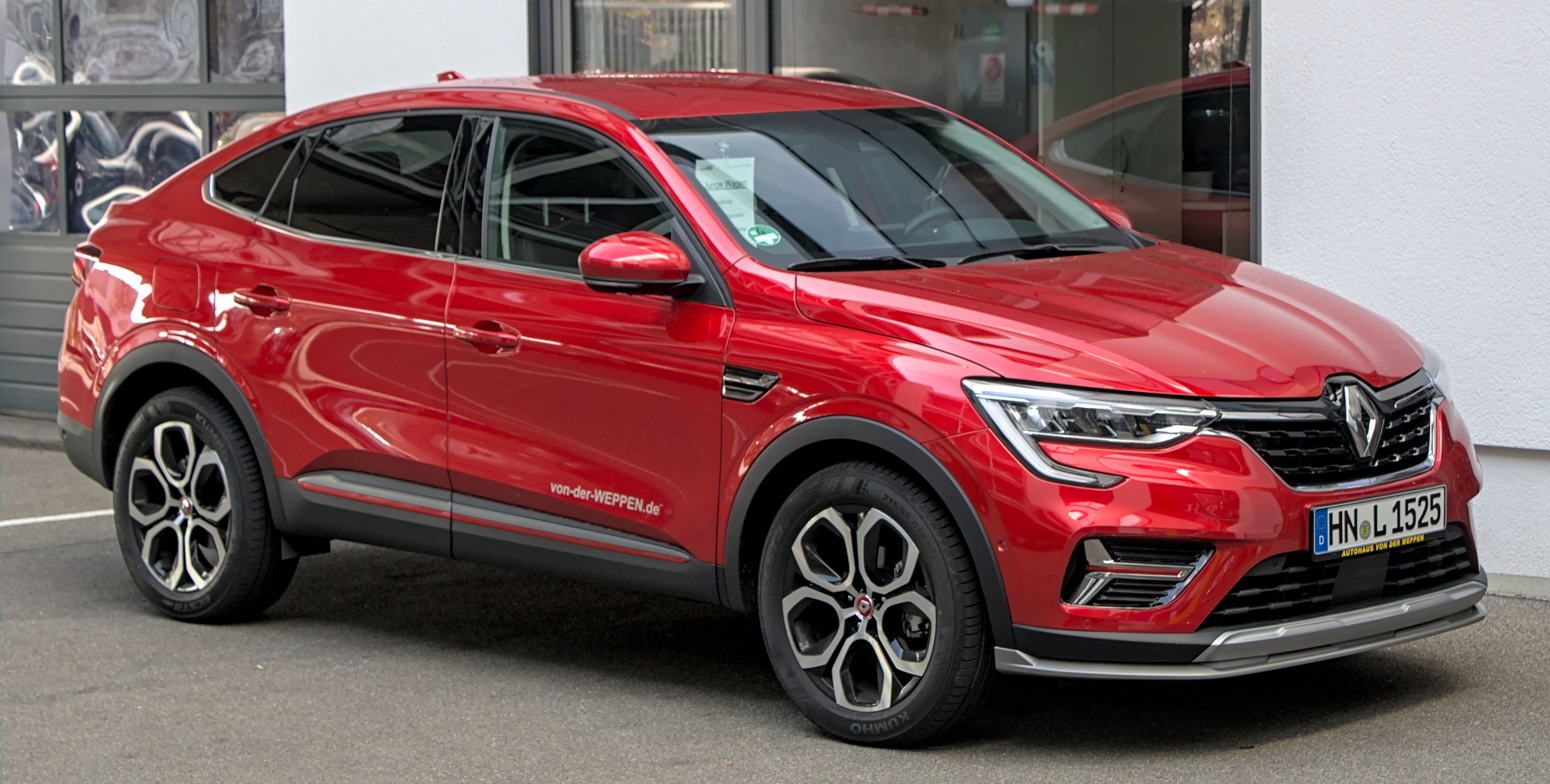
- 2020 Renault Arkana (Germany)

Overview
- Model code: LJL
- Also called: Renault Mégane Conquest (countries of former Yugoslavia); Renault Samsung XM3 (South Korea, 2020–2022); Renault XM3 (South Korea, 2022–2024)
- Production: 2020–present (South Korea, Japan); 2020–2026 (Europe); 2024–2025 (Iran)
- Assembly: South Korea: Busan (Renault Samsung Motors / Renault Korea); Iran: Salafchegan (Soroush Motor Mabna)
- Designer: David Durand

Body and chassis
- Layout: Front-engine, front-wheel-drive
- Platform: CMF-B HS platform
- Related: Renault Captur II; Renault Clio V

Powertrain
- Engine: Petrol: 1.3 L H5Ht I4 turbo Petrol hybrid: 1.6 L H4M I4
- Electric motor: 12V electric motor/generator micro-hybridization solution (μHEV); 2x PMSM's (E-Tech)
- Power output: 141 bhp; 143 PS (105 kW) (E-Tech Hybrid)
- Transmission: 6-speed manual 7-speed DCT
- Hybrid drivetrain: FHEV (E-Tech Hybrid) μHEV (1.3 turbo version)
- Battery: 1.2 kWh Li-ion (E-Tech Hybrid)

Dimensions
- Wheelbase: 2,720 mm (107.1 in)
- Length: 4,570 mm (179.9 in)
- Width: 1,820 mm (71.7 in)
- Height: 1,576 mm (62.0 in)
- Curb weight: 1,370–1,571 kg (3,020–3,463 lb)

The car was launched in South Korea as the Renault Samsung XM3. Instead of riding above the B0 platform like the Russian Arkana, the XM3 uses the modular platform CMF-B and is related to the second-generation Renault Captur. The XM3 is also purely a front-wheel drive car unlike its B0-based counterpart. The CMF-based variant is 25 mm longer than the B0-based Arkana sold in Russia. The South Korean model has two engine option either the 1.3-litre turbo petrol engine with 7-speed EDC gearbox or 1.6-litre petrol engine with Jatco CVT7 transmission.

In September 2020, the rebadged version of South Korean-made Samsung XM3 was also launched in Renault markets (outside of CIS) as the Renault Arkana. It is introduced in former Yugoslavian countries as the Renault Mégane Conquest, as its original name may be associated with Arkan, the late Serbian criminal, politician and paramilitary commander during the Yugoslav Wars who was accused of numerous war crimes.

The European model is equipped with a mild hybrid 1.3-litre turbo petrol engine paired with the 7-speed EDC gearbox.

The Renault Arkana arrived in Australia in August 2021.

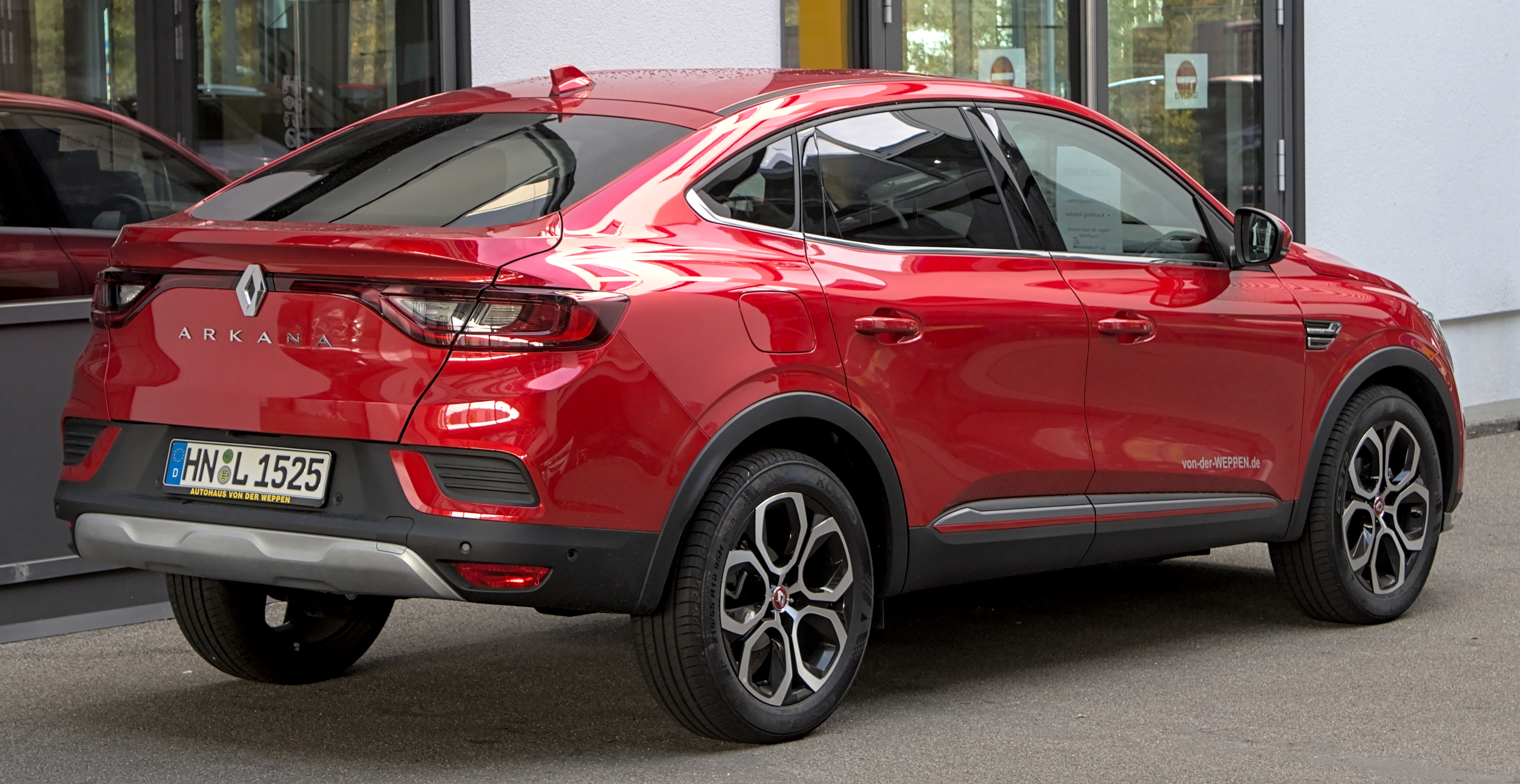
Rear view

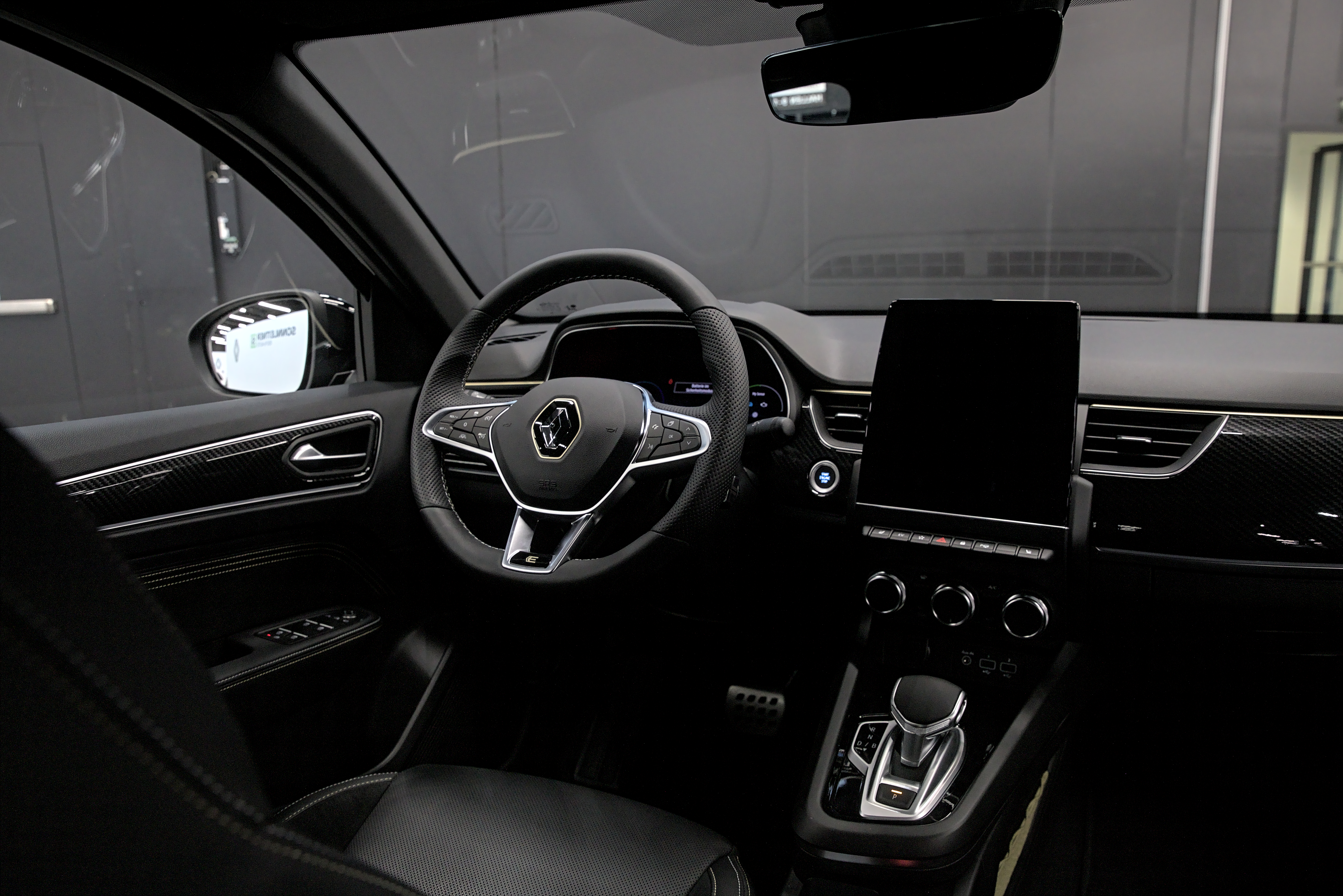
Interior

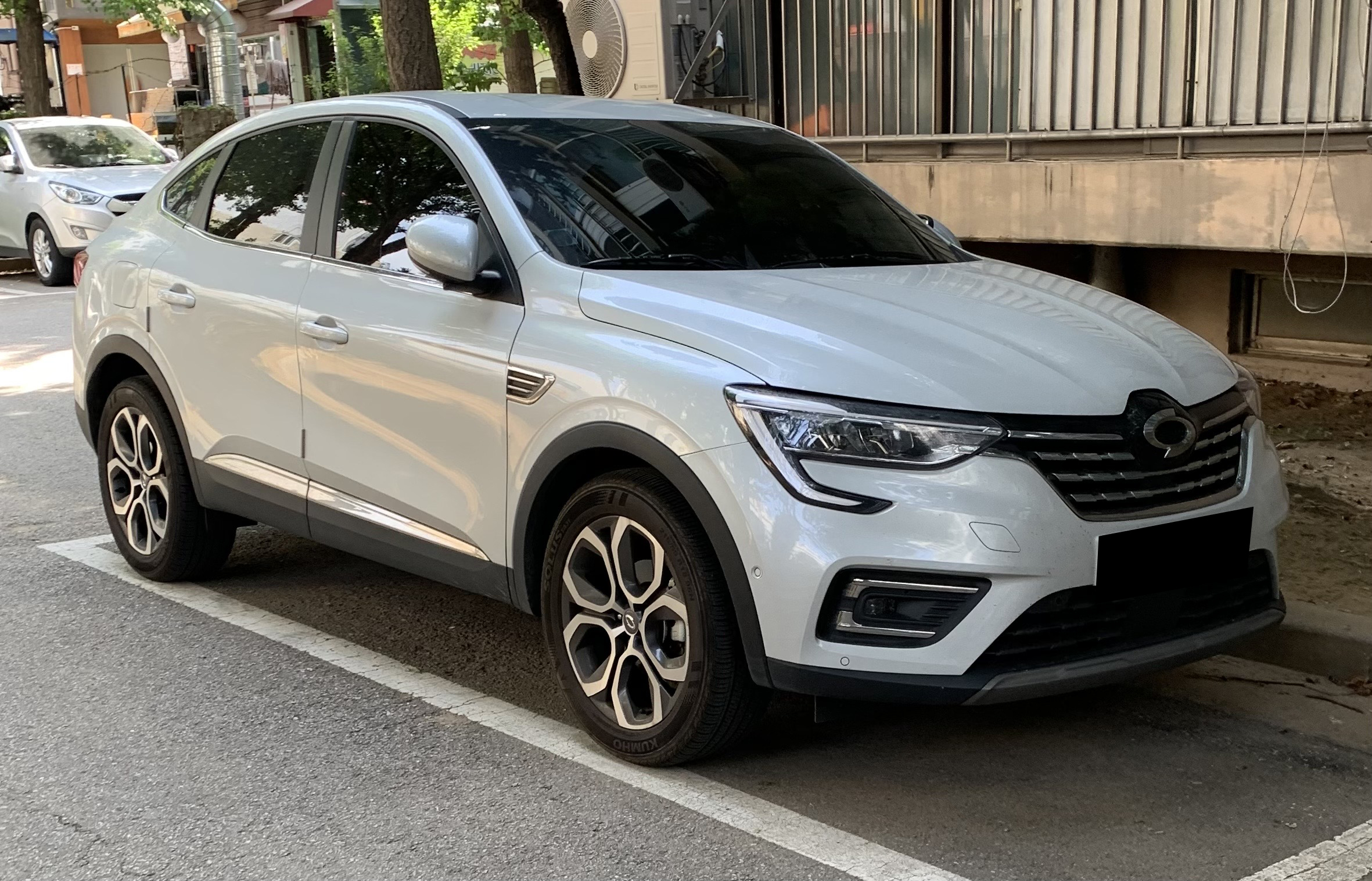
Renault Samsung XM3

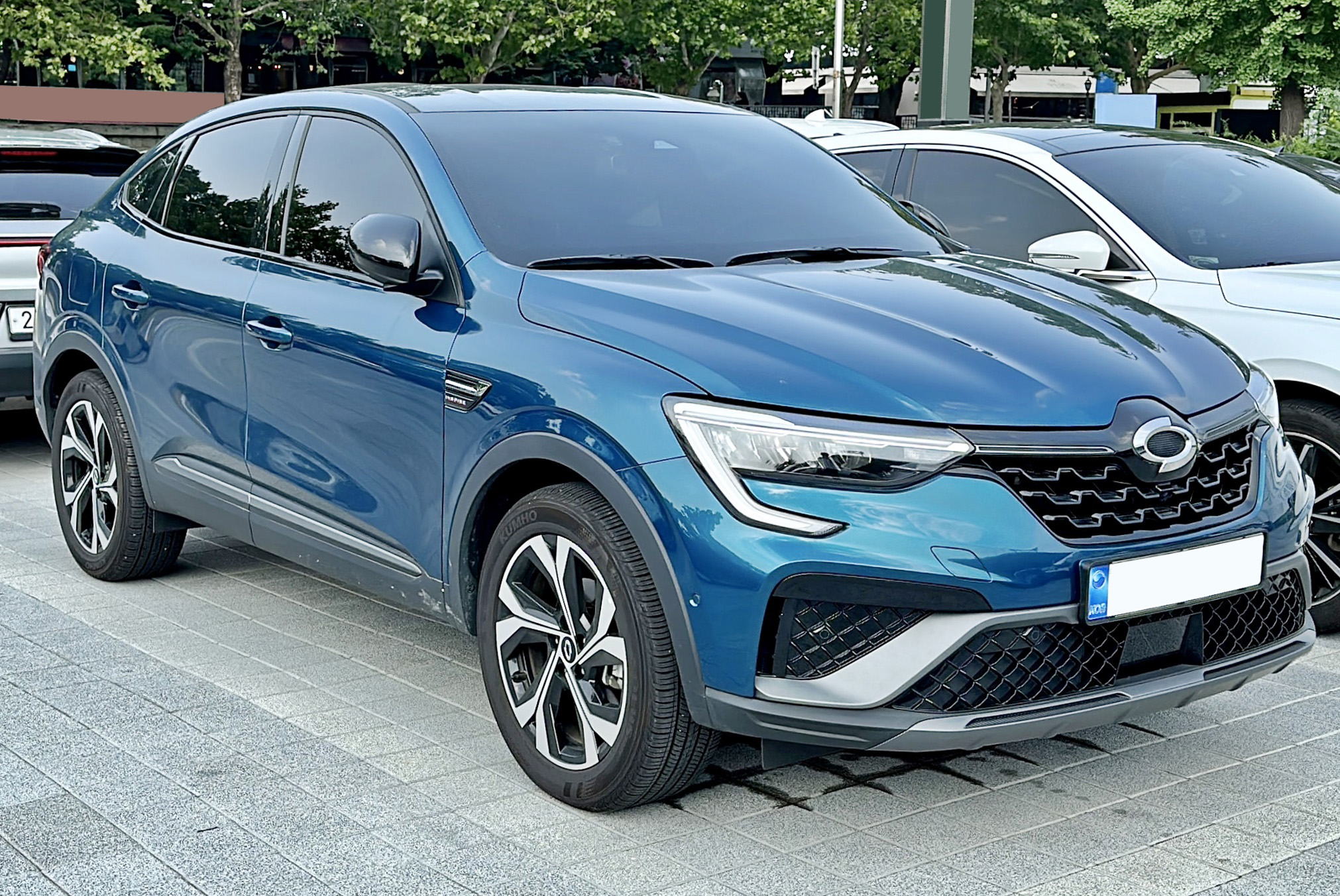
Renault Korea XM3 (sportline front shield)

=== Facelift ===
The vehicle received a facelift in July 2023, featuring among other things a new front grille and logo.

The facelifted Arkana was also introduced in the GCC countries on 2 September 2024.

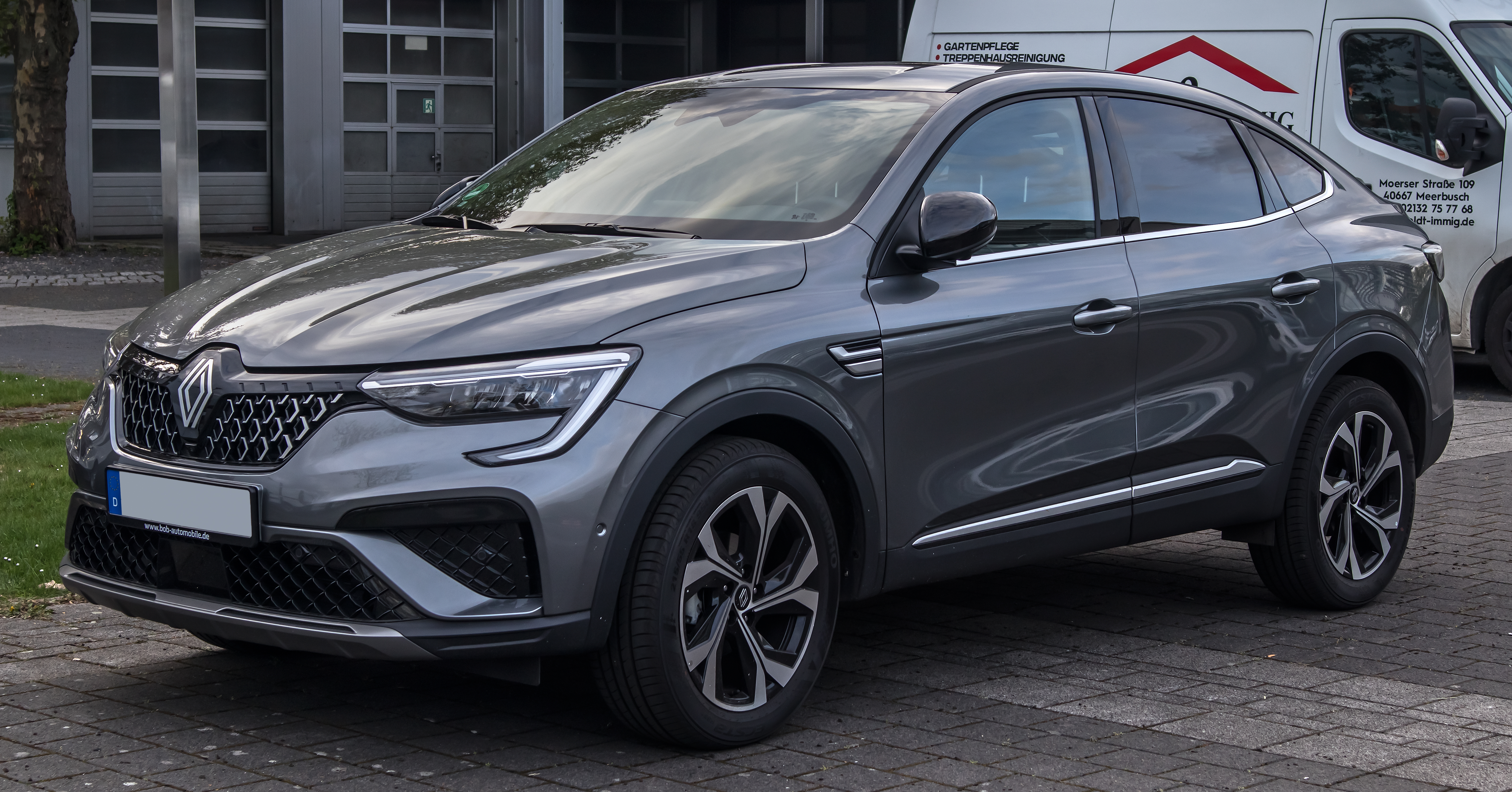
Renault Arkana (facelift)

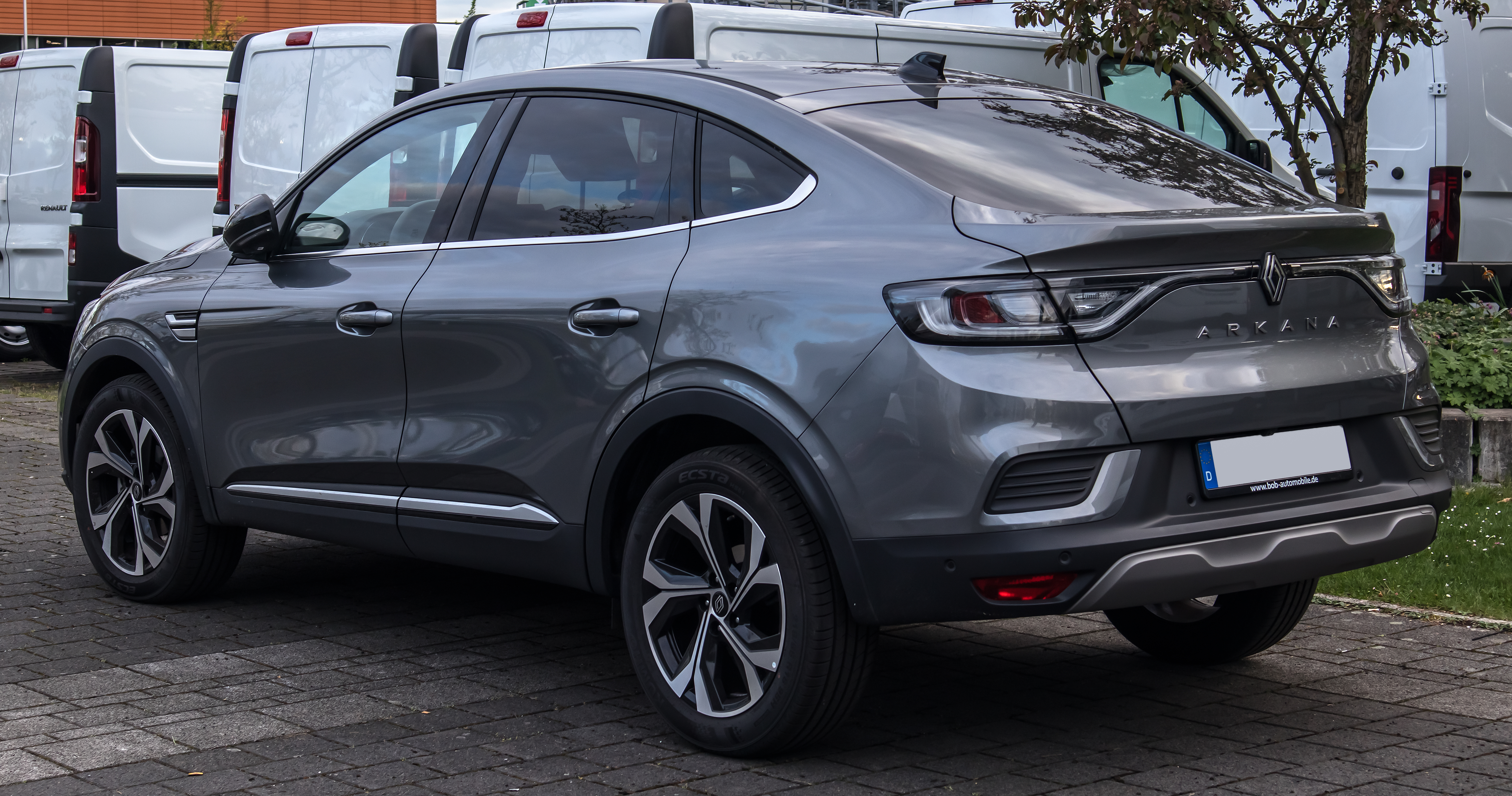
Rear view

=== Safety ===
ANCAP test results* Renault Arkana (2019, aligned with Euro NCAP)
Test	Points	%
Overall:	5 /5 stars	
Adult occupant:	36.8	96%
Child occupant:	42	85%
Pedestrian:	36.1	75%
Safety assist:	9.3	72%

== Sales and production ==
=== Sales ===
Year	Russia	Kazakhstan	Europe (Note: Europe: 2020 EU 27 + UK + Switzerland + Norway + Iceland)	Australia
2019	11,311	213		
2020	16,814	379		
2021	18,246	126	40,847	299
2022		268	80,643	308

=== Production figures ===
Year	South Korea
2020	37 554
2021	76 080
2022	118 488
2023	88 909
2024	68 410
2025	30,313
