= Renault Latitude =

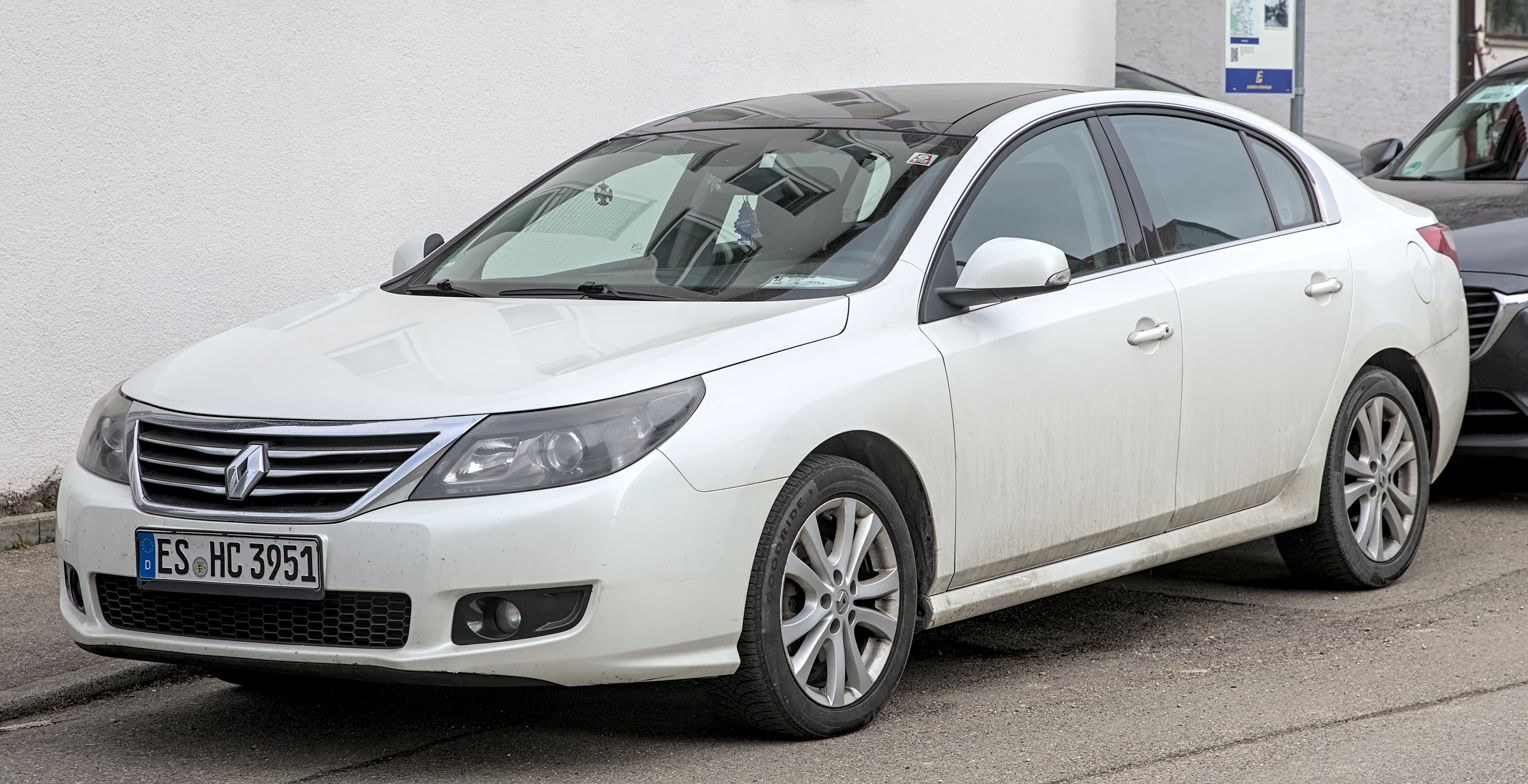

Overview
- Manufacturer: Renault
- Model code: X43
- Also called: Renault Samsung SM5 (South Korea); Renault Safrane (Mexico & GCC)
- Production: 2010–2015
- Assembly: South Korea: Busan (Renault Samsung); Russia: Moscow

Body and chassis
- Class: Large family car (D)
- Body style: 4-door saloon
- Layout: Front-engine, front-wheel-drive
- Platform: Renault–Nissan D platform
- Related: Renault Laguna III; Nissan Altima (L32); Nissan Teana (J32); Nissan Maxima (A35)

Powertrain
- Engine: petrol: 2.0 L Nissan M4R DOHC CVVTCS I4 16v; 2.5 L Nissan V4U DOHC VVT V6 24v; 3.5 L Nissan V4Y DOHC CVVTCS V6 24v; diesel: 1.5 L K9K dCi turbo SOHC 8v I4; 2.0 L Renault-Nissan M9R dCi turbo DOHC 16v I4; 3.0 L Renault-Nissan V9X dCi turbo DOHC 24v V6
- Transmission: 6-speed manual 6-speed EDC; X-Tronic CVT; 6-speed BVA

Dimensions
- Wheelbase: 2,760 mm (108.7 in)
- Length: 4,897 mm (192.8 in)
- Width: 1,832 mm (72.1 in)
- Height: 1,483 mm (58.4 in)
- Curb weight: 1,602–1,655 kg (3,531.8–3,648.7 lb)

Chronology
- Predecessor: Renault Vel Satis; Renault Laguna (Australia)
- Successor: Renault Talisman (Europe)

The Renault Latitude is an executive car produced by the French automaker Renault, and announced in June 2010. It debuted at the Moscow International Automobile Salon, at the end of August 2010. The Latitude served as the company's flagship vehicle, before it was replaced in 2016 by the Renault Talisman.

== Design ==
The Latitude is a four-door saloon based on the Renault–Nissan D platform, and already developed as the third generation (L43) Renault Samsung SM5. The Latitude was facelifted for 2015, with a new rear fascia.

== Marketing ==
The Latitude is the successor to the Renault Vel Satis, which went out of production in August 2009. Sales of Renault Latitude began in Asia, Australia and Eastern Europe in the autumn of 2010. In Mexico, it was launched during the first quarter of 2011 as the Renault Safrane.

The European version of the Latitude, with full details of the model's equipment lists and engines ranges, was shown at the 2010 Paris Motor Show, and sales in Western Europe began in the beginning of 2011, but not in the United Kingdom.

The Latitude is used as a taxi in Singapore and Macau with those sedans being made by Renault Samsung Motors and badged as Renault vehicles.

The vehicle was replaced alongside the Laguna by the Talisman, announced during a 2015 press conference in France.

== Engines ==
Petrol
| Model | Engine | Power/rpm | Torque/rpm | 0–62 mph (0–100 km/h) | Top speed | Economy | CO2 | Note |
|---|---|---|---|---|---|---|---|---|
| 2.0 16v | 1,997 cc (122 cu in) DOHC I4 | 140 PS (103 kW; 138 hp) at 6000 | 194 N⋅m (143 lb⋅ft) at 3750 | 10.7 sec | 121 mph (195 km/h) | 29.7 mpg_{‑imp} (10 L/100 km) | 181 g/km | |
| 2.5 24v | 2,496 cc (152 cu in) DOHC V6 | 180 PS (132 kW; 178 hp) at 6000 | 235 N⋅m (173 lb⋅ft) at 4400 | 9.3 sec | 129 mph (208 km/h) | 29.1 mpg_{‑imp} (10 L/100 km) | 230 g/km | |
| 3.5 24v | 3,498 cc (213 cu in) DOHC V6 | 240 PS (177 kW; 237 hp) at 6000 | 330 N⋅m (243 lb⋅ft) at 4200 | 6.4 sec | 155 mph (249 km/h) | 30.7 mpg_{‑imp} (9 L/100 km) | 250 g/km | |
Diesel
| Model | Engine | Power/rpm | Torque/rpm | 0–62 mph (0–100 km/h) | Top speed | Economy | CO2 | Note |
| 1.5 dCi | 1,461 cc (89 cu in) SOHC I4 | 110 PS (81 kW; 108 hp) at 4000 | 240 N⋅m (177 lb⋅ft) at 1750 | 12.4 sec | 116 mph (187 km/h) | 56.4 mpg_{‑imp} (5 L/100 km) | 129 g/km | |
| 2.0 dCi | 1,995 cc (122 cu in) DOHC I4 | 150 PS (110 kW; 148 hp) at 4000 | 340 N⋅m (251 lb⋅ft) at 2000 | 10.3 sec | 129 mph (208 km/h) | 53.3 mpg_{‑imp} (5 L/100 km) | 140 g/km | eco^{2} |
| 2.0 dCi | 1,995 cc (122 cu in) DOHC I4 | 175 PS (129 kW; 173 hp) at 3750 | 360 N⋅m (266 lb⋅ft) at 2000 | 9.9 sec | 127 mph (204 km/h) | 43.5 mpg_{‑imp} (6 L/100 km) | 170 g/km | |
| 3.0 dCi | 2,993 cc (183 cu in) DOHC V6 | 240 PS (177 kW; 237 hp) at 3750 | 450 N⋅m (332 lb⋅ft) at 1500 | 7.6 sec | 146 mph (235 km/h) | 39.2 mpg_{‑imp} (7 L/100 km) | 188 g/km | |

== Gallery ==
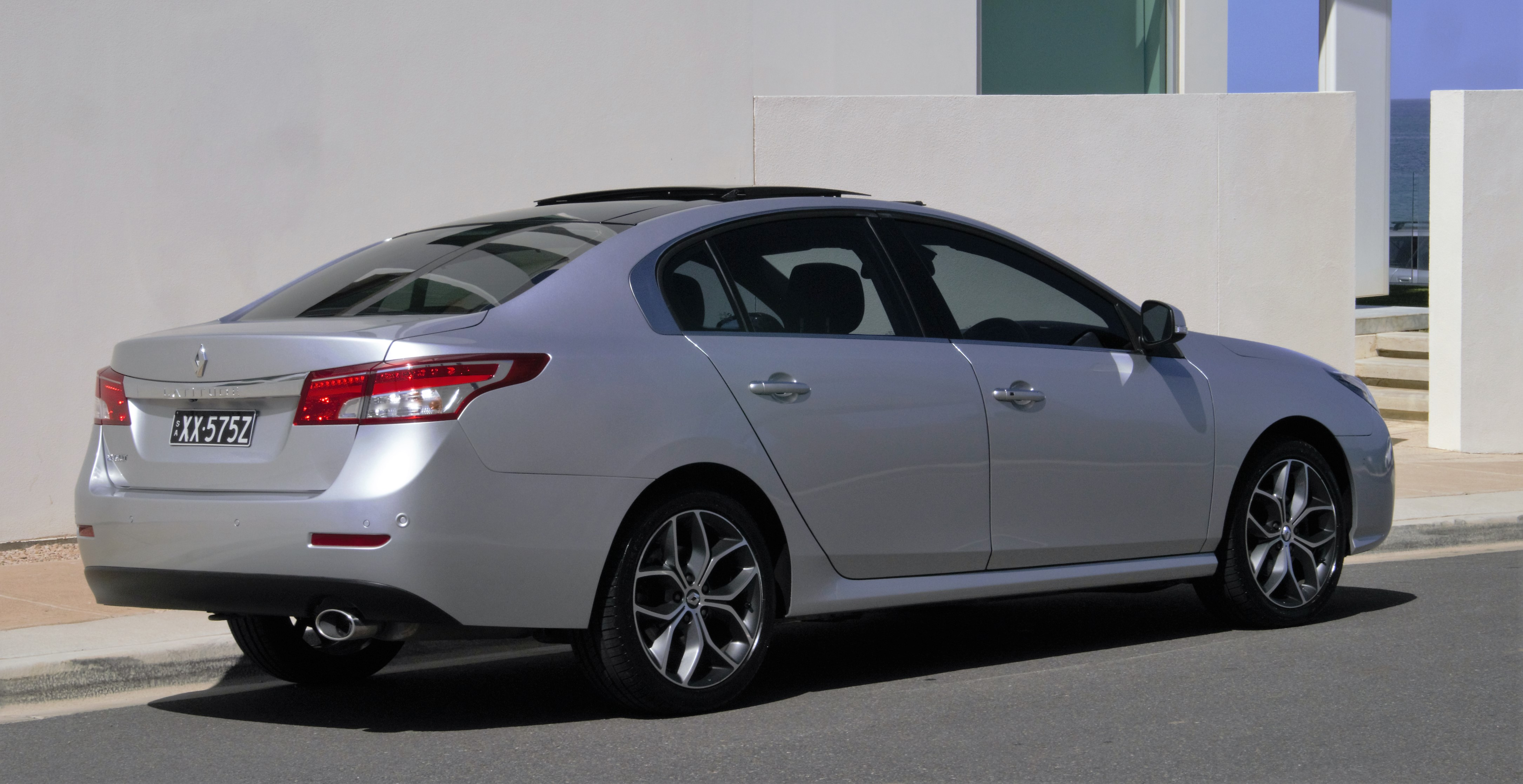
Renault Latitude Privilege dCi (Australia; pre facelift)

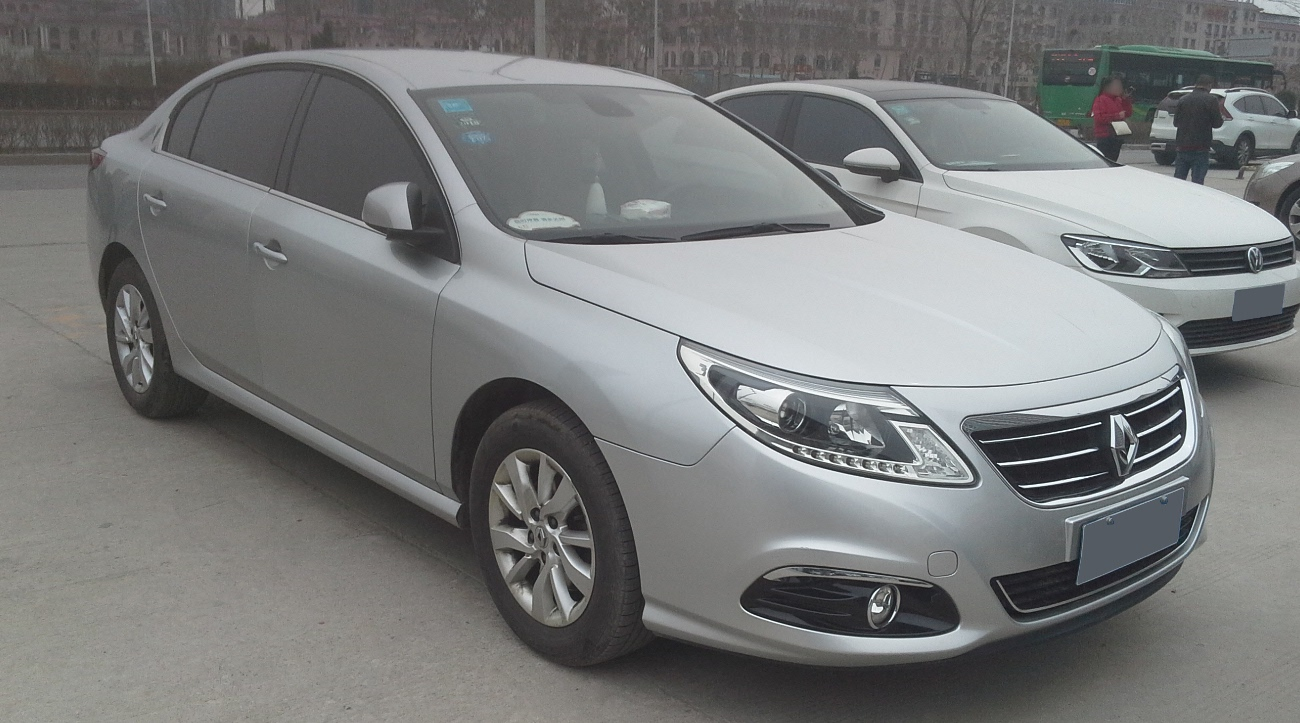
Renault Latitude (China; facelift)

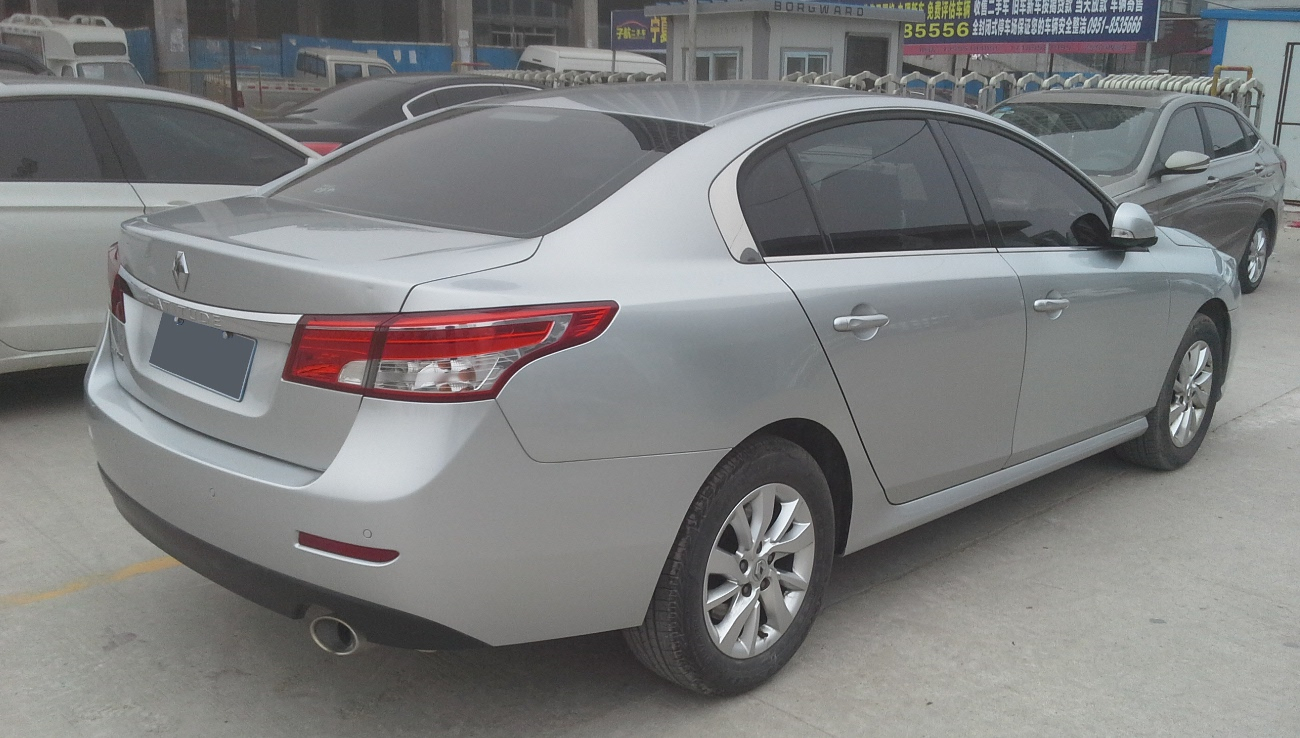
Renault Latitude (China; facelift)

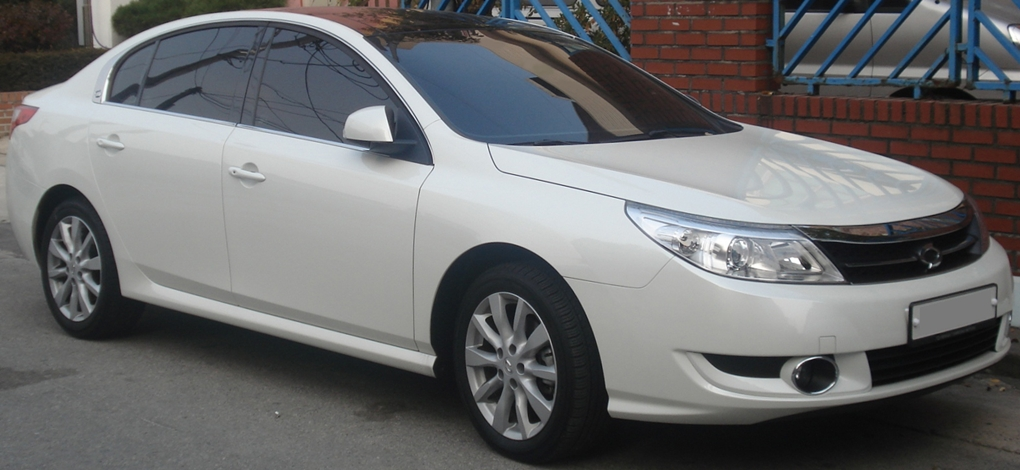
Renault Samsung SM5
