= Renault Safrane =

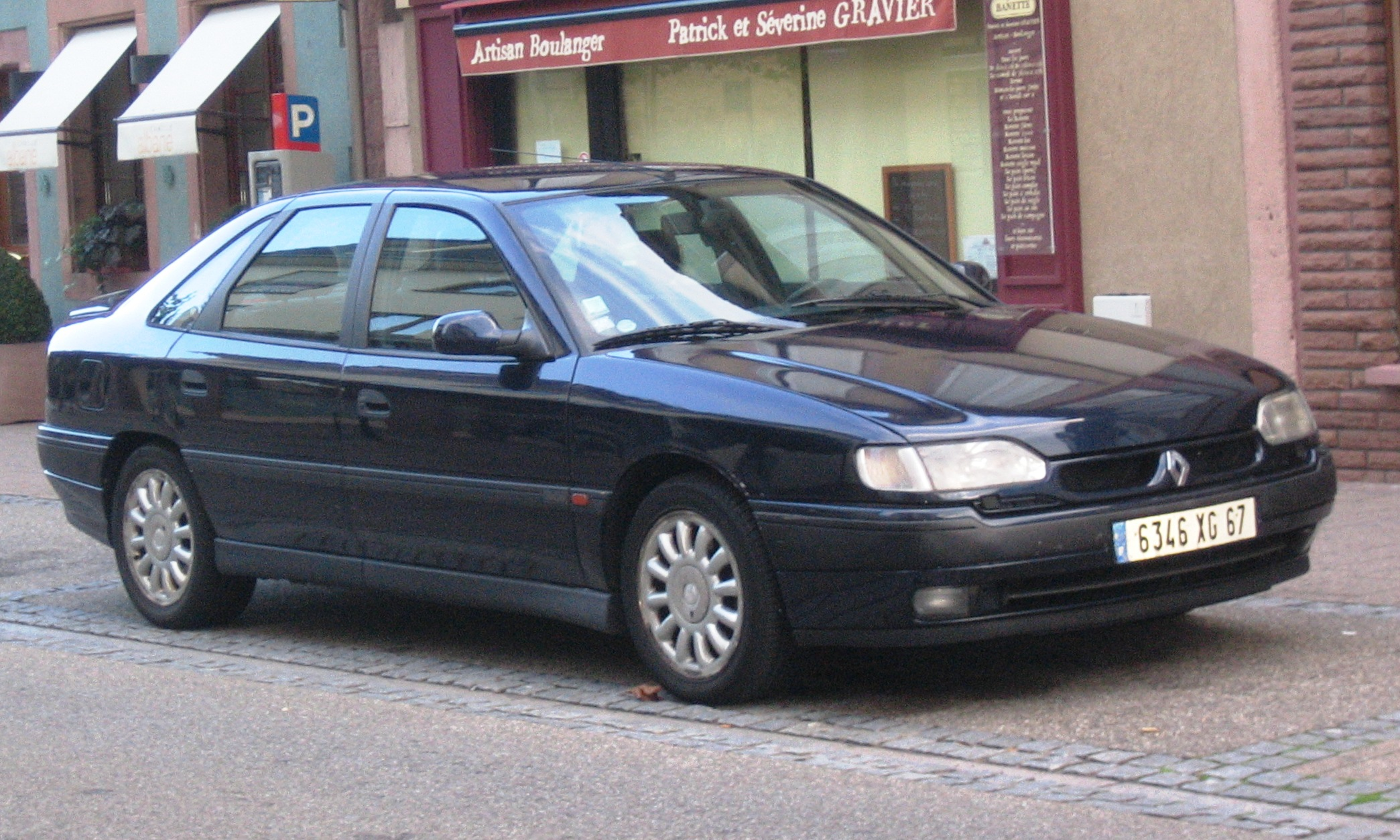

Overview
- Manufacturer: Renault
- Production: 1992–2000
- Assembly: France: Sandouville (Sandouville Renault Factory)

Body and chassis
- Class: Executive car (E)
- Body style: 5-door hatchback/notchback
- Layout: Transverse front engine, front-wheel drive / four-wheel drive

Powertrain
- Engine: Petrol: 1.9 L Volvo N7Q DOHC 16v I4; 2.0 L Renault/PSA J7R SOHC 8v I4; 2.0 L Renault/PSA J7R SOHC 12v I4; 2.2 L Renault/PSA J7T SOHC 8v I4; 2.2 L Renault/PSA J7T SOHC 12v I4; 2.5 L Volvo N7U DOHC 20v I5; 2.9 L PSA L7X DOHC 24v V6; 3.0 L Z7X SOHC 12v V6; 3.0 L Z7X-726 SOHC BiTurbo 12v V6; Diesel: 2.1 L J8S SOHC 8v dT I4; 2.2 L G8T SOHC 12v dT I4; 2.5 L Sofim S8U OHV 8v dT I4

Dimensions
- Wheelbase: 2,765 mm (108.86 in)
- Length: 4,768 mm (187.72 in)
- Width: 1,816 mm (71.50 in)
- Height: 1,435 mm (56.50 in)

Chronology
- Predecessor: Renault 25
- Successor: Renault Vel Satis

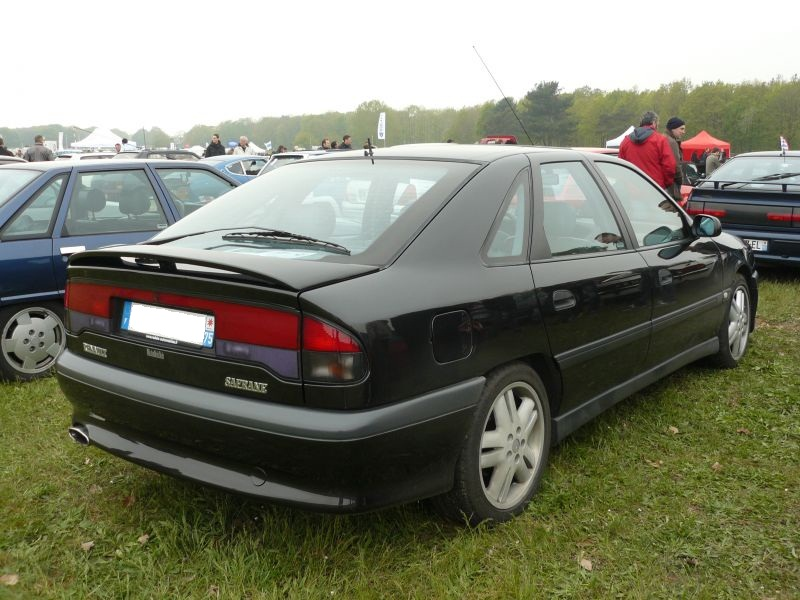
Rear end of original Safrane

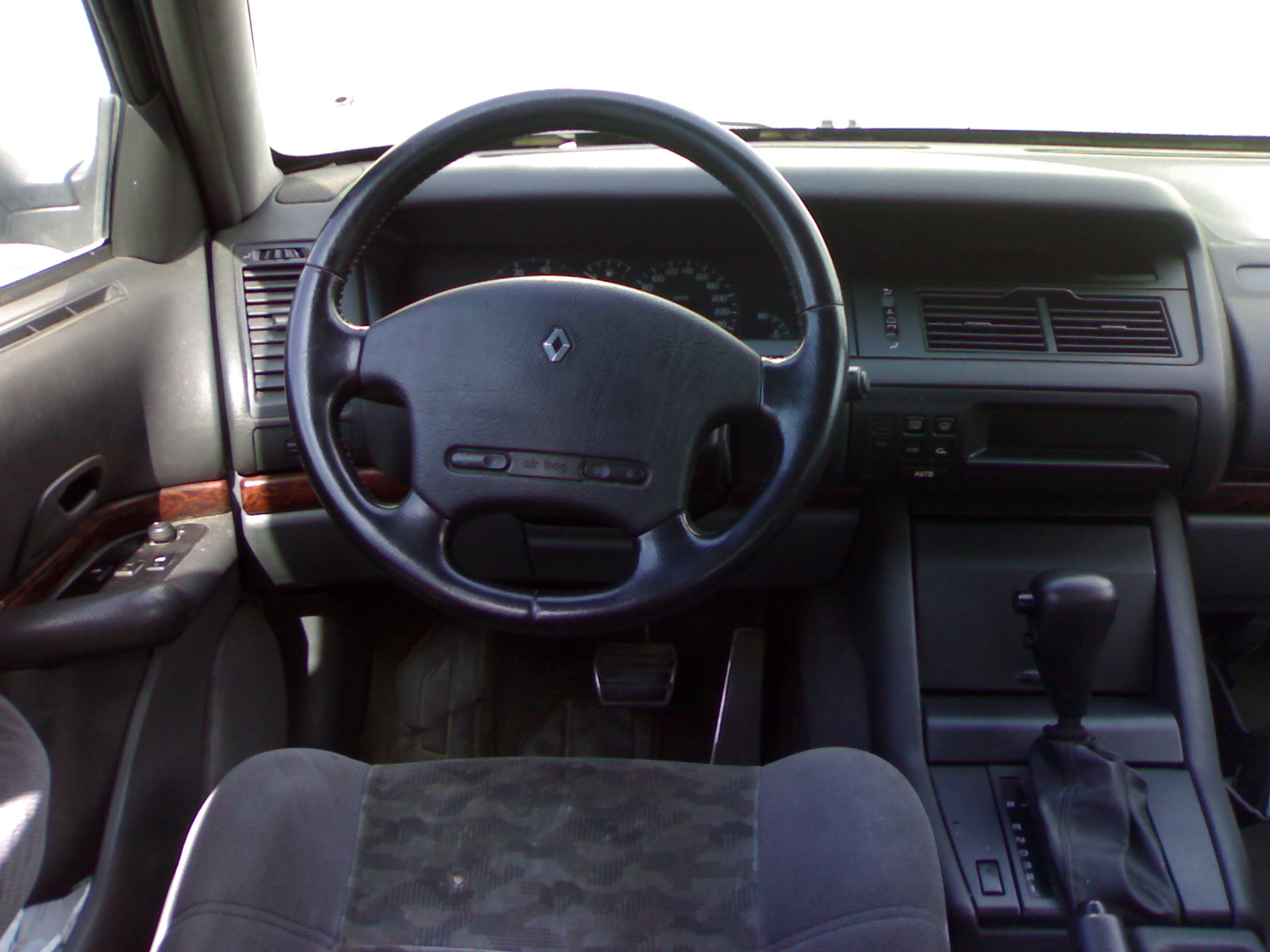
Interior

The Renault Safrane is an executive car (E-segment in Europe) designed and built by the French manufacturer Renault from 1992 until 2000. Throughout its production it remained the most expensive and most luxurious Renault available, although its commercial success was limited, compared to some similar models and also compared to its predecessor. Just over 300,000 Safranes were built, compared to nearly 800,000 Renault 25. It was replaced by the Vel Satis, and to some extent, by the short-lived two-door Avantime.

Between 2008 and 2019, a new model, based directly on the Renault Samsung SM5 sedan, was also called Renault Safrane.

== Background ==
The Safrane was launched in April 1992, to replace the Renault 25 in the full-size market segment. Its clean, aerodynamic styling was quite conservative and typical of early 1990s car design, also quite reminiscent of the 25's appearance.

The Safrane carried over the Renault 25's five-door hatchback/notchback design in spite of the traditional preference for saloon bodies in the executive car segment. The engines are mounted transversely and drive through the front wheels, with four-wheel drive also available on some versions. The Safrane was built with a range of petrol or diesel engines and manual or automatic transmissions. All petrol engines were fuel injected and were fitted with three way catalytic converters, as required in Europe after 1993 for engines of all sizes.

The Safrane was also the first Renault to be equipped with airbags.

== History ==
The Safrane's design was a deliberate effort to overcome the R25's main weaknesses — insufficient chassis stiffness and poor build quality. Renault was also keen to take noise reduction to best-in-class levels. These constraints resulted in a much heavier car than its predecessor (+200–300 kg / 440-660 lb.) due to a heavily reinforced chassis and the liberal use of soundproofing materials.

At launch in 1992, the Safrane offered six engines including one diesel (all gasoline motors have a catalytic converter):

Gasoline:

- 2.0 L (1995 cc), J7R-Q732/Q733, injection, 8v I4, 107 PS (79 kW; 106 hp) (in markets where engine size was a factor in yearly registration costs)
- 2.2 L (2165 cc), J7T-R760/S761, injection, 8v Douvrin I4, 107 PS (79 kW; 106 hp) (in other markets)
- 2.0 L (1995 cc), J7R, injection, 12v I4, 133 PS (98 kW; 131 hp) (in markets where engines above 2.0 L are heavily taxed)
- 2.2 L (2165 cc), J7T, injection, 12v Douvrin I4, 137 PS (101 kW; 135 hp) (in other markets)
- 3.0 L (2963 cc), Z7X-B722/B723/P722/P726/C723/B753, injection, 12v PRV V6, 167 PS (123 kW; 165 hp)

Diesel:

- 2.1 L (2068 cc), J8S-T760, 8v turbodiesel I4, 88 PS (65 kW; 87 hp)
- 2.5 L (2499 cc), S8U-L762/M763, 8v Iveco Sofim S8U/8144.97 turbodiesel I4, 113 PS (83 kW; 111 hp)

The Safrane's launch was free of the build quality problems that ruined the Renault 25's reputation. Critics praised the car's comfortable and spacious interior, excellent noise insulation, and incisive handling.

However, the manual transmission's cable-actuated shifter (a first on a Renault) was a weak link, a significant problem in the European market where at the time more than 80% of cars sold were manuals. Sales outside France also remained limited.

In the end of 1993, a 115 PS 2.5 L turbodiesel was added to the range, increasing Safrane's attractiveness, yet it faced tough competition from the likes of Audi's 140 PS (103 kW; 138 hp) direct injection diesel of the same size, introduced a few months later in the Audi 100.

== Safrane Biturbo ==
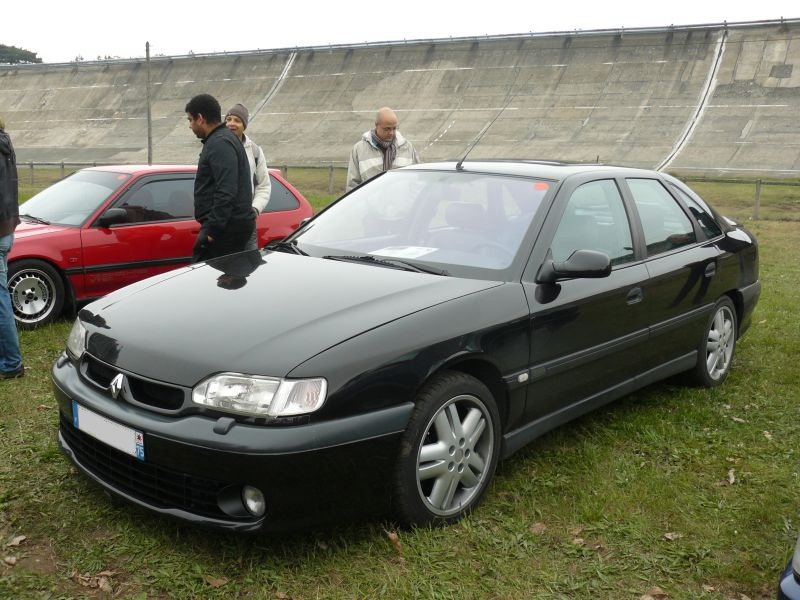
Safrane Biturbo Baccara

In 1994, Renault launched the high-performance Biturbo version available in RXE and Baccara models. This model featured a twin-turbo, 262 PS (193 kW; 258 hp) evolution of the 3.0 L V6 of the Alpine A610, developed with the assistance of German tuning firms Hartge and Irmscher, coupled with all-wheel drive.

However, it was only available with a manual transmission, as no automatic gearbox existed for a transversely mounted engine of that horsepower with AWD.

Automatic transmissions and V8 engines are strongly preferred in the price class where Biturbo competed, therefore, only 806 Biturbos were made. Production ended in September 1996. In the same year, the French coachbuilder Heuliez presented the Safrane Long Cours, which was like a station wagon version of the Safrane Biturbo in luxury Baccara trim.

== Facelift ==
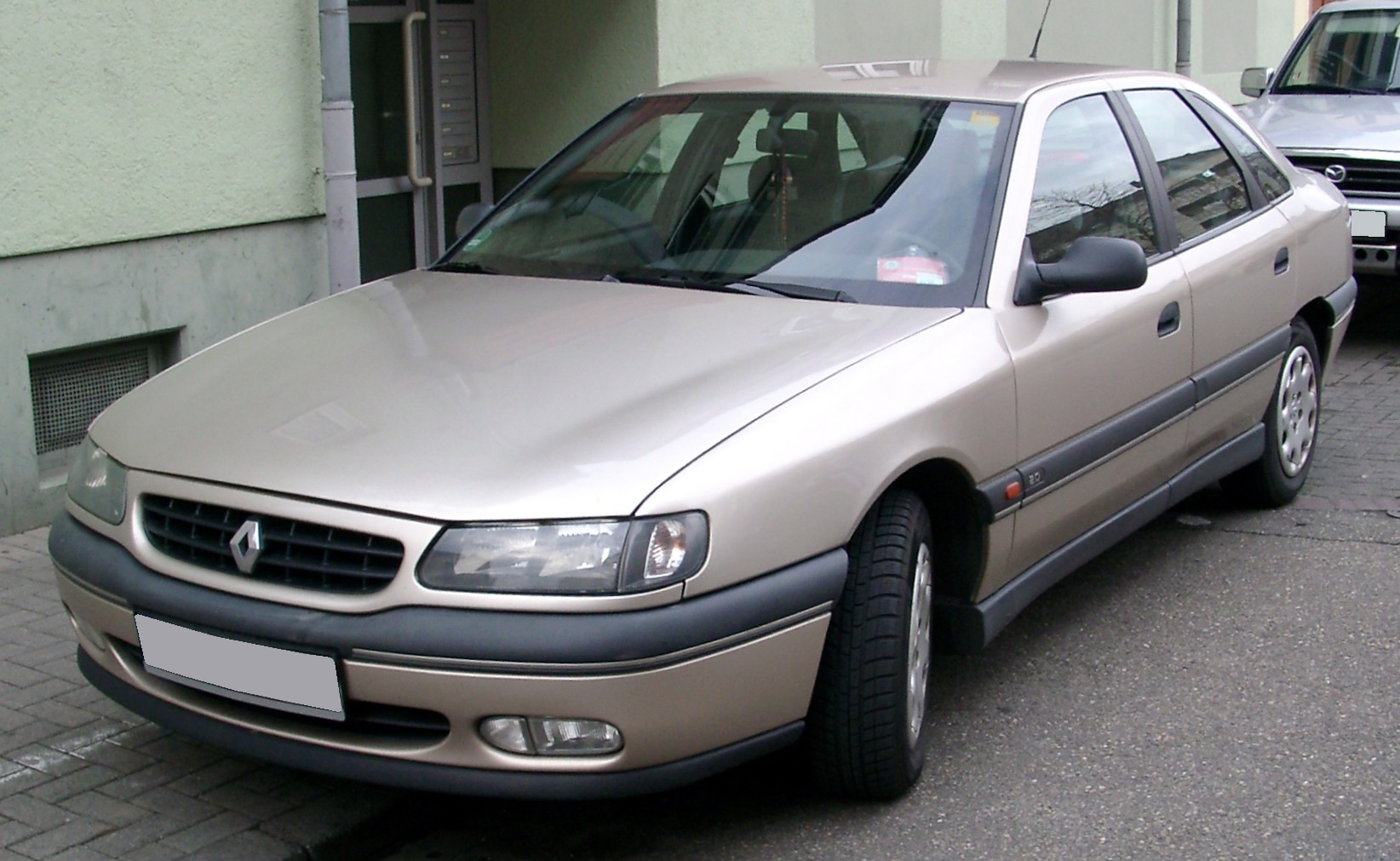
The Phase 2 Renault Safrane

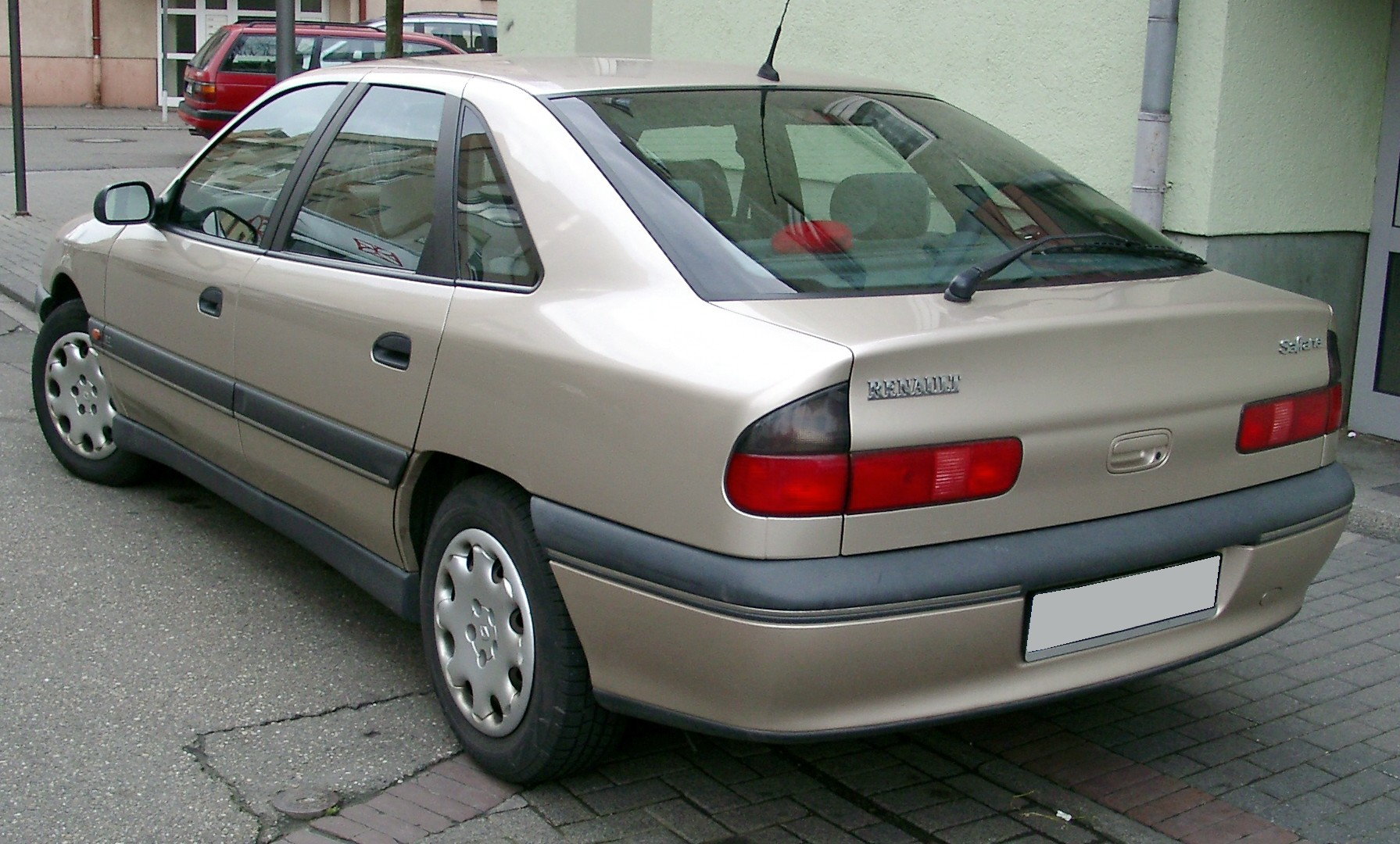
The Phase 2 Renault Safrane

The Safrane received a major upgrade in July 1996 to revive sales. The front and rear ends of the car were restyled in a much more modern fashion and the equipment levels were upgraded. The concept that every trim level featured a slightly different front end was retained.

A redesign of the manual transmission's cable actuator solved the shift quality issue, while a new Aisin Warner automatic transmission replaced the somewhat unreliable Renault unit.

The engine lineup was completely renewed:

Gasoline:

- 2.0 L (1948 cc), N7Q, 16v Volvo B4204S I4, 136 PS (100 kW; 134 hp)
- 2.5 L (2435 cc), N7U, 20v Volvo B5254FS I5, 168 PS (124 kW; 166 hp)
- 3.0 L (2946 cc), L7X, 24v ESL V6, 190 PS (140 kW; 187 hp)

Diesel:

- 2.2 L (2188 cc), G8T, 12v I4 Turbodiesel, 113 PS (83 kW; 111 hp)

The four- and five-cylinder petrol engines were Volvo designs and their inclusion in the Safrane lineup was a result of Renault's short-lived alliance with the Swedish carmaker during the beginning of the 1990s (the B41 was also fitted in the Laguna). The V6 was an all-new design by PSA and Renault. The turbodiesel was an all-new in-house design.

While the Volvo engine designs would externally appear to be unchanged, there are some subtle differences. The engine mounts are one example along with the oil filter mounting, power steering pump, ECU, and timing belt cover. The AisinWarner gearbox appears to be unaffected though there may be a difference between driveshafts and possibly the mount. The camshaft pulleys were unique for Renault making the Volvo timing marks redundant. Despite these differences, many of the different parts were still manufactured and stamped by Volvo even though they were fitted exclusively to the Renault Safrane and are unavailable via Volvo parts. The engine requires a specialist alignment tool to set up the timing, however, this tool can also be used on the same Volvo engines. The 2.5 engine is technically a 2.4, being 2435 cc, but was rounded upwards by Renault. Volvo badges the 2435 cc engine both as a 2.4 and a 2.5.

The Safrane 2.5 engine is not a B5244S, but a Volvo B5254FS engine. The Safrane has a compression ratio of 10.5:1 instead of the 10.3:1 of the B5244S. Although the head gaskets are very similar, the B5244S gasket has a coolant passage hole missing which features on the head gasket for the 2.5 Safrane and the B5254FS.

The modernization did not increase sales and the model was discontinued in December 2000, having sold at a rate of less than 40% of the numbers achieved by the Renault 25 it had replaced. Just over 300,000 Safranes were built in its eight-year production span.

For April 2002, it was replaced by the much more radically styled Vel Satis, accompanied by the Avantime. The Vel Satis did not see sales increase, while the Avantime's design suffered in the marketplace and the model was quickly discontinued.

== Trim levels ==
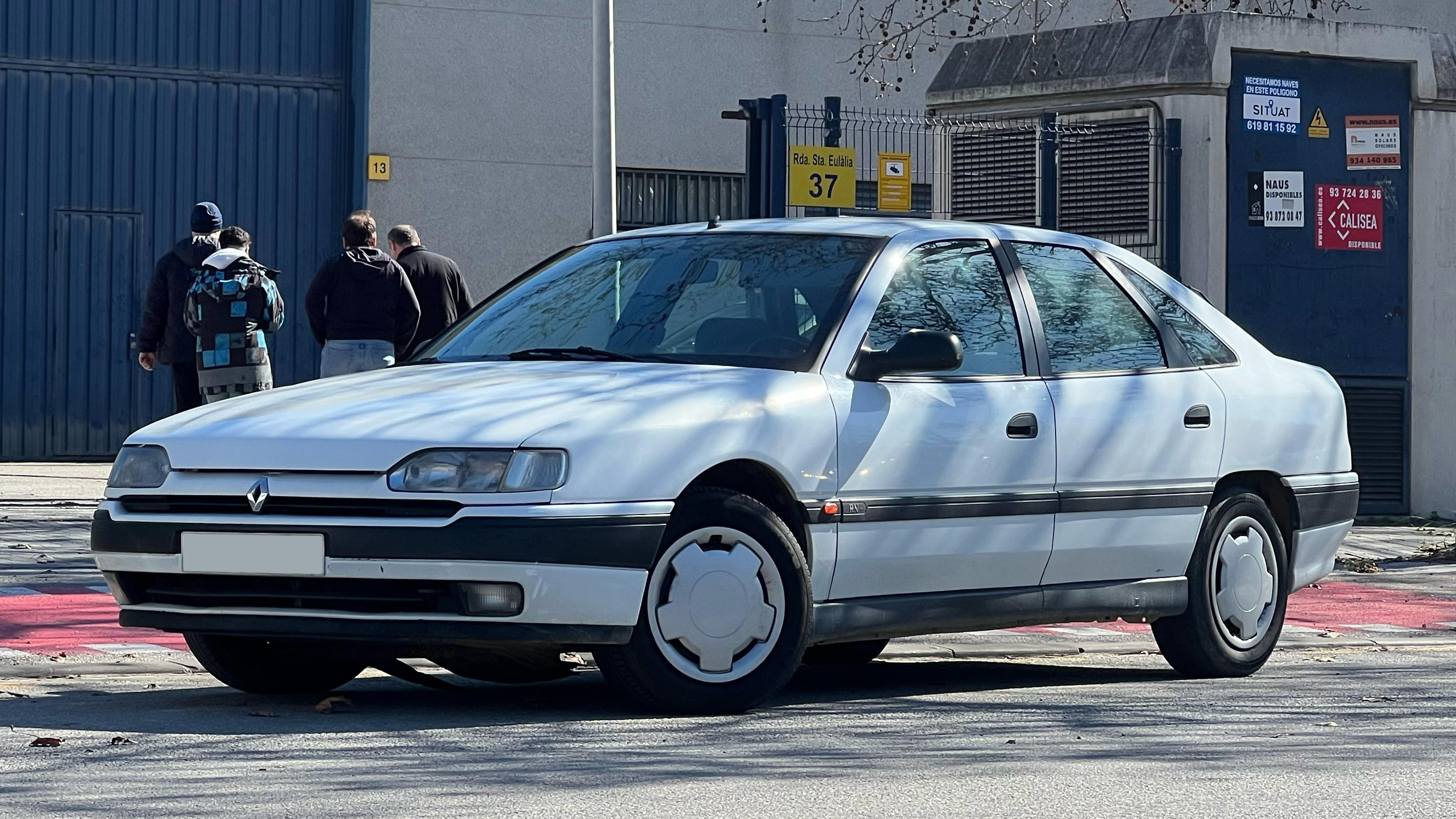
Renault Safrane RN

=== RN ===
Lowest trim level. Available Engines: 2.1 dT, 2.5dT, 2.0i, 2.2Si. Externally: the mirrors are painted body colour and the vehicle has a simple hubcap design. ABS was optional for the RN, standard on all other equipment levels.

Inside: front electric windows, electric mirrors (a few models had manual mirrors). This trim level offers remote central locking (infrared). The upholstery fabric is less sumptuous on the front armrest. No air conditioning; dual zone heating.

=== RT ===
Intermediate trim level. Available Engines: 2.1 dT 2.5dT, 2.0i, V6. Externally: the black painted mirrors; "honeycomb" style "Élysée" wheels emerge.

Inside: In addition to power windows and mirrors, an alarm is fitted, including volumetric roof-mounted sensors; there is a lockable glove box, a velour trimmed front armrest, (optional) dual-zone automatic air conditioning; rear headphone jacks with rear speakers isolator switch; synthesised voice control. The Safrane RT is trimmed in "Trocadero" velour.

=== RXE ===
The premium level of finish. Available Engines: 2.5dT Safrane RXE and V6.

At this stage, included were: power steering, electric mirrors, power windows, rear headphone jacks, heated front seats with electrically adjustable squab and backrest, and inflatable lumbar adjustment with three memory positions. Optional leather was widely chosen by customers. Self dipping nearside mirror whilst reversing; dual-zone air conditioning; rear leather electric seats (available until 1995) pneumatic suspension, Philips stereo; voice synthesiser; "Image" wheels; twin screen digital display including fuel consumption and remaining range.

	RN	RT	RXE
alloy wheels	O	X	X
fog lamps	O	O	?
electric and heated mirrors	O	X	X
driver airbag	O	O	?
ABS	O	X	X
Radio k7 6000	O	O	X
speech synthesis	X	X	X
onboard computer	X	X	X
leather	O	O	O
rear electric windows	X	O	X
two reading lights for rear seats	X	X	X
puddle lights	X	X	X
electric glass sunroof	O	O	?
climate control	O	O	X
Heated seats	X	O	X
power seats	X	O	X
Rear head restraints	O	X	X
AT on 2.5 dT	–	O	?
AT on 2.0i	O	–	–
AT on 2.2	–	O	–

=== Questor ===
Along with the Phase 2 Safrane, Renault also offered a Safrane variant called the Questor, which also relied on the Volvo powerplants mentioned above. The Questor differs only by having factory-fitted satellite navigation, which is a Philips Carin 520 with infrared remote control. This model was also fitted, at least in the United Kingdom market, with all the options available on the car as standard except the heated windscreen which was still an option.

== Production ==
Calendar year	Production
1991	289
1992	48,224
1993	65,926
1994	45,354
1995	35,687
1996	29,543
1997	30,954
1998	22,854
1999	21,891
2000	12,367
Total	313,089

Note: 1991 units are pre-series vehicles.

== 2008 (A34R) ==
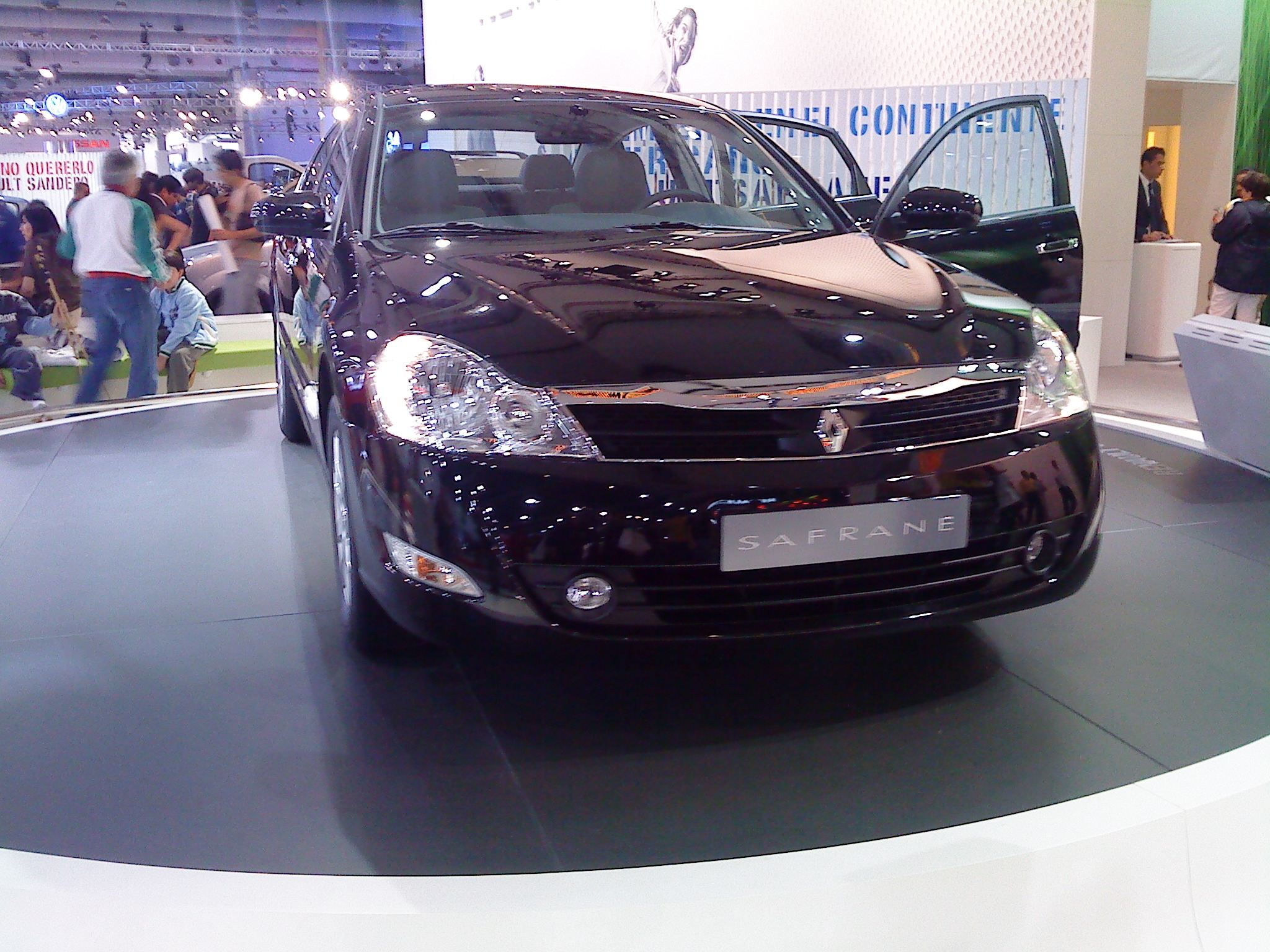
Samsung SM5 based Renault Safrane (2008–2010)

In August 2008, Renault revived the Safrane name for several markets in the Gulf States. Based directly on the second generation (DF) of Renault Samsung SM5 sedan, the car was manufactured by Renault Samsung in South Korea, and also presented in Mexico in February 2009.

Renault sold the Renault Latitude in Europe, although not in the United Kingdom (due to the decline of the traditional saloon market). This is a lengthened and widened version of the Laguna, platform with vastly similar engines. In Mexico and the states of the Persian Gulf, the Latitude was sold as the Safrane.
