= Renault Samsung SM5 =

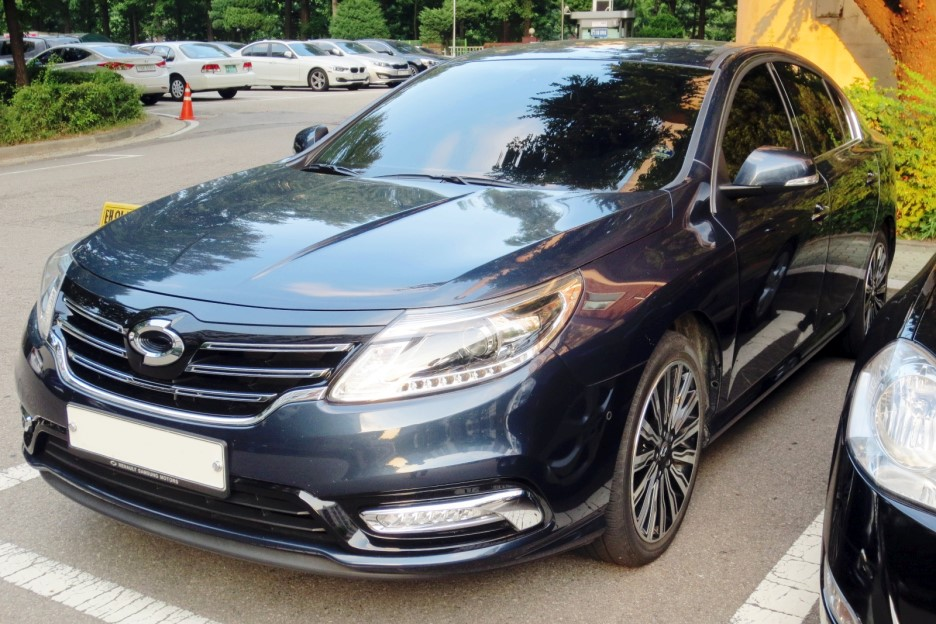

Overview
- Manufacturer: Renault Samsung Motors
- Production: 1998–2019
- Assembly: South Korea: Busan

Body and chassis
- Class: Mid-size car (D)
- Body style: 4-door saloon
- Layout: Front-engine, front-wheel-drive

The Renault Samsung SM5 is a mid-size car or large family car (D-segment in Europe) produced by the South Korean manufacturer Renault Samsung Motors, with technical assistance from Japanese automaker Nissan. Between 1998 and 2012, Renault Samsung Motors had produced 680,000 SM5 models. In 2019, 10,002 models were made at the Busan plant.

The first generation was launched in 1998, with the second generation introduced in 2005 and the current third generation SM5 launched in 2009. In some markets, the SM5 is sold as the Renault Latitude or Renault Safrane.

== First generation (KPQ/A32; 1998–2005) ==
First generation (KPQ)
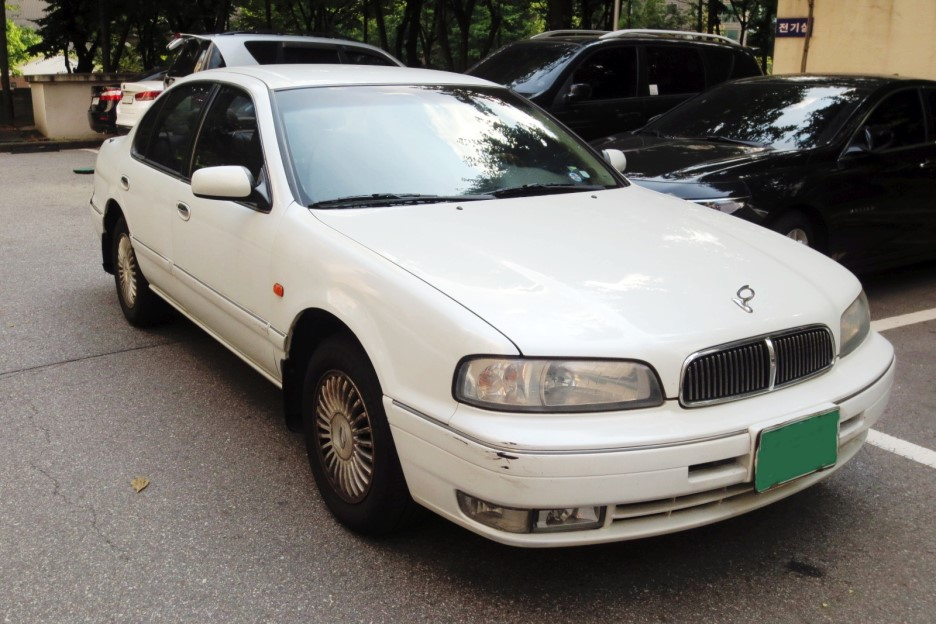

Overview
- Also called: Samsung SQ 5 (Chile); Samsung SQ 5V (Kazakhstan)
- Production: 1998–2005

Body and chassis
- Related: Nissan Maxima (A32); Nissan Cefiro A32

Powertrain
- Engine: 2.0L Nissan SR20DE I4; 2.0L Nissan VQ20DE V6; 2.5L Nissan VQ25DE V6; 3.0L Nissan VQ30DE V6
- Transmission: 4-speed automatic; 5-speed manual

Dimensions
- Wheelbase: 2,700 mm (106.3 in)
- Length: 1998–2003: 4,825 mm (190.0 in); 2003–2005: 4,835 mm (190.4 in); V6 model: 4,845 mm (190.7 in)
- Width: 1,775 mm (69.9 in); V6 model: 1,785 mm (70.3 in)
- Height: 1,415 mm (55.7 in); V6 model: 1,425 mm (56.1 in)

The first generation model was based on the Nissan Maxima (A32). There were three trim levels at the time of launch: SM520, SM520V, and SM525V. The models with the V monikor signifies the V6 powertrain, and shares the same exterior appearances. The regular SM5, the SM520 is powered by an inline-4 2.0 liter SR20. The SM520V is powered by a V6 2.0 liter, and the SM525V by a 2.5 liter VQ engine. A base trim called the SM518 with an inline-4 1.8 liter SR18 engine was added afterwards. The transmission is equipped with a five-speed manual transmission for four-cylinder engines, and the V6 model has automatic 4-speed transmissions.

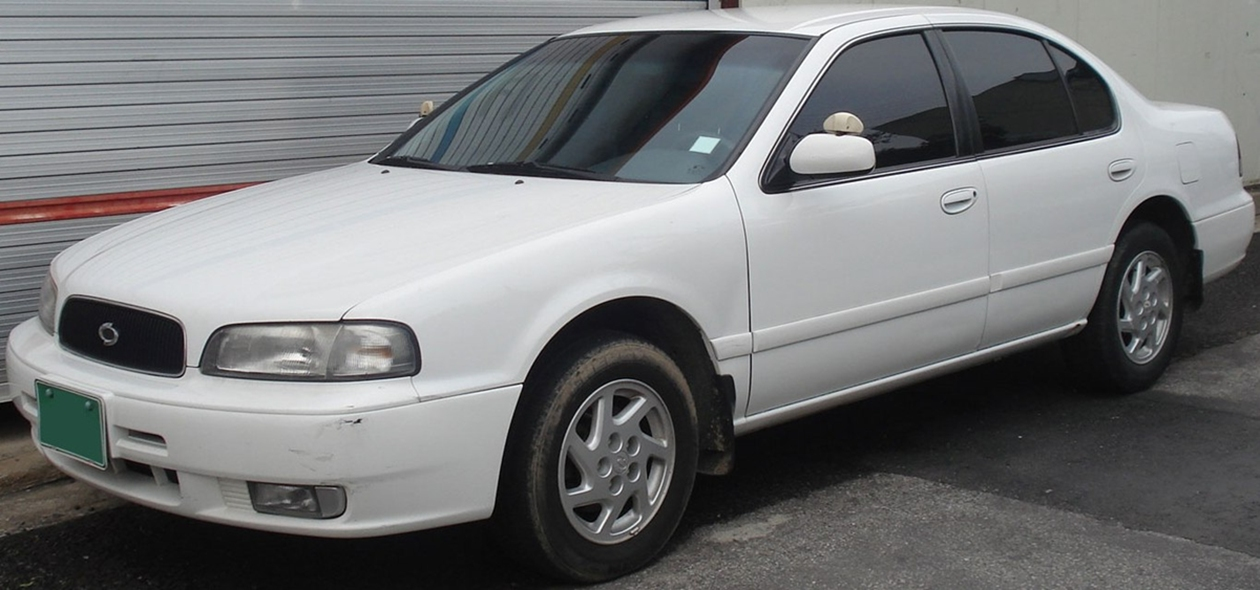
Samsung SM5

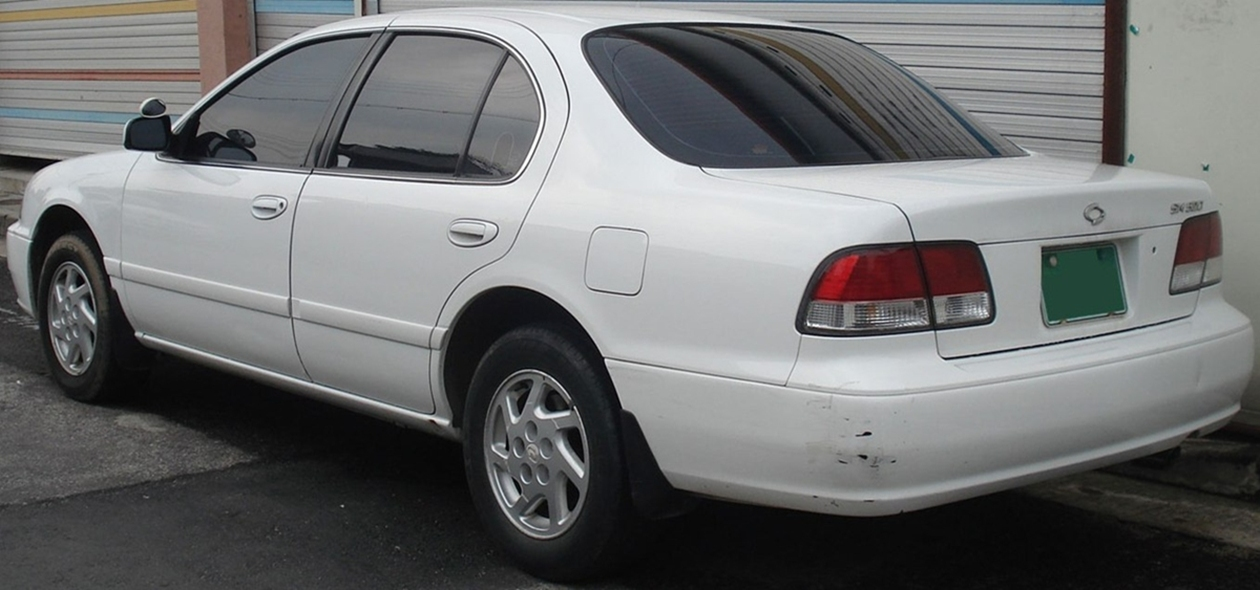
Rear

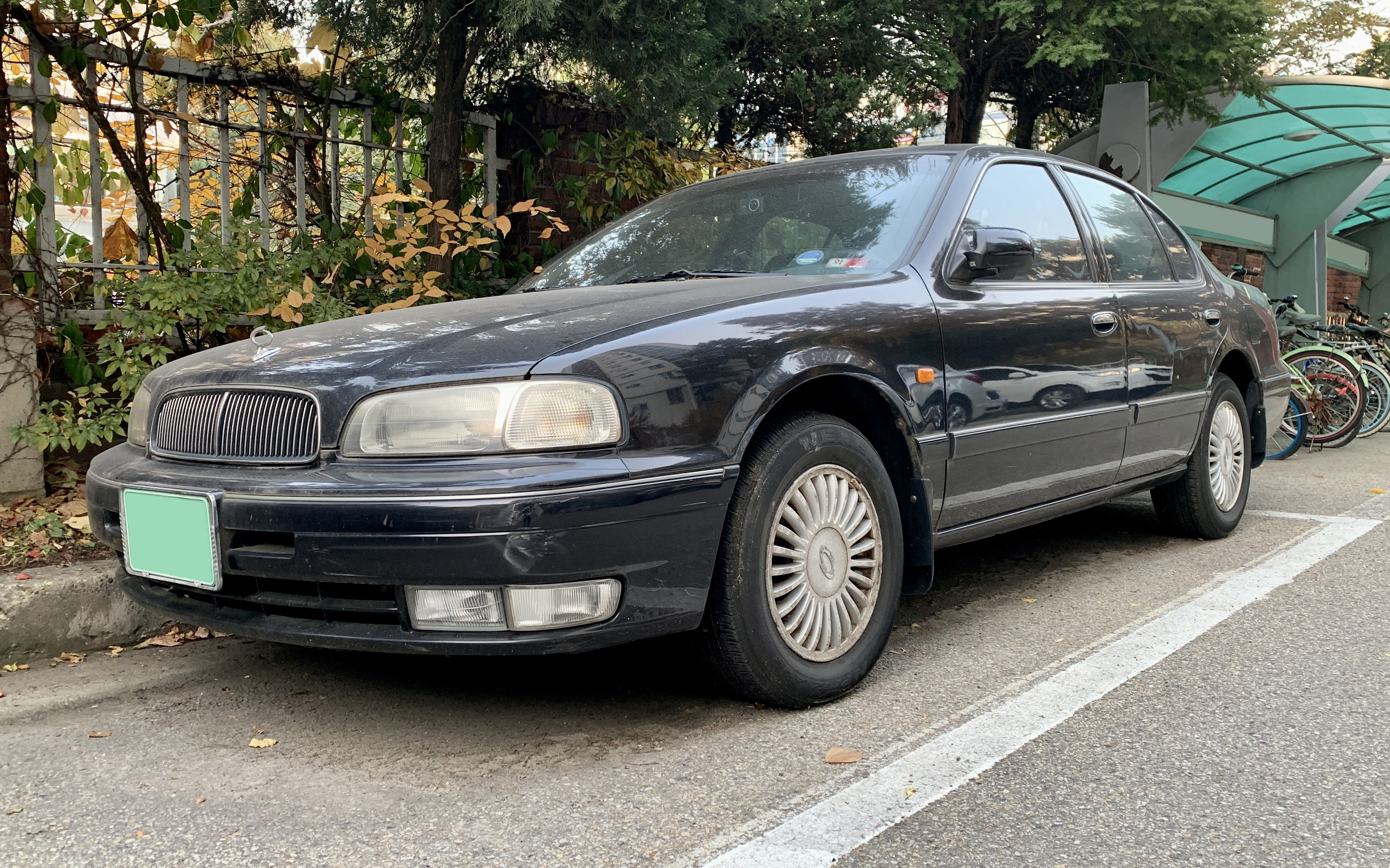
Samsung SM5 525V

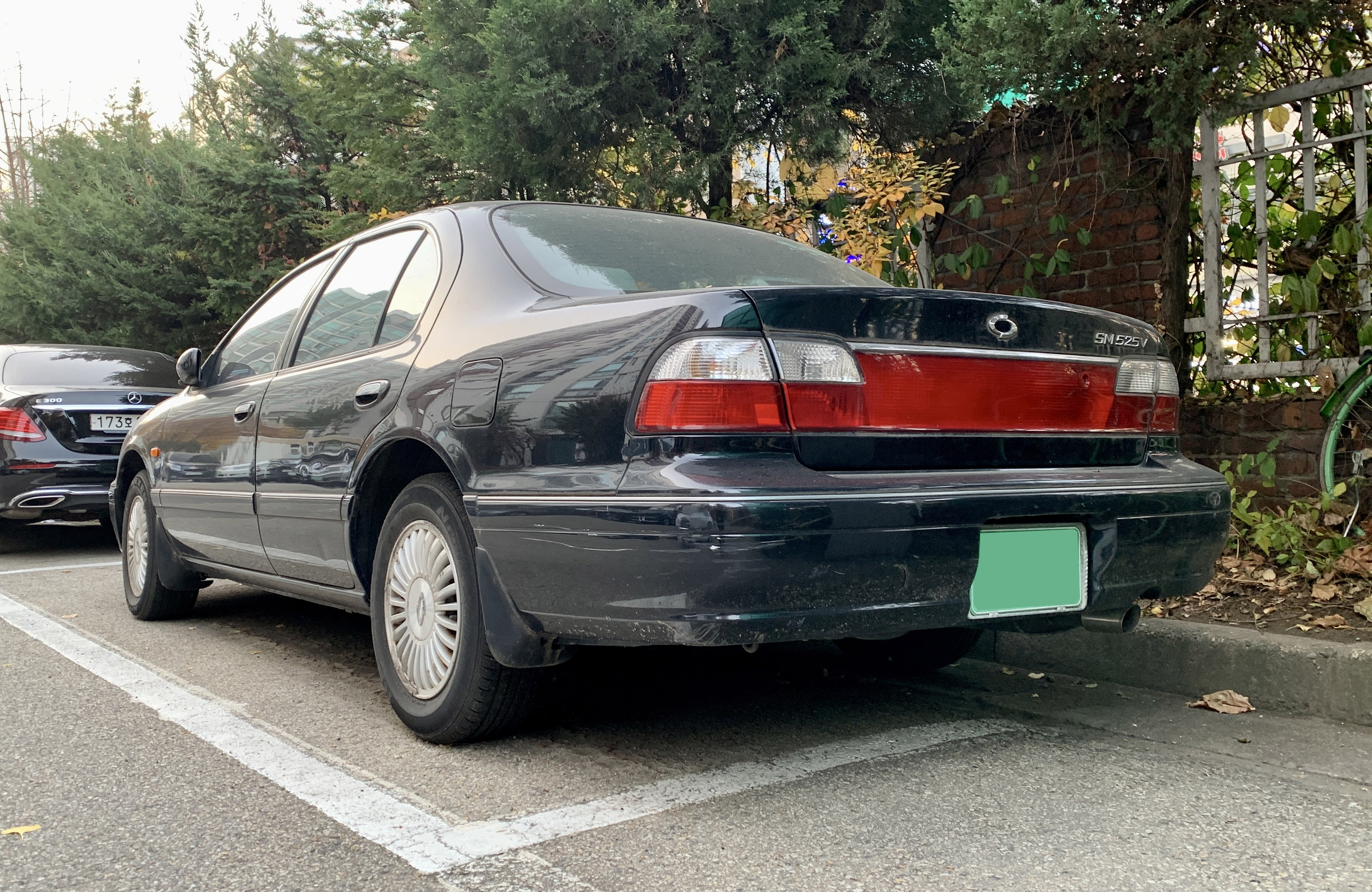
Rear

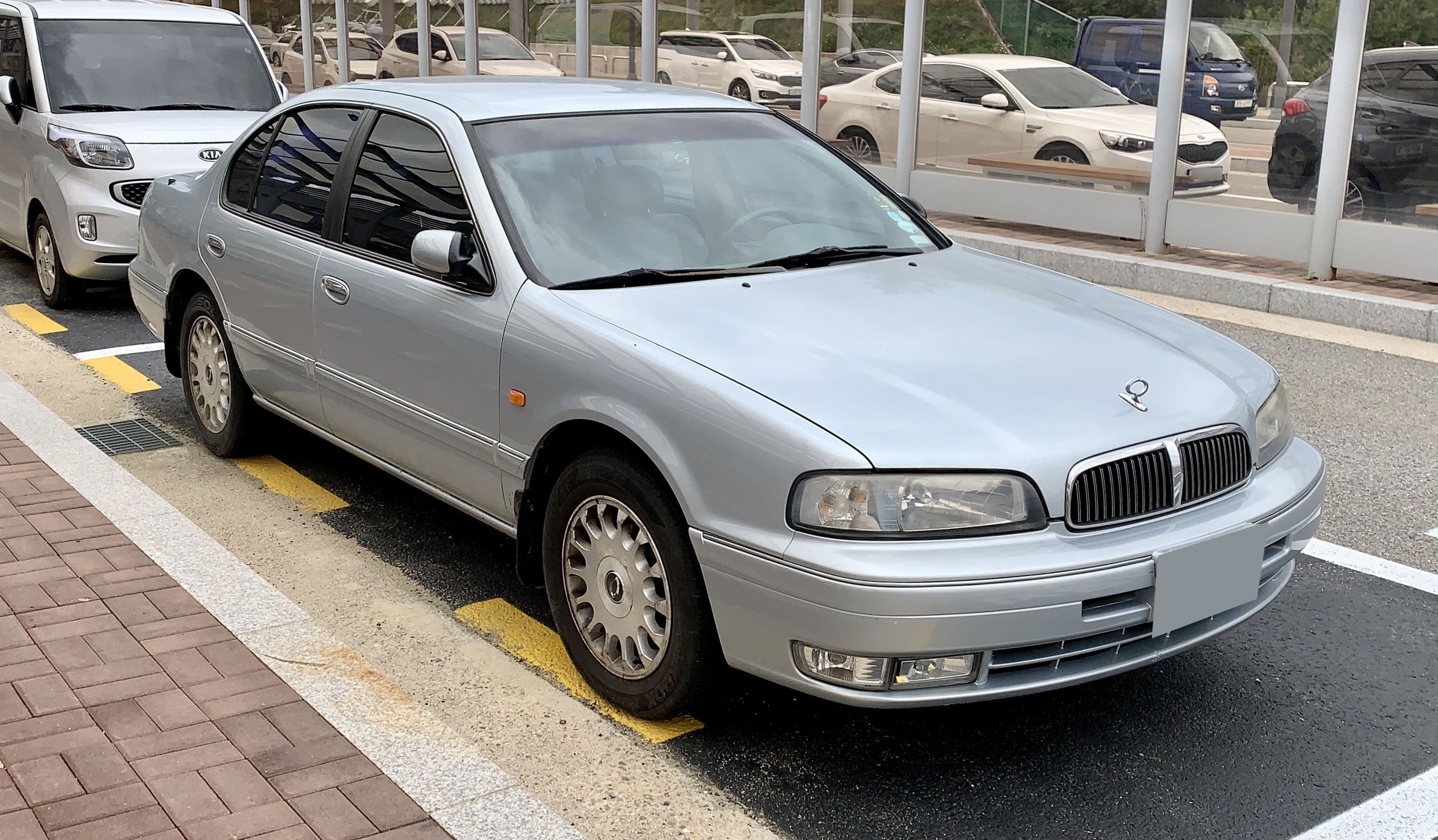
Samsung SM5 525V 2002 minor change

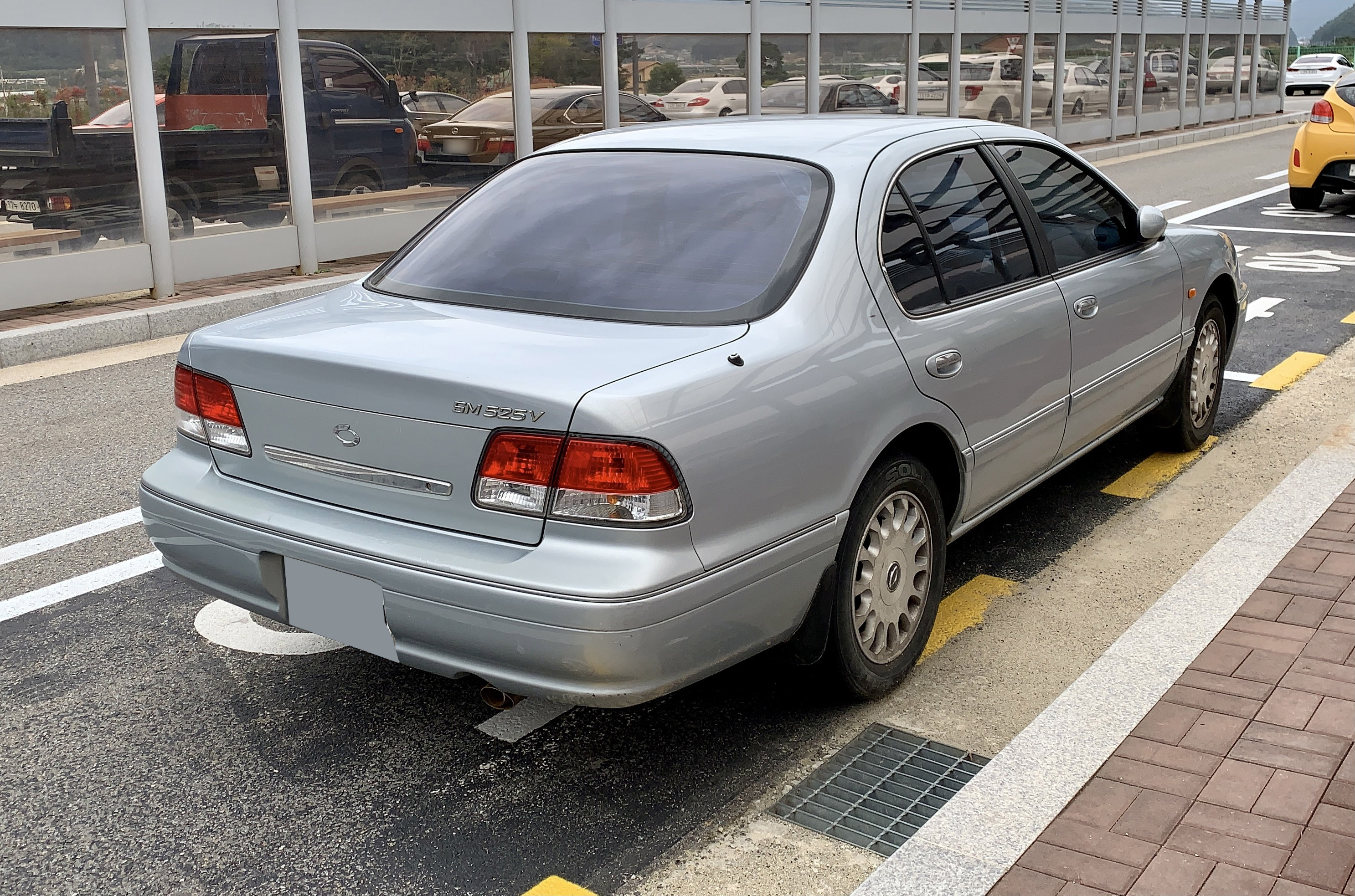
Rear

On September 1, 2003, the facelift of the first generation Samsung SM5 was released.

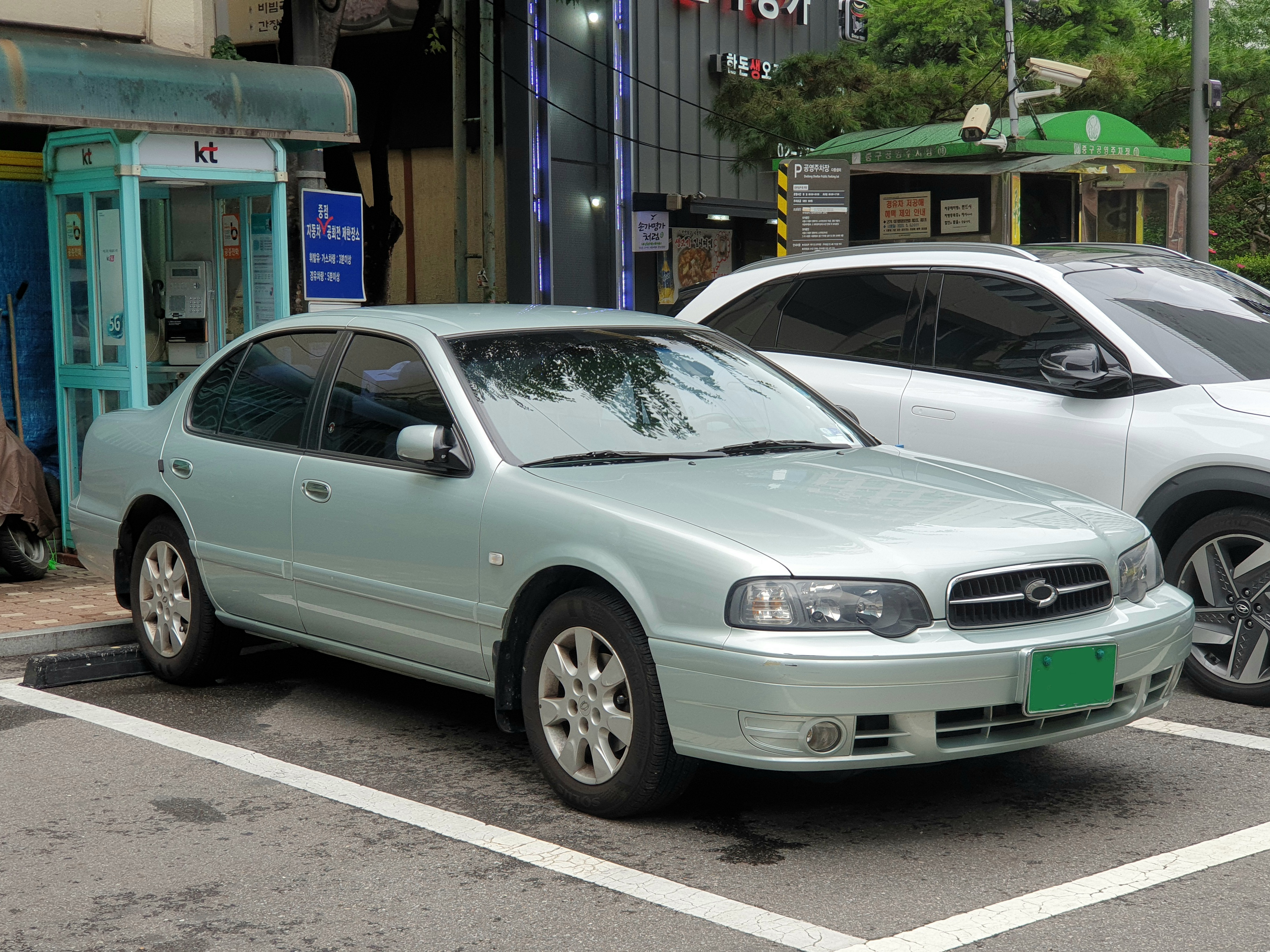
Samsung SM5 facelift (SM520)

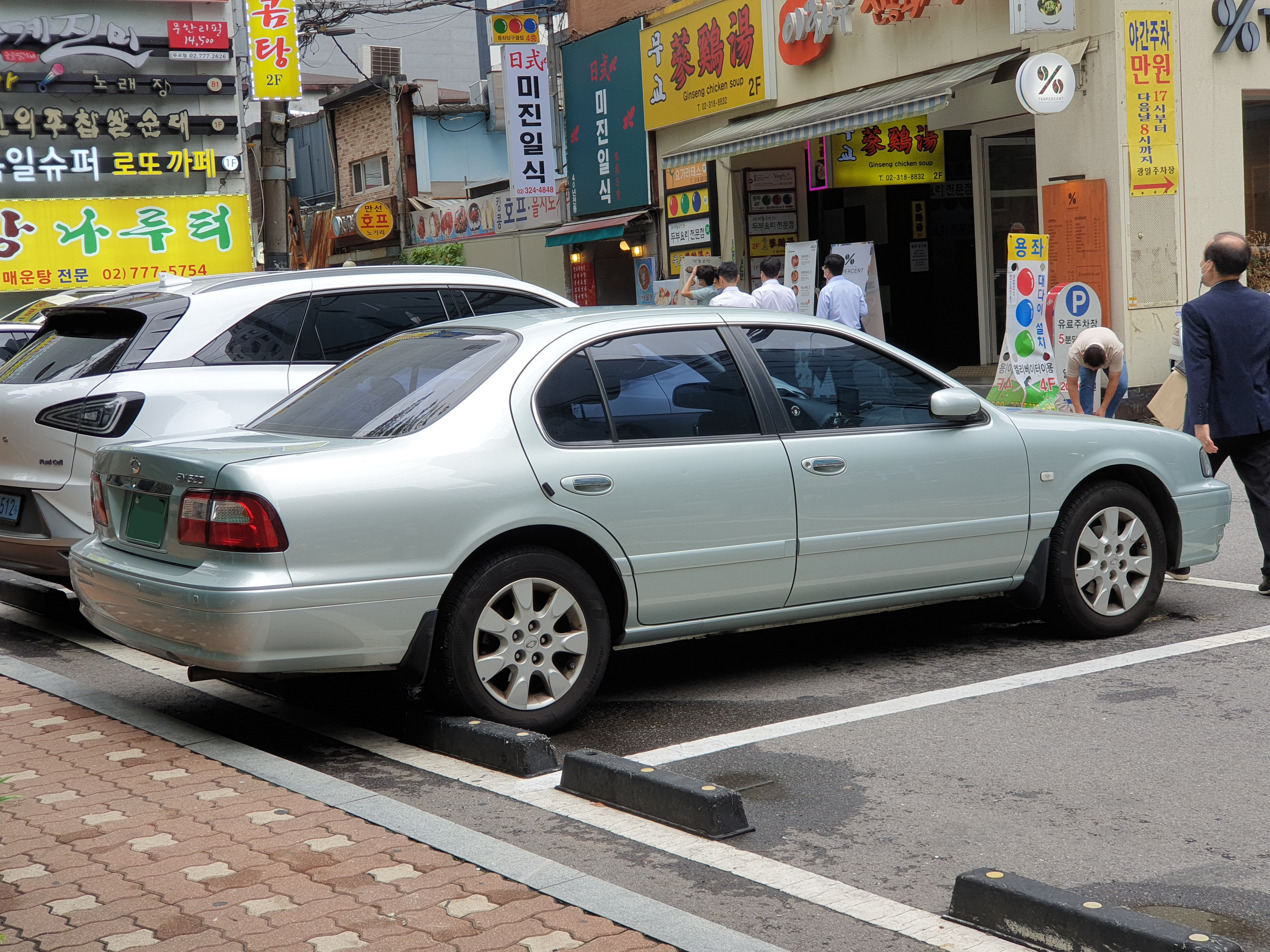
Rear (SM520)

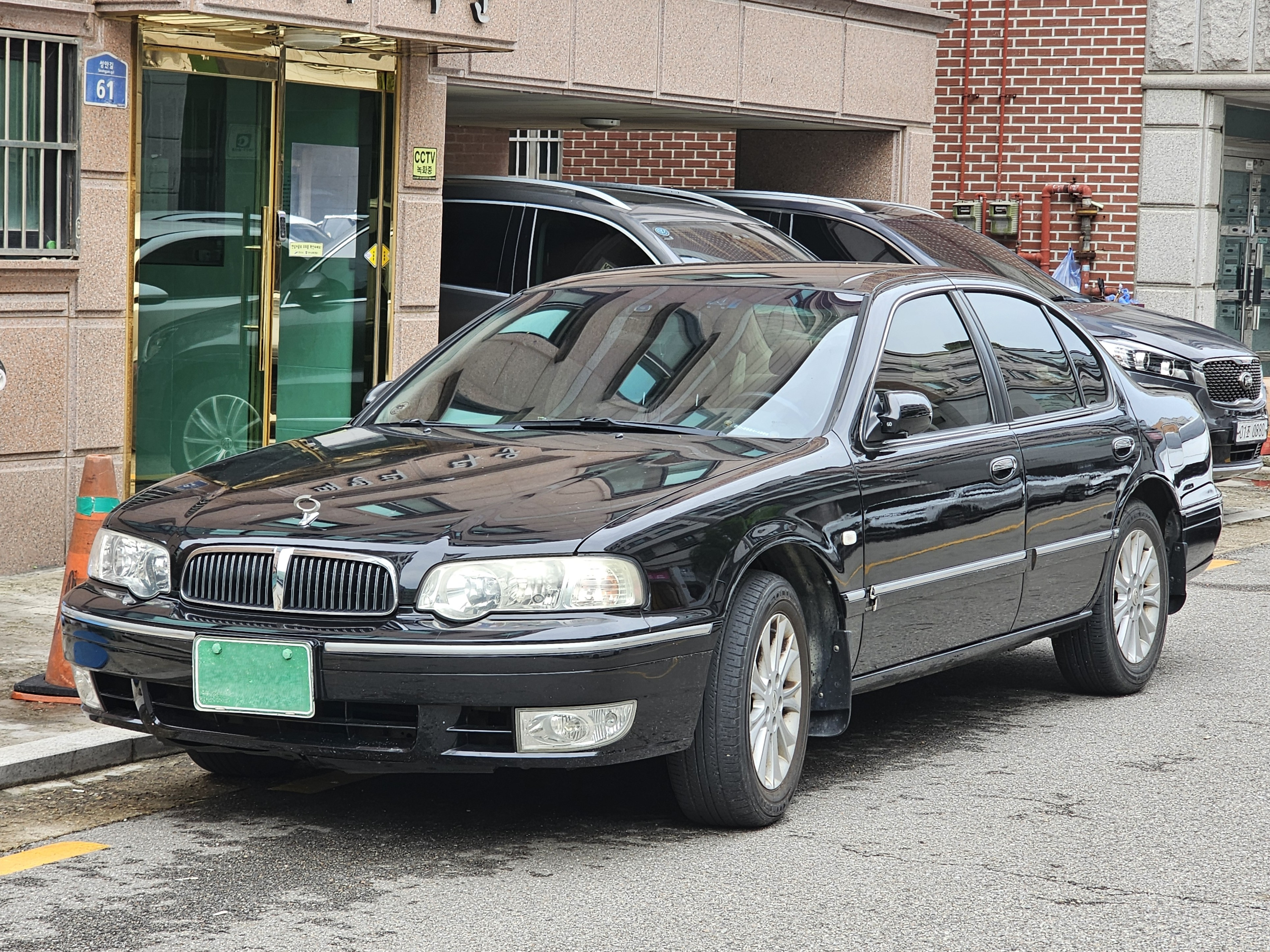
Samsung SM5 525V facelift

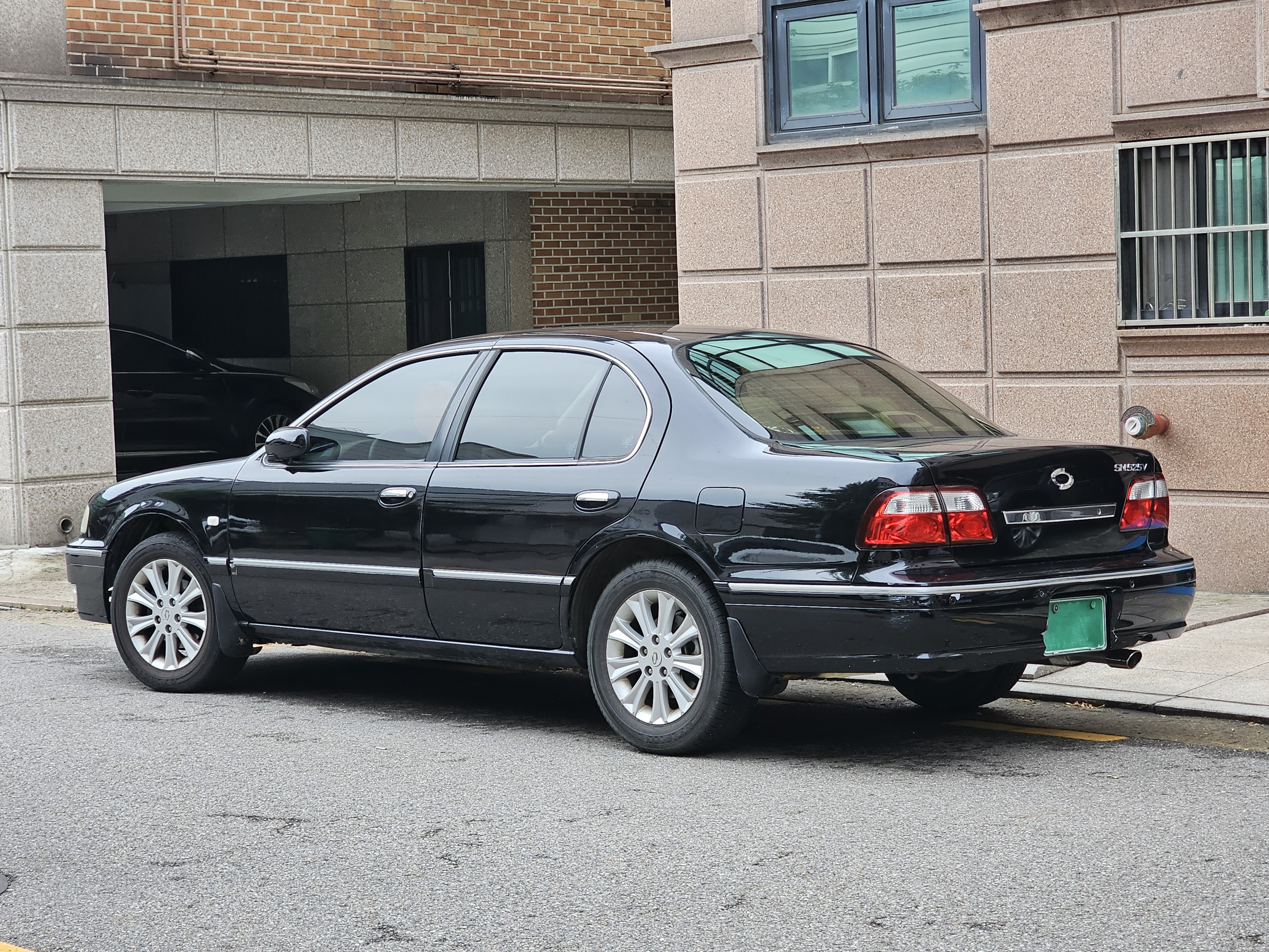
Rear

== Second generation (EX1/DF(A34R); 2005–2010) ==
Second generation (EX1/DF)
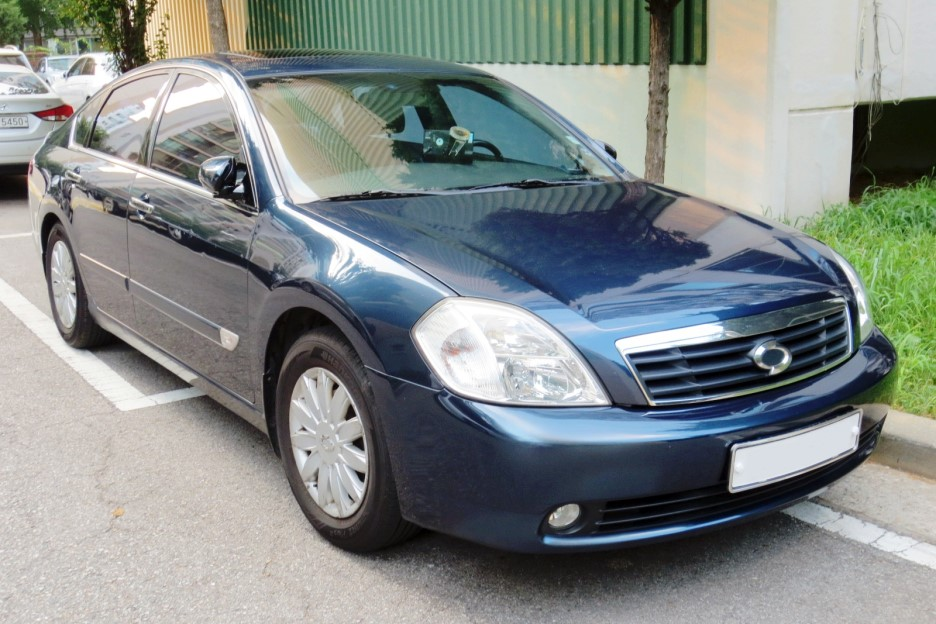

Overview
- Also called: Renault Safrane (Mexico and Middle East); Renault Samsung SM5 New Impression (Facelift); Nissan Teana (J31)
- Production: 2005–2010

Body and chassis
- Platform: Nissan FF-L platform
- Related: Nissan Maxima A34; Nissan Altima L31

Powertrain
- Engine: 2.0 L Nissan SR20DE I4 (EX1); 2.0 L Nissan MR20DE I4 (DF); 2.3 L Nissan VQ23DE V6 (Safrane)
- Transmission: 5-speed manual; 4-speed automatic; 5-speed automatic (Safrane)

Dimensions
- Wheelbase: 2,775 mm (109.3 in)
- Length: 2005–2007: 4,895 mm (192.7 in); 2007–2010: 4,905 mm (193.1 in)
- Width: 2005–2007: 1,785 mm (70.3 in); 2007–2010: 1,787 mm (70.4 in)
- Height: 1,475 mm (58.1 in)

The second generation model replaced the previous model in 2005. It is based on its sibling, the SM7. The model is also based on the Nissan Teana/Maxima.

In 2008–2010, the car was also sold in the Gulf States and Mexico, as the Renault Safrane. The project code for the SM5 Impression is DF, while that of the Renault Safrane is A34R.

On July 1, 2003, Renault Samsung celebrated the production of the 300,000th SM5 to be manufactured in South Korea.

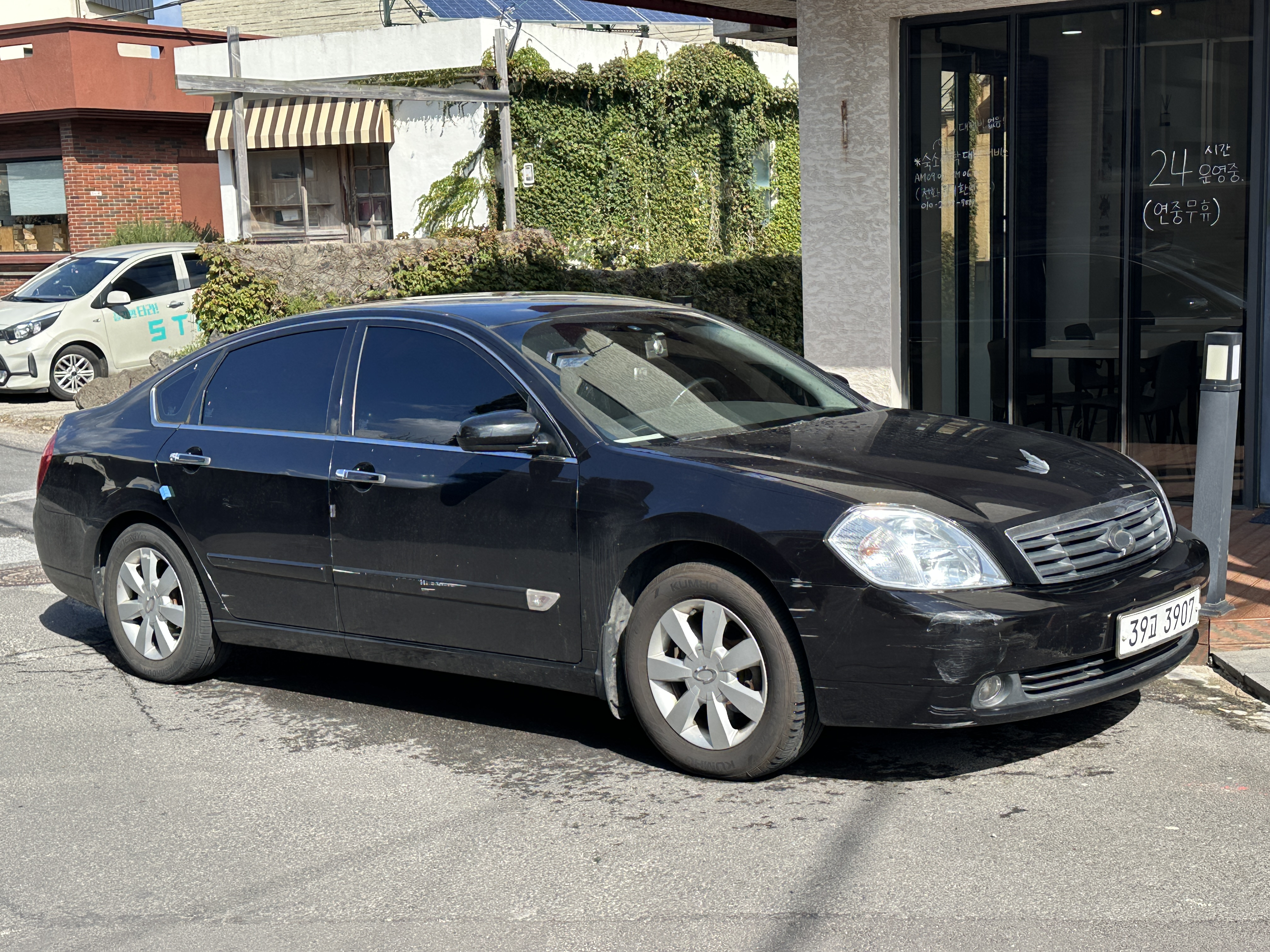
Samsung SM5 second generation

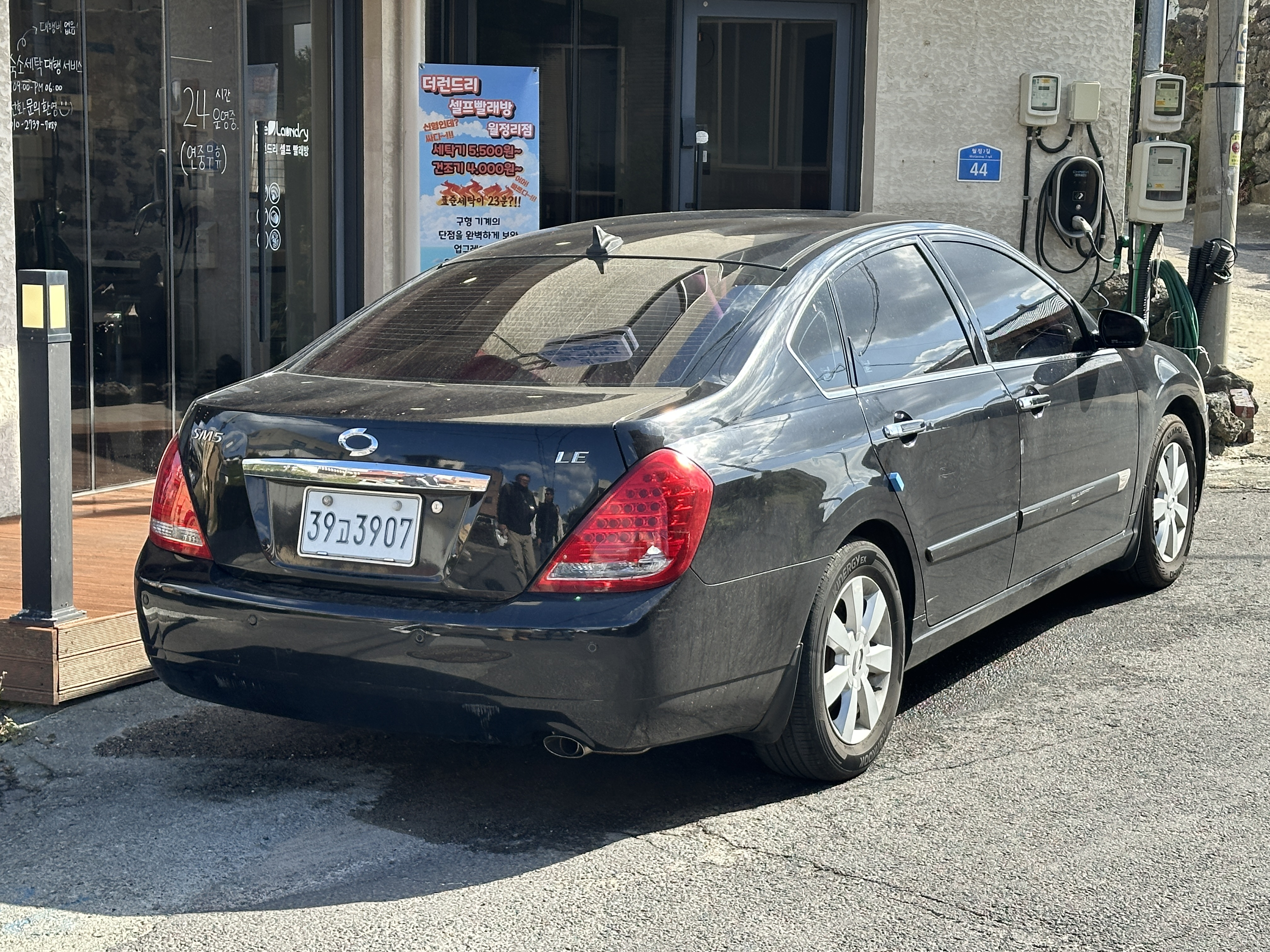
Rear
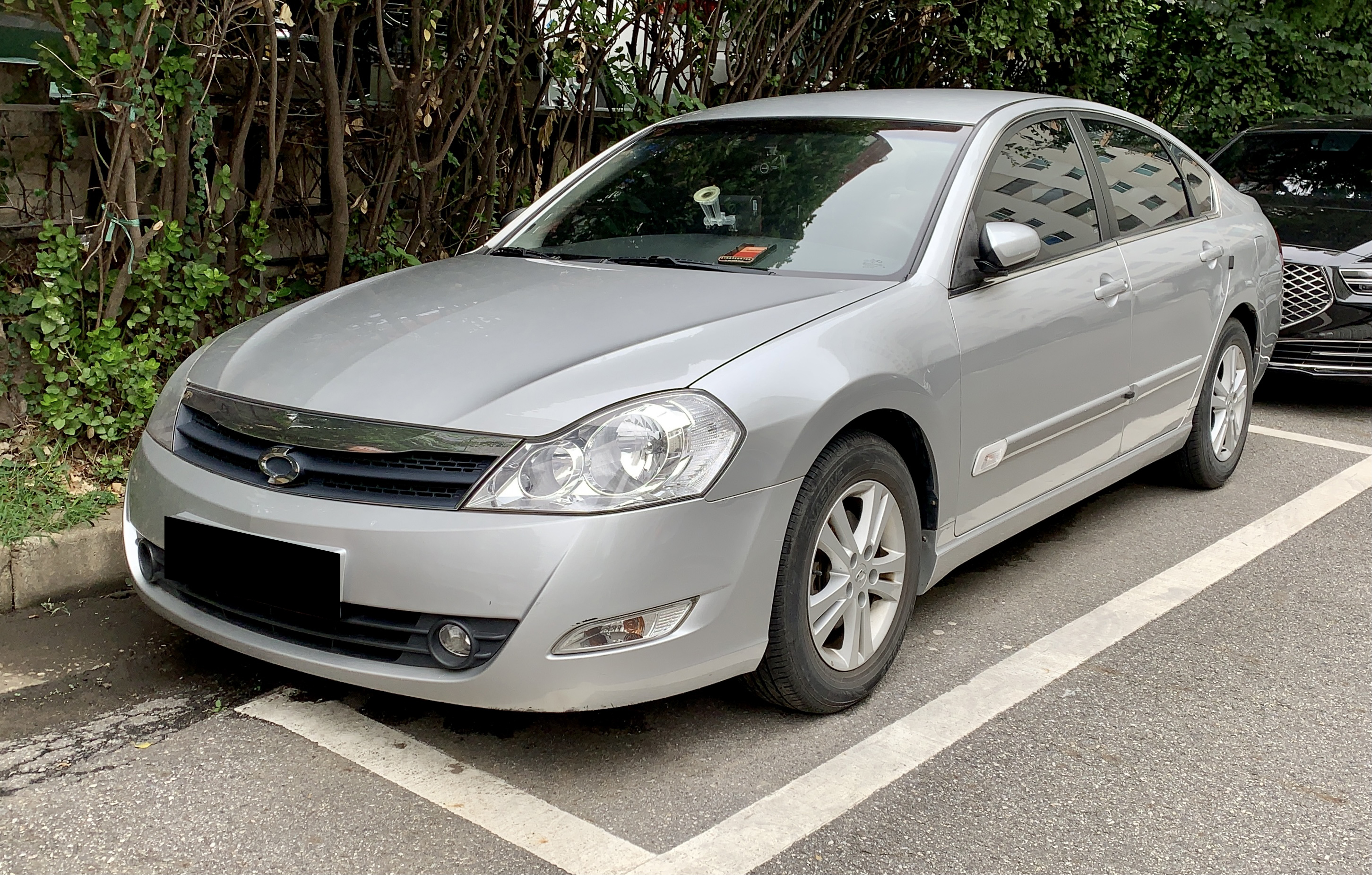
Samsung SM5 second generation facelift

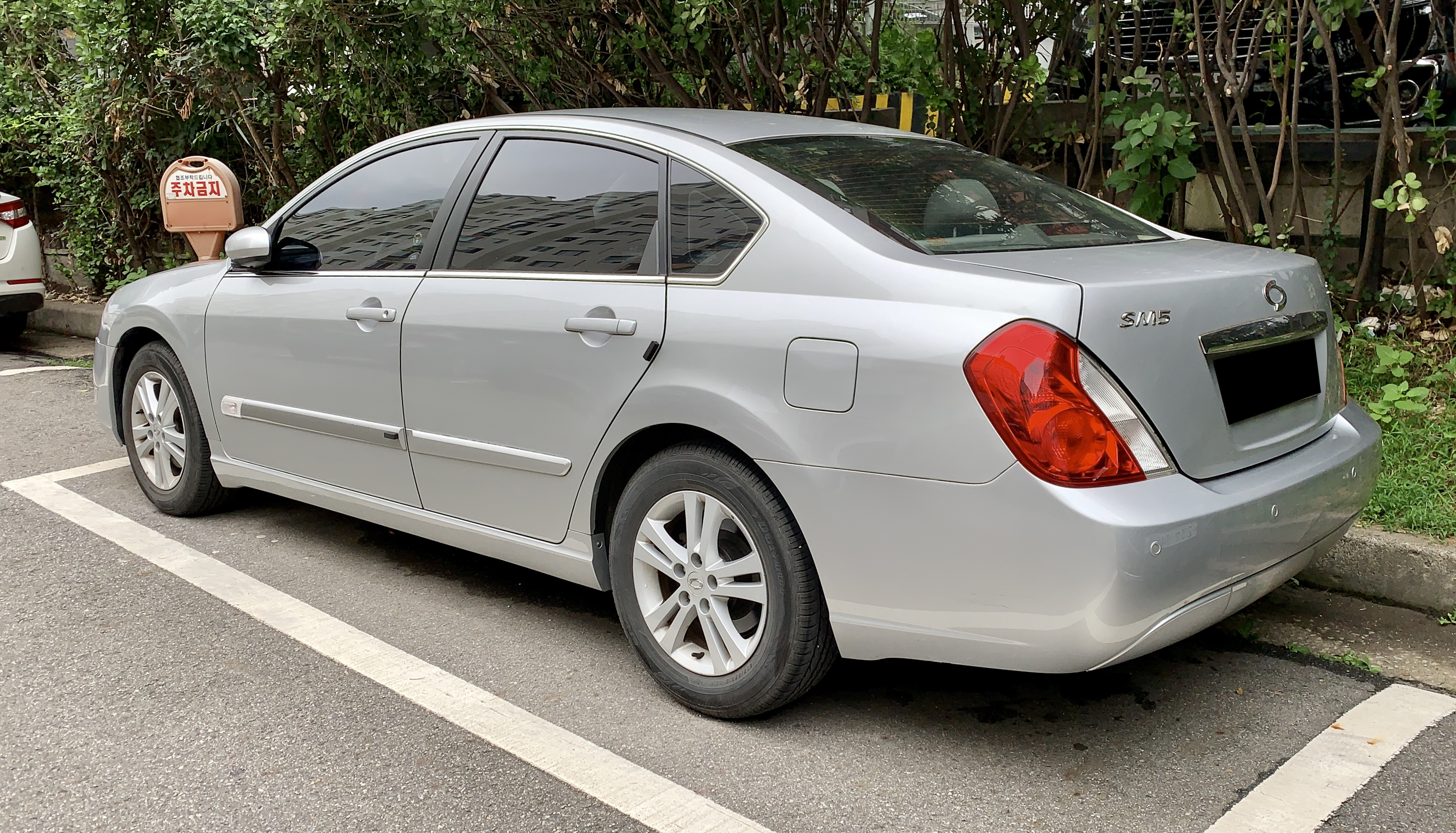
Rear

== Third generation (L43; 2009–2019) ==
Third generation (L43)
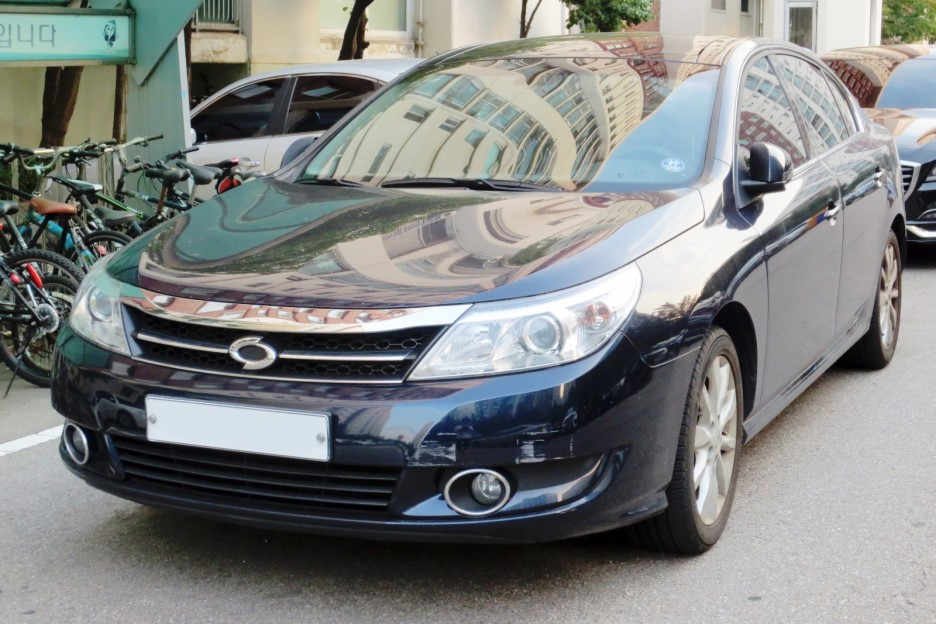

Overview
- Also called: Renault Latitude; Renault Safrane
- Production: 2009–2019

Body and chassis
- Platform: Renault/Nissan D platform
- Related: Renault Laguna III; Nissan Altima (L32); Nissan Teana (J32)

Powertrain
- Engine: 1.5 L K9K dCi I4 diesel; 1.6 L Nissan MR16DDT I4; 2.0 L Nissan MR20DD I4; 2.5 L Nissan VQ25DE V6
- Transmission: Xtronic CVT; 6-speed automatic (V6); 6-speed dual-clutch transmission

Dimensions
- Wheelbase: 2,760 mm (108.7 in)
- Length: 4,885 mm (192.3 in)
- Width: 1,830 mm (72.0 in)
- Height: 1,490 mm (58.7 in)
- Curb weight: 1,470 kg (3,240 lb)

On January 18, 2010, the third generation model was released and began to be sold along with the previous model. This model was seen in Australia being tested on its roads.

Based on the Renault Laguna and designed in Seoul, the New SM5 is manufactured at the firm’s Busan plant in South Korea. The SM5 was planned to be introduced in the U.S. and Canadian markets in 2014, under the Mitsubishi brand, but this plan has since been canceled.

It is available with a two-litre four-cylinder petrol engine, 2.5 litre six-cylinder petrol engine. The SM5 uses a Nissan Xtronic CVT transmission (V6 uses 6 Speed Automatic transmission).

In 2017, RSM recalled several SM5s built between October 1, 2013, and October 31, 2014 due to problems with the coolant temperature sensors.

The SM5 forms the basis to the Renault Latitude sold in the Asia-Pacific region. The new SM5 is once again sold in the Gulf States and Mexico as the Renault Safrane.

The SM6 is expected to be the SM5's successor since RSM did not announce a continuation of the model. Renault Samsung has ended production of the SM5 in 2019.

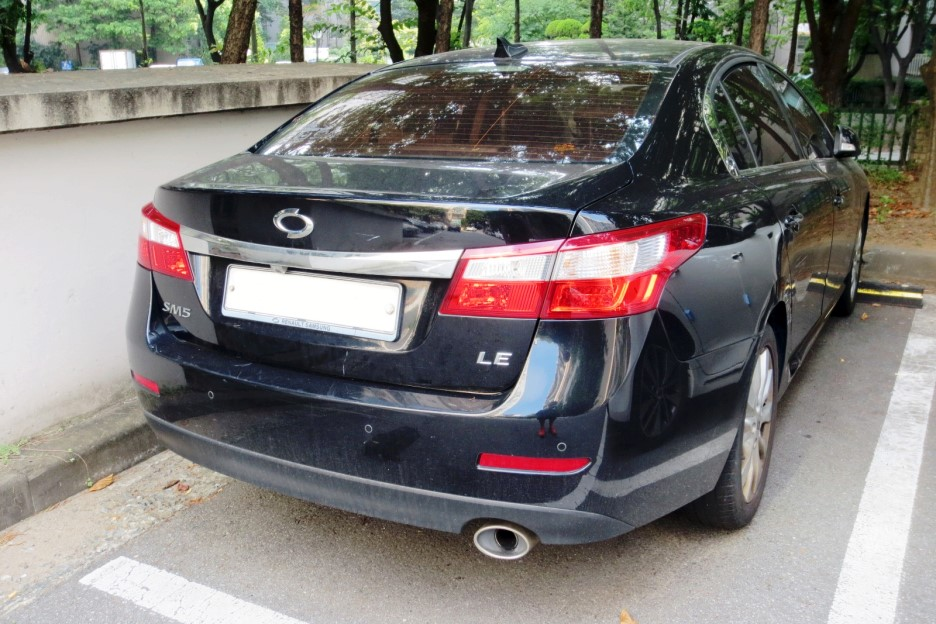
Rear view

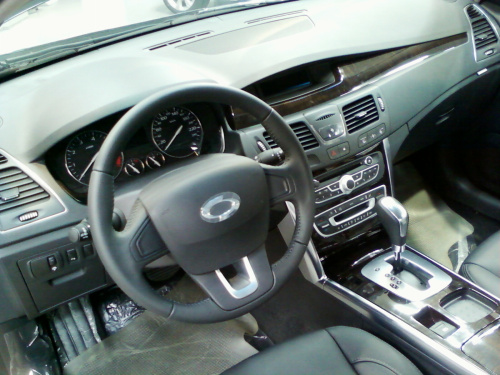
Interior

=== SM5 Platinum ===
In November 2012, a facelifted SM5 was launched, called the SM5 Platinum. The facelift included a new design to the front, revised dashboard features and retains the existing Nissan engines.

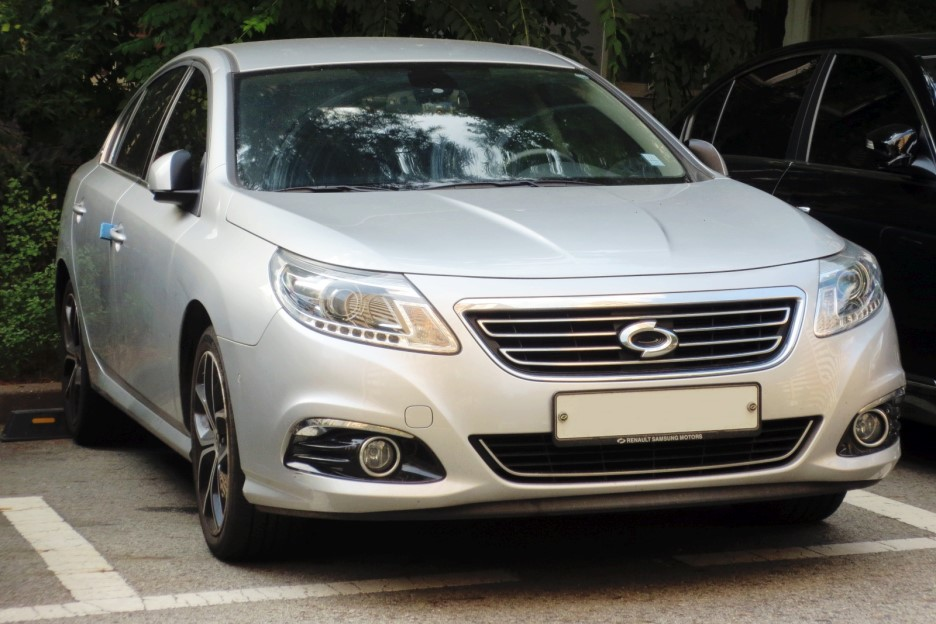
Front view

=== SM5 NOVA ===
In January 2015, another facelifted SM5 was launched, called SM5 NOVA. The second facelift included a new Renault-style grille to the front and DRL.

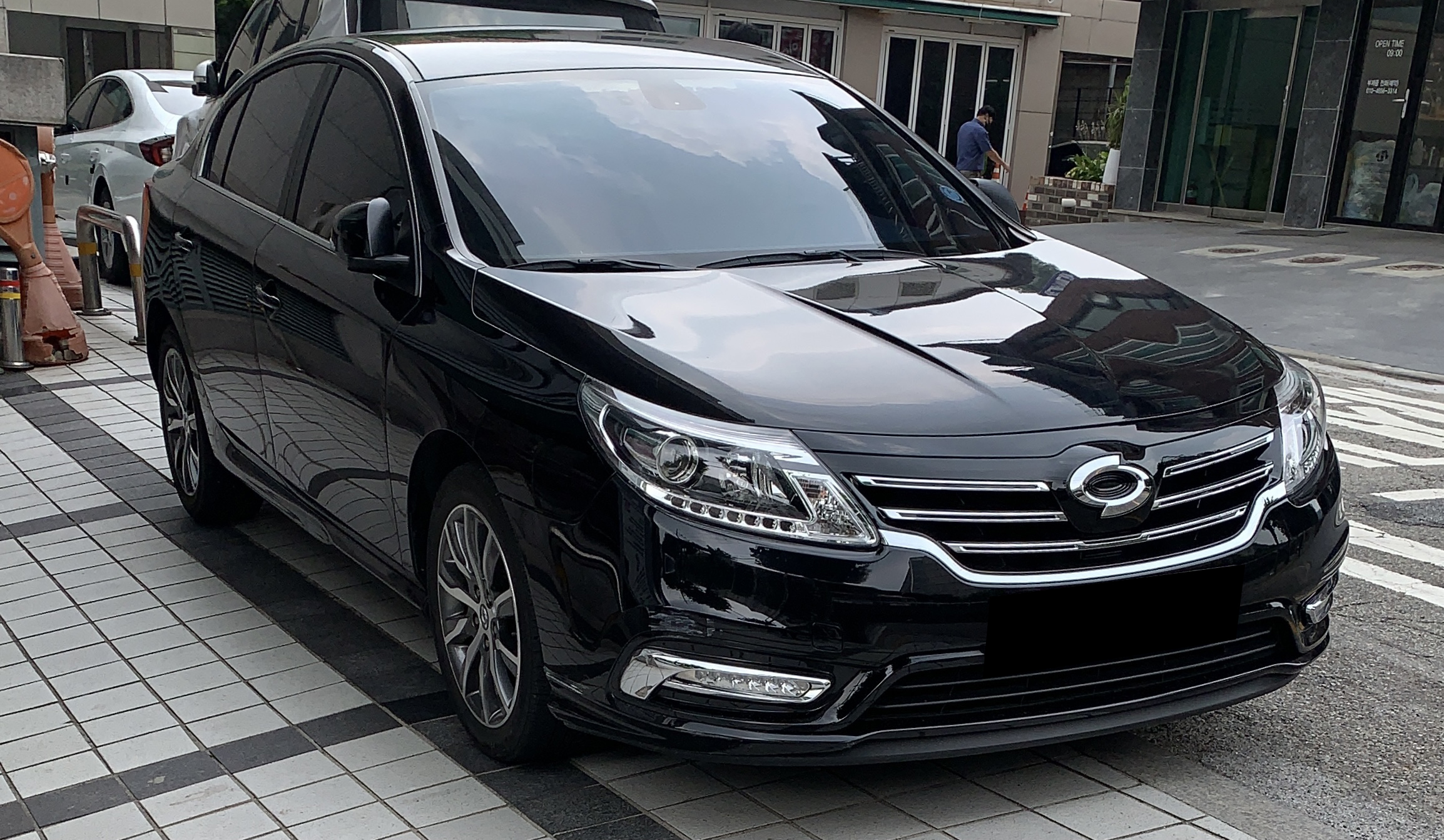
Front view

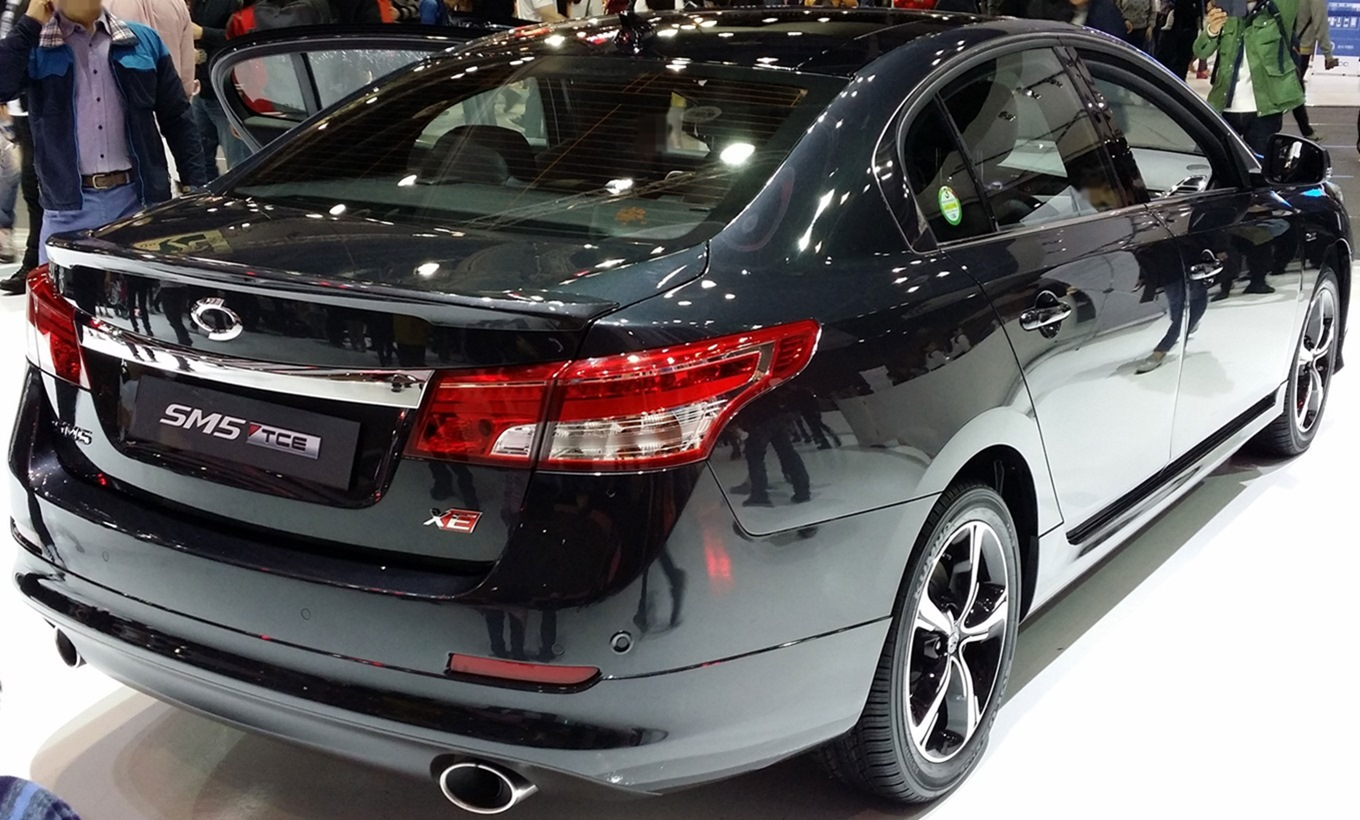
Rear view
