= PSA ES/L engine =

PSA-Renault ESL engine
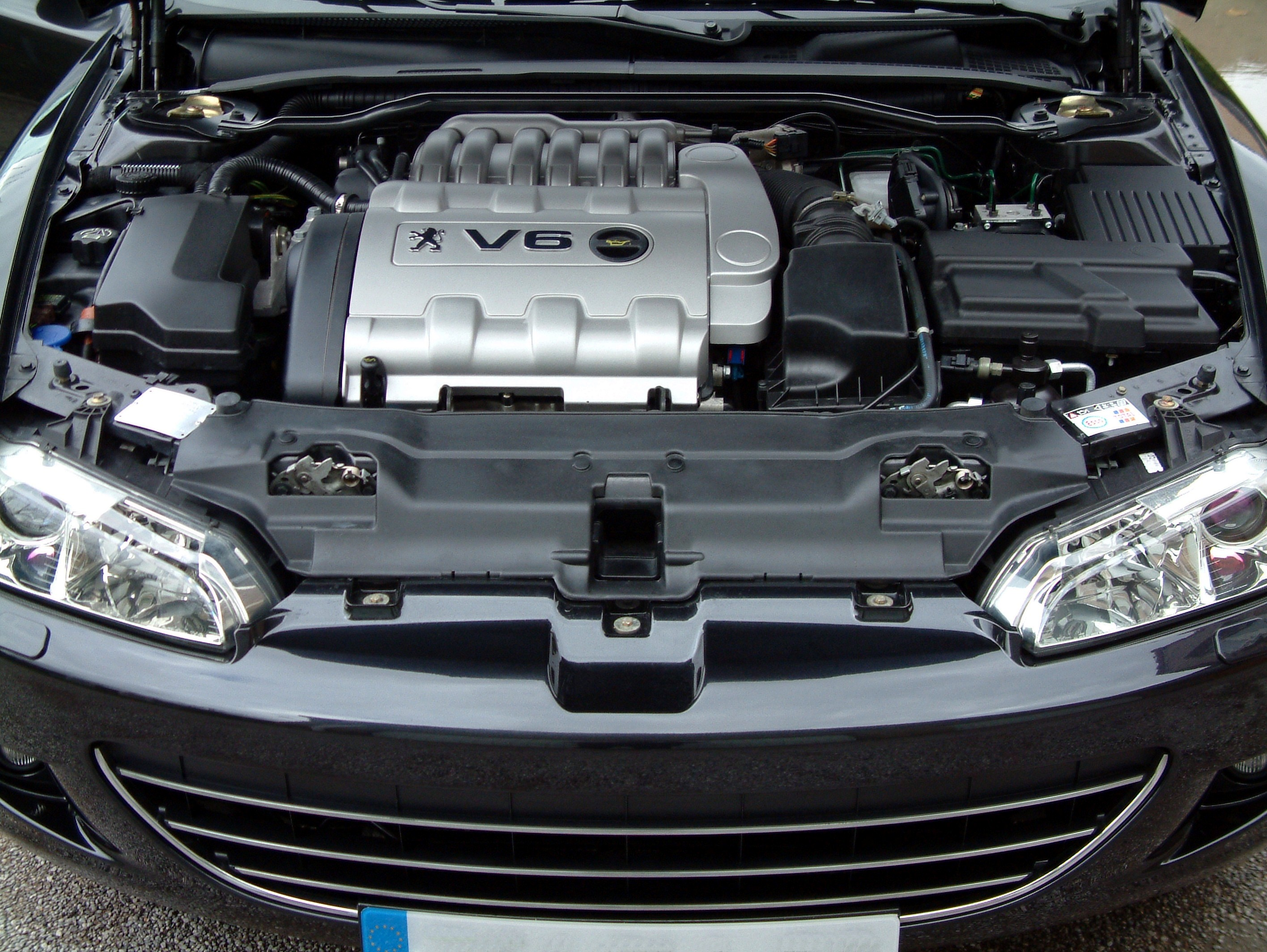
- ES9 J4S engine in a Peugeot 406 coupé

Overview
- Manufacturer: PSA Group; Renault
- Also called: PSA ES, Renault L
- Production: 1997–2010

Layout
- Configuration: 60° V6
- Displacement: 2.9 L (2,946 cc)
- Cylinder bore: 87 mm (3.43 in)
- Piston stroke: 82.6 mm (3.25 in)
- Cylinder block material: Aluminum alloy
- Cylinder head material: Aluminum alloy
- Valvetrain: DOHC 4 valves x cyl.

Combustion
- Turbocharger: In Venturi Atlantique 300 Bi-turbo
- Fuel system: Fuel injection
- Fuel type: Petrol
- Cooling system: Water-cooled

Output
- Power output: 140–228 kW (190–310 PS; 188–306 bhp)

Emissions
- Emissions control systems: Catalytic converter

Chronology
- Predecessor: V6 PRV engine
- Successor: Nissan VQ engine (Renault); Prince engine (PSA)

The PSA-Renault ESL engine is a V6 petrol engine used in automotive applications. It was co-developed by the PSA Group (Peugeot and Citroën) and Renault to replace the outdated V6 PRV engine. It was introduced in 1997 with the Peugeot 406 Coupé. It is designed and manufactured by the company "Française de Mécanique" for PSA and Renault. In PSA, the engine is known as the ES engine, in Renaults, the engine is known as the L engine.

Unlike the PRV V6, which was a 90° engine because it was developed from a V8 project, the ES/L has a traditional 60° V-angle. It is constructed entirely in aluminum, and available only in DOHC 24-valve format. Its sole iteration, the ES9 (PSA) or L7X (Renault), has a displacement of 2,946 cc (2.9 L), slightly less than the 3.0 L variant of the PRV. Bore and stroke is 87 mm × 82.6 mm (3.43 in × 3.25 in). A 3.3 L version was initially planned as well, but did not see production due to decreasing demand in V6 petrol engines in Europe and Renault's switch to Nissan-sourced V6 after its alliance with the Japanese carmaker.

Initially, the ESL produced 140 kW (190 PS; 188 bhp) in accordance with German and French insurance category limits in force at the time for engines under 3 litres. (The BMW 2.8 and Audi 2.8 produced the same figure circa 194 PS (143 kW; 191 bhp)) In 2000, Porsche retuned the Peugeot/Citroën version of the engine introducing variable valve timing on the intake camshafts varying between 0 and 40 degrees, improving fuel consumption, low engine speed flexibility for the introduction of the Peugeot 607 and Citroën C5. This iteration, called ES9 J4S, can now achieve 152 kW (207 PS; 204 bhp). In 2005, Peugeot/Citroën slightly upgraded the power to 155 kW (211 PS; 208 bhp). This version was not used by Renault who was by then focusing on Nissan-developed V6.

In 2000, Tom Walkinshaw Racing created a competition version for use in the Renault Clio V6. It could achieve a maximum of 206 kW (280 PS; 276 bhp) in racing trim, with a version detuned to 169 kW (230 PS; 227 bhp) for the road car. The road version's power was improved to 187 kW (254 PS; 251 bhp) by Renault Sport in 2004.

== ES9/L7X ==
The ES/L V6 has been used in a variety of cars from Citroën, Peugeot and Renault in the executive and luxury segments, namely the Citroën XM, Citroën Xantia, Citroën C5, Citroën C8 and Citroën C6; the Peugeot 406, 407, 605, 607 and 807; and the Renault Laguna (Mk.I and II), Espace (Mk.III), Renault Avantime, Renault Safrane and Clio V6. It was also modified by Venturi into a 310 PS (228 kW; 306 hp) twin-turbo in the last of their Atlantique 300 Bi-turbo cars. Unlike the PRV, it didn't have much of a career in motorsport, next to the Renault Sport Clio V6 Eurocup the engine was also used by Courage in the C52 and C60, as a 3.2 L bi-turbo engine, with a max output of 650 PS (478 kW). The engines are built by Sodemo.

== PSA ==
With Renault shifting to the Nissan VQ engine 3.5 L V6, PSA became the sole user of the ES until 2010 when the requirements of Euro 5 emission regulations began; the Euro 4-only ES engine was no longer available in Europe and replaced by The turbocharged Straight-4 Prince engine.

Model	Output
ES9 J4 / L7X	140 kW (190 PS; 188 bhp)
ES9 J4S	152 kW (207 PS; 204 bhp)
ES9 A	155 kW (211 PS; 208 bhp)

Note: All 24-valve with catalytic converter

== See also ==
- List of PSA engines
- List of Renault engines

== Sources ==
- Guide des moteurs Peugeot Citroën (in French)
- Abu Dhabi Peugeot 407 launch details
