= Fergus Pollock =

British car designer

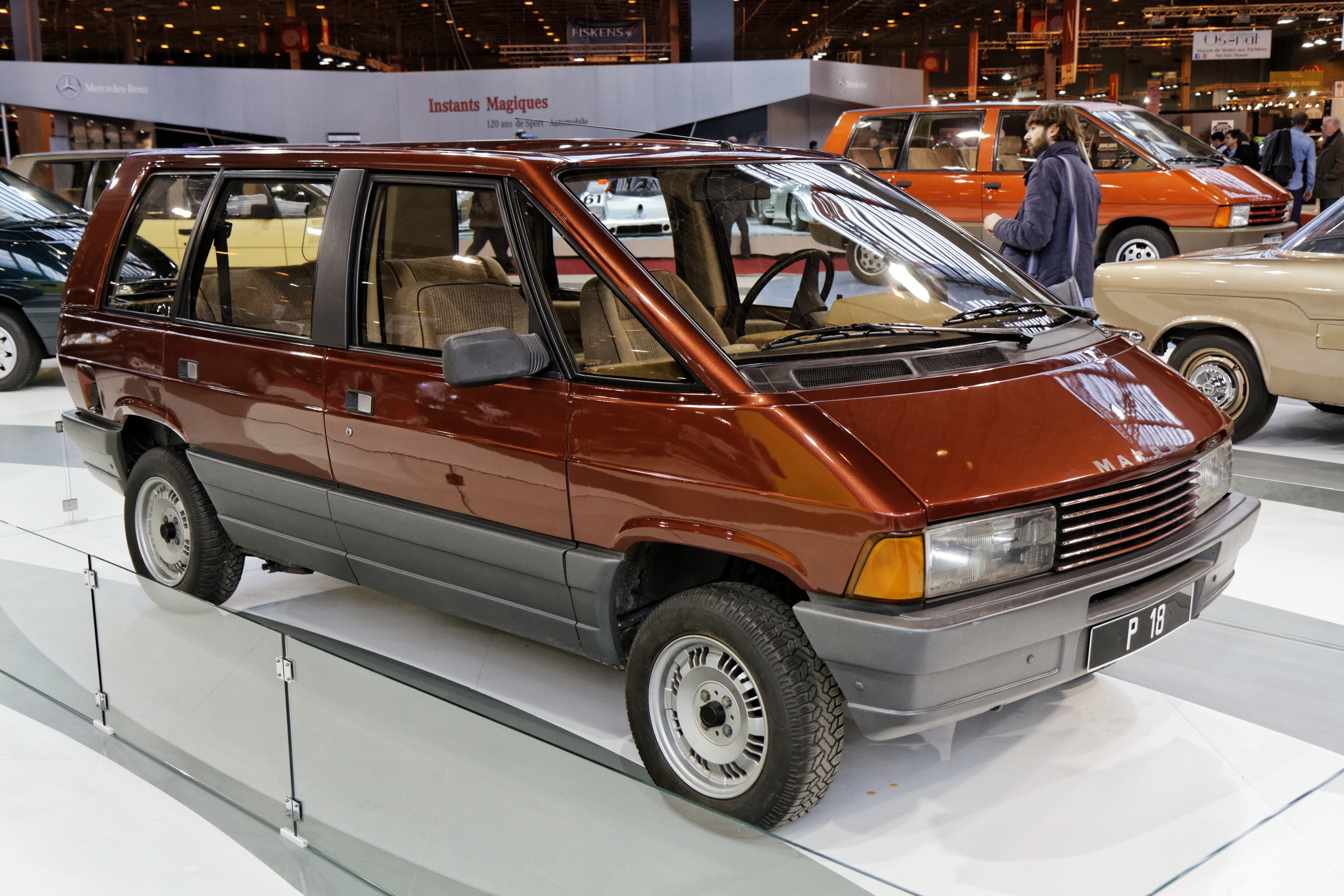
Matra P18 prototype, which would later be developed into the Renault Espace (2014)

Fergus Pollock is a British car designer. He is a Vehicle Design graduate of the British Royal College of Art, London. In 1975, he joined Rootes, which was Chrysler UK from 1971 to 1978, in Coventry, later working at Chrysler in the United States (Highland Park, 1976), followed by Simca (Carrieres Sous Poissy, 1979), and Citroën (Velizy, 1981). In 1983, he moved to Jaguar, and under Geoff Lawson, he became Senior Design Manager in 1995.

During his thirty year career, he has been actively involved in the design of over thirty cars, including rally and race cars, as well as trucks and aeroplanes. He pioneered the European MPV with the design of the "Supervan" project, while at Chrysler Europe, which would later be developed by Matra, and would eventually reach production as the Renault Espace.

Two of his designs have won the award for "The Most Beautiful Car In The World".

== Notable designs ==
- Renault Espace
- Jaguar XJS
- Jaguar XJ6
- Jaguar XK8
- Jaguar XJ8
