= Renault Espace =

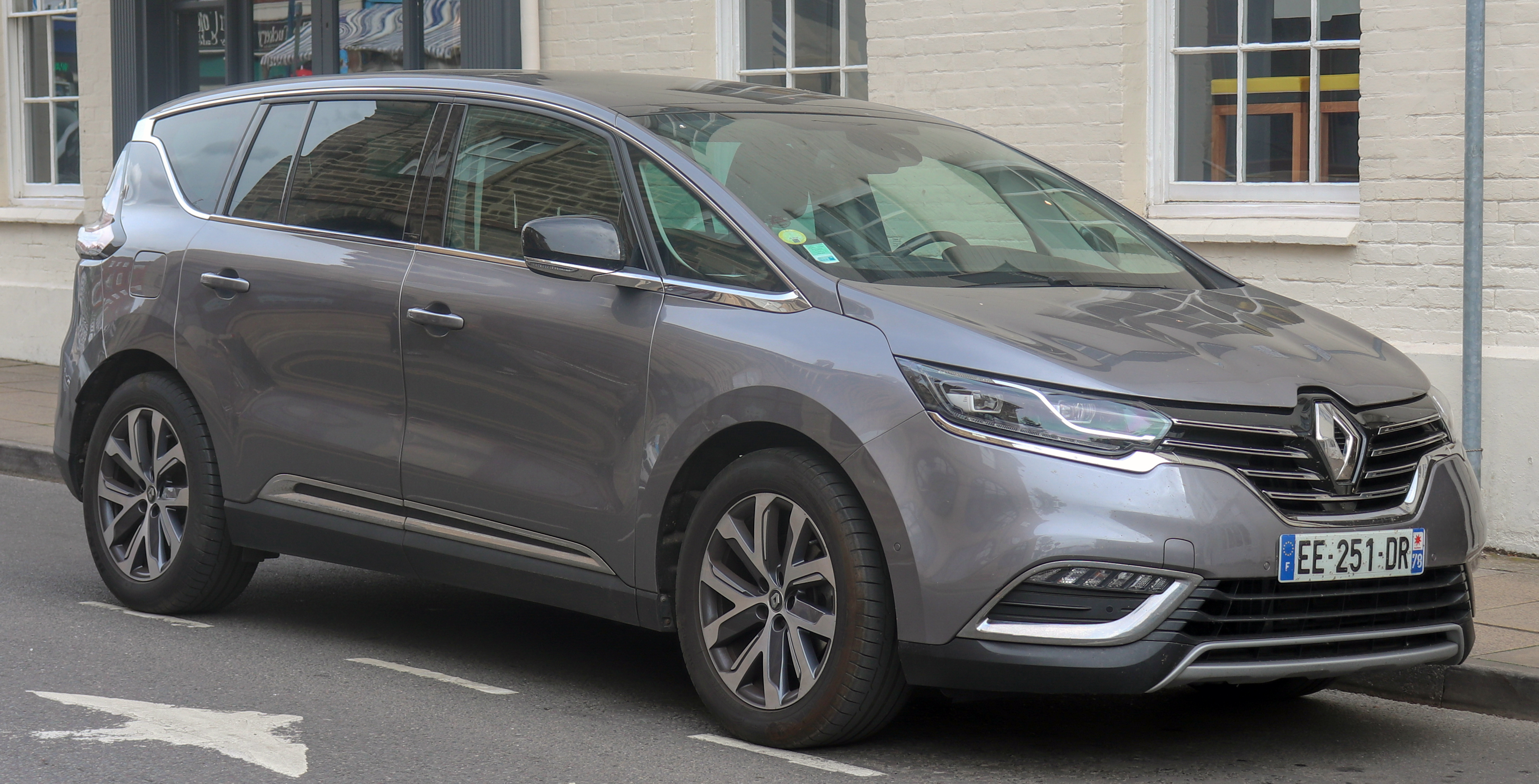
- Fifth generation Espace

Overview
- Manufacturer: Renault
- Production: 1984–present

Body and chassis
- Class: Large MPV (M) (1985–2014); Crossover MPV (M) (2015–2023); Mid-size crossover SUV (2023–present)
- Body style: 5-door MPV (1984–2023); 5-door SUV (2023–present)

The Renault Espace (French pronunciation: [ʁəno ɛspaːs]) is a series of automobiles manufactured by Renault since 1984. For its first five generations, the Espace was a multi-purpose vehicle/MPV (M-segment), but it has been redesigned as a mid-size crossover SUV for its sixth generation.

The first three generations of the Espace were amongst the first contemporary minivans or MPVs, and were manufactured by Matra for Renault. The fourth generation, also an MPV, was manufactured by Renault. The Renault Grand Espace is a long wheelbase version with increased rear leg room and boot size. The fifth generation is introduced with a crossover SUV-styled while keeping its MPV classification and body style. Renault described the fifth generation Espace as a 'crossover-style MPV' which combines elements of saloon, SUV and MPV, while retaining interior space and practicality of the latter. The sixth generation debuted in 2023 as a 7-seater SUV based on the Austral.

The name "espace" means "space" in French. In February 2012, the Espace was retired in the United Kingdom, as part of a cost-cutting plan.

== First generation (J11; 1984) ==
Espace I
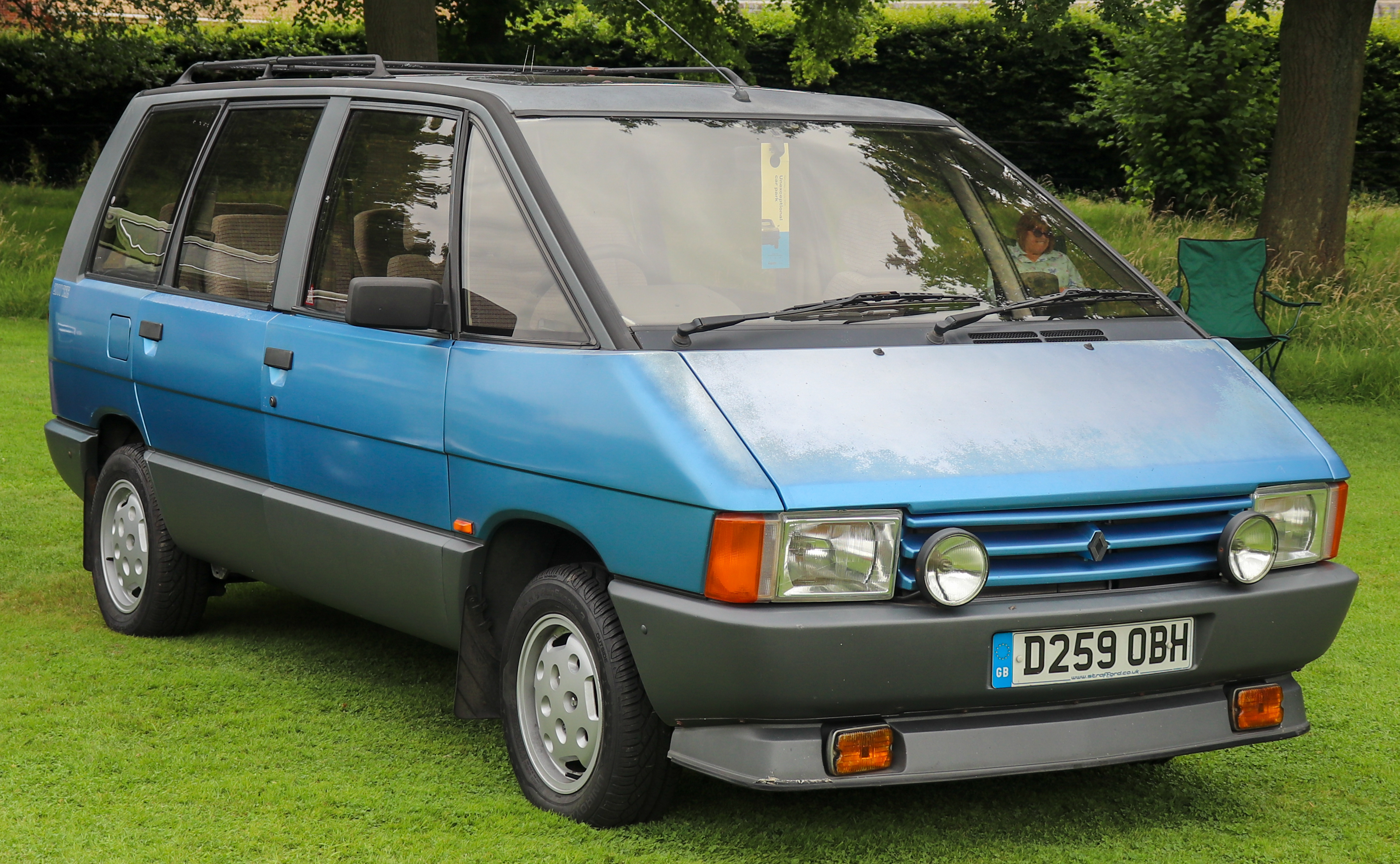
- 1987 Espace TSE 2.0

Overview
- Production: 1984–1991
- Assembly: France: Romorantin (Matra)
- Designer: Fergus Pollock; Antonis Volanis

Body and chassis
- Layout: Front-engine, front-wheel-drive / four-wheel-drive

Powertrain
- Engine: Petrol: 1995 cc J6R/J7R I4; 2165 cc J7T I4; Diesel: 2068 cc J8S-852 turbodiesel I4
- Transmission: 5-speed NG3 manual

Dimensions
- Wheelbase: 2,580 mm (101.6 in)
- Length: 4,250 mm (167.3 in) (petrol)
- Width: 1,777 mm (70.0 in)
- Height: 1,660 mm (65.4 in)

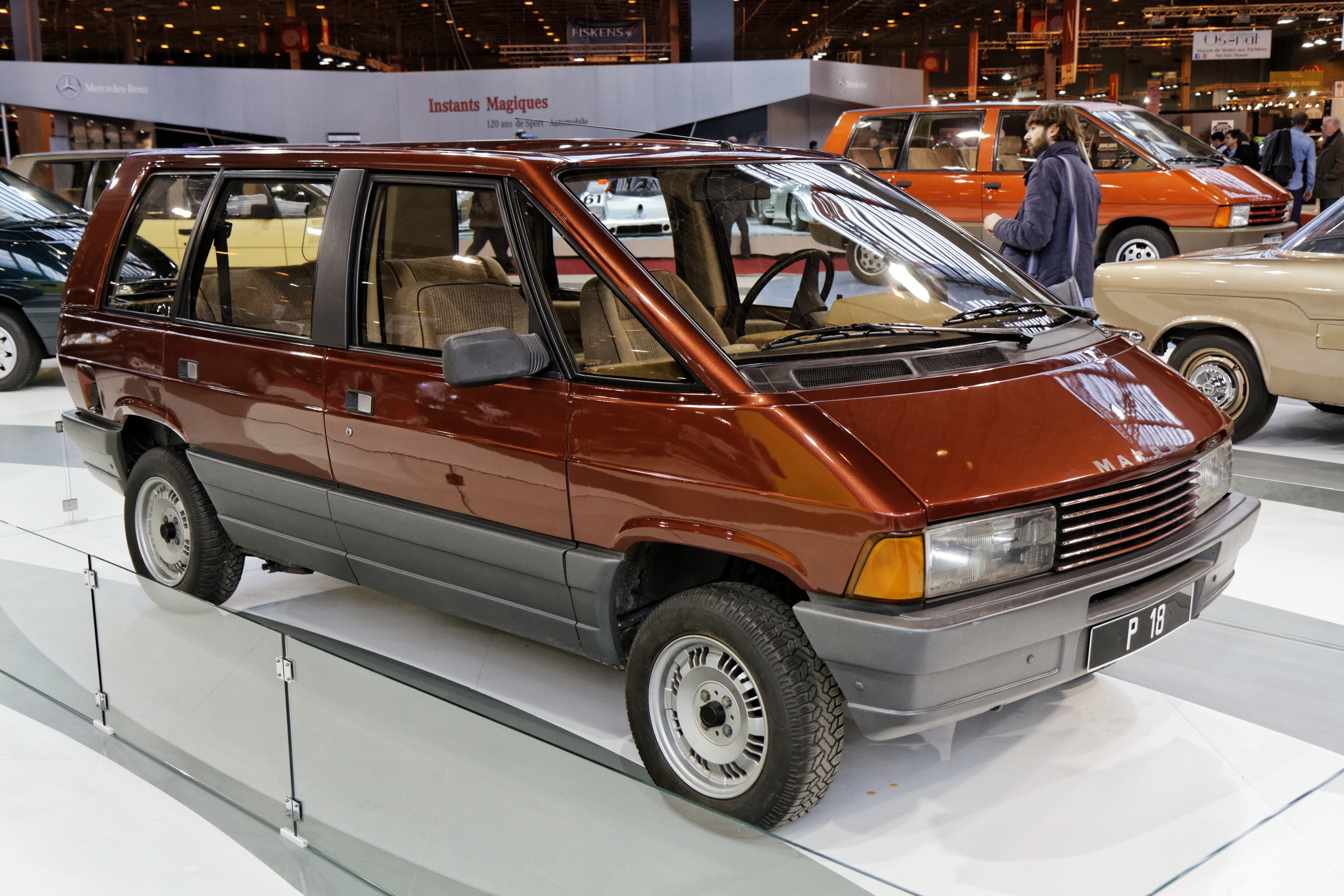
Matra P18 prototype, which would later be developed into the Renault Espace

The Espace concept was originally conceived in the 1970s by the British designer Fergus Pollock, who was working for Chrysler UK, at its design centre at Whitley in Coventry. Matra, spearheaded by Greek designer Antonis Volanis, developed the design for Simca, the then French subsidiary of Chrysler, with the intent of marketing the vehicle as a Talbot. It would replace the Matra Rancho leisure activity vehicle on the Matra production lines. Early prototypes used Simca parts, and hence featured a grille reminiscent of the Simca 1307 (Chrysler Alpine).

In 1978, six years before the Espace went into production, Chrysler UK and Simca were sold to the French company PSA Peugeot Citroën, which phased out Simca within a decade because of falling sales. PSA decided the Espace was too expensive and too risky a design to put into production, preferring to focus on nursing Talbot back to financial health. The design was returned to Matra, who called it the Matra P23 and took the idea to Renault.

Renault adopted the Matra concept as project J11, which was then given the name "Espace." One restraint was that Renault used longitudinally mounted engines whereas the P23 had been designed with the more efficient transverse layout in mind. The design ended up using the longitudinal layout, which allowed for more flexibility in engine fitment and also made developing a four-wheel-drive version easier. Installing the PRV V6 had been considered from early on but ended up having to wait until the introduction of the second generation. To make the engine installation as short as possible, the radiator was placed to the left in the engine compartment, with the engine reaching the grille. The compact installation necessitated an extended front end for turbodiesel models as this engine was longer; these have a protruding grille and a correspondingly larger front bumper. Renault improved on Matra's original design by insisting on an entirely flat floor in the entire area behind the front seats.

The design featured a body of fibreglass, mounted on a warm-galvanised steel monocoque spaceframe, using the same technique and assembly line at the factory as the Talbot Matra Murena. The galvanization process increased torsional rigidity by 60 per cent and bending resistance by 20 per cent, at a cost of a 30 kg (66 lb) weight gain. Weight distribution was rather front heavy, with 62.9 per cent of the weight being over the front wheels (original petrol version).

The Espace was eventually launched by Renault in July 1984. After a slow start, with a mere nine Espaces sold in the first month, consumers realised the benefits of the MPV concept and the Espace became popular. The introduction of the Espace required the relatively small Matra factory to cease production of the Murena to make room for the Espace. It was sold in the United Kingdom from August 1985. In October 1984 the turbodiesel versions Turbo D and Turbo DX arrived.

In 1984, American Motors Corporation (AMC) announced it would begin to market the front wheel drive Espace in the United States. The minivan was exhibited to consumers at the 1985 Chicago Auto Show, but AMC's negotiations with Matra continued over the vehicle's import pricing. Plans for the Espace to be launched in the United States ended with the purchase of AMC by Chrysler.

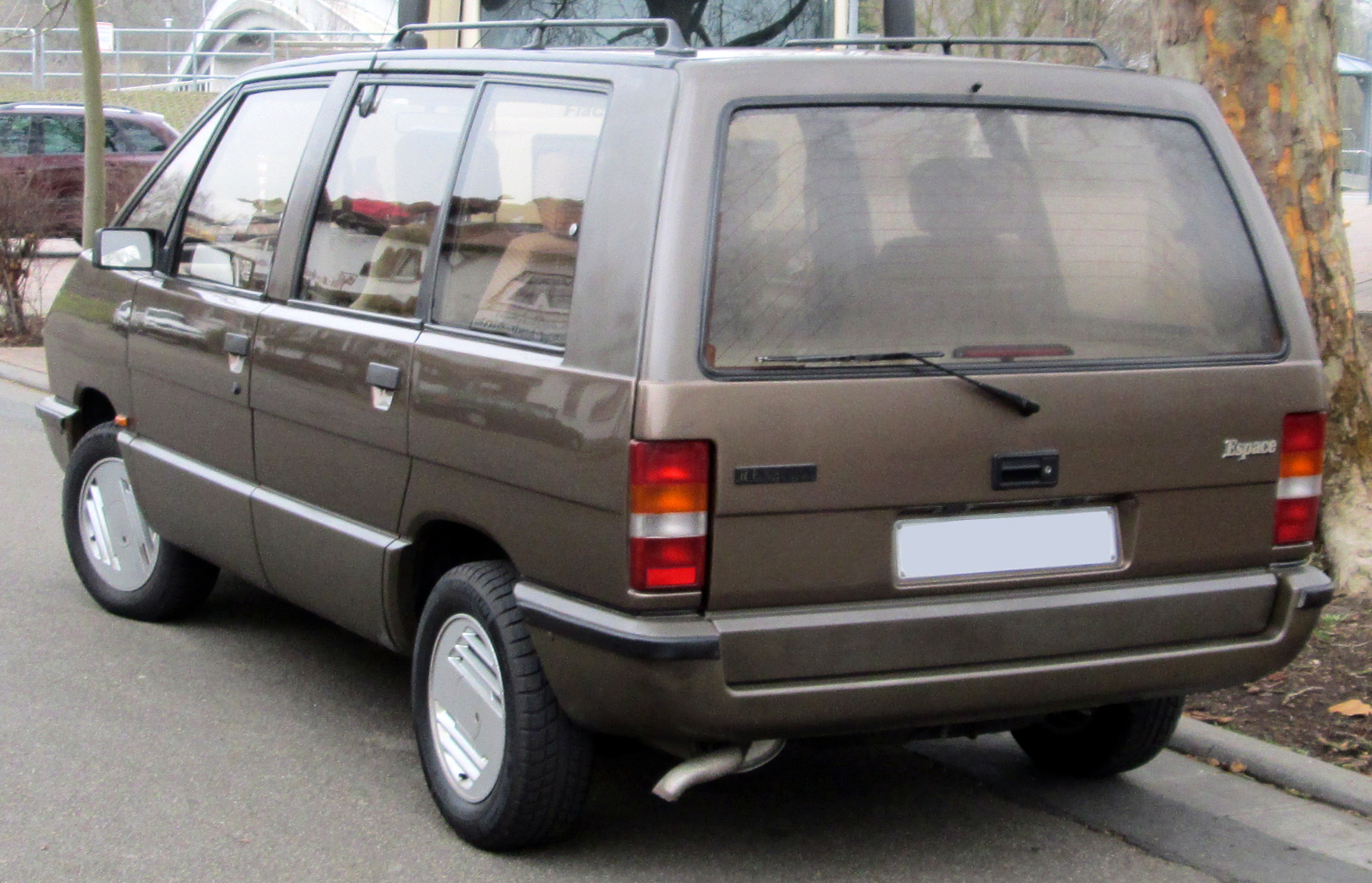
Pre-facelift Renault Espace

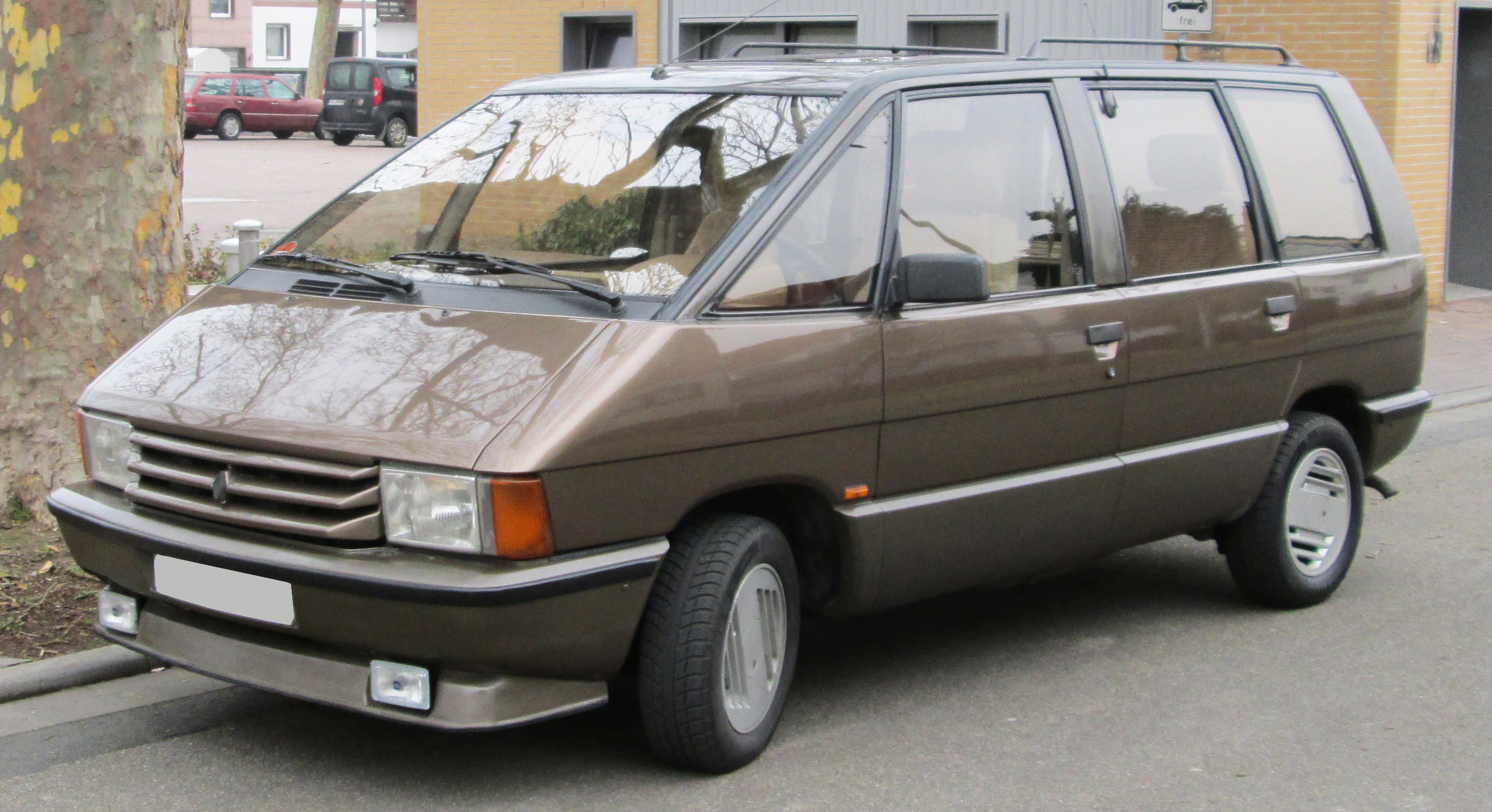
Phase I turbodiesel, showing the larger front grille

In 2004, BBC's motoring show Top Gear set up a race between two Espaces, a Toyota Previa, a Toyota MasterAce, a Mitsubishi Space Wagon, and a Nissan Serena. The Espaces came first and second - although as Jeremy Clarkson pointed out, Richard Hammond was driving a V6 Espace, giving him a performance advantage over the other vehicles.

=== Facelift ===
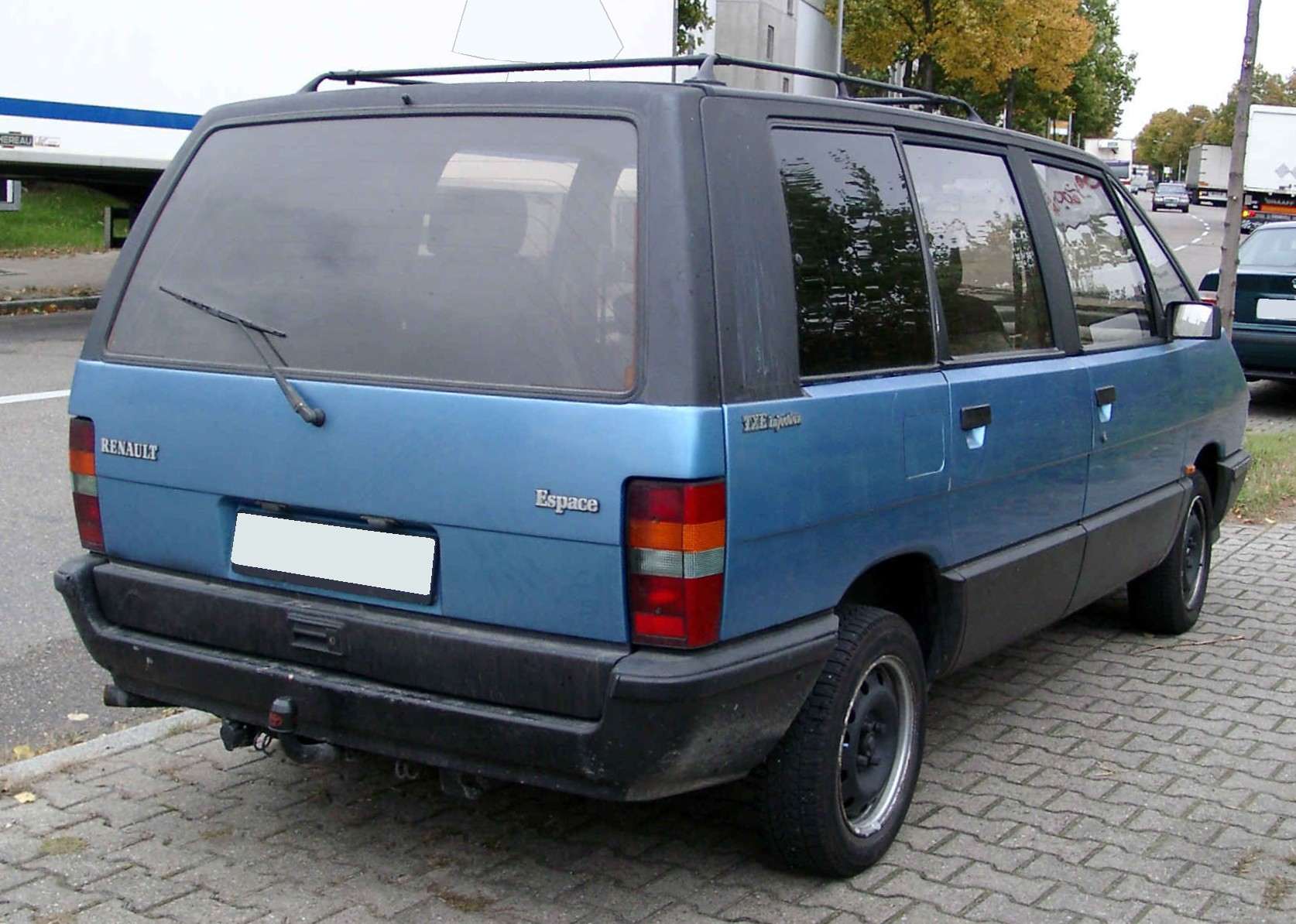
Renault Espace (facelift)

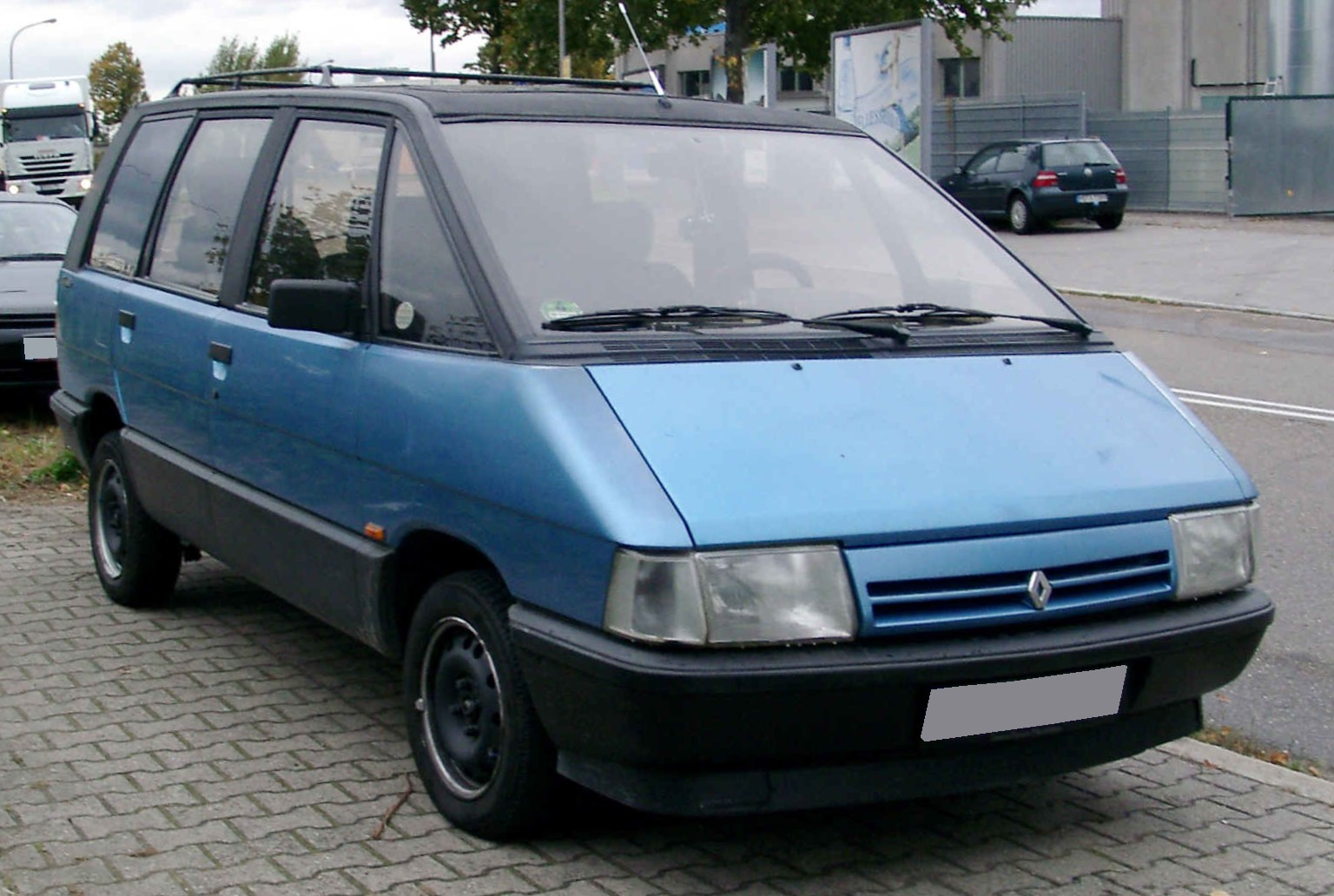
Renault Espace (facelift)

Building upon its success, the Espace was revamped in 1988, with most of the remaining Talbot/Simca content being replaced by equivalent Renault parts. The chassis and mechanical components of the car remained largely unchanged.

The most obvious cosmetic exterior difference, between the very first Espaces and the revamped post 1988 models, were the changed headlights: the forward-slanting lights with orange indicator casing of the original Espace were replaced with backward-slanting lights, with a clear indicator casing.

Along with the changes in design, a four-wheel-drive version called Quadra was also introduced.

=== Grancar Futura ===
Brazilian Ford Concessionaire Grancar, in cooperation with Toni Bianco, developed a faithful copy of the original Espace in Brazil in 1990. Called the Grancar Futura, it was powered by four-cylinder engines (AP1800/AP2000) from Ford/Volkswagen's local lineup, while using the dashboard from the Ford Del Rey and the Escort's fuel tank.

With Renault upset about intellectual property infringement and market liberalization undercutting the car's raison d'être, the Futura came to an end in the end of 1991, after 159 cars had been built.

== Second generation (J63; 1991) ==
Espace II
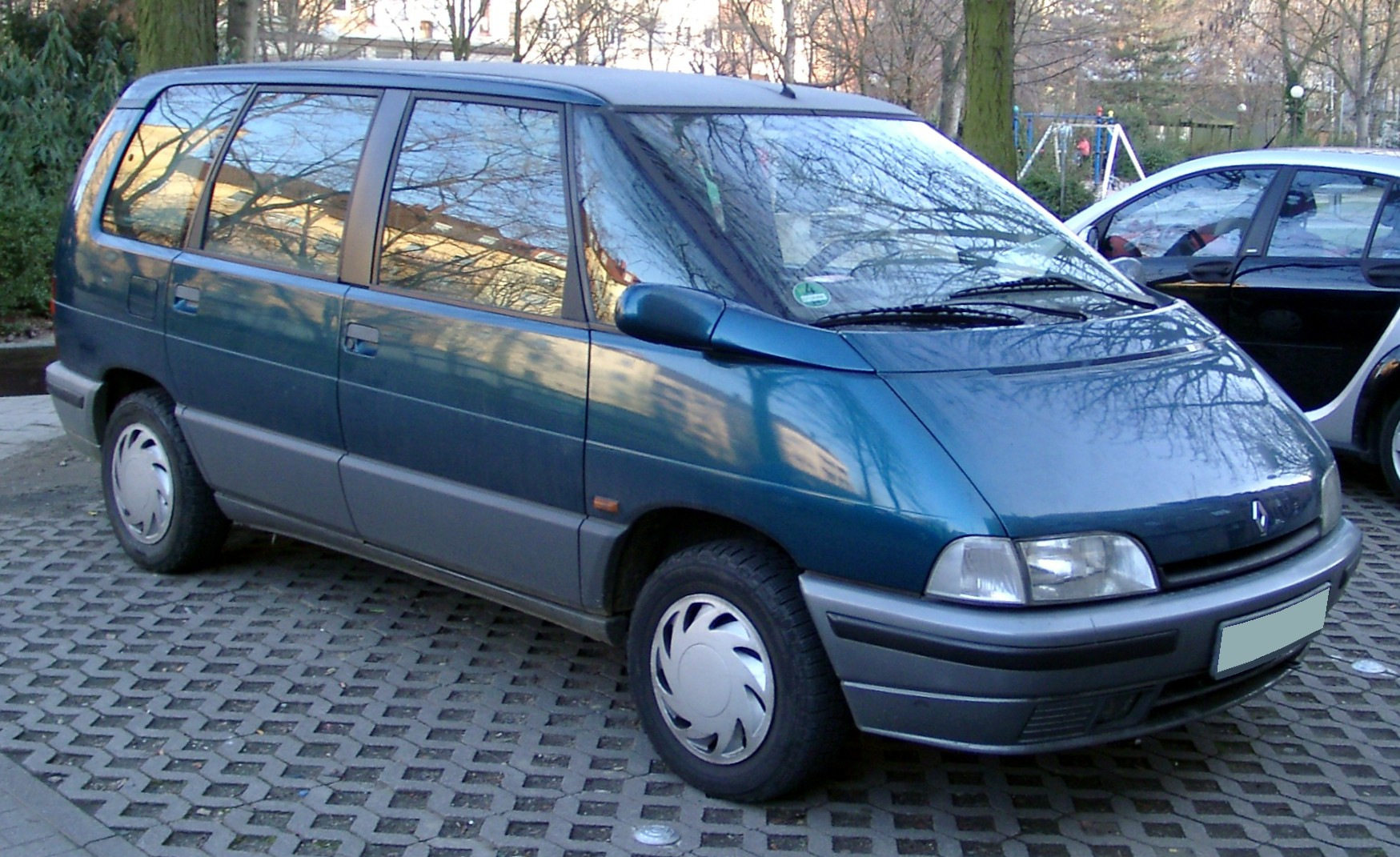

Overview
- Also called: Renault Univers (China)
- Production: 1991–1997 (F); 1994–1999 (PRC)
- Assembly: France: Romorantin (Matra); China: Xiaogan (SRAC)

Body and chassis
- Layout: Front-engine, front-wheel-drive / four-wheel-drive

Powertrain
- Engine: Petrol: 2.0 L J7R I4; 2.2 L J7T I4; 2.8 L Z7W V6; Diesel: 2.1 L J8S-852 turbo I4
- Transmission: 5-speed manual 4-speed automatic

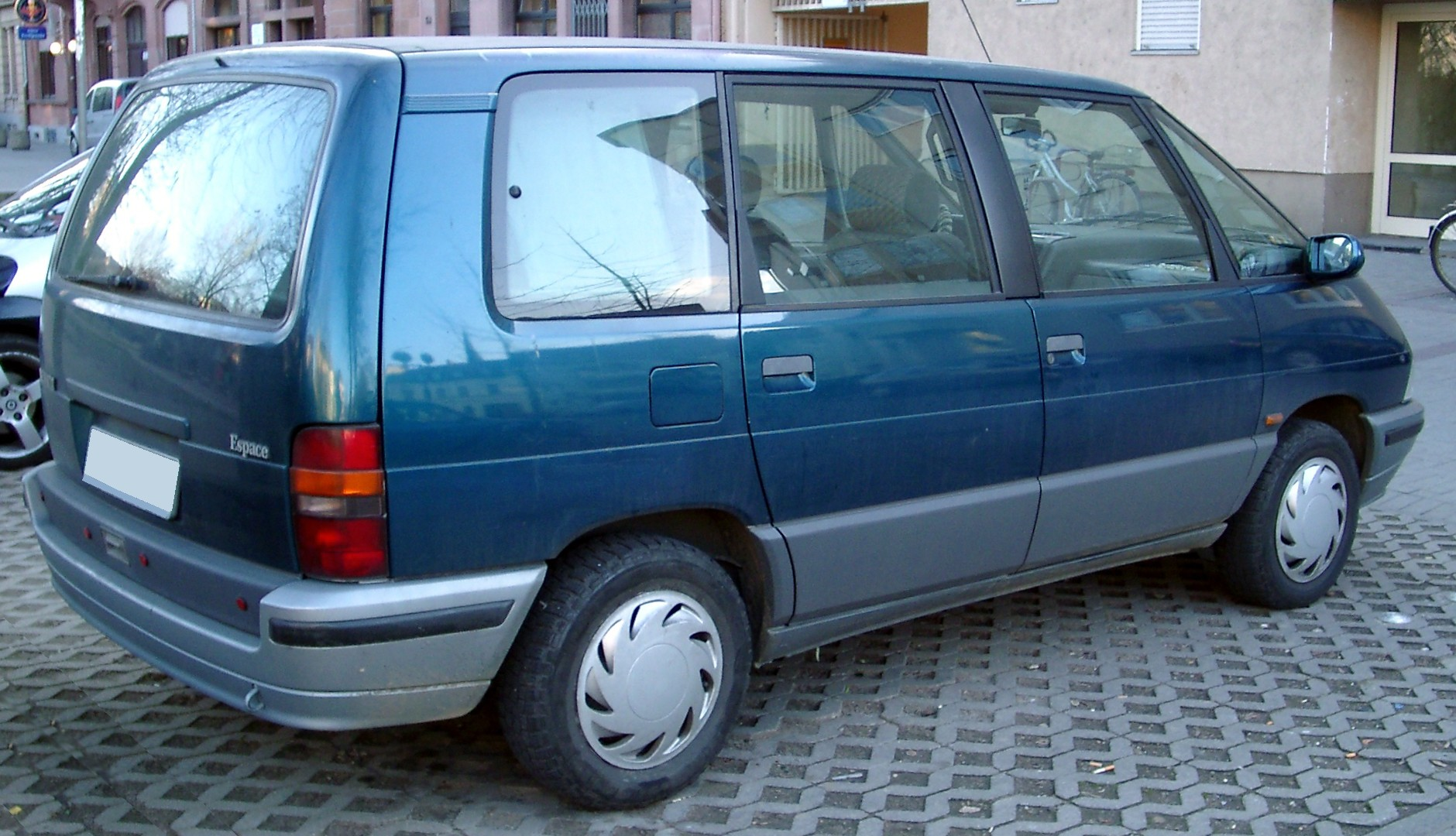
Renault Espace (rear)

A heavily revised Espace was launched in January 1991, adopting the Renault family look, to replace the Talbot themed styling of the original. This was essentially a reskin of the original car, with a new dashboard and other interior improvements. The chassis was left unchanged. Matra's facilities still limited production and deliveries were highly allocated during the first few years. New was the option of a V6 engine, the company's 2,849-cc PRV V6 with 153 PS (113 kW). Four-wheel-drive ("Quadra") was only available with the 2.2-litre petrol four; an automatic transmission was initially not offered.

The second generation saw mostly minor changes during its lifespan. A four-speed automatic option was added to the V6. In 1995 a version of the turbodiesel with a variable vane turbocharger was added to the lineup; thanks to this, power increased from 88 to 92 PS (65 to 68 kW). Main production ceased in October 1996, after 316,419 examples had been built, before the final examples rolled off from the showroom during the summer of 1997. This generation Espace was also "assembled" in China, where Sanjiang Renault Automobile received nearly complete Espaces and sold them as locally assembled product thanks to loopholes in the Chinese CKD regulations.

=== Espace Biturbo Quadra ===
A high performance prototype (P46) called the Espace Biturbo Quadra was also proposed by Matra in 1990, before the second generation Espace entered production. It was to use the same engine that was later installed in the Safrane Biturbo, which produced around 270 PS (199 kW).

However, it never entered production due to the concern of its stability, and only a single prototype remains today. The estimated performance figures of it were: 0–100 km/h (0–62 mph) around 7.5 seconds, top speed above 230 km/h (140 mph).

=== Espace F1 ===
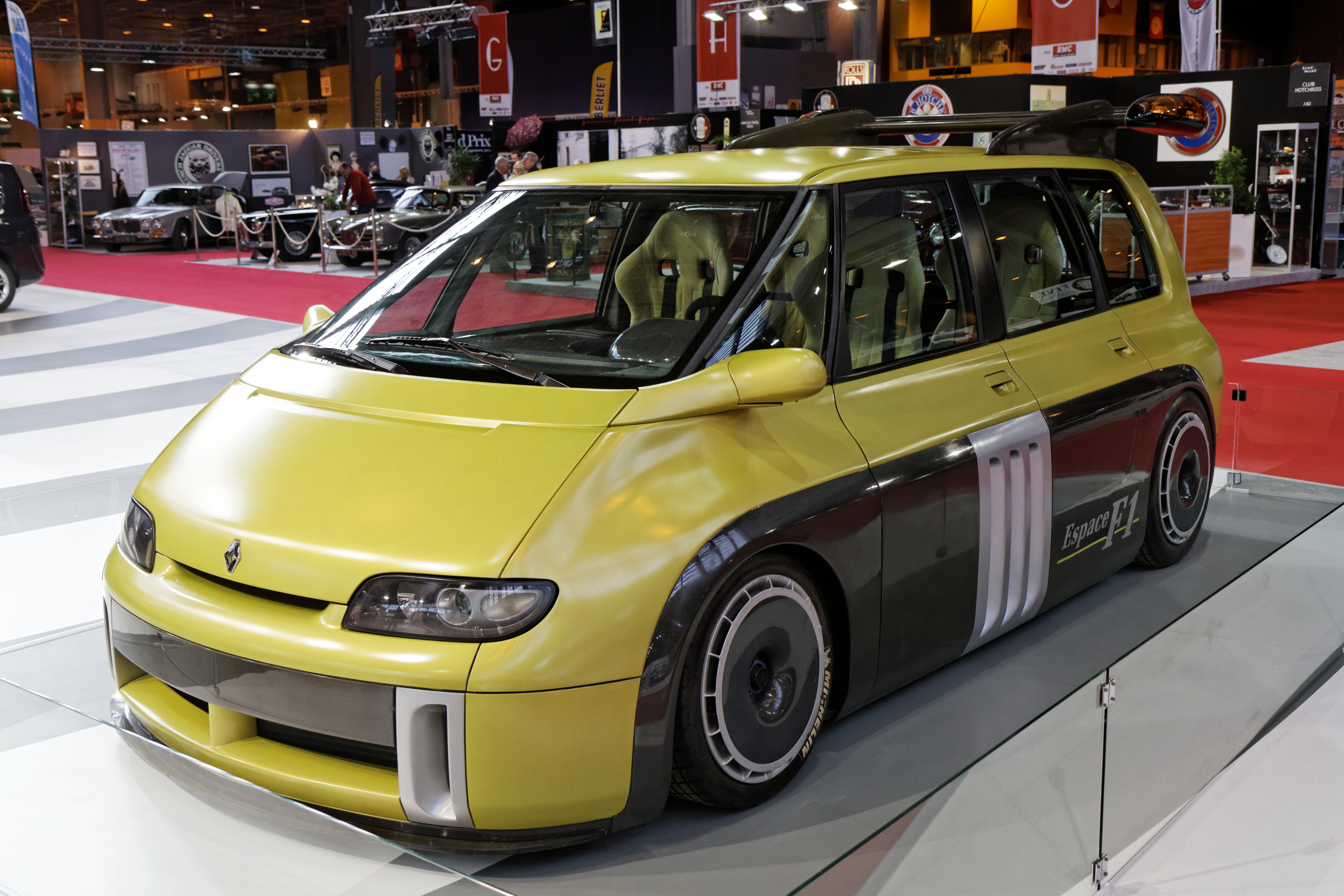

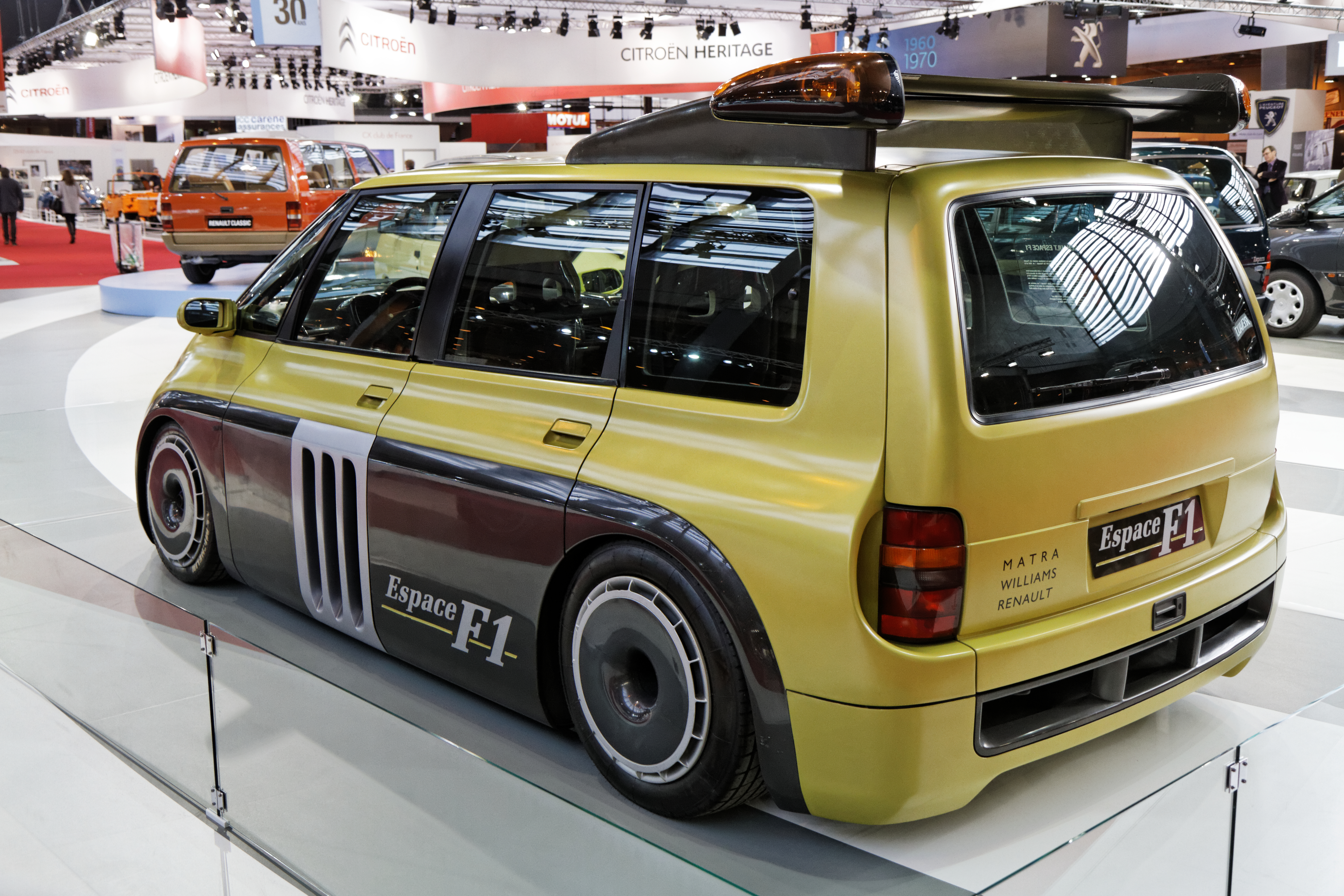
Renault Espace F1 at the Rétromobile 2014

In 1995, Renault displayed a show car called the Espace F1, which was created by Matra to celebrate both the tenth anniversary of the Espace and Renault's involvement in Formula One racing. Though it resembled an Espace with substantial bodywork changes, the vehicle had more in common with a Formula One car.

The vehicle used a lightweight carbon fibre F1 style chassis in combination with a carbon fibre reinforced Espace J63 series body (as opposed to fibreglass on the standard model). Powering the Espace F1 was an 800 PS (588 kW; 789 hp) (upgraded from its original rating of 700 PS (515 kW; 690 hp)) 3.5 litre, forty valve Renault RS5 V10 engine, as used in the 1993 Williams-Renault FW15C.

As with an F1 car, the V10 engine was mid engined (as opposed to the conventional front-engined layout) and the power was transmitted to the rear wheels via a six speed semi automatic gearbox, also used in the Williams FW15C.

The engine and transmission allowed the Espace F1 to accelerate from 0–100 km/h (0–62 mph) in 2.8 seconds, 0–200 km/h (0–124 mph) in 6.9 seconds and carry on accelerating to a top speed of 312 km/h (194 mph).

With the use of carbon ceramic brakes, the Espace F1's deceleration was no less impressive than its acceleration: the car could accelerate from 0–270 km/h (0–168 mph) and brake to a complete halt in under 600 metres (1,969 ft).

This version of the Espace was featured in sim racing video game Gran Turismo 2, and a slightly altered version has made a return in Gran Turismo 7 in 2025, 26 years after its initial appearance. Frank Williams was a noted passenger of the Espace F1, chauffeured by Williams driver David Coulthard. The Espace F1 currently resides in the Matra Museum in France.

== Third generation (JE0; 1996) ==
Espace III
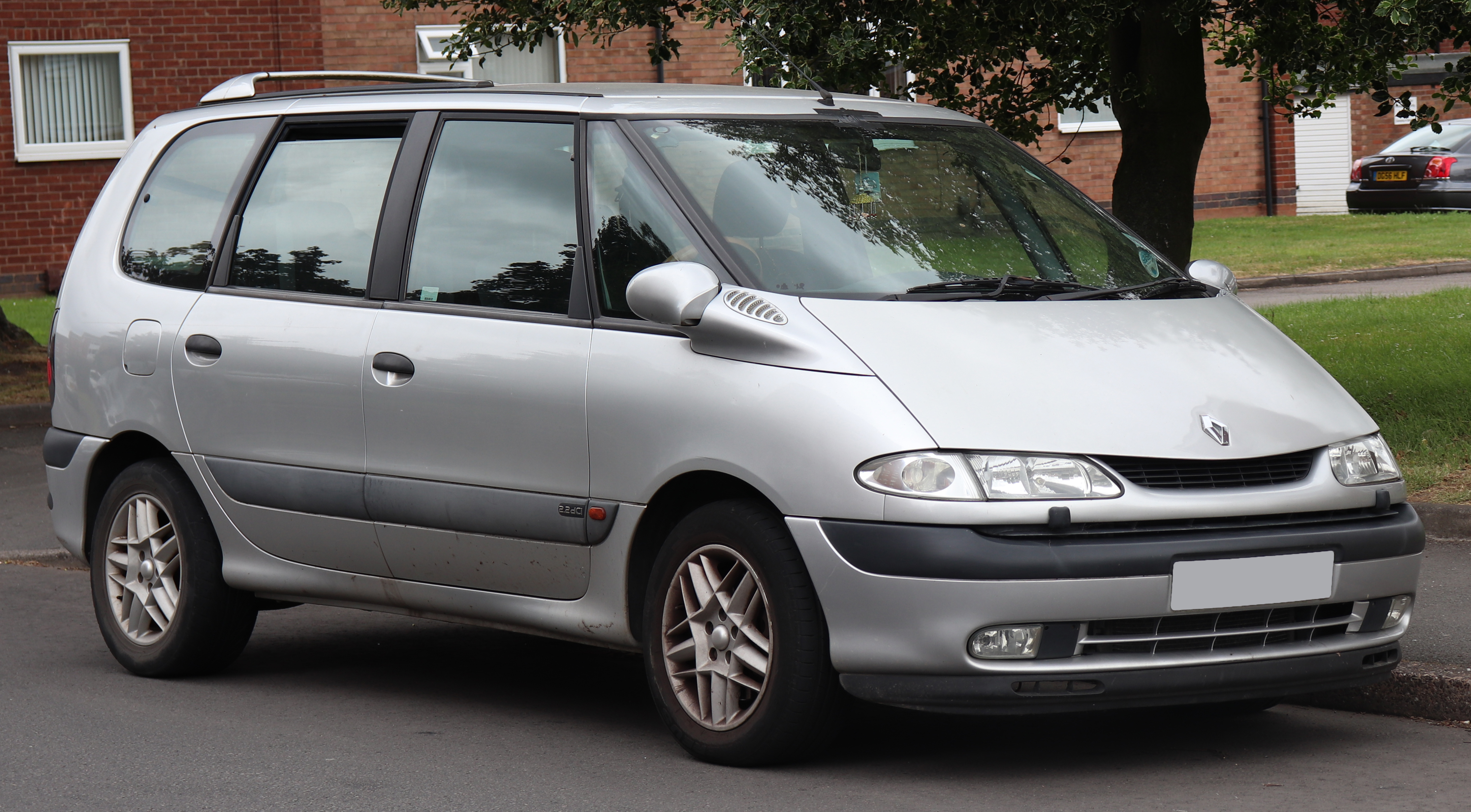

Overview
- Also called: Enviro 2000 (Malaysia)
- Production: 1996–2002
- Assembly: France: Romorantin (Matra); China: Xiaogan (SRAC)

Body and chassis
- Related: Renault Avantime

Powertrain
- Engine: Petrol: 2.0 L F3R I4; 2.0 L F4R-701 16V I4; 3.0 L PRV V6; 3.0 24V L7X V6; Diesel: 1.9 L F9Q dTi 8V I4; 2.2 L G dT 12V I4; 2.2 L dCi 16V I4
- Transmission: 5-speed manual 4-speed automatic

Dimensions
- Length: 4,517 mm (177.8 in); 4,787 mm (188.5 in) (Grand Espace)
- Width: 1,810 mm (71.3 in); 2,070 mm (81.5 in) (Grand Espace)
- Height: 1,690 mm (66.5 in); 1,700 mm (66.9 in) (Grand Espace)

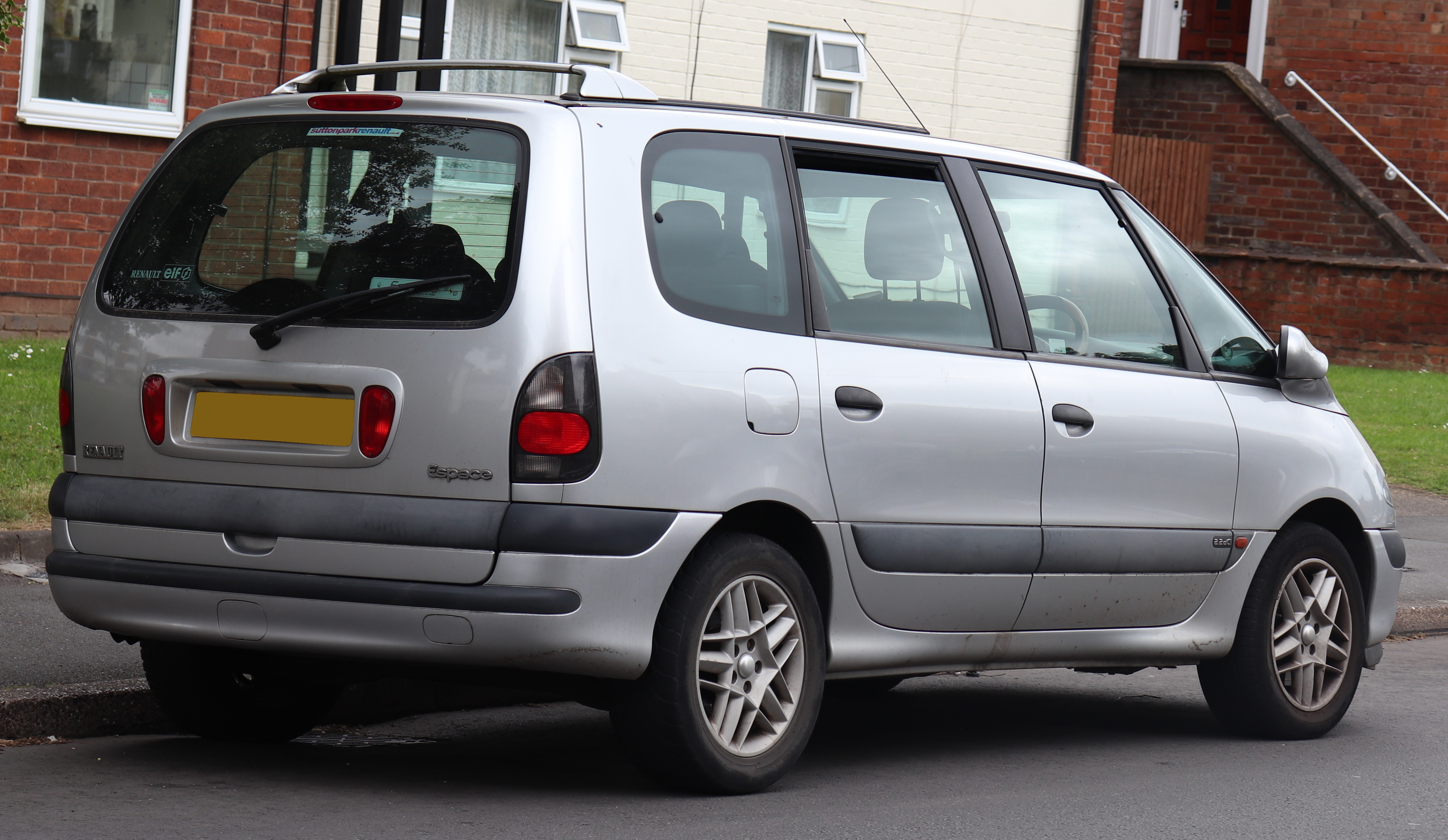
Renault Espace (short wheelbase)

The third generation Espace arrived in December 1996, with the long wheelbase Grand Espace coming to market in the beginning of 1998. The most notable feature of the Espace III was the radically futuristic interior (including an elongated and centrally mounted dashboard, digital speedometer and radio/CD display). Once again, the Espace III featured a plastic (GRP) body over a galvanised independent steel chassis. The Espace III received a facelift in September 2000.

=== Powertrain ===
In November 1999, a smaller, 1.9-litre turbodiesel had been added to the lineup. The Espace III shared much of its running gear with the Laguna of the same era. Although Renault-badged, the Espace III continued to be built by Matra.

A number of third generation Espaces were used as bases for NGV and taxi conversions for the Kuala Lumpur International Airport and the Kuala Lumpur Sentral transportation hub in Malaysia, rebranded as Enviro 2000s.

=== Gallery ===
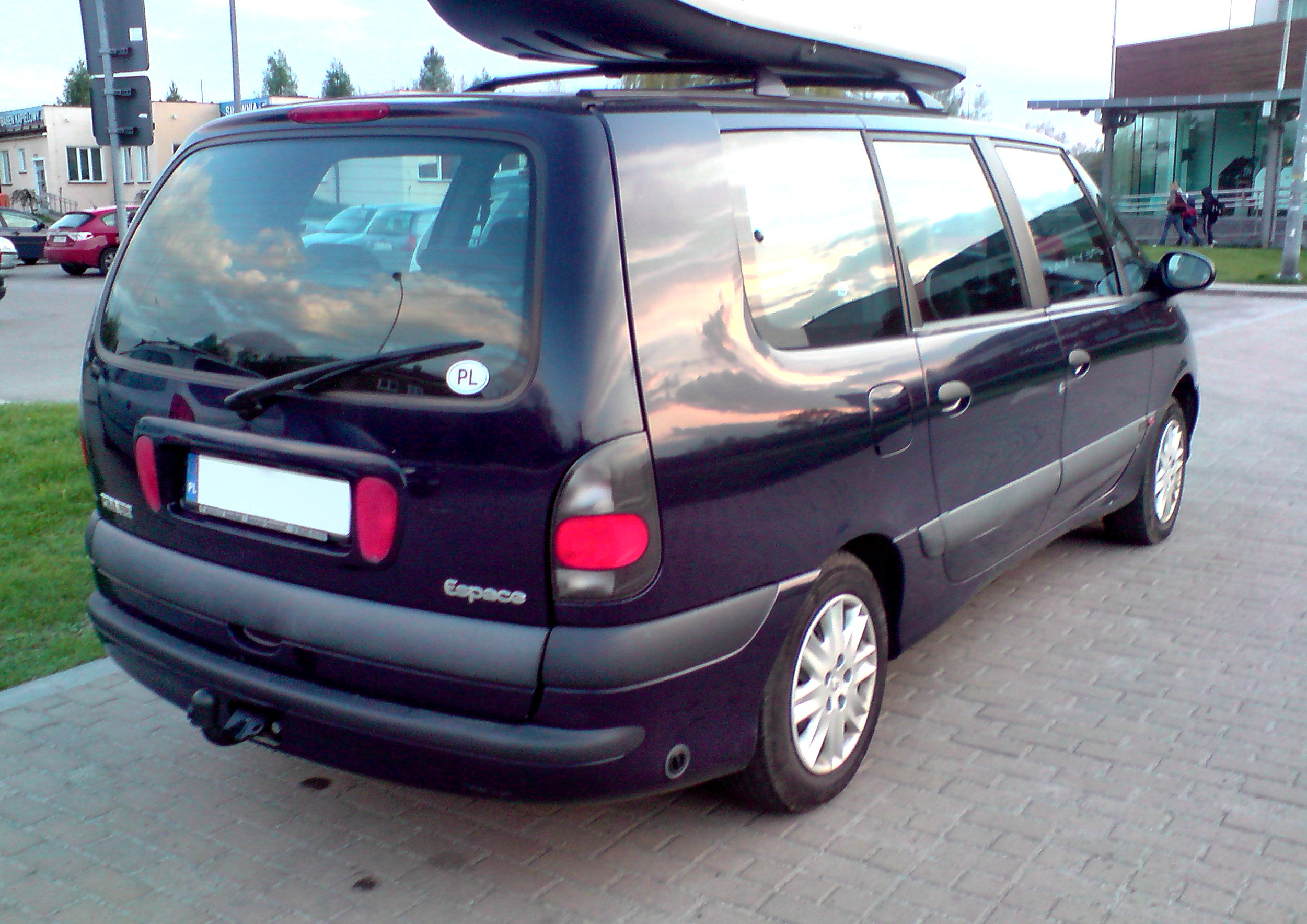
Renault Grand Espace, the long wheelbase version (1998–2002)

The third generation Espace was the last Espace to be built by Matra (the short lived Avantime was subsequently produced on the same production line). During 2001, Matra and MG Rover discussed a possible deal to build reskinned Espaces, as well as market them. However, the deal failed to happen.

Production ended in September 2002, with the final production number being 357,120.

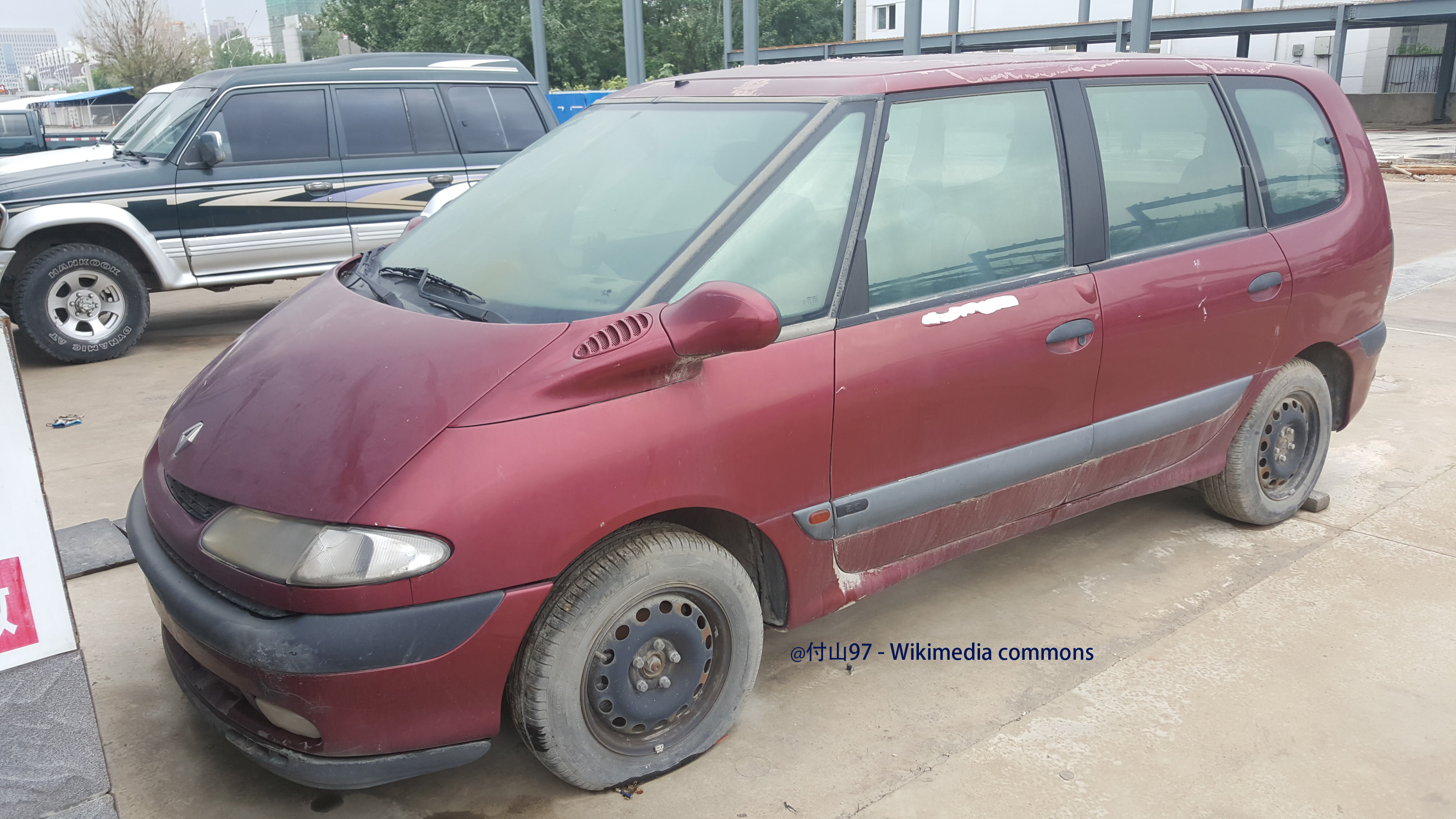
Sanjiang Espace

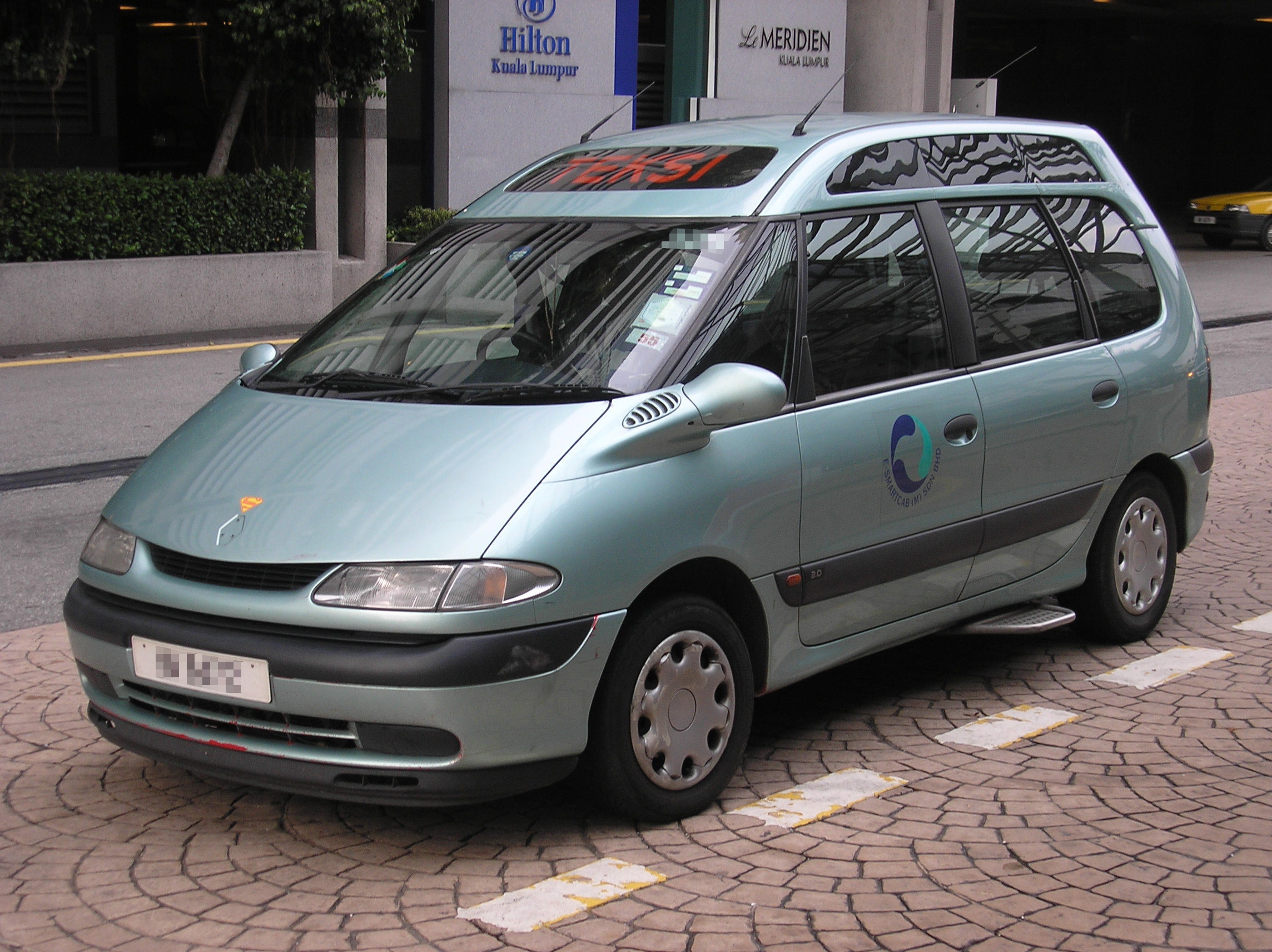
Enviro 2000 in Malaysia

== Fourth generation (J81; 2002) ==
Espace IV
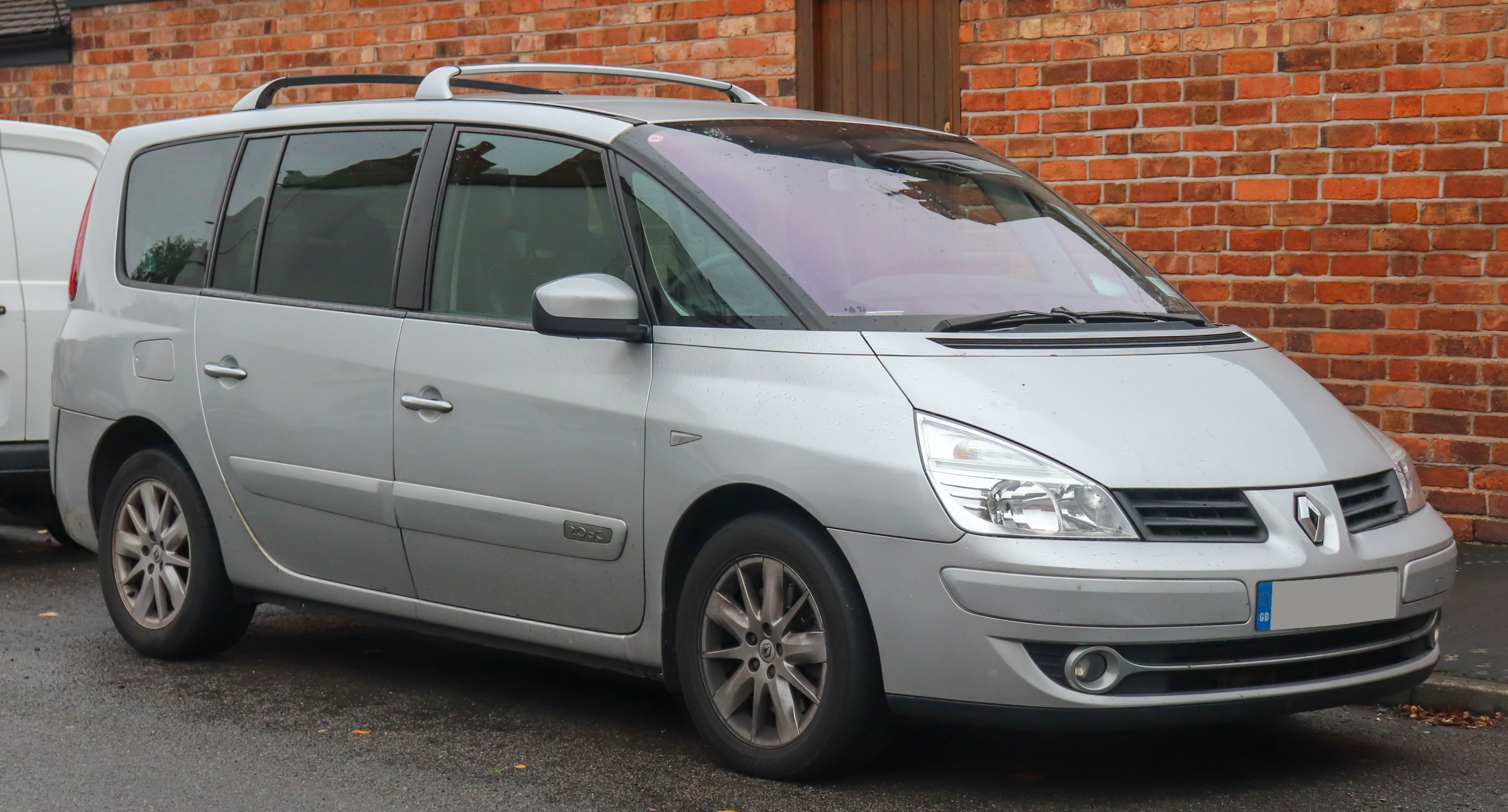

Overview
- Production: 2002–2015
- Assembly: France: Sandouville (Sandouville Factory)
- Designer: Thierry Métroz

Body and chassis
- Layout: Front-engine, front-wheel drive
- Platform: Renault M2

Powertrain
- Engine: Petrol: 2.0 L F4R I4; 2.0 L F4R turbo I4; 3.5 L V4Y V6; Diesel: 1.9 L F9Q dCi I4; 2.0 L M9R dCi I4<; 2.2 L G9T dCi I4; 3.0 L P9X V6
- Transmission: 6-speed manual 5-speed automatic 6-speed automatic

Dimensions
- Wheelbase: 2,803 mm (110.4 in) (Espace); 2,868 mm (112.9 in) (Grand Espace)
- Length: 4,661 mm (183.5 in) (Espace); 4,859 mm (191.3 in) (Grand Espace)
- Width: 1,859 mm (73.2 in)
- Height: 1,730 mm (68.1 in) (Espace); 1,750 mm (68.9 in) (Grand Espace)

The fourth generation Espace arrived in November 2002, being the first entirely Renault developed and produced model. This model is 90 percent recyclable, and contains numerous weight reducing materials, thus cutting fuel consumption. The aluminium doors and bonnet are 20 kg (44 lb) lighter than steel equivalents. Still driving the front wheels, the engines were now mounted transversely.

Its styling was reflective of a new design direction at Renault, symbolised by the radical Vel Satis and Avantime models, marking a major departure from the previous model. The fourth generation also saw the range moved upmarket.

In 2006, the Espace received a thorough facelift (Phase II) and added new 2.0 litre and 3.0 litre dCi engines. In October 2010, a slight redesign was unveiled at the Paris Motor Show (Phase III), with minor cosmetic changes, LED lights and improved equipment.

In 2002, Renault's goal was to deliver 450,000 units of the Espace IV before 2009, which would account for 20 percent of the European MPV market. The fourth generation Espace came third from the bottom in the Top Gear Satisfaction Survey 2005.

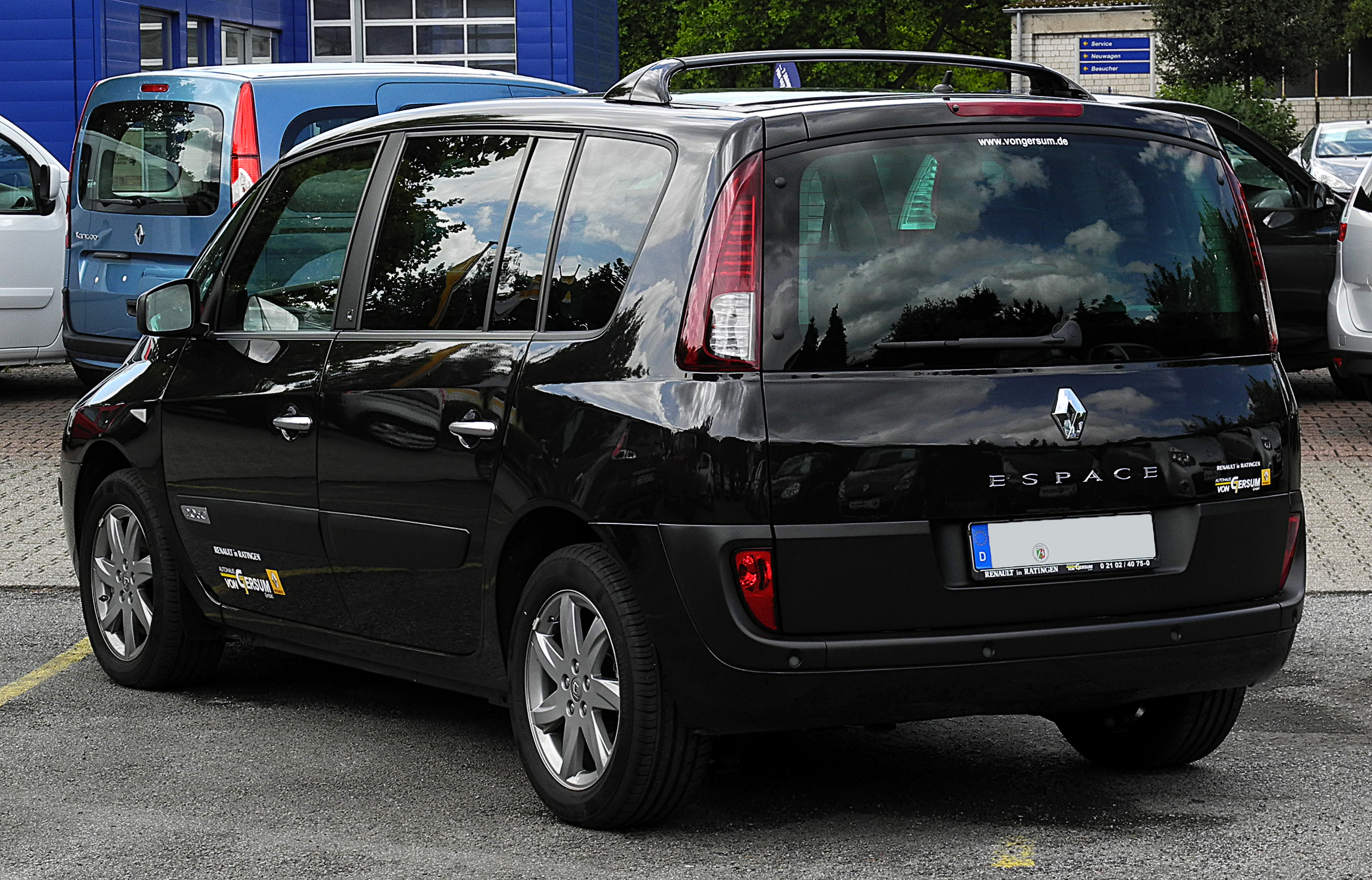
Renault Espace (facelift)

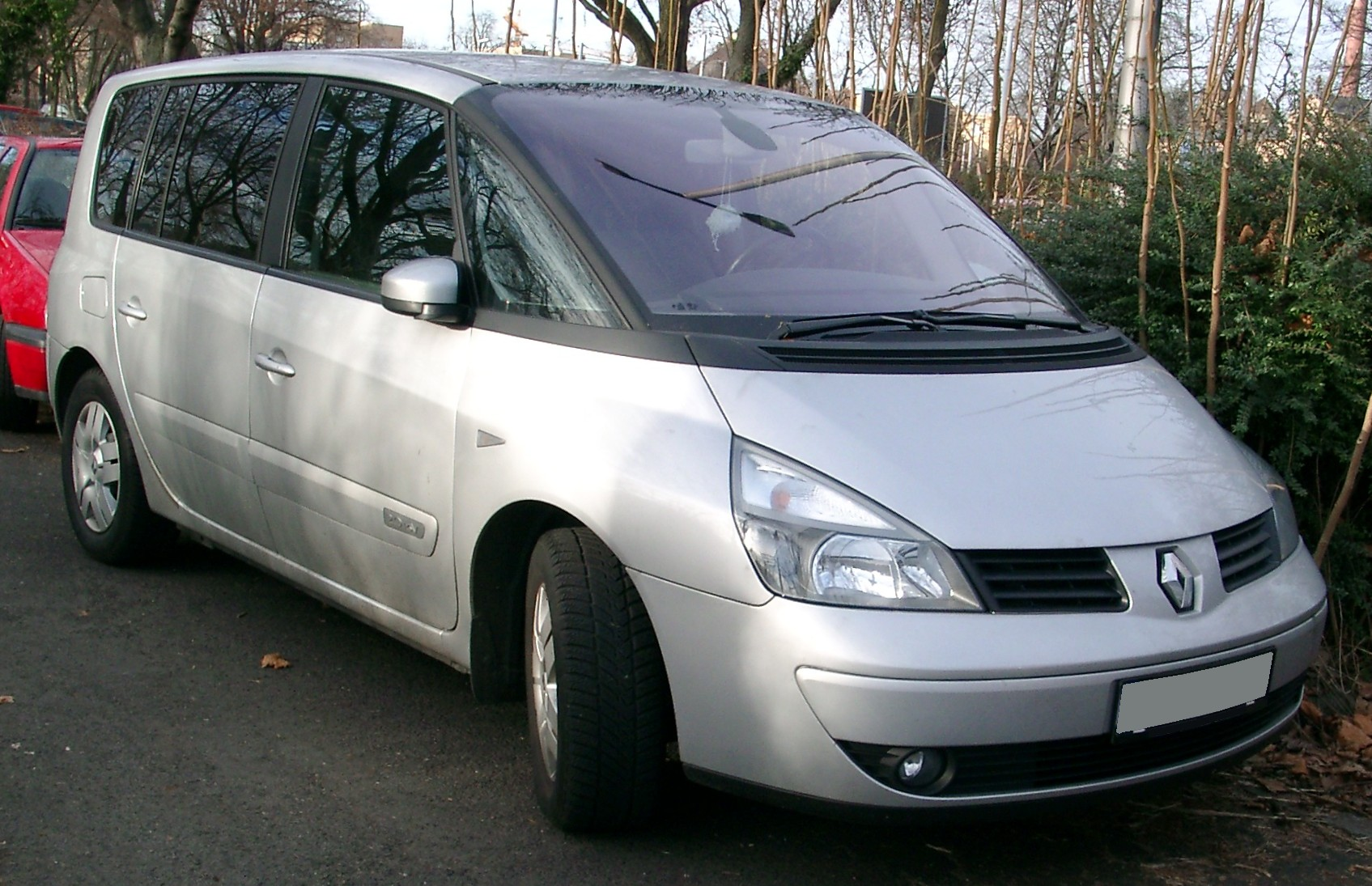
Renault Espace (pre-facelift)

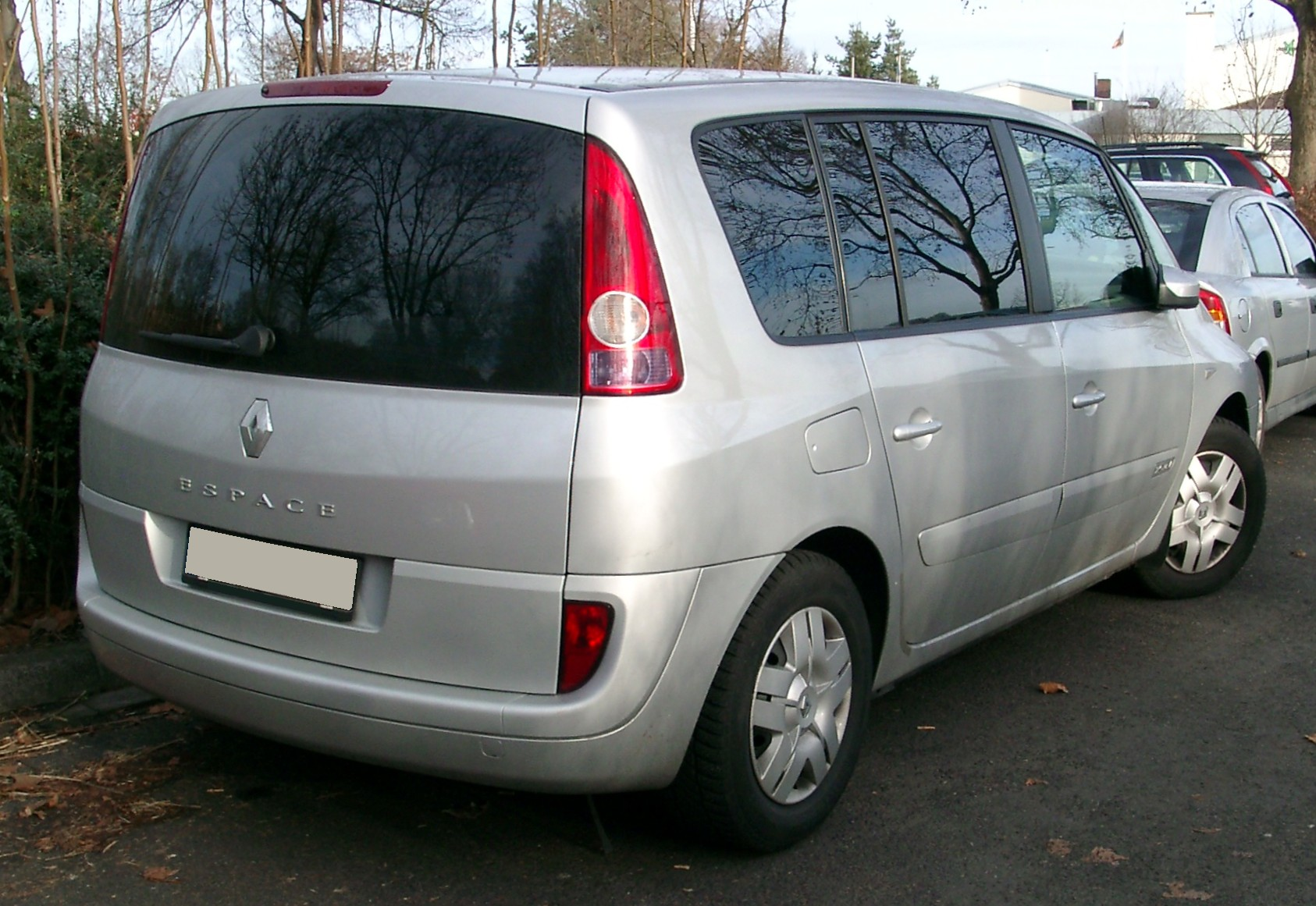
Renault Espace (pre-facelift)

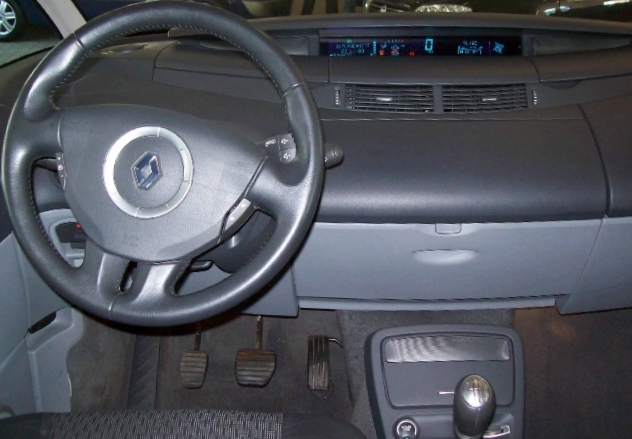
Interior

=== Phase 4 ===
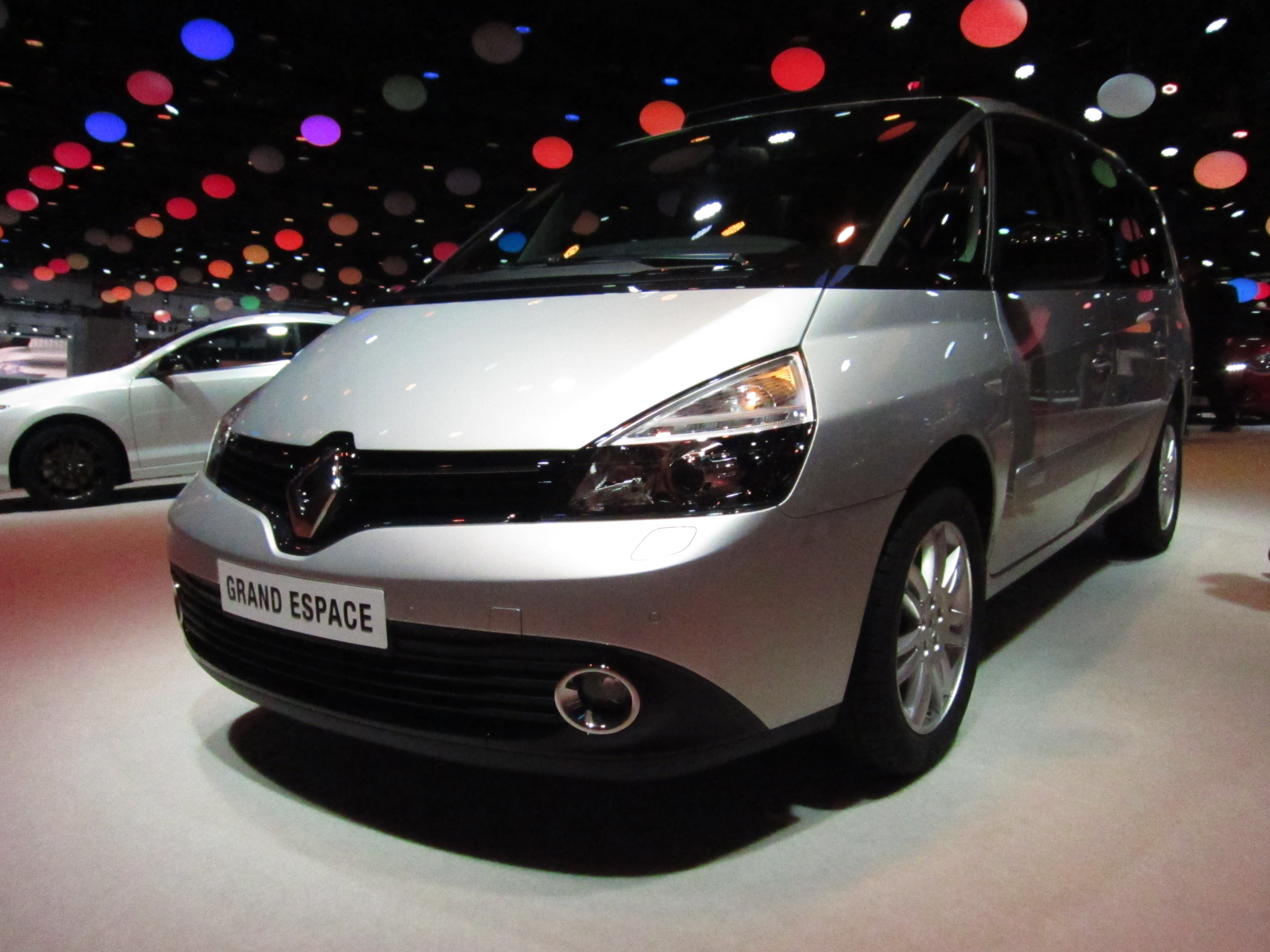
2012 facelift Renault Espace

On 22 June 2012, Renault announced a restyling of the Espace (Phase IV), the second important after 2006, incorporating the "family feeling" design concept of Laurens van den Acker. Also, it introduced new 2.0 dCi (M9R) engines, in order to meet the French regulations regarding the limitations on CO_{2} emissions. The car continued in production until the launch of a new generation.

=== Safety ===
The Espace IV passed the Euro NCAP car safety tests with following ratings:

Adult Occupant:	5/5 stars
Pedestrian:	2/4 stars

The 2003 Espace featured in British motoring television show Fifth Gear twice, once when it was crashed into a J63 Espace, and again when it was crashed into a 1990s Land Rover Discovery, both at 64 km/h (40 mph). The passenger compartment in the Espace was kept fairly intact both times, but the dummies in the older Espace and the Discovery were smashed between the seats and the dashboard, leaving no survival possibilities.

=== Reviews ===
The Renault Espace IV has received decent to good reviews from motoring journalists and is often cited as one of the best vehicles in the large MPV class.

- The AA
  'The [Espace] is the MPV to beat all MPVs; it's spacious, luxurious and drives well for a car this size. And there's no question of it being mistaken for anything else on the road.'
- Autocar
  'The interior is well executed, but even the Grand Espace isn't that spacious with seven on board. Build quality is impressive, as are the diesels, but avoid petrol power.'
- Auto Express
  'The restyle hasn't dented the visual appeal of the Espace. Yet although the interior is more practical, it's simply not as versatile as the cabins of rivals such as the new Ford Galaxy, or upmarket competitors like Land Rover's Discovery.'
- Car
  For: Gigantic
  Against: A bit unwieldy
- Parker's
  Pros: Masses of cabin room, superb long distance cruiser, strong dCi engines
  Cons: Can be expensive to buy, seats don't fold flat, sheer size makes it tricky to manoeuvre
- Top Gear
  'The last word in MPVs, the Renault Espace is simply vast, but manages to be stylish and unconventional at the same time. Available in regulation and Behemoth 'Grand' guises, either is the ultimate solution for those with a distrust of birth control.'
- What Car?
  'Decent space for people, if not their luggage. The Espace offers a refined drive and some refined engines, but some rivals are cheaper and more versatile.'

== Fifth generation (JFC; 2015) ==
Espace V
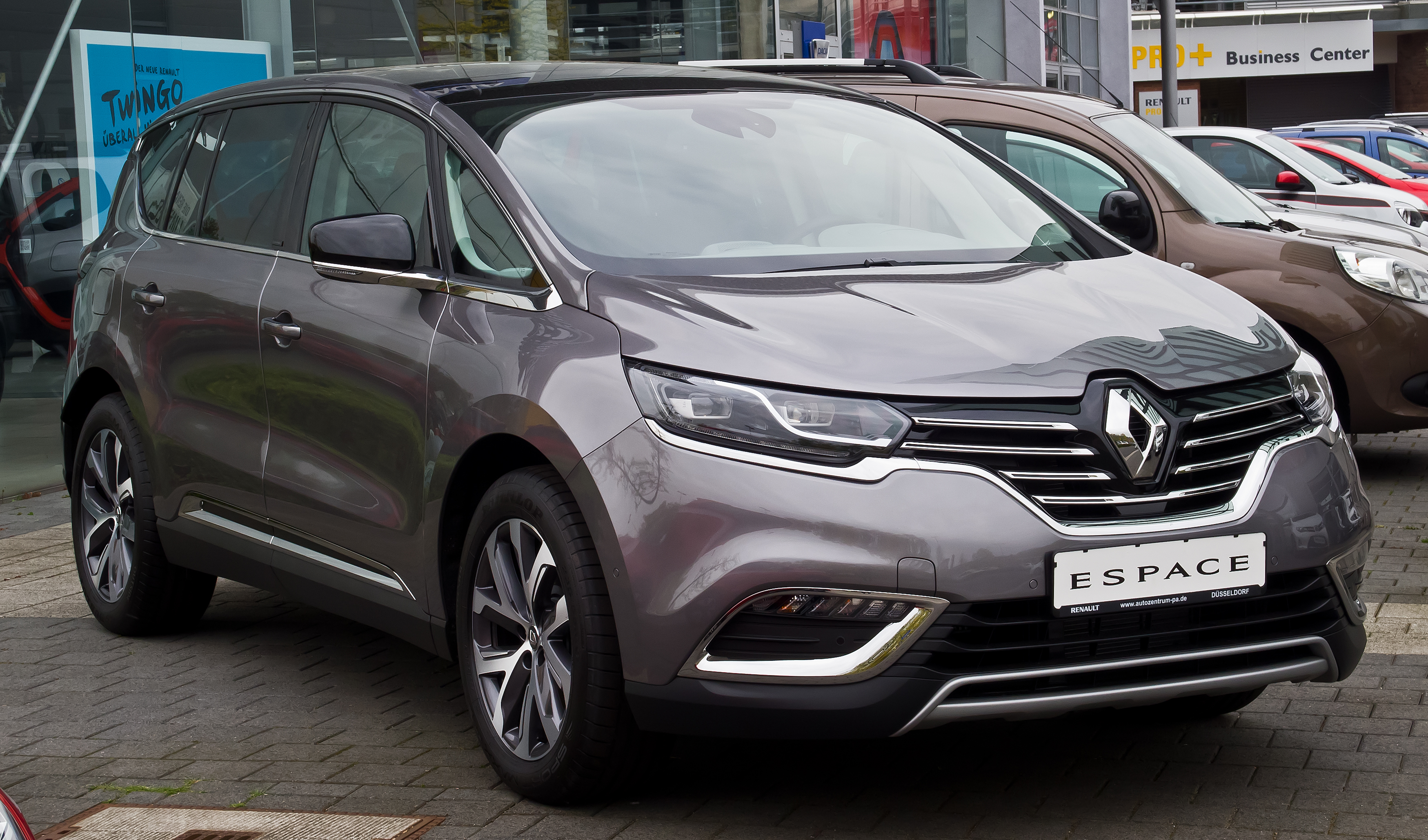

Overview
- Production: 2015–2023
- Assembly: France: Douai (Douai Renault Factory)

Body and chassis
- Layout: Front-engine, front-wheel-drive
- Platform: Renault CMF platform (CMF-CD)

Powertrain
- Engine: Petrol: 1.6 L M5M turbo I4; 1.8 L M5Pt turbo I4; Diesel: 1.6 L R9M 130 turbo I4; 1.6 L R9M 160 twin-turbo I4; 2.0 L M9R turbo I4
- Transmission: 6-speed manual; 6-speed 6DCT450/451 automatic Getrag; 7-speed 7DCT300 automatic Getrag

Dimensions
- Wheelbase: 2,884 mm (113.5 in)
- Length: 4,878 mm (192.0 in)
- Width: 1,888 mm (74.3 in)
- Height: 1,675 mm (65.9 in)

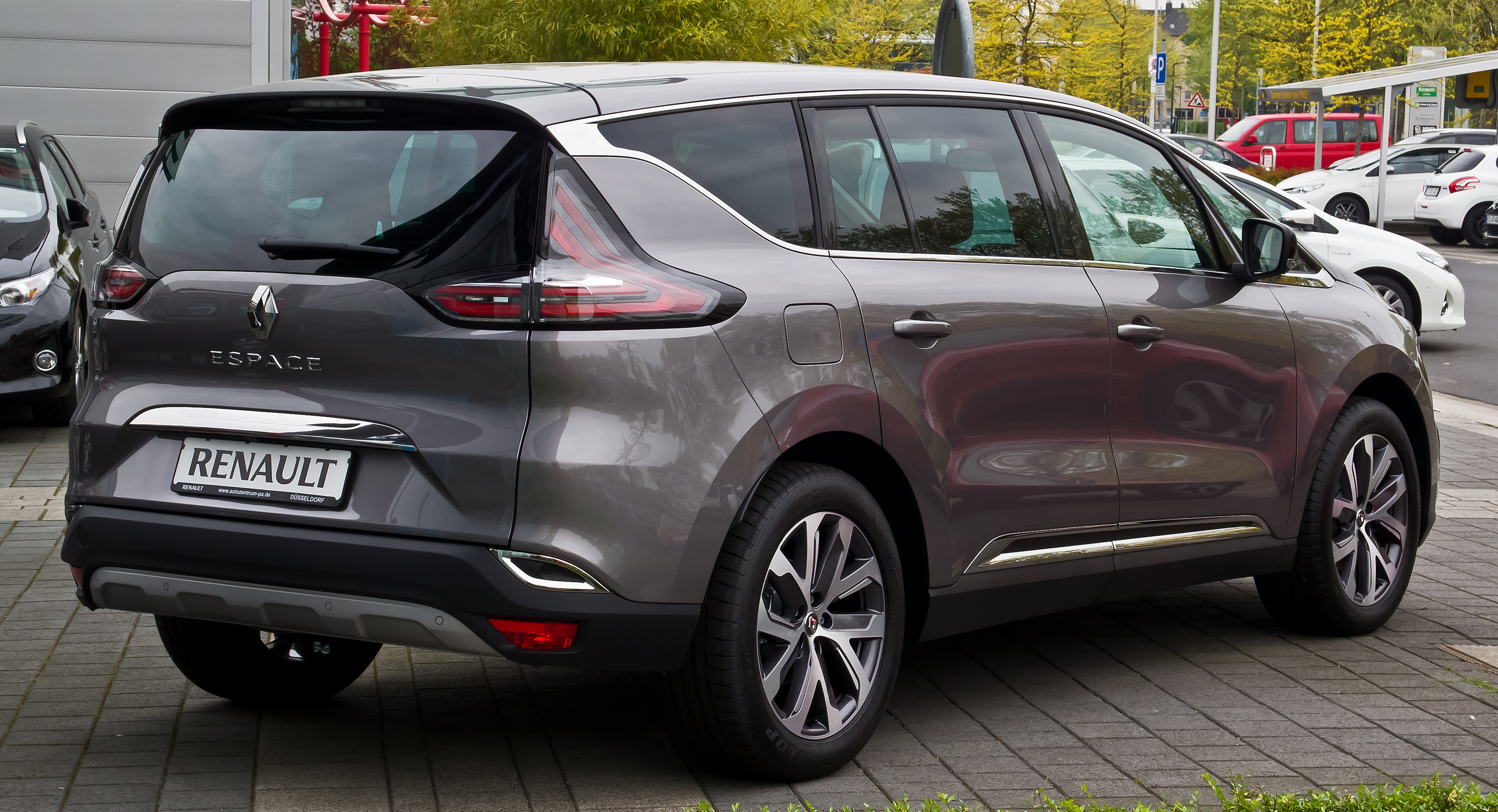
Rear view (pre-facelift)

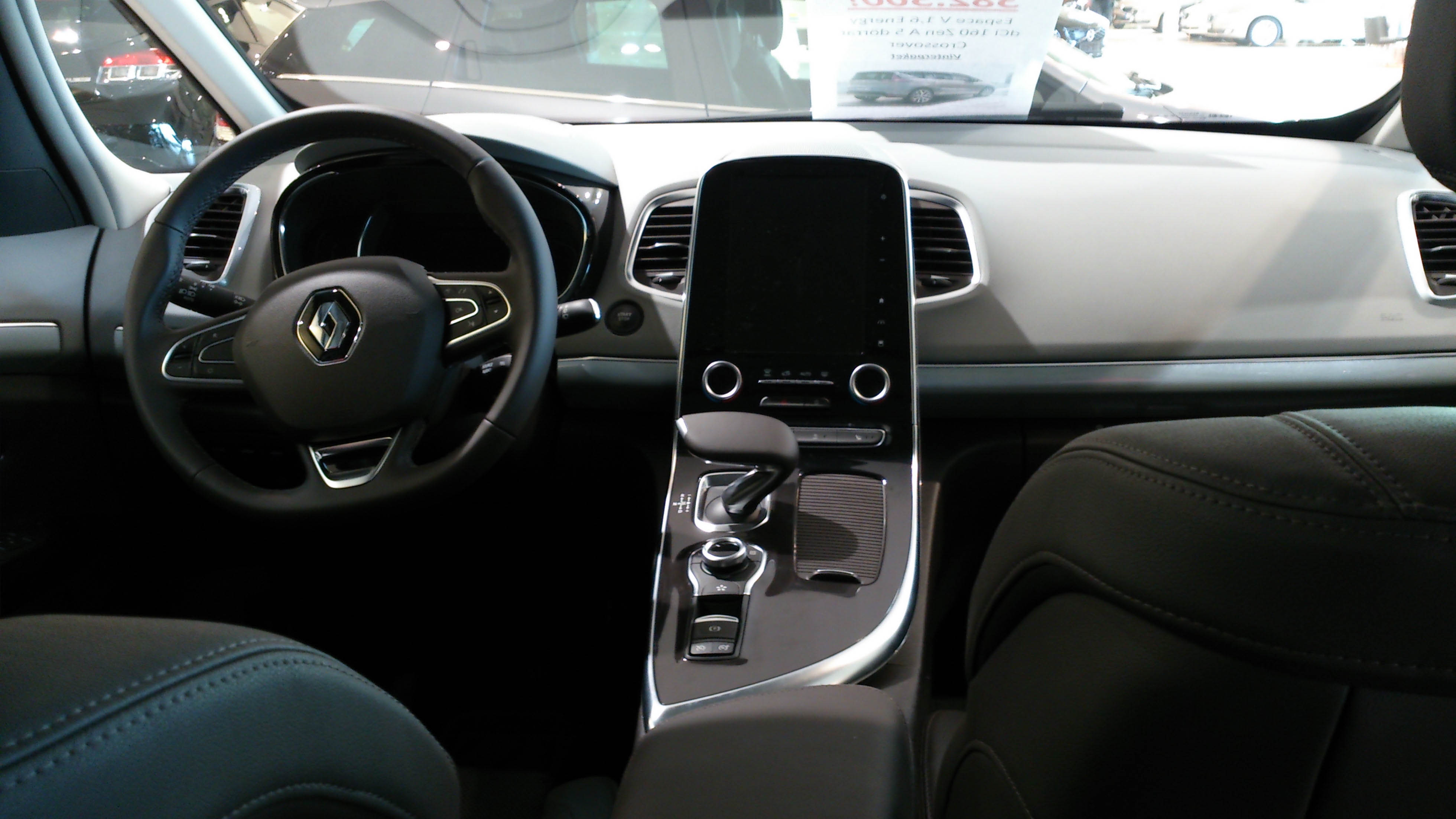
Interior (pre-facelift)

The fifth-generation Espace was unveiled at the 2014 Paris Motor Show in October 2014. The car is based on the Renault–Nissan Common Module Family architecture developed by both Renault and Nissan.

The Renault Espace has radar adaptive cruise control as an option, and active emergency braking.

It is offered with the latest version of Renault's R Link 2 information system (voice control, navigation, Bluetooth and radio), engine stop start, emergency brake assist, lane departure warning and road sign recognition with speed limit alerts, 360 degree sensors, reversing camera and a hands free parking system.

The Espace V is only available in markets with LHD, with RHD vehicles not built nor sold, as with the Renault Talisman.

In June 2017, the 1.6-liter petrol engine was replaced by the larger 1.8 TCe. In September 2018, both of the 1.6-liter R-type diesel engines were replaced by larger, more powerful 2.0-liter engines from Nissan's MR engine family.

An updated Renault Espace was commercialized from Summer 2020. This update comprises a new interior, additions to assisted driving options, an updated EasyLink infotainment system and a new dashboard. The petrol-engined models were taken out of production in October 2020, leaving only two-liter diesels. The lower powered diesel was discontinued in January 2022 and from then on the Espace was only offered with the Blue dCi 190 EDC engine with 189 PS (139 kW).

Vehicle production of this model was halted in March 2023.

=== Engine specifications ===
Petrol engines
Model	Year(s)	Displacement	Fuel type	Power	Torque	0–100 km/h (0–62 mph)	CO_{2} Emissions
TCe 200 EDC7	03/2015–06/2017	1,618 cc (98.7 cu in)	Petrol	200 PS (147 kW; 197 bhp)	260 N⋅m (192 lb⋅ft)	8.5 s	140 g/km
Energy TCe 225 EDC7	07/2017–10/2020	1,798 cc (109.7 cu in)	Petrol	225 PS (165 kW; 222 bhp)	300 N⋅m (221 lb⋅ft)	7.6 s	152 g/km

Diesel engines
Model	Year(s)	Displacement	Fuel type	Power	Torque	0–100 km/h (0–62 mph)	CO_{2} Emissions
dCi 130	03/2015–08/2018	1,598 cc (97.5 cu in)	Turbodiesel	131 PS (96 kW; 129 bhp)	320 N⋅m (236 lb⋅ft)	10.8 s	119 g/km
dCi Twin Turbo 160 EDC6	03/2015–08/2018	1,598 cc (97.5 cu in)	Twin-turbo diesel	160 PS (118 kW; 158 bhp)	380 N⋅m (280 lb⋅ft)	9.7 s	123 g/km
2.0 Blue dCi 160 EDC	09/2018–01/2022	1,997 cc (121.9 cu in)	Turbodiesel	160 PS (118 kW; 158 bhp)	360 N⋅m (266 lb⋅ft)	10.5–11.0 s	147–152 g/km
2.0 Blue dCi 190 EDC	10/2020–03/2023	1,997 cc (121.9 cu in)	Turbodiesel	189 PS (139 kW; 186 bhp)	400 N⋅m (295 lb⋅ft)	10.6 s	147–152 g/km
2.0 Blue dCi 200 EDC	09/2018–10/2020	1,997 cc (121.9 cu in)	Turbodiesel	200 PS (147 kW; 197 bhp)	400 N⋅m (295 lb⋅ft)	9.1 s	148 g/km

=== Initiale Paris ===
Renault Initiale Paris
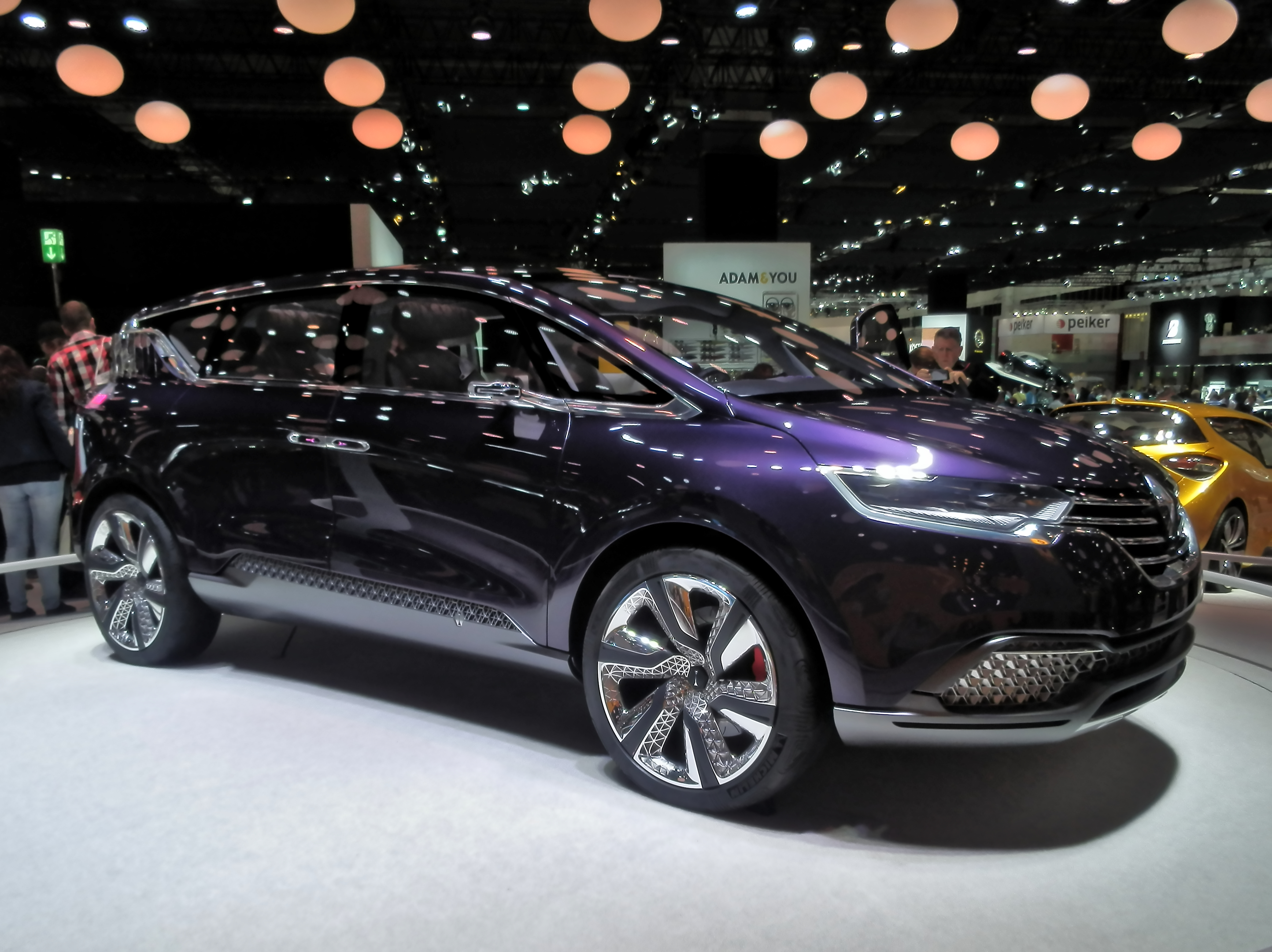
- The Renault Initiale Paris Concept

Overview
- Manufacturer: Renault
- Production: 2013

Body and chassis
- Class: Concept car
- Body style: 5-door MPV
- Layout: Front-engine, front-wheel-drive

Dimensions
- Wheelbase: 2,884 mm (113.5 in)

Chronology
- Predecessor: Renault Egeus; Renault Ondelios

The fifth-generation Espace was preceded by the Initiale Paris concept car, which is similar to the production version. The concept was unveiled in September 2013 at the Frankfurt Motor Show. It has crossover SUV styling and various luxury elements, previewing also the new Renault's Initiale Paris luxury sub-marque.

The car incorporates an aluminium–poly(methyl methacrylate) roof, which has a map of Paris.

The engine is a 1.6 litre diesel unit. The Initiale Paris is the final installment of Laurens van den Acker's "cycle of life" six-concept series, with each one representing, according to Renault, a lifetime moment: "love" (Renault DeZir), "explore" (Renault Captur), "family" (Renault R-Space), "work" (Renault Frendzy), "play" (Renaults Twin'Z and Twin'Run) and "wisdom" (Renault Initiale Paris).

== Sixth generation (2023) ==
Espace VI
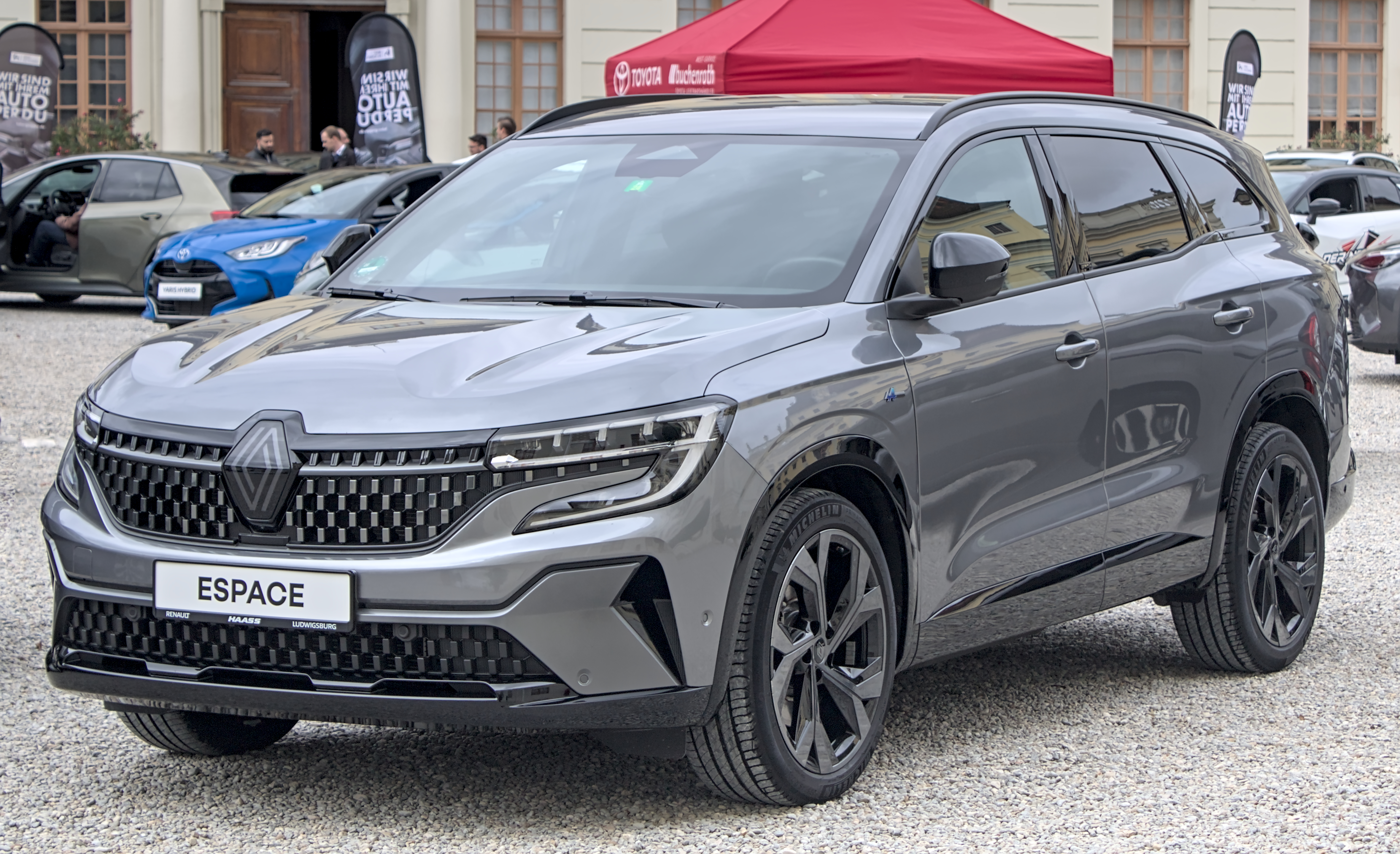
- 2024 Espace Esprit Alpine (pre-facelift)

Overview
- Production: 2023–present
- Assembly: Spain: Palencia (Renault Spain)

Body and chassis
- Platform: Renault–Nissan CMF-CD
- Related: Renault Austral; Renault Rafale

Powertrain
- Engine: Petrol hybrid: 1.2 L HR12 I3 turbo full hybrid; 1.3 L H5Ht I4 turbo mild hybrid
- Electric motor: 67 hp (68 PS; 50 kW) (E-Tech Hybrid)
- Transmission: Multimode clutchless automatic hybrid transmission; X-Tronic CVT
- Hybrid drivetrain: Power-split
- Battery: 2.0 kWh lithium-ion

Dimensions
- Wheelbase: 2,738 mm (107.8 in)
- Length: 4,722 mm (185.9 in)
- Width: 1,843 mm (72.6 in)
- Height: 1,645 mm (64.8 in)
- Kerb weight: 1,587–1,698 kg (3,499–3,743 lb)

Chronology
- Predecessor: Renault Koleos; Renault Grand Scénic

Unveiled on 28 March 2023, the sixth-generation Espace is heavily based on the Austral, sharing most of the body panels including the front end and the interior.

This model features the OpenR Link multimedia system.

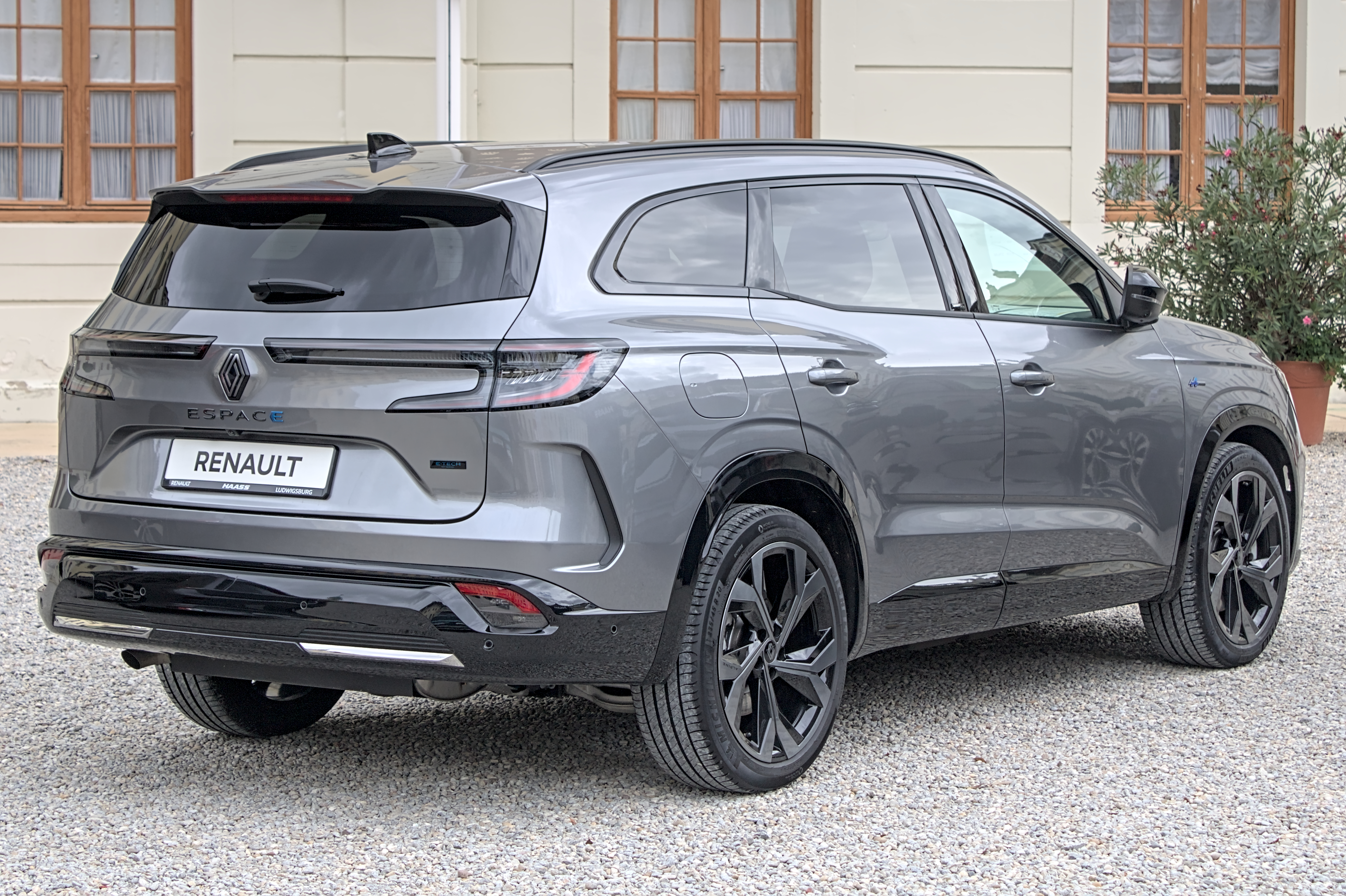
Rear view (pre-facelift)

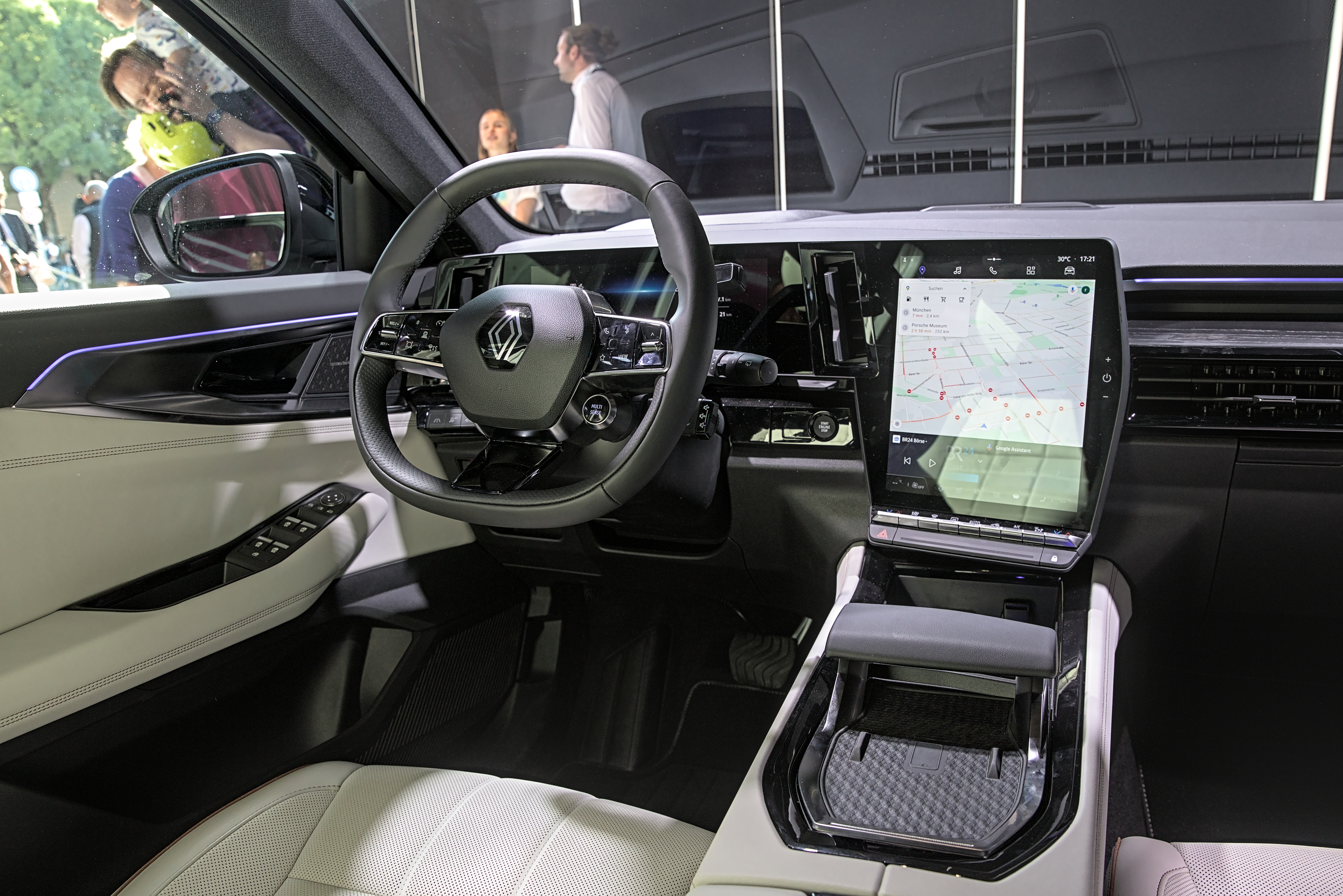
Interior (pre-facelift)

=== Facelift ===
The Espace received a facelift in March 2025. Upgrades included a new front end inspired by the Renault Rafale. It also received a new hood and tailgate as well as new rear lights. New seats were added into the interior as well as extra soundproofing.

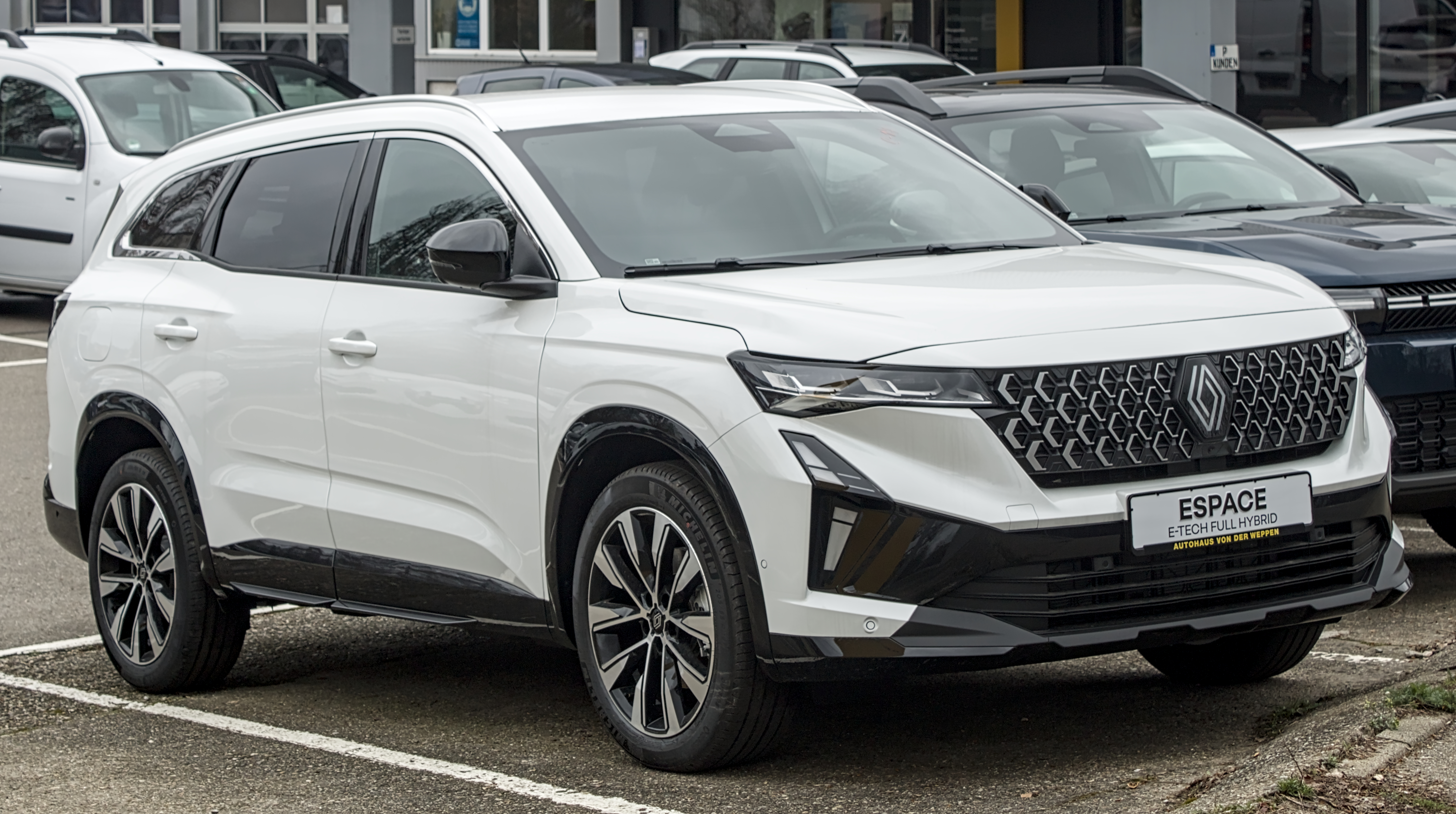
Facelift Espace (front)

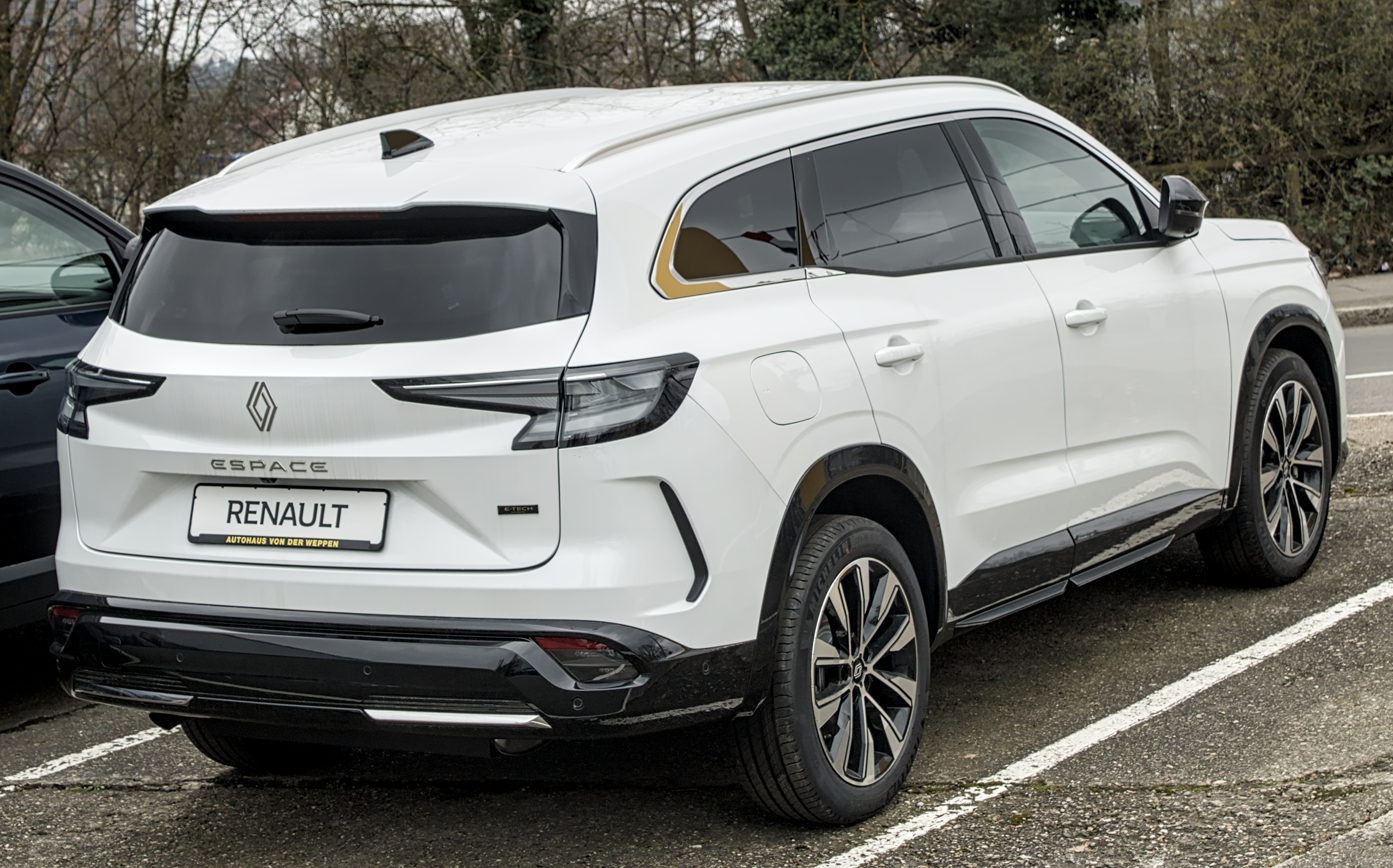
Facelift Espace (rear)

== See also ==
- Renault Modus, the mini MPV of the manufacturer
- Renault Scénic, the compact MPV of the manufacturer
- Renault Avantime
