= Renault Laguna =

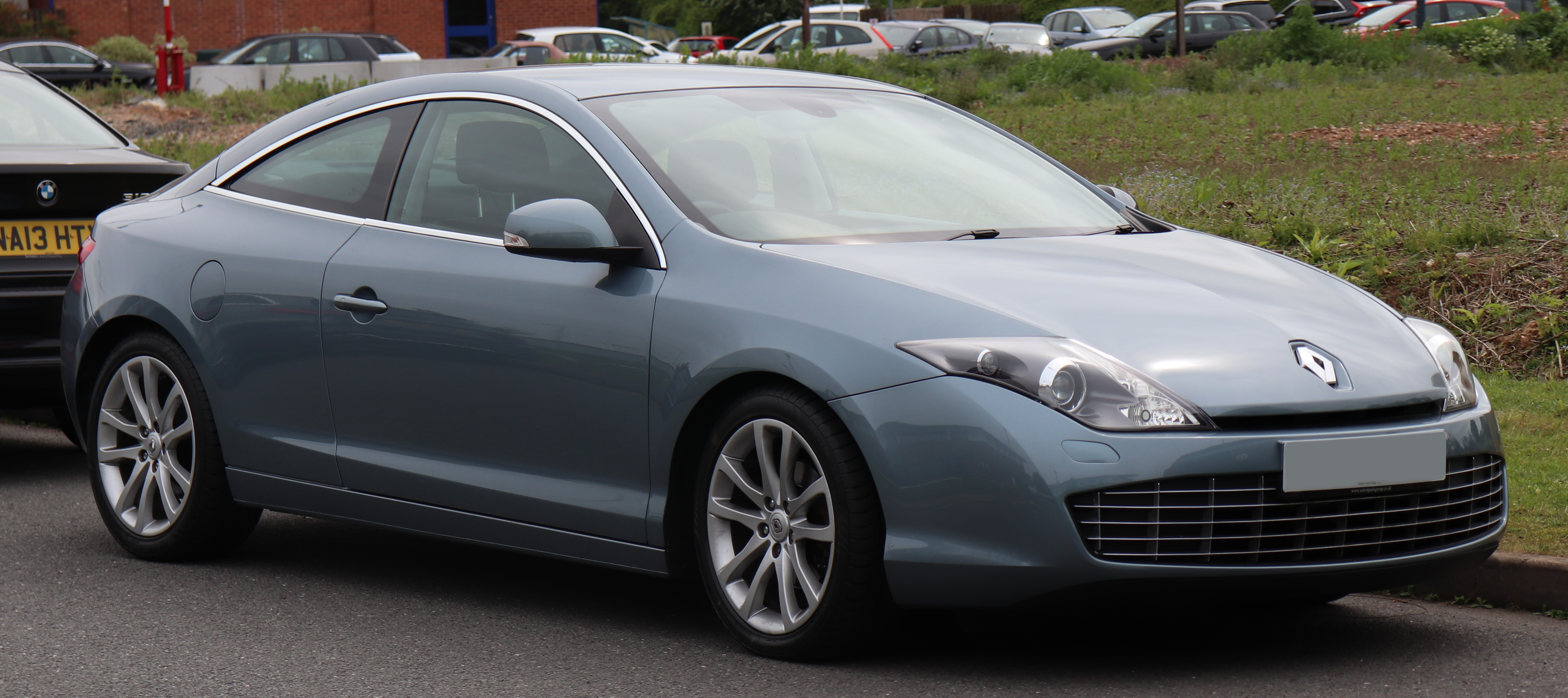

Overview
- Manufacturer: Renault
- Production: January 1994 – March 2015 (LHD); January 1994 – February 2012 (RHD) (except Australia)

Body and chassis
- Class: Large family car (D); Coupe
- Layout: FF layout

Chronology
- Predecessor: Renault 21
- Successor: Renault Latitude (Australia); Renault Talisman

The Renault Laguna is a large family car that was manufactured and marketed by Renault for 21 years in three body styles: hatchback, coupé, and estate. The first generation Laguna was launched in 1994, the second generation was introduced in 2000, and the third generation was built from October 2007 until 2015.

== Concept car ==
The production Renault passenger models are unrelated to the concept car of the same name, the Laguna, a two-seater roadster presented by the automaker during the 1990 Paris Motor Show. The name was also previously used from 1973 to 1976 by Chevrolet, for a top-of-the-line Chevelle model, the Chevrolet Chevelle Laguna.

== First generation (X56; 1994) ==
First generation (X56)
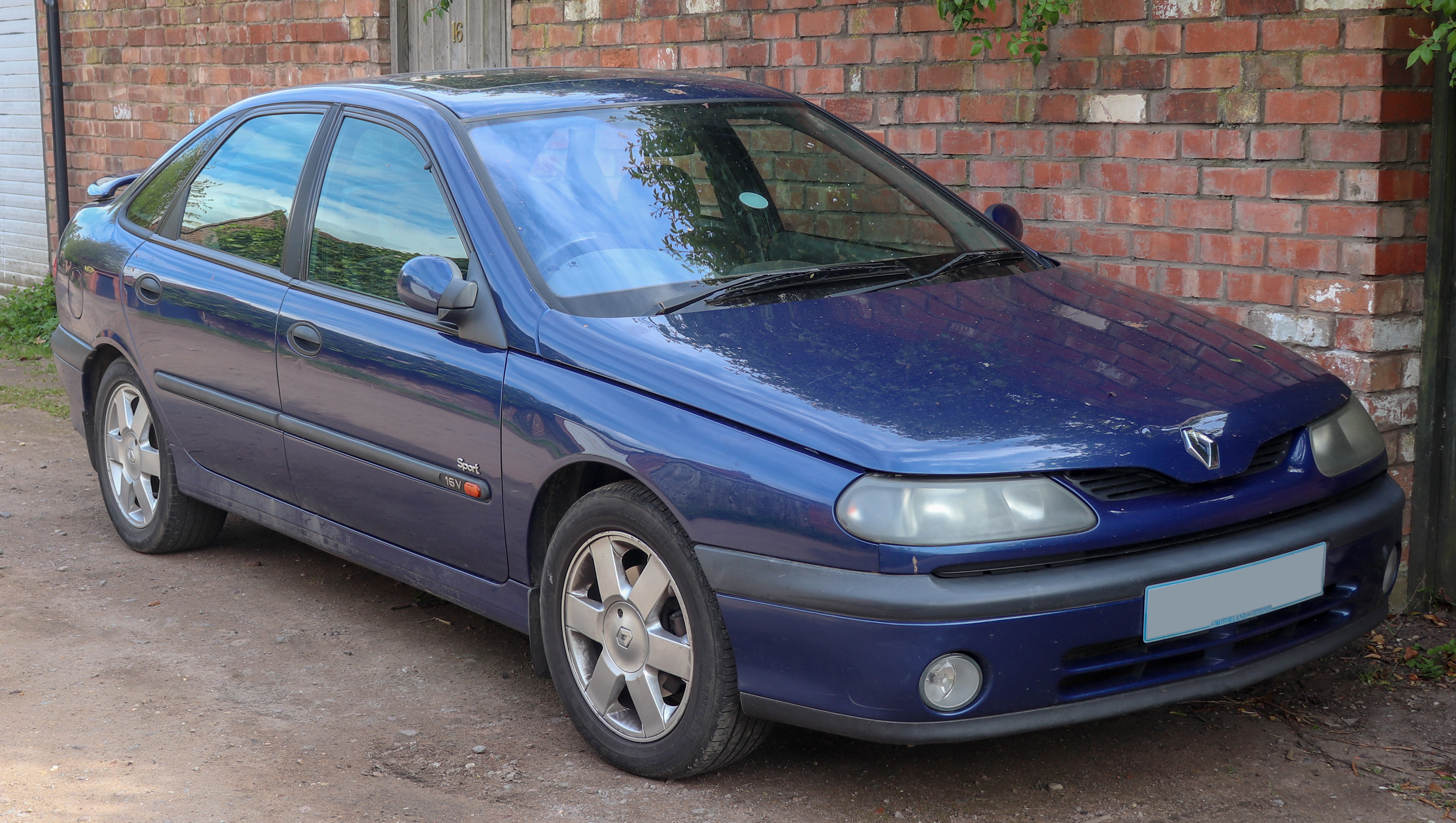

Overview
- Production: January 1994 – December 2000
- Assembly: France: Sandouville (Sandouville Renault Factory)
- Designer: Patrick Le Quément (1989)

Body and chassis
- Body style: 5-door hatchback 5-door estate

Powertrain
- Engine: Petrol: 1.6 L K4M 16v I4; 1.8 L F3P I4; 1.8 L F4P 16v I4; 1.9 L N7Q 16v I4; 2.0 L F3R I4; 2.0 L F4R 16v I4; 3.0 L Z7X V6; 3.0 L L7X 24v V6; Diesel: 1.9 L F9Q dTi/dCi turbo I4; 2.2 L G8T 12v I4; 2.2 L G8T 12v turbo I4
- Transmission: 5-speed manual 4-speed automatic (BVA)

Dimensions
- Length: 4,508 mm (177.5 in)
- Width: 1,752 mm (69.0 in)
- Height: 1,433 mm (56.4 in)
- Curb weight: 1,230 kg (2,710 lb) (1.6 hatchback)

With development underway from 1987, design work under Patrick Le Quément began in 1988, with a final design approval in March 1989, and a design freeze by the beginning of 1990. Road testing commenced in 1991 and continued through 1993. The first generation Renault Laguna was unveiled in November 1993 and launched in January 1994. It was the replacement for the Renault 21, although it was initially only available as a hatchback.

At the Frankfurt Motor Show in September 1995, an estate version was introduced. This was known in some markets as the Laguna Sports Tourer, and replaced the Renault 21 Nevada/Savanna. It was initially launched as a 1.8 RN/RT, 2.0 RT/RXE, and 3.0 V6. A sports pack with deep front spoiler, rear spoiler, and alloy wheels was available on 2.0 versions.

A limited-edition of 500 1.8 RT Sport was made available in 1996, one hundred each of five colours including a metallic blue normally reserved for 2.0 models. These limited editions sold out very quickly and so the RT Sport was incorporated into the standard range at a cheaper price but having ABS, air conditioning, CD/Radio, and high-level brake light added as standard (all these were options on the more expensive, original 500). This coincided with Renault's participation in the British Touring Car Championship.

The Laguna's equipment levels were generally much higher than the Renault 21. From launch, all models came with power steering, electric front windows, and remote central locking as standard. Most of the range had a driver's airbag. Later twin airbags, an anti-lock braking system, air conditioning, and a CD player became either optional extras or standard equipment.

In September 1996, minor upgrades included a new Laguna nameplate at the rear.

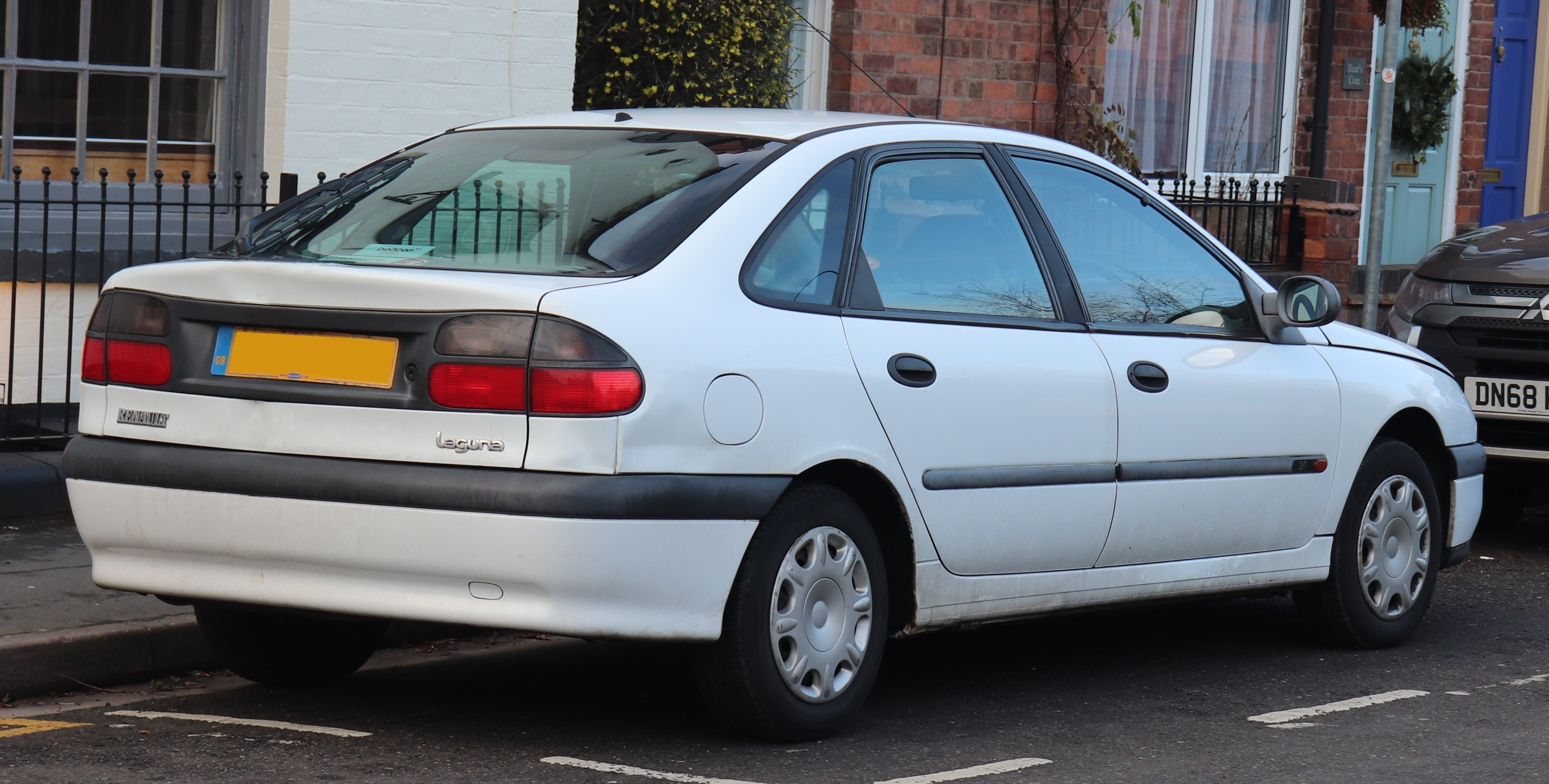
1994–1998 Renault Laguna (hatchback)

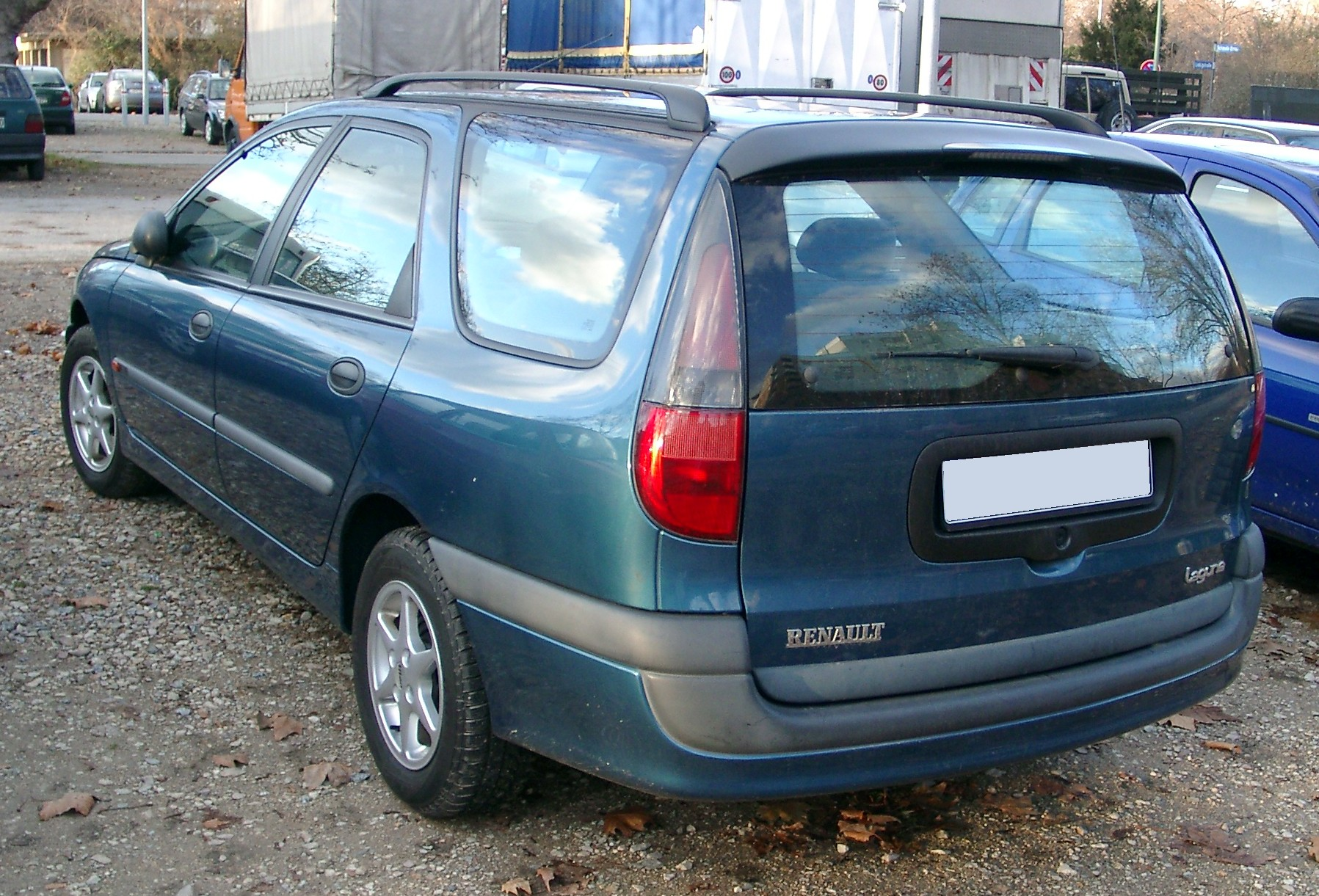
1995–1998 Renault Laguna (estate)

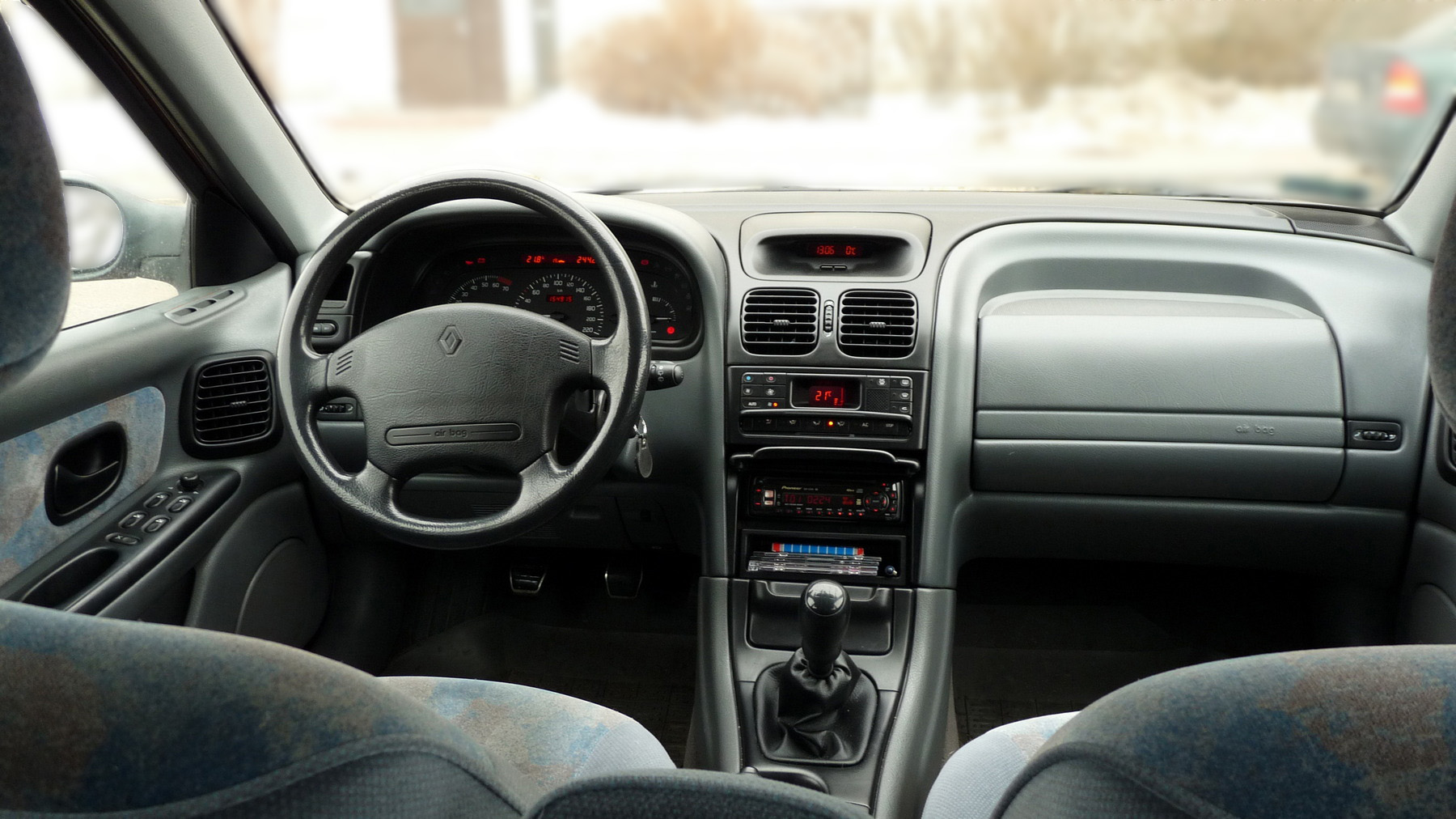
Interior

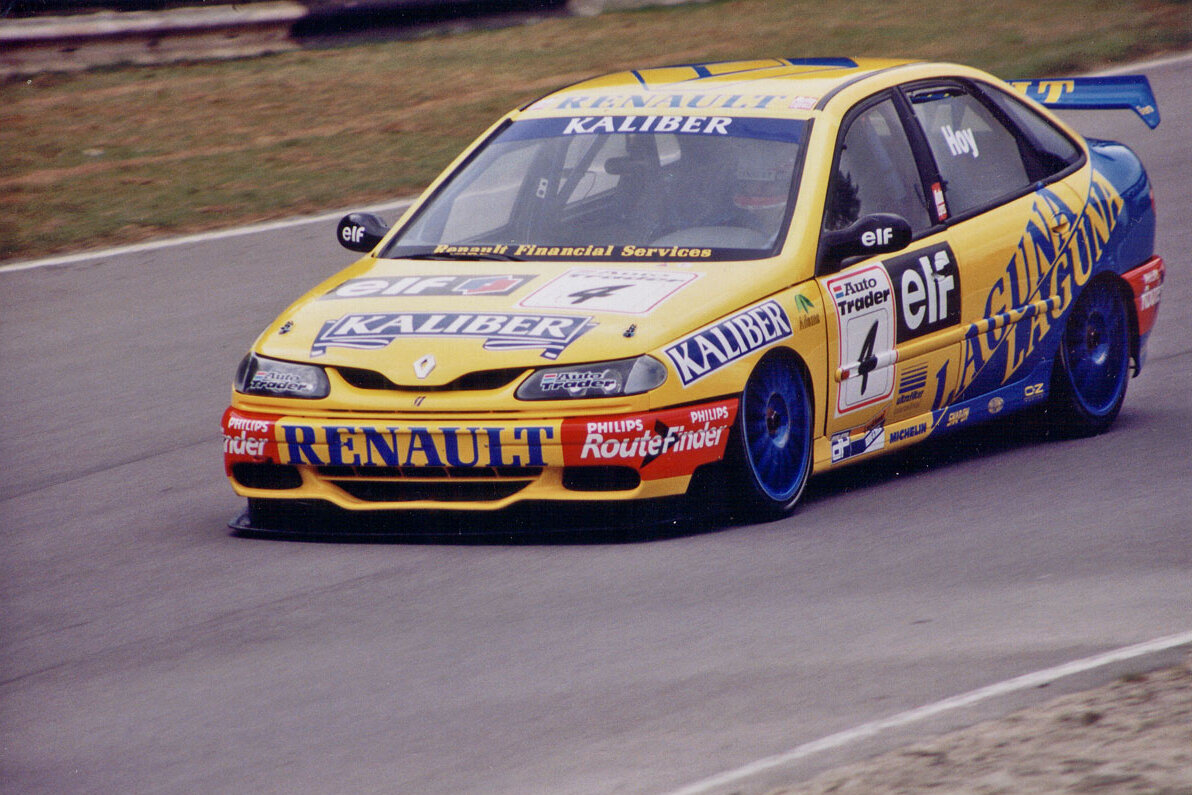
Renault Laguna built to Super Touring regulations contesting the 1996 British Touring Car Championship

=== Engines ===
| Model | Engine type | Displacement | Valvetrain | Fuel system | Max. power at rpm | Max. torque at rpm | 0–100 km/h (0–62 mph) | Top speed | Years |
|---|---|---|---|---|---|---|---|---|---|
Petrol engines
| 1.6 16v | K4M-720 | 1,598 cc | Straight-four engineI4 DOHC 16v | Multi point fuel injection | 110 PS (81 kW; 108 hp) @ 5,750 rpm | 148 N⋅m (109 lb⋅ft) @ 3,750 rpm | 11.5 s | 195 km/h (121 mph) | 1998–2001 |
| 1.8 | F3P-670 | 1,794 cc | I4 SOHC 8v | Multi point fuel injection | 90 PS (66 kW; 89 hp) @ 5,750 rpm | 144 N⋅m (106 lb⋅ft) @ 2,750 rpm | 13.9 s | 180 km/h (112 mph) | 1994–98 |
| 1.8 | F3P-678 | 1,794 cc | I4 SOHC 8v | Single point fuel injection | 95 PS (70 kW; 94 hp) @ 5,750 rpm | 145 N⋅m (107 lb⋅ft) @ 2,750 rpm | 13.9 s | 180 km/h (112 mph) | 1994–98 |
| 1.8 16v | F4P-760 | 1,783 cc | I4 DOHC 16v | Multi point fuel injection | 120 PS (88 kW; 118 hp) @ 5,750 rpm | 165 N⋅m (122 lb⋅ft) @ 3,750 rpm | 10.7 s | 203 km/h (126 mph) | 1998–2001 |
| 2.0 | F3R-729 | 1,998 cc | I4 SOHC 8v | Multi point fuel injection | 114 PS (84 kW; 112 hp) @ 5,400 rpm | 168 N⋅m (124 lb⋅ft) @ 4,250 rpm | 11.6 s | 190 km/h (118 mph) | 1994–2001 |
| 2.0 S | N7Q-704 | 1,948 cc | I4 DOHC 16v | Multi point fuel injection | 140 PS (103 kW; 138 hp) @ 6,000 rpm | 182 N⋅m (134 lb⋅ft) @ 4,500 rpm | 9.9 s | 206 km/h (128 mph) | 1995–99 |
| 2.0 16v | F4R-780 | 1,998 cc | I4 DOHC 16v | Multi point fuel injection | 139 PS (102 kW; 137 hp) @ 5,750 rpm | 188 N⋅m (139 lb⋅ft) @ 3,750 rpm | 9.8 s | 208 km/h (129 mph) | 1999–2001 |
| 3.0 | Z7X | 2,963 cc | V6 SOHC 12v | Multi point fuel injection | 167 PS (123 kW; 165 hp) @ 5,500 rpm | 235 N⋅m (173 lb⋅ft) @ 4,500 rpm | 8.6 s | 220 km/h (137 mph) | 1994–97 |
| 3.0 | L7X | 2,946 cc | V6 DOHC 24v | Multi point fuel injection | 190 PS (140 kW; 187 hp) @ 5,750 rpm | 267 N⋅m (197 lb⋅ft) @ 4,000 rpm | 7.7 s | 235 km/h (146 mph) | 1997–2001 |
Diesel engines
| 1.9 dTi | F9Q-716 | 1,870 cc | I4 SOHC 8v | Direct injection | 98 PS (72 kW; 97 hp) @ 4,000 rpm | 200 N⋅m (148 lb⋅ft) @ 2,000 rpm | 12.5 s | 185 km/h (115 mph) | 1998–2001 |
| 1.9 dCi | F9Q | 1,870 cc | I4 SOHC 8v | Common rail direct injection | 107 PS (79 kW; 106 hp) @ 4,000 rpm | 250 N⋅m (184 lb⋅ft) @ 1,750 rpm | 11.8 s | 190 km/h (118 mph) | 2000–01 |
| 2.2 d | G8T-792 | 2,188 cc | I4 SOHC 12v | Indirect injection | 83 PS (61 kW; 82 hp) @ 4,500 rpm | 142 N⋅m (105 lb⋅ft) @ 2,250 rpm | 15.5 s | 175 km/h (109 mph) | 1994–98 |
| 2.2 dT | G8T | 2,188 cc | I4 SOHC 12v | Indirect injection | 113 PS (83 kW; 111 hp) @ 4,300 rpm | 250 N⋅m (184 lb⋅ft) @ 2,000 rpm | 11.8 s | 195 km/h (121 mph) | 1998–2000 |

=== Facelift ===
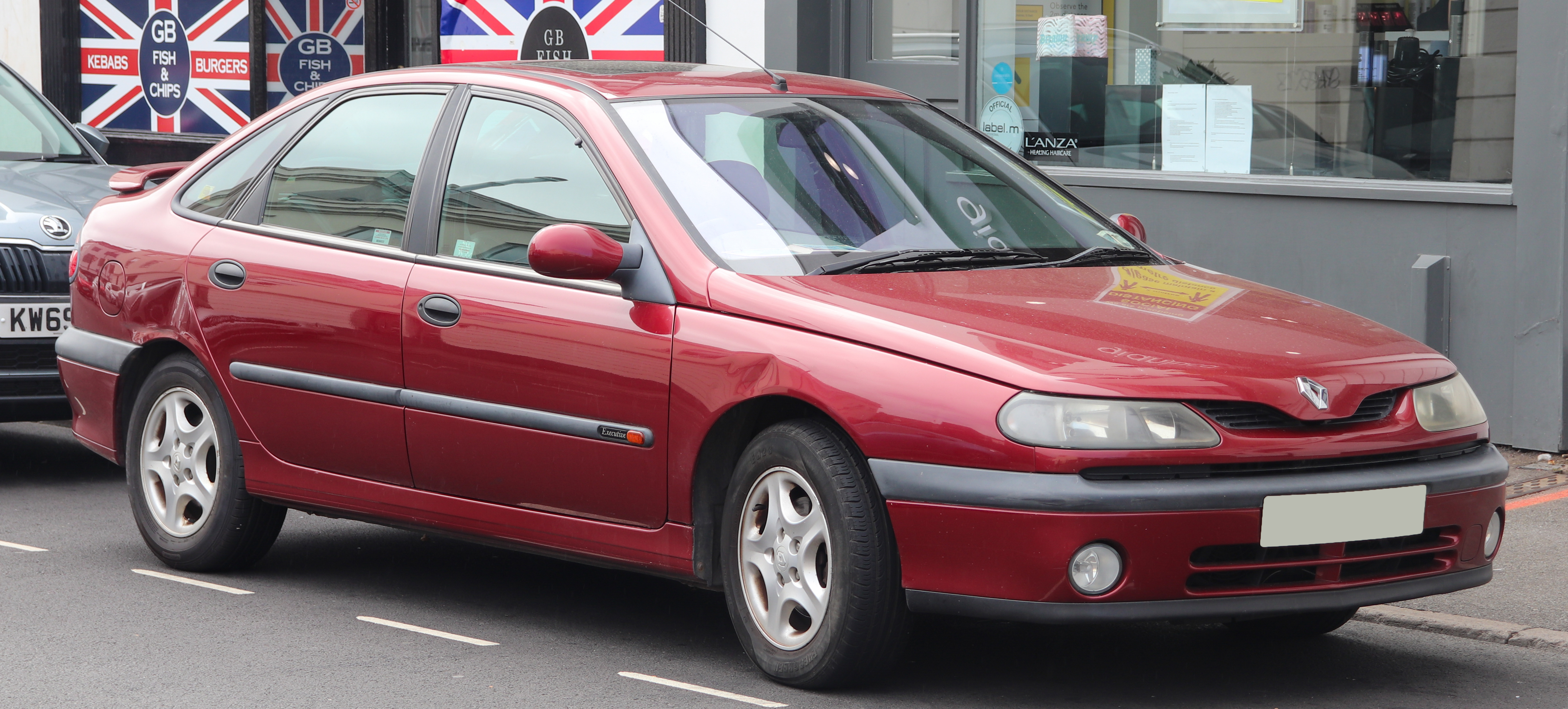

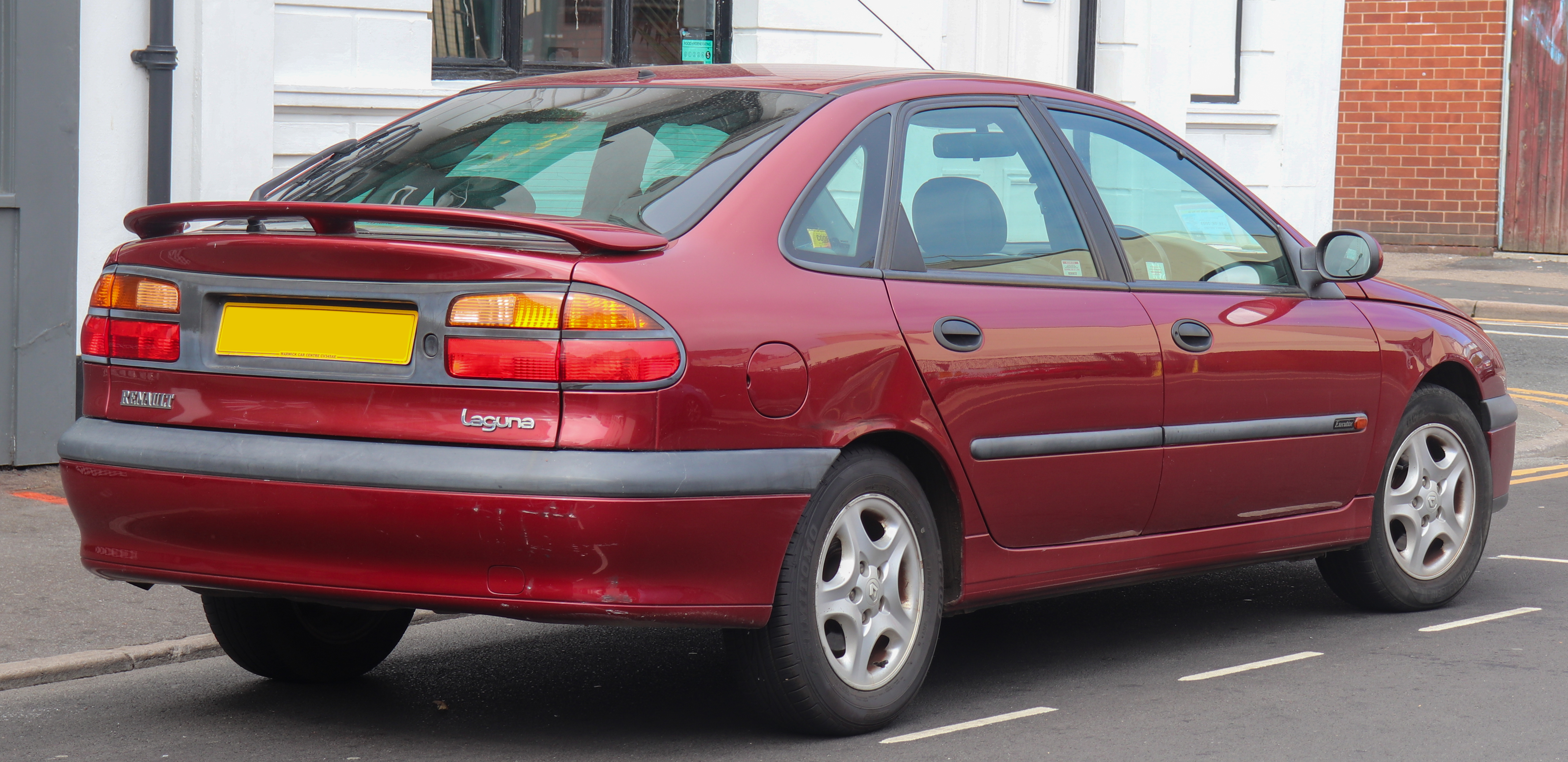
Facelifted Renault Laguna I

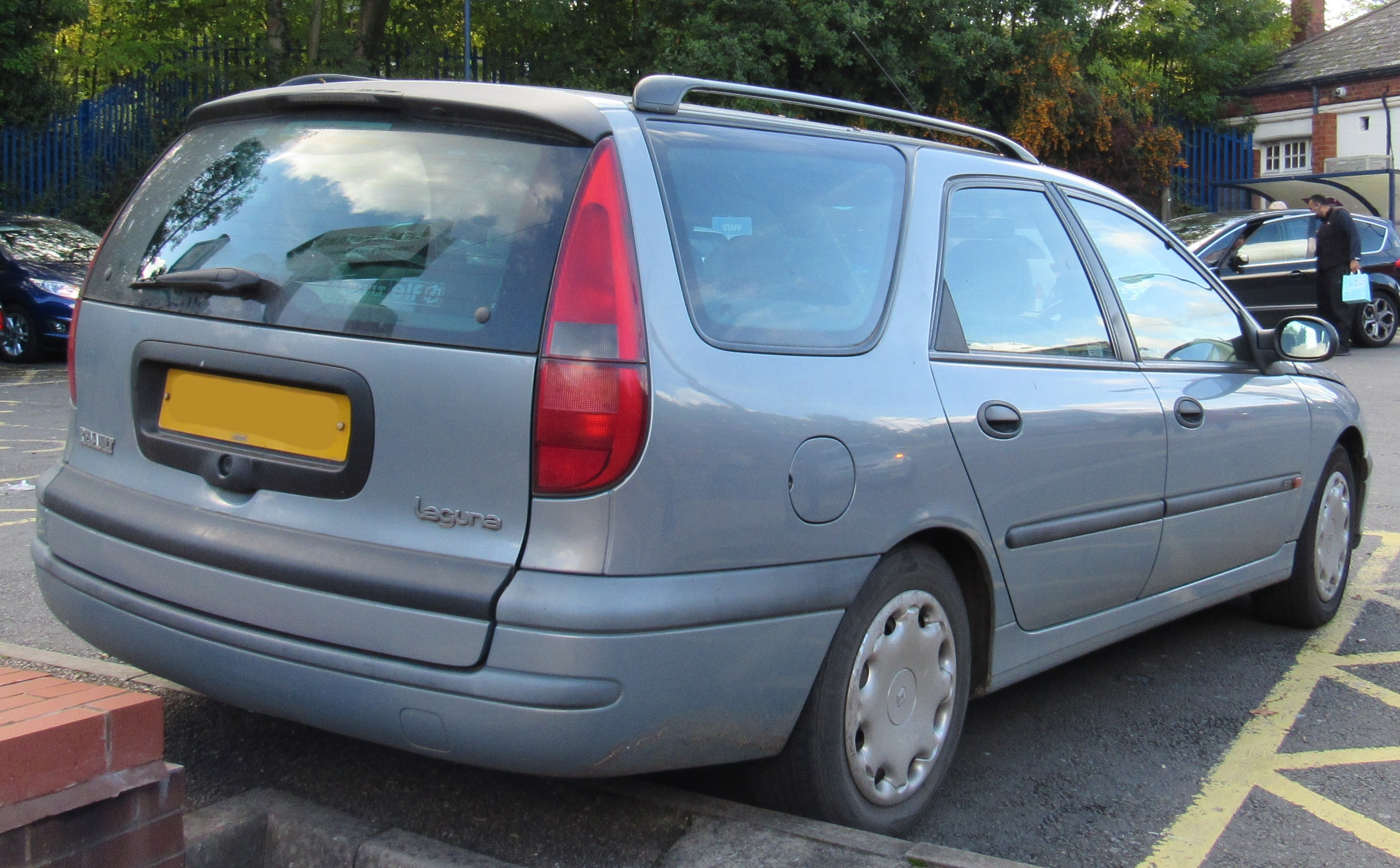
Facelifted Renault Laguna I (estate)

The Laguna received a moderate facelift in April 1998, including a restyling of the hatchback and the sports tourer versions, and a redesigned front. This also included a different facelifted design of the taillights, most noticeable are the circular fog lights in the front.

The engines were updated and, in some markets, equipment levels were enhanced again. Five new engines featured in the completed facelifted lineup:

- K4M 1.6 16v (110 hp)
- F4P 1.8 16v (120 hp)
- F3R 2.0 (114 hp)
- N7Q 2.0 S (140 hp)
- F4R 2.0 16v (139 hp)
- L7X 3.0 V6 24v (190 hp)
- F9Q turbo 1.9 dTi (turbocharged direct injection) (98 hp)
- F9Q turbo 1.9 dCi (turbocharged common rail direct injection) (107 hp)
- G8T turbo 2.2 dT (turbocharged indirect injection) (113 hp)

For 2000, the final edition of this Laguna, the Laguna Concorde, was introduced. It included semi-leather seats and vocal warnings like "Welcome. The vehicle computer... is now checking systems for you". The onboard computer would notify the driver of any doors not being closed, lights left on, etc., weather ("Please brake carefully the road is watery"), or other faults in the electrical or mechanical circuits.

The onboard voice synthesizer warnings system was also available on the earlier 1998 RXE and V6 models. This is the same basic unit as used in the Renault Safrane.

The model of the Laguna Concorde was the last guise of the "old" Laguna to be marketed, prior to the release of the Laguna II at the end of 2000. The last of the Mk.1 Lagunas were registered in February 2001, and the Concorde range all feature a cream letter "C" on a dark green background. This was with the outline of an actual Concorde above the letter.

== Second generation (X74; 2000) ==
Second generation (X74)
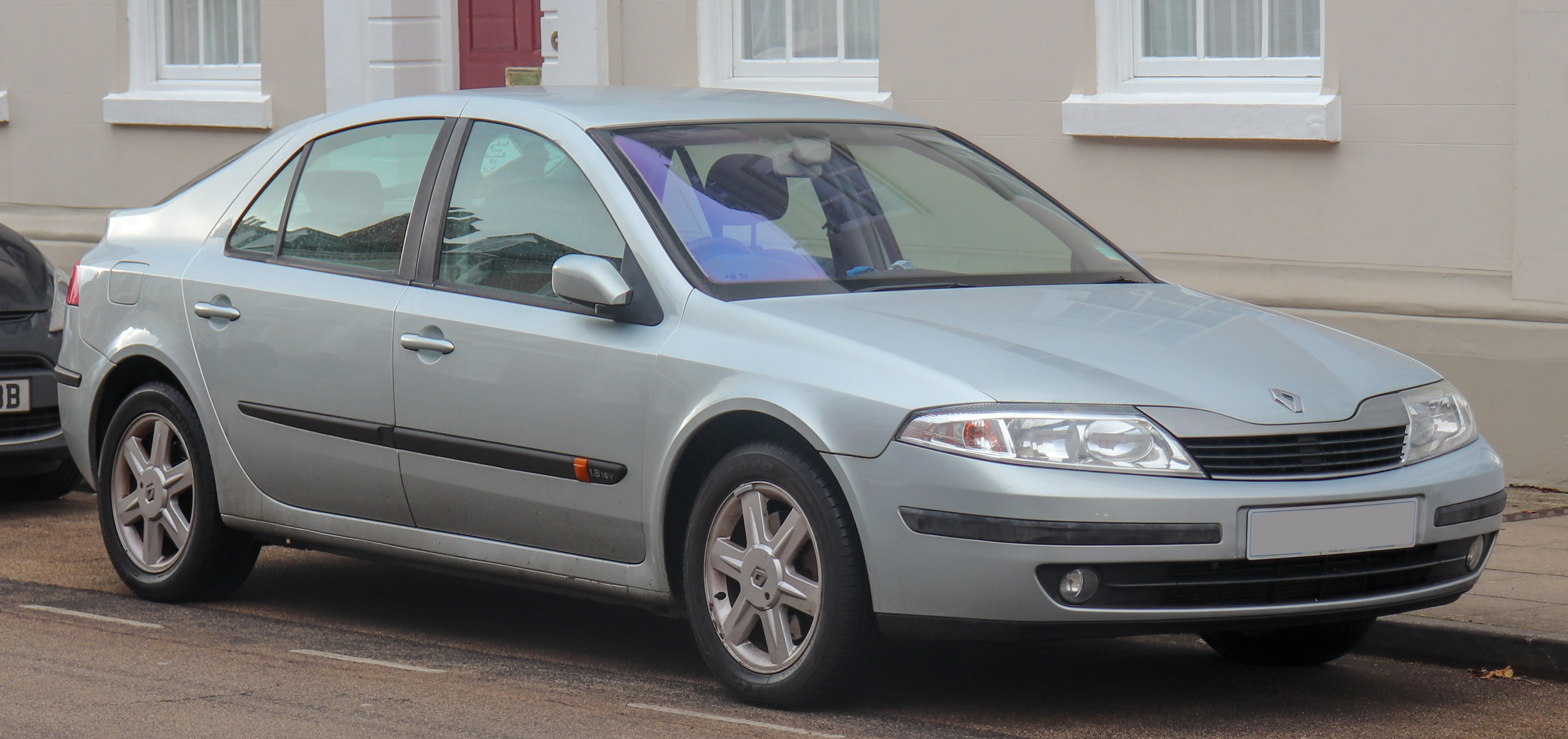

Overview
- Production: December 2000 – October 2007
- Model years: 2001–2008
- Assembly: France: Sandouville (Sandouville Renault Factory)

Body and chassis
- Body style: 5-door hatchback 5-door estate
- Platform: Renault M2
- Related: Renault Vel Satis

Powertrain
- Engine: Petrol: 1.6 L K4M I4; 1.8 L F4P I4; 2.0 L F4R I4; 2.0 L F5R IDE I4; 2.0 L F4Rt turbo I4; 3.0 L L7X V6; Diesel: 1.9 L F9Q dCi I4; 2.0 L M9R dCi I4; 2.2 L G9T dCi I4
- Transmission: 5 or 6-speed manual 4 or 5-speed automatic (BVA)

Dimensions
- Wheelbase: 2,748 mm (108.2 in)
- Length: Hatchback: 4,576 mm (180.2 in); Estate: 4,695 mm (184.8 in)
- Width: 1,772 mm (69.8 in)
- Height: Hatchback: 1,430 mm (56.3 in); Estate: 1,443 mm (56.8 in)
- Curb weight: 1,570 kg (3,460 lb) (2.2 diesel)

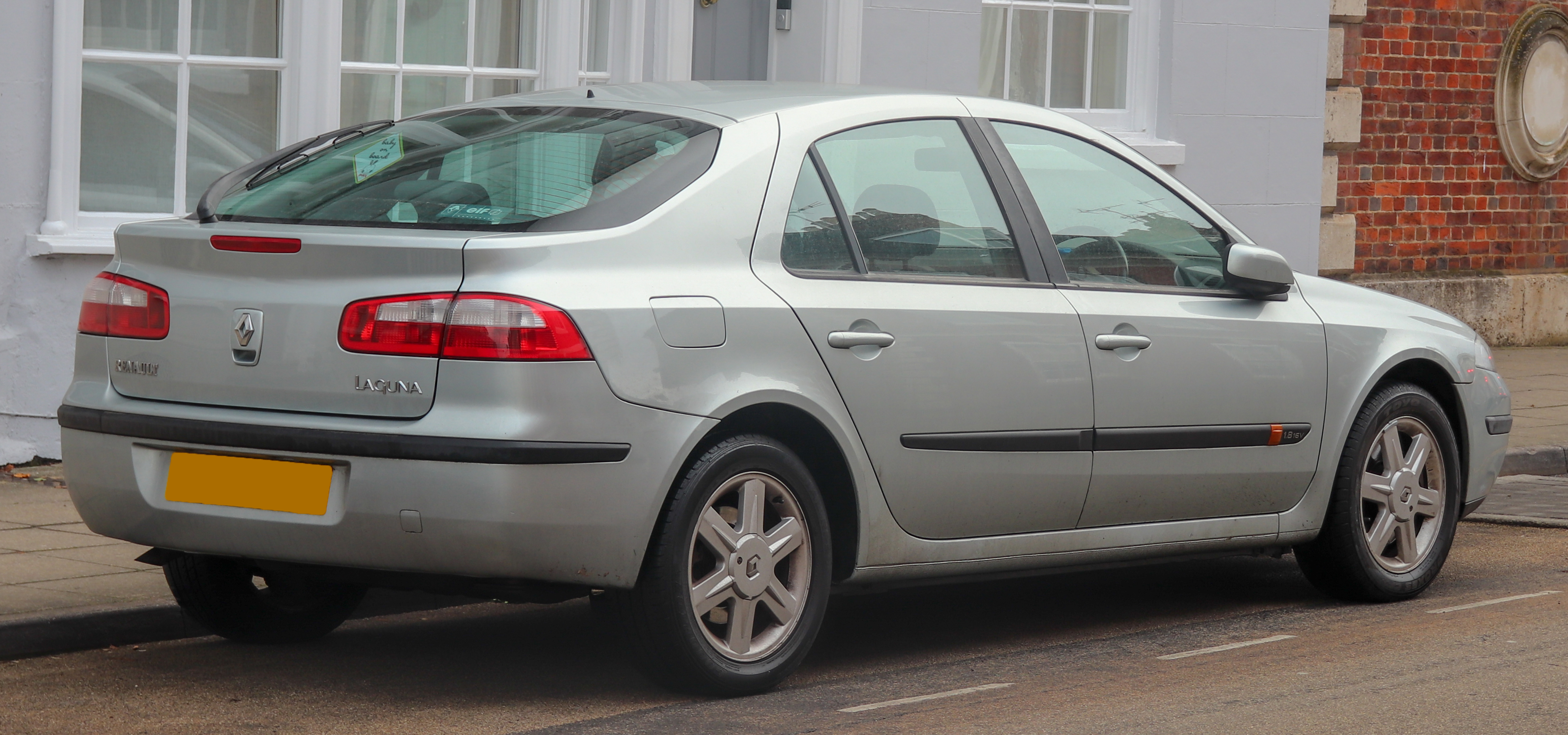
Hatchback (pre facelift)

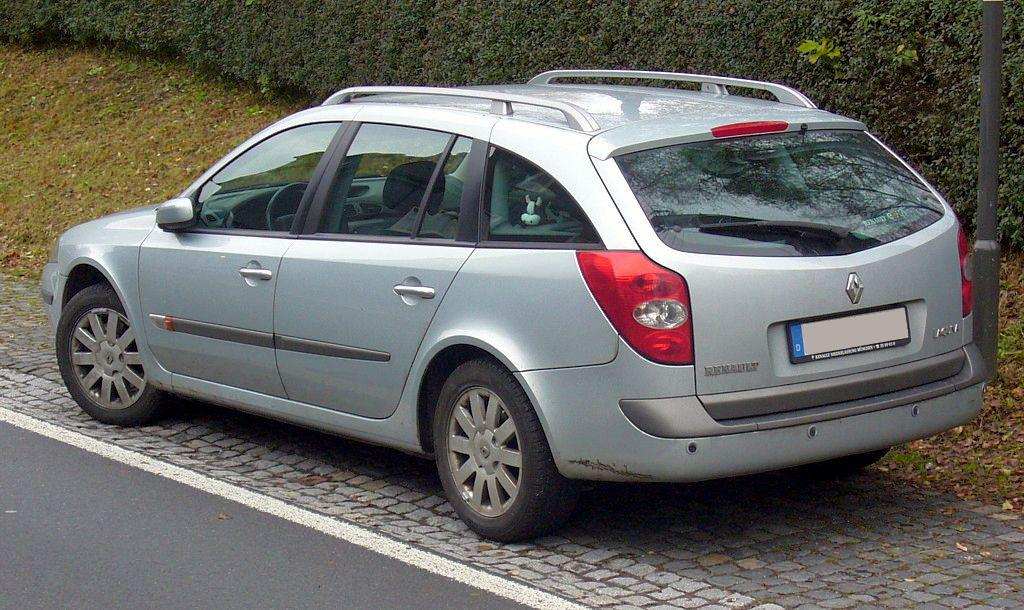
Estate (pre facelift)

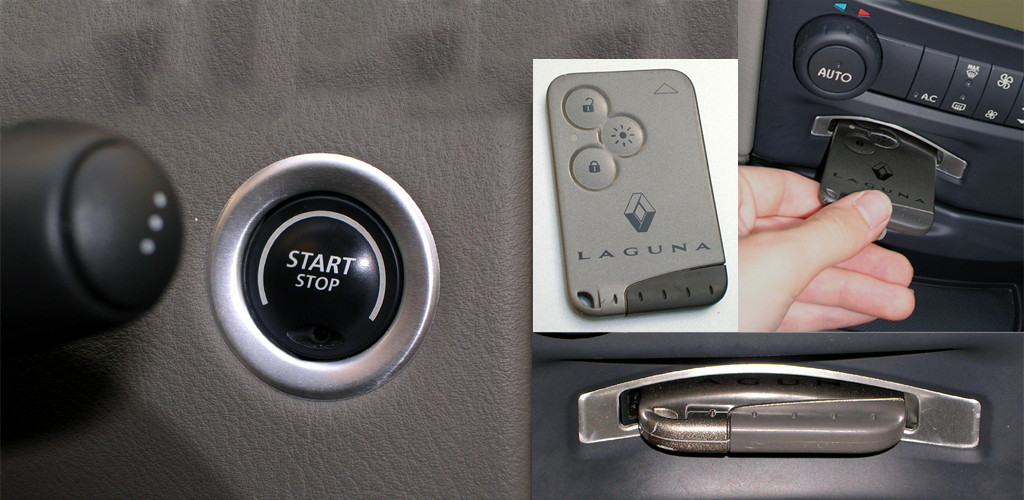
The Laguna's card system, and the replacement for a key ignition

After almost seven years in production, the original Laguna was replaced by an all new model in December 2000 for the 2001 model year. The engines were upgraded, and the equipment list made longer.

It was the first vehicle available in Europe to achieve five stars in the Euro NCAP crash test results, which was heavily promoted by Renault. The result was soon repeated in other models in Renault's range. This generation was made available in hatchback or estate (Grandtour) styles only.

The Laguna was the first European family car, and the second European car to feature "keyless" entry and ignition, developed by Valeo. Instead of a key, it used a credit card style device to unlock the car and start the engine. The initial unreliability of this keyless system hurt Laguna's reputation as well as Renault's reputation in general. The styling of the second generation Laguna was heavily influenced by the Initiale concept car.

The Laguna II won the title Semperit Irish Car of the Year in November 2001.

The Laguna estate was only available with five seats, unlike the previous model which had seven seats as an option on some versions. It was badged as Sports Tourer or Grandtour, depending on the country. It was also marketed as a lifestyle vehicle, rather than a load carrier.

=== Facelift ===
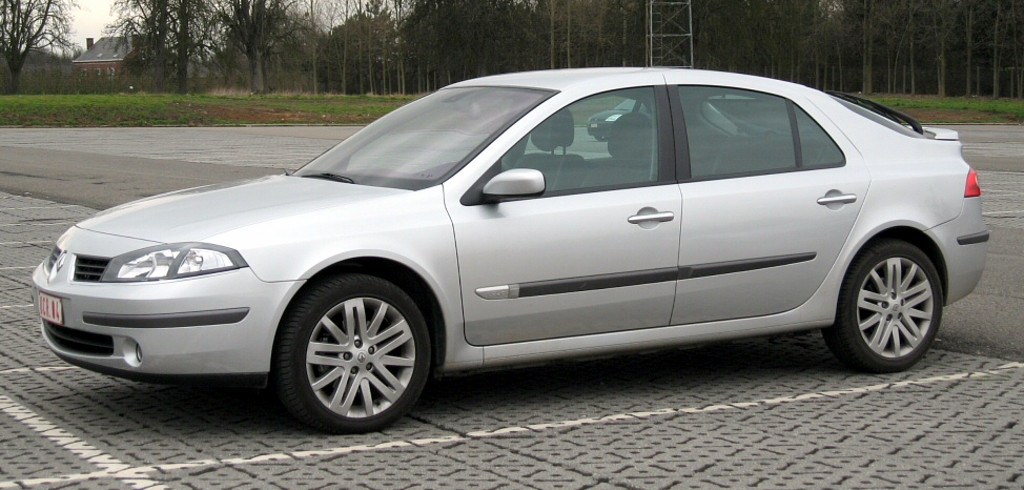
Facelifted Renault Laguna II (2005–2007)

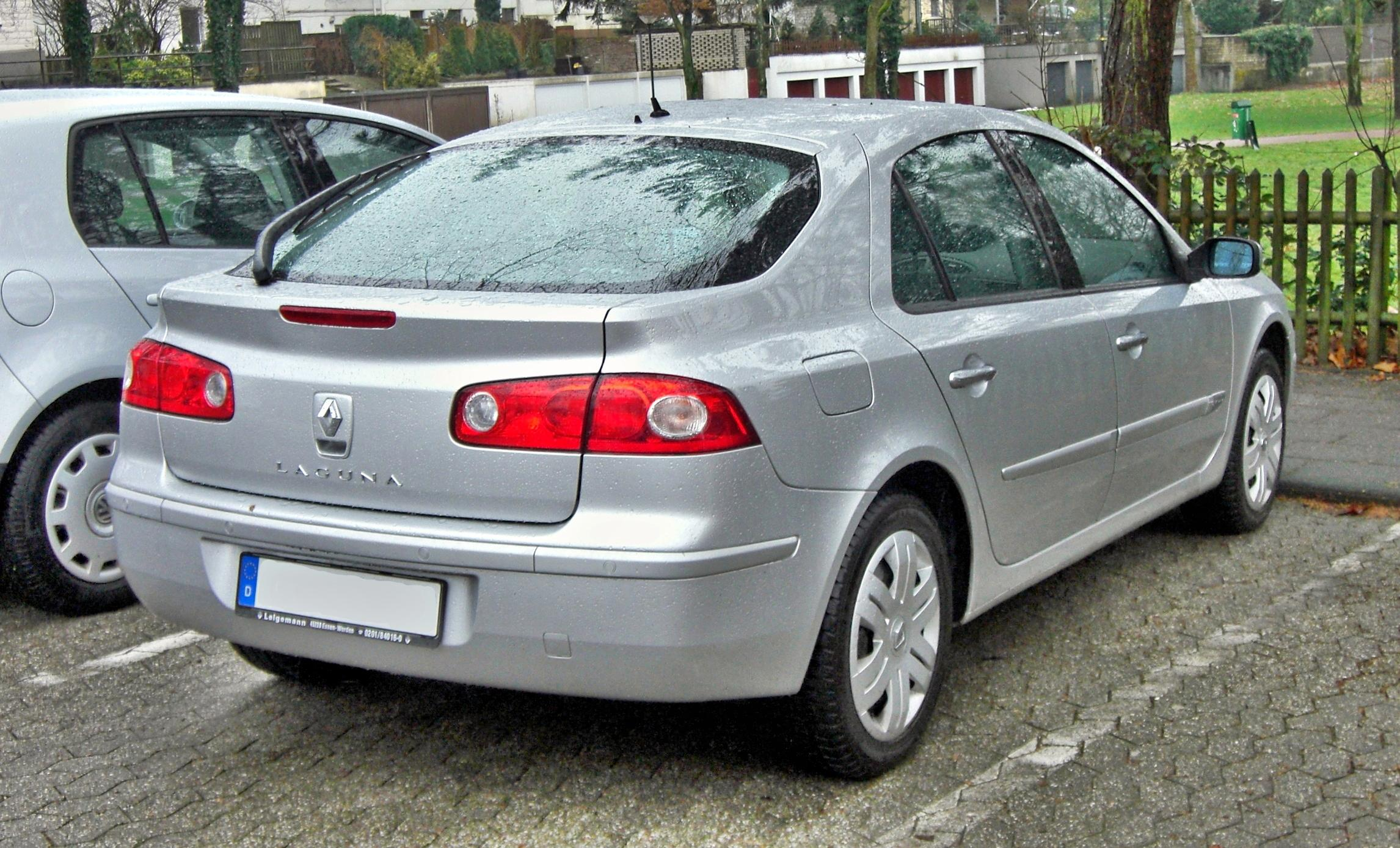
Facelifted Renault Laguna (2005–2007)

The Laguna II was facelifted in March 2005, being launched in the AutoRAI in Amsterdam, according to Renault with improved security, driving performance, and comfort. It also had a moderate redesign of the air intake at the front of the car, now matching the design of the Megane. Sales commenced on 18 March 2005.

An electronic handbrake was also introduced, this was previously seen on the Scénic and Espace. The engines were much the same as before, with the 1.6 and 1.8 petrol units being offered in some markets, while other countries get a 2.0 petrol unit (turbo or non-turbo) and two diesels (1.9 or 2.2 direct injection).

After the facelift, a new diesel engine was introduced, the 2.0 dCi with 150 hp (110 kW) and another variant of the engine which produced 175 hp (129 kW).

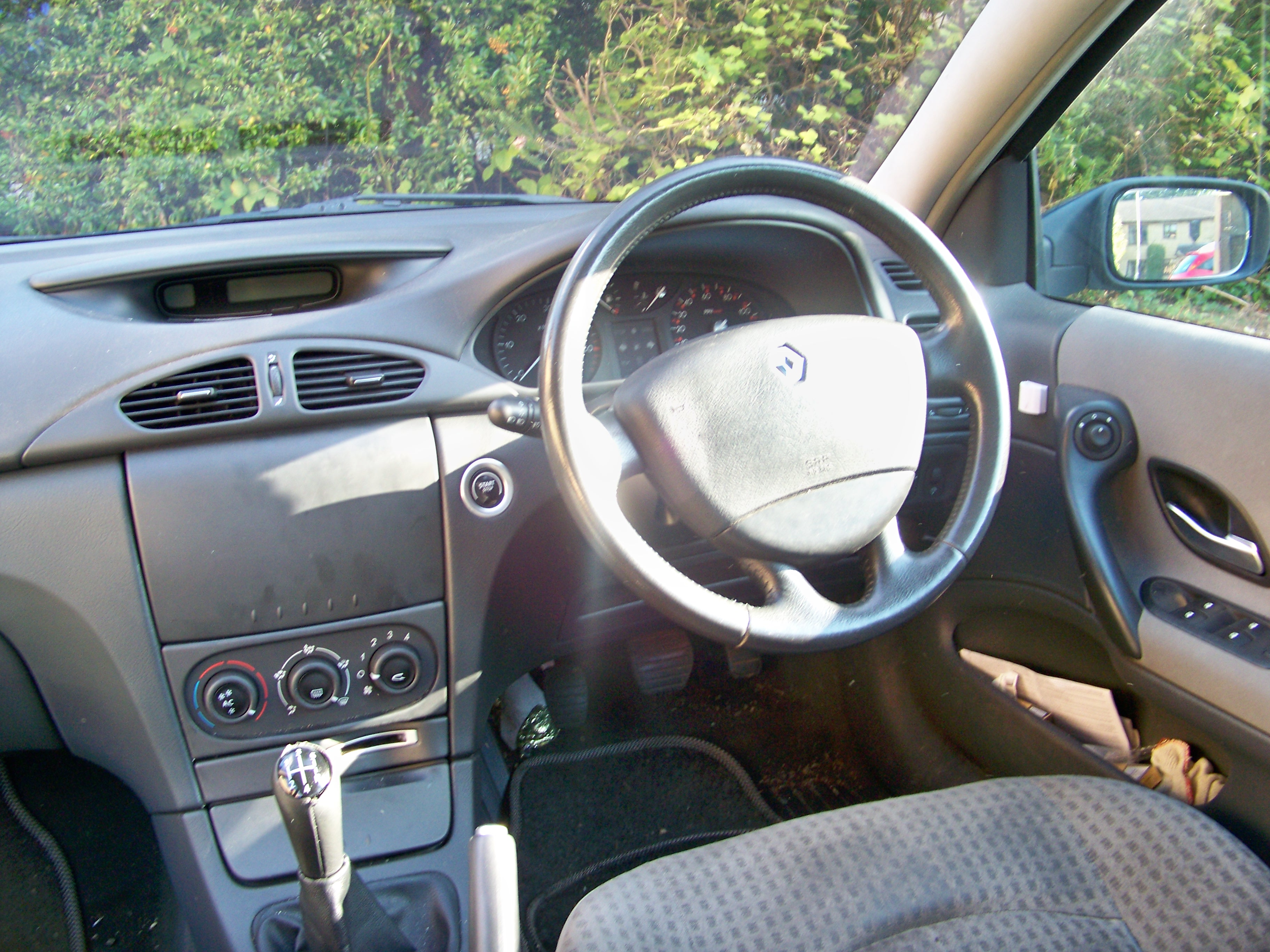
Interior

=== Engines ===
| Model | Engine type | Displacement | Valvetrain | Fuel system | Max. power at rpm | Max. torque at rpm | 0–100 km/h (0–62 mph) | Top speed | Years |
|---|---|---|---|---|---|---|---|---|---|
Petrol engines
| 1.6 16v | K4M-710 | 1598 cc | I4 DOHC 16v | Multi point fuel injection | 81 kW (110 PS; 109 hp) at 5,750 rpm | 148 N⋅m (109 lb⋅ft) at 3750 rpm | 11.5 s | 195 km/h (121 mph) | 2001–05 |
| 1.6 16v | K4M-716 | 1598 cc | I4 DOHC 16v | Multi point fuel injection | 86 kW (117 PS; 115 hp) at 5,750 rpm | 148 N⋅m (109 lb⋅ft) at 3750 rpm | 11.5 s | 197 km/h (122 mph) | 2005–07 |
| 1.8 16v | F4P-C770 | 1783 cc | I4 DOHC 16v | Multi point fuel injection | 88 kW (120 PS; 118 hp) at 5,750 rpm | 165 N⋅m (122 lb⋅ft) at 3500 rpm | 10.7 s | 203 km/h (126 mph) | 2001–05 |
| 1.8 16v | F4P-K771 | 1783 cc | I4 DOHC 16v | Multi point fuel injection | 88 kW (120 PS; 118 hp) at 5,750 rpm | 165 N⋅m (122 lb⋅ft) at 3500 rpm | 10.7 s | 203 km/h (126 mph) | 2001–05 |
| 2.0 16v IDE | F5R-700 | 1998 cc | I4 DOHC 16v | Direct fuel injection | 103 kW (140 PS; 138 hp) at 5500 rpm | 200 N⋅m (148 lb⋅ft) at 4100 rpm | 9.8 s | 210 km/h (130 mph) | 2001–03 |
| 2.0 16v | F4R-712 | 1998 cc | I4 DOHC 16v | Multi point fuel injection | 99 kW (135 PS; 133 hp) at 5500 rpm | 191 N⋅m (141 lb⋅ft) at 3750 rpm | 9.9 s | 205 km/h (127 mph) | 2002–05 |
| 2.0 16v | F4R-713 | 1998 cc | I4 DOHC 16v | Multi point fuel injection | 99 kW (135 PS; 133 hp) at 5500 rpm | 191 N⋅m (141 lb⋅ft) at 3750 rpm | 9.9 s (12.1 s) | 200 km/h (124 mph) | 2005–07 |
| 2.0 16v Turbo | F4Rt-764 | 1998 cc | Turbo I4 DOHC 16v | Multi point fuel injection | 120 kW (163 PS; 161 hp) at 5000 rpm | 270 N⋅m (199 lb⋅ft) at 3250 rpm | 8.5 s | 218 km/h (135 mph) | 2003–05 |
| 2.0 16v Turbo | F4Rt-786 | 1998 cc | Turbo I4 DOHC 16v | Multi point fuel injection | 125 kW (170 PS; 168 hp) at 5000 rpm | 270 N⋅m (199 lb⋅ft) at 3250 rpm | 8.4 s | 223 km/h (139 mph) | 2005–07 |
| 2.0 16v Turbo | F4Rt-784 | 1998 cc | Turbo I4 DOHC 16v | Multi point fuel injection | 150 kW (204 PS; 201 hp) at 5000 rpm | 300 N⋅m (221 lb⋅ft) at 3000 rpm | 7.2 s | 235 km/h (146 mph) | 2005–07 |
| 3.0 V6 24v | L7X-E731 | 2946 cc | V6 DOHC 24v | Multi point fuel injection | 152 kW (207 PS; 204 hp) at 6000 rpm | 285 N⋅m (210 lb⋅ft) at 3750 rpm | 8.1 s | 235 km/h (146 mph) | 2001–05 |
| 3.0 V6 24v | L7X-731 | 2946 cc | V6 DOHC 24v | Multi point fuel injection | 152 kW (207 PS; 204 hp) at 6000 rpm | 285 N⋅m (210 lb⋅ft) at 3750 rpm | 8.0 s | 235 km/h (146 mph) | 2005–07 |
Diesel engines
| 1.9 dCi | F9Q-T752 | 1,870 cc | I4 SOHC 8v | Direct injection | 75 kW (102 PS; 101 hp) at 4,000 rpm | 215 N⋅m (159 lb⋅ft) at 2,000 rpm | 13.0 s | 185 km/h (115 mph) | 2001–05 |
| 1.9 dCi | F9Q-T754 | 1,870 cc | I4 SOHC 8v | Direct injection | 77 kW (105 PS; 103 hp) at 4,000 rpm | 250 N⋅m (184 lb⋅ft) at 2,000 rpm | 12.3 s | 190 km/h (118 mph) | 2005–07 |
| 1.9 dCi | F9Q-T750 | 1,870 cc | I4 SOHC 8v | Direct injection | 88 kW (120 PS; 118 hp) at 4,000 rpm | 270 N⋅m (199 lb⋅ft) at 2,000 rpm | 10.7 s | 205 km/h (127 mph) | 2001–07 |
| 1.9 dCi | F9Q-758 | 1,870 cc | I4 SOHC 8v | Direct injection | 96 kW (131 PS; 129 hp) at 4,000 rpm | 300 N⋅m (221 lb⋅ft) at 2,000 rpm | 10.2 s | 205 km/h (127 mph) | 2005–07 |
| 2.0 dCi | M9R-742 | 1,995 cc | I4 DOHC 16v | Direct injection | 110 kW (150 PS; 148 hp) at 4,000 rpm | 340 N⋅m (251 lb⋅ft) at 2,000 rpm | 8.9 s | 215 km/h (134 mph) | 2005–07 |
| 2.0 dCi | M9R | 1,995 cc | I4 DOHC 16v | Direct injection | 129 kW (175 PS; 173 hp) at 4,000 rpm | 360 N⋅m (266 lb⋅ft) at 2,000 rpm | 8.4 s | 225 km/h (140 mph) | 2005–07 |
| 2.2 dCi | G9T-D700 | 2,188 cc | I4 DOHC 16v | Direct injection | 110 kW (150 PS; 148 hp) at 4,300 rpm | 250 N⋅m (184 lb⋅ft) at 2,000 rpm | 9.8 s | 195 km/h (121 mph) | 2002–05 |
| 2.2 dCi | G9T-D703 | 2,188 cc | I4 DOHC 16v | Direct injection | 110 kW (150 PS; 148 hp) at 4,300 rpm | 250 N⋅m (184 lb⋅ft) at 2,000 rpm | 10.9 s | 195 km/h (121 mph) | 2002–05 |

== Third generation (X91; 2007) ==
Third generation (X91)
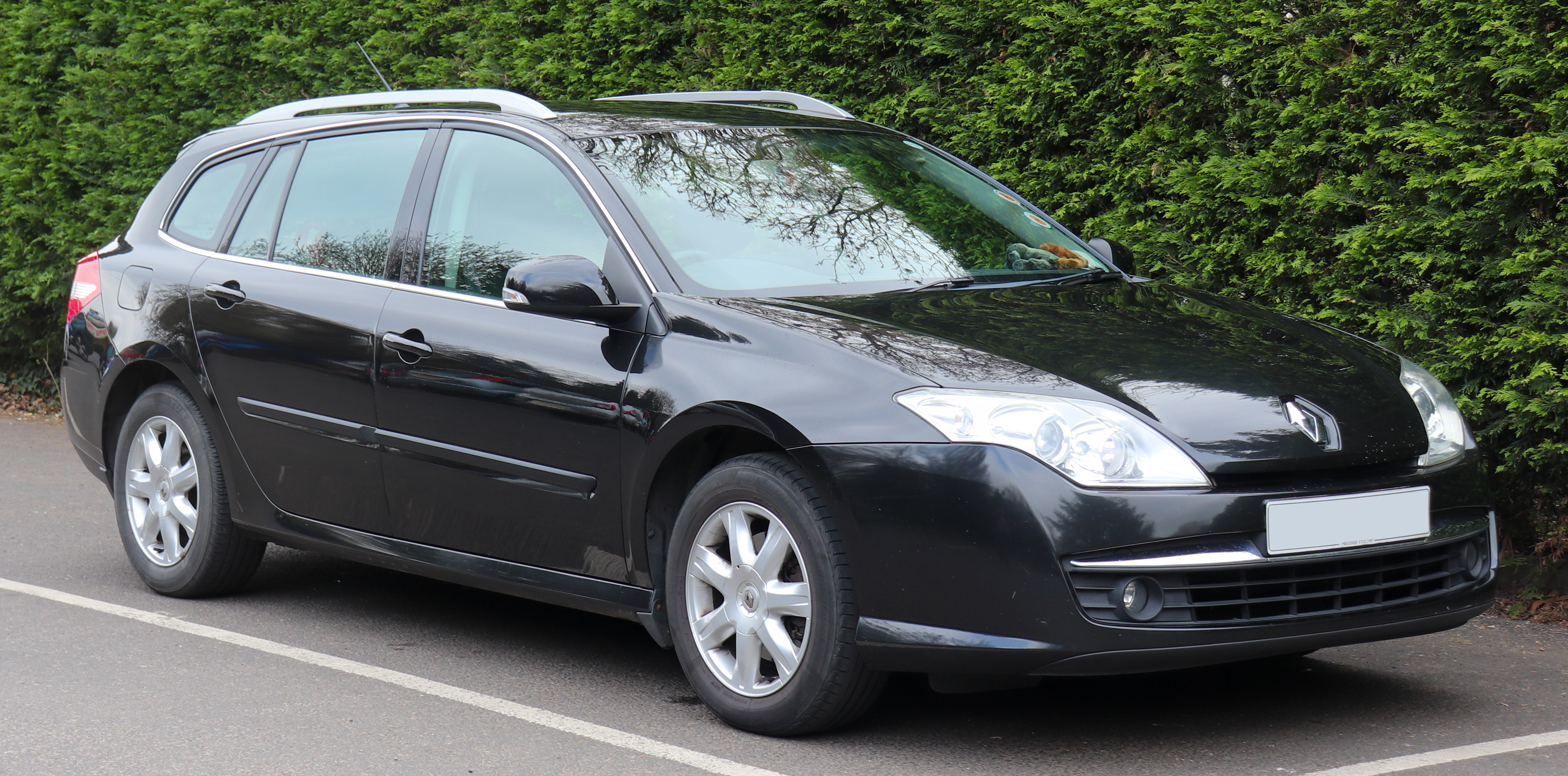

Overview
- Production: October 2007 – March 2015 (LHD); October 2007 – February 2012 (RHD) (except Australia)
- Model years: 2008–2015
- Assembly: France: Sandouville (Sandouville Renault Factory

Body and chassis
- Body style: 5-door hatchback 5-door estate 2-door coupé
- Platform: Renault–Nissan D platform
- Related: Renault Latitude; Renault Samsung SM5 (L43); Nissan Altima (L32); Nissan Teana (J32)

Powertrain
- Engine: Petrol: 1.6 L K4M I4; 2.0 L M4R I4; 2.0 L F4R turbo I4; 3.5 L V4Y V6; Diesel: 1.5 L K9K I4; 2.0 L M9R I4; 3.0 L V9X V6
- Transmission: 6-speed manual 6-speed automatic (BVA); 6-speed dual-clutch (EDC)

Dimensions
- Wheelbase: 2,756 mm (108.5 in)
- Length: 4,695 mm (184.8 in)
- Width: 1,811 mm (71.3 in)
- Height: 1,445 mm (56.9 in)
- Curb weight: 1,560 kg (3,440 lb) (diesel)

The Renault Laguna III was officially announced in a press release on 4 June 2007. The car was unveiled to the public at the Frankfurt Motor Show in September, and it went on sale in October 2007 for the 2008 model year. The car comes as a five-door hatchback (B91), a five-door estate (K91), and for the first time a two-door coupé (D91).

This third generation is based on the platform D, shared with the Nissan Altima, the Nissan Teana, and the Nissan Murano. The Laguna III was the first car to have gone through the Aubevoye Technical Centre's Electro Magnetic Compatibility unit, in the course of its development.

The coupé version was first presented as a concept car, at the 2007 Frankfurt Motor Show, which followed some styling cues of the previous concept car, the Renault Fluence. The production version was revealed at the 2008 Cannes Film Festival, coinciding with the Monaco Formula 1 Grand Prix to take the wraps off.

The brand new V6 dCi engine delivers 235 hp (173 kW), while the new 3.5 litre petrol powered V6 offers 240 hp (175 kW). The Laguna Coupé later appeared before the general public at the Paris Motor Show in October 2008. In January 2008, spy images of a then possible Laguna Sedan appeared on the internet.

It was expected the car having appeared at the 2008 Paris Motor Show. However, this never made it to production. The Renault Latitude and the third generation (L43) Renault Samsung SM5, which is made by Renault Samsung Motors, South Korea is based on the Laguna III.

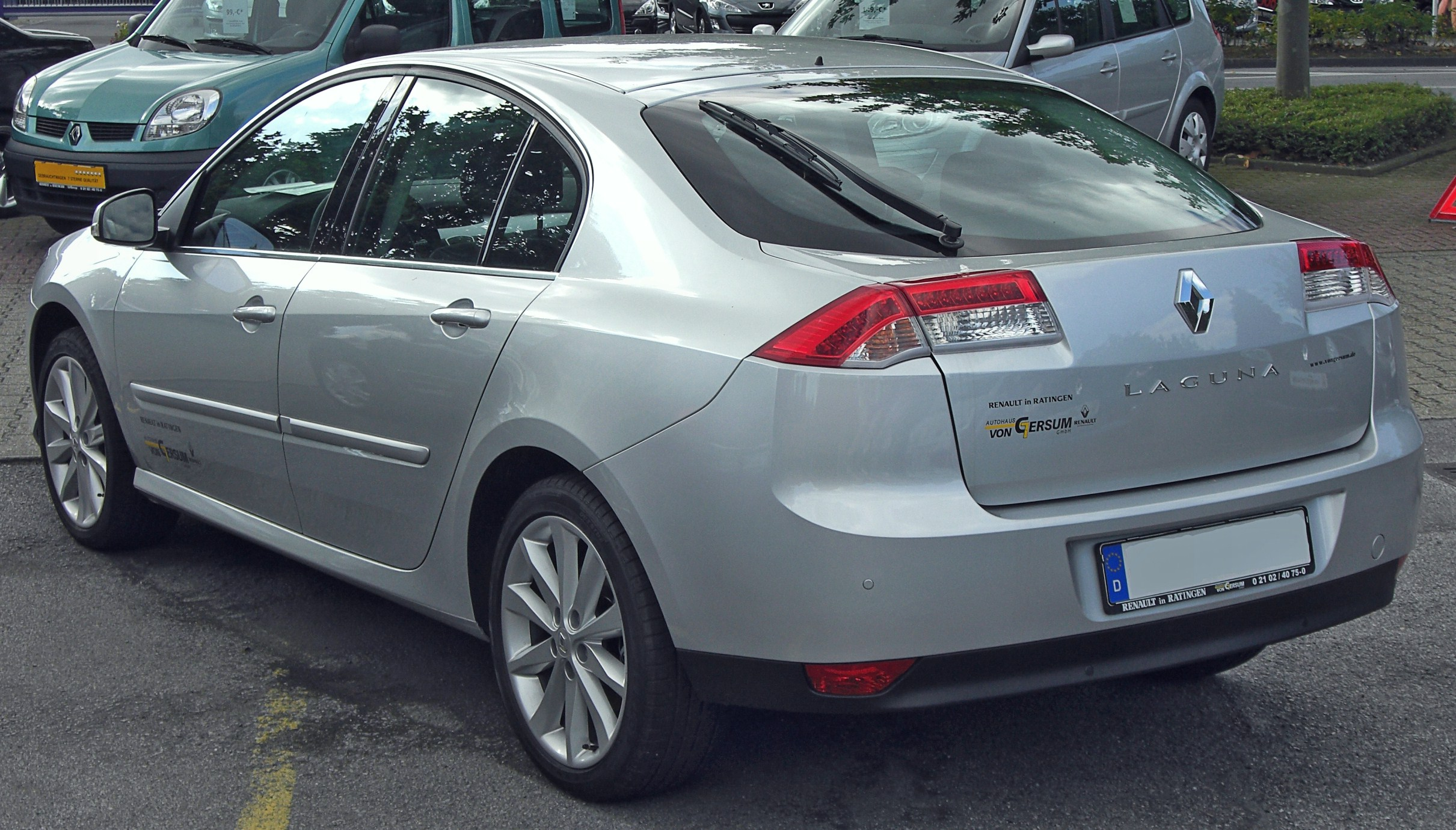
Laguna III hatchback

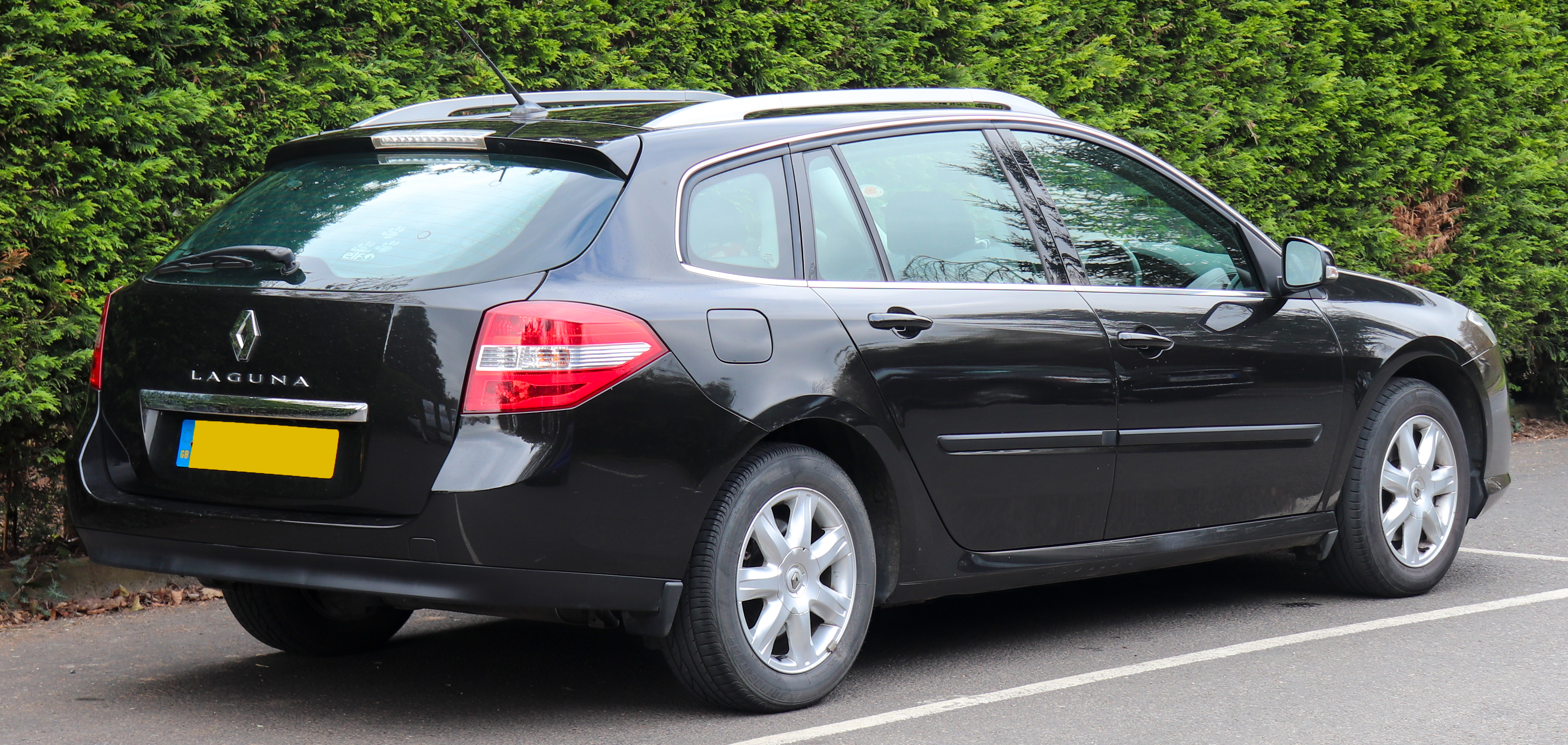
Estate

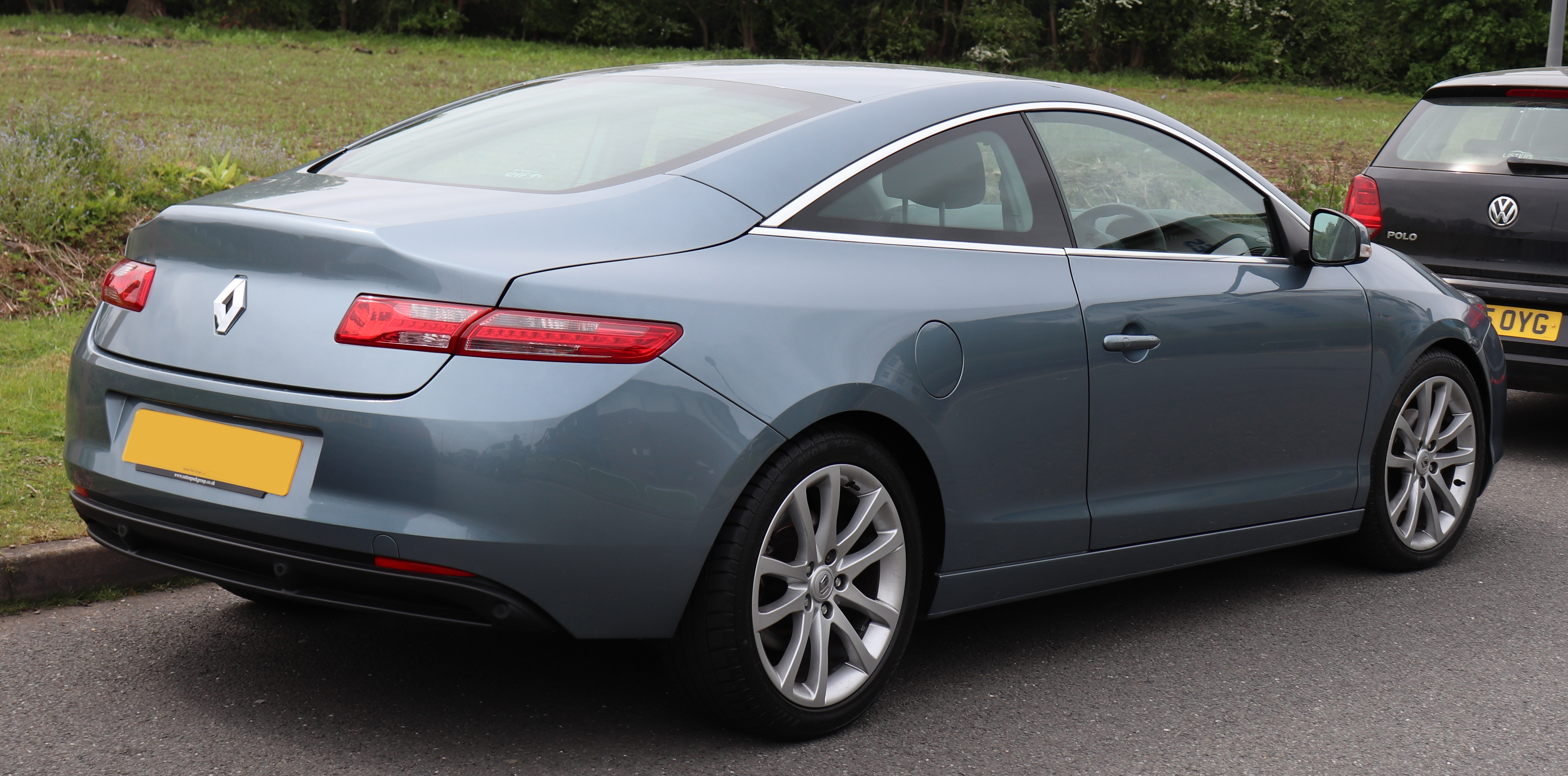
Coupé

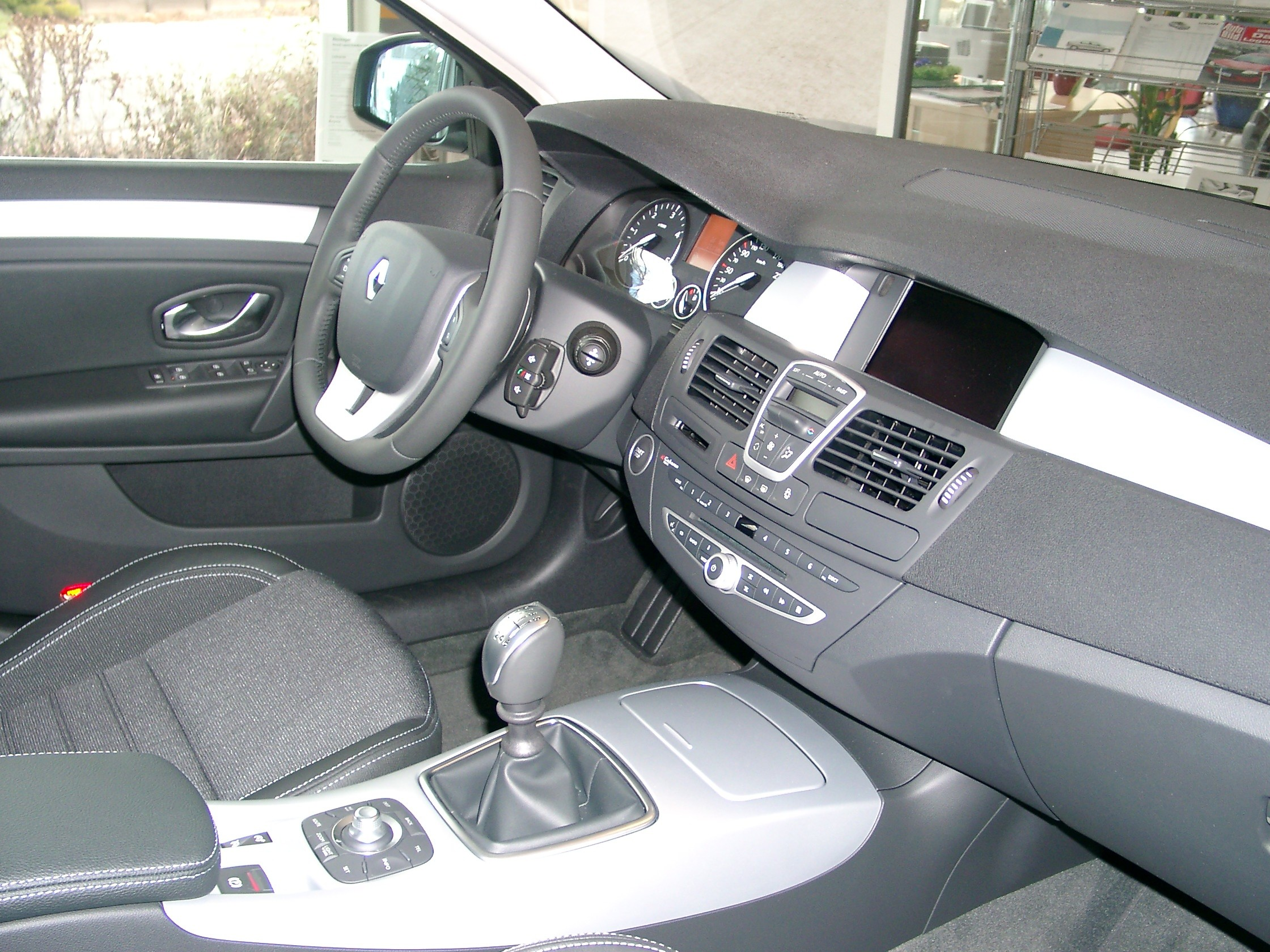
Interior

=== Facelift ===
A facelifted version of the Laguna III, called the Phase 2, débuted at the 2010 Paris Motor Show, and sales began in November 2010.

It has an aggressive front end compared to the older model. The range has been redesigned around six trim levels: Expression, Black Edition, Eco Business, Bose, GT 4Control, and Initiale. Engine side, the only change is the engine 1.5 dCi with 110 PS (81 kW), with CO_{2} emissions decreased from 130 to 120g/km.

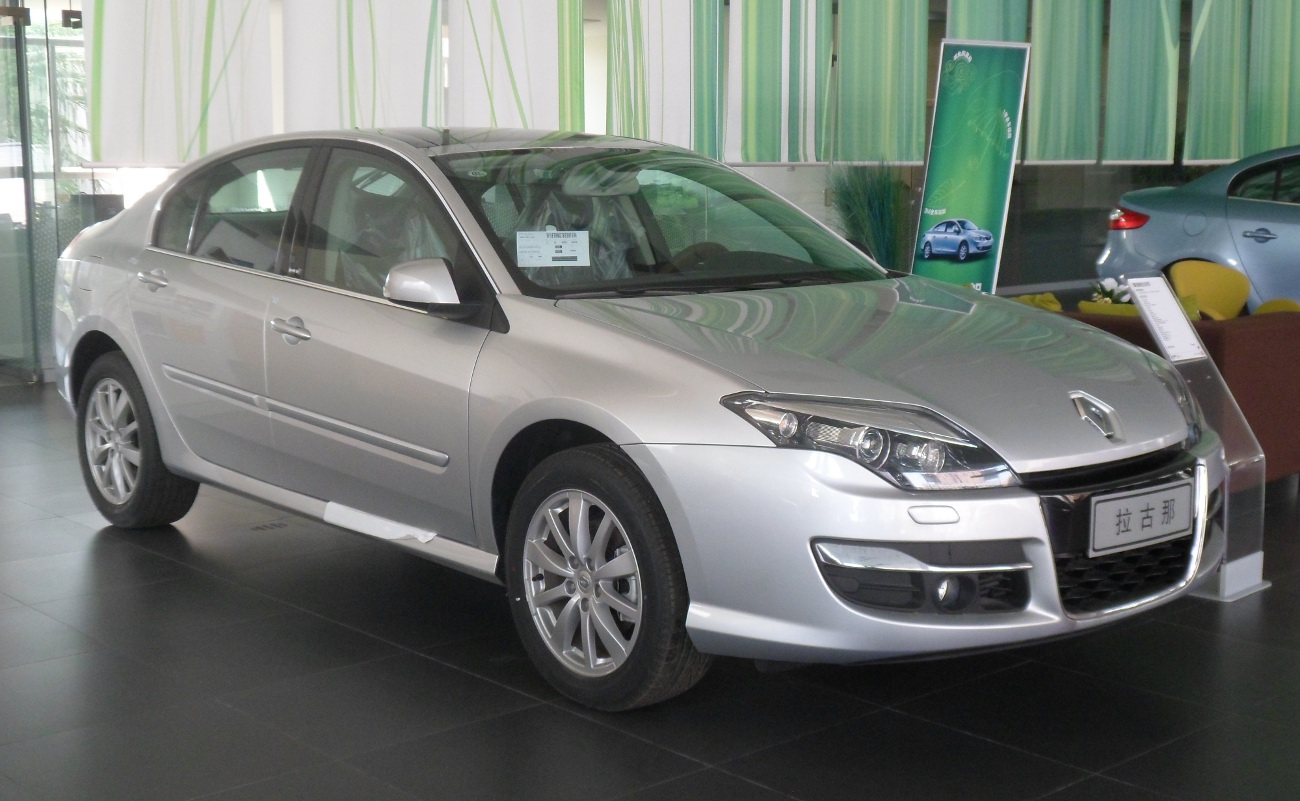
Facelift (2010)

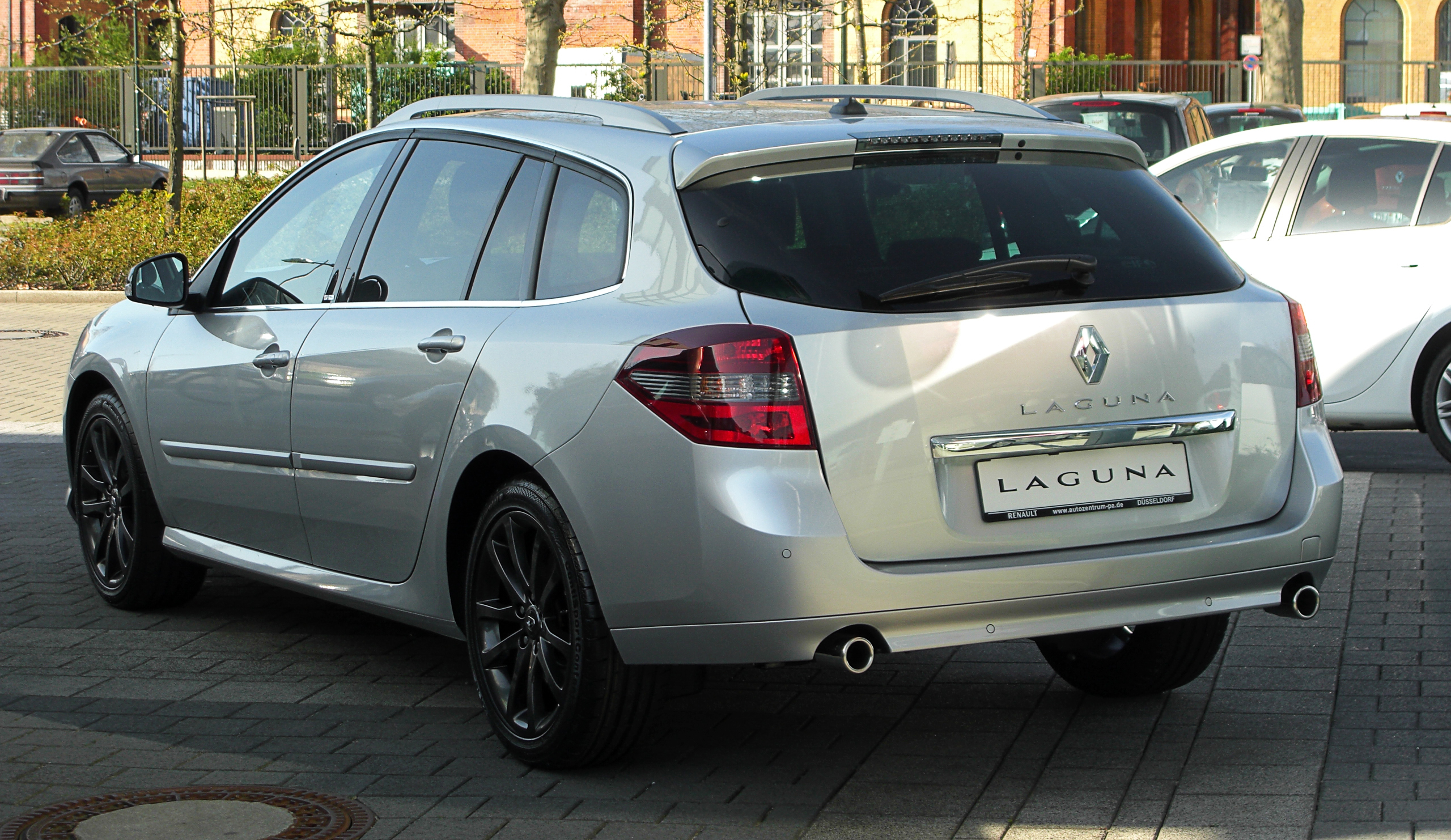
Facelift Grandtour (rear view)

=== Engines ===
- 1.5 L (1461 cc) 8 valve dCi I4; 110 hp (81 kW); top speed: 192 km/h (119 mph); 0–100 km/h; 12.1 s; 2007–2015
- 1.6 L (1598 cc) 16 valve I4; 110 hp (81 kW); top speed: 192 km/h (119 mph); 0–100 km/h; 11.7 s; 2007–2010
- 2.0 L (1997 cc) 16 valve I4; 140 hp (103 kW); top speed: 210 km/h (130 mph); 0–100 km/h; 10.1 s; 2007–2015
- 2.0 L (1998 cc) 16 valve Turbo I4; 170 hp (125 kW); top speed: 220 km/h (137 mph); 0–100 km/h; 9.2 s; 2007–2015
- 2.0 L (1998 cc) 16 valve Turbo I4; 205 hp (151 kW); top speed: 232 km/h (144 mph); 0–100 km/h; 7.8 s; 2008–2012
- 2.0 L (1995 cc) 16 valve dCi I4; 130 hp (96 kW); top speed: 204 km/h (127 mph); 0–100 km/h; 10.6 s; 2007–2015
- 2.0 L (1995 cc) 16 valve dCi I4; 150 hp (110 kW); top speed: 210 km/h (130 mph); 0–100 km/h; 9.5 s; 2007–2015
- 2.0 L (1995 cc) 16 valve dCi I4; 175 hp (129 kW); top speed: 220 km/h (137 mph); 0–100 km/h; 8.7; 2007–2015
- 2.0 L (1995 cc) 16 valve dCi I4; 180 hp (132 kW); top speed: 222 km/h (138 mph); 0–100 km/h; 8.5 s; 2008–2015
- 3.0 L (2993 cc) 24 valve dCi V6; 235 hp (173 kW); top speed: 242 km/h (150 mph); 0–100 km/h; 7.3 s; 2008–2015
- 3.5 L (3498 cc) 24 valve V6; 238 hp (175 kW); 244 km/h (152 mph); 0–100 km/h; 7.4 s; 2008–2015

In February 2012, Renault discontinued the Laguna, Espace, Kangoo, Modus, and Wind lines in right-hand drive markets. In 2015, both the Laguna and the Latitude were replaced by the Talisman, for which a right-hand drive version was not produced. 54,840 Laguna Coupé have been produced out of total 351,384.

== Successor ==
Renault was rumoured considering changing the Laguna name to Atalans for the successor. In May 2015, Worldcarfans reported the successor would première on 6 July 2015, and would also replace the Latitude in the European market. The coupé version would also be discontinued, due to low demand. On 6 July 2015, Renault announced the successor will be called Talisman, as part of its intention of unifying nameplates worldwide.
