= Renault Vel Satis =

Executive hatchback produced by Renault (2001–2009)

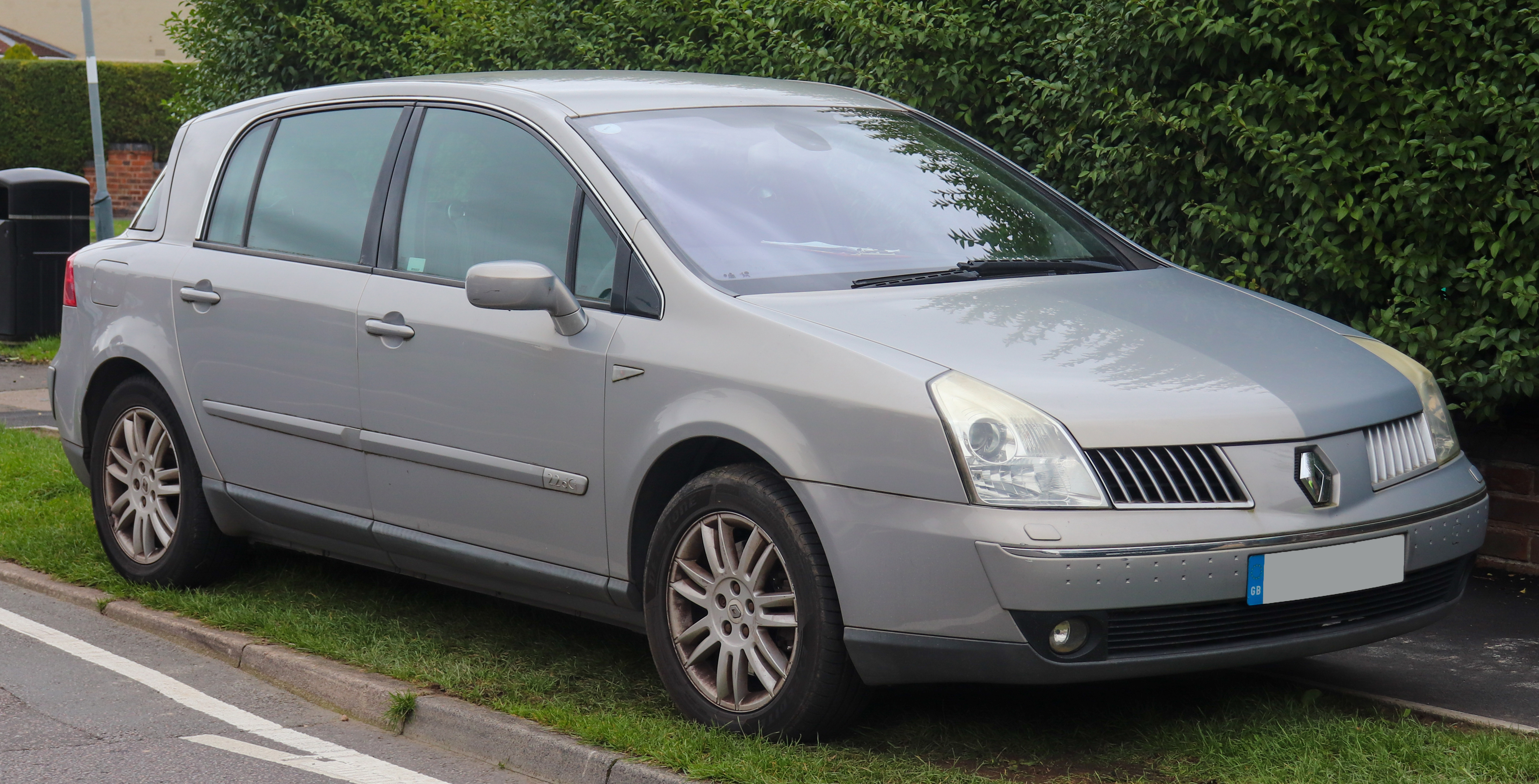
- Renault Vel Satis (Pre-facelift)

Overview
- Manufacturer: Renault
- Production: 2001–2009 (LHD, 62,201 units); 2001–2005 (RHD, 1,293 units)
- Assembly: France: Sandouville (Sandouville Renault Factory)
- Designer: Patrick Le Quément

Body and chassis
- Class: Executive car (E)
- Body style: 5-door hatchback
- Layout: FF layout
- Platform: Renault M2
- Related: Renault Laguna II; Renault Espace IV

Powertrain
- Engine: petrol: 2.0 L F4RT turbo I4 DOHC MPI 16v; 3.5 L Nissan V4Y V6 DOHC CVVTCS 24v; diesel: 2.0 L Renault-Nissan M9R dCi turbo I4 DOHC VVT 16v; 2.2 L G9T dCi turbo I4 DOHC VVT 16v; 3.0 L DMAX/Isuzu/GM P9X dCi turbo V6 DOHC VVT 24v
- Transmission: 6-speed manual; 5-speed automatic; 6-speed automatic

Dimensions
- Length: 4,860 mm (191.3 in)
- Width: 1,860 mm (73.2 in)
- Height: 1,580 mm (62.2 in)
- Curb weight: 1,735 kg (3,825 lb)

Chronology
- Predecessor: Renault Safrane
- Successor: Renault Latitude

The Renault Vel Satis is a five-passenger, five-door executive hatchback, manufactured and marketed by Renault from 2001 to 2009 over a single generation, sharing its platform with the Laguna II and Espace IV and manufactured on the same assembly line in Sandouville, France and noted for its unorthodox styling approach to the luxury segment. The Vel Satis, alongside the Opel Signum, aimed to capture a new market segment.

Launched at the 2001 Geneva Motor Show to replace the already discontinued Safrane, the Vel Satis followed a 1998 Paris Motor Show concept.

As Renault's flagship model, it was the company's first car offered with adaptive cruise control, Renault reportedly spent €550 million developing the Vel Satis, predicting 50,000 sales across Europe in its first year. In total, over an eight year production, approximately 62,000 were manufactured.

The name Vel Satis is a portmanteau of Velocity and Satisfaction.

== Overview ==
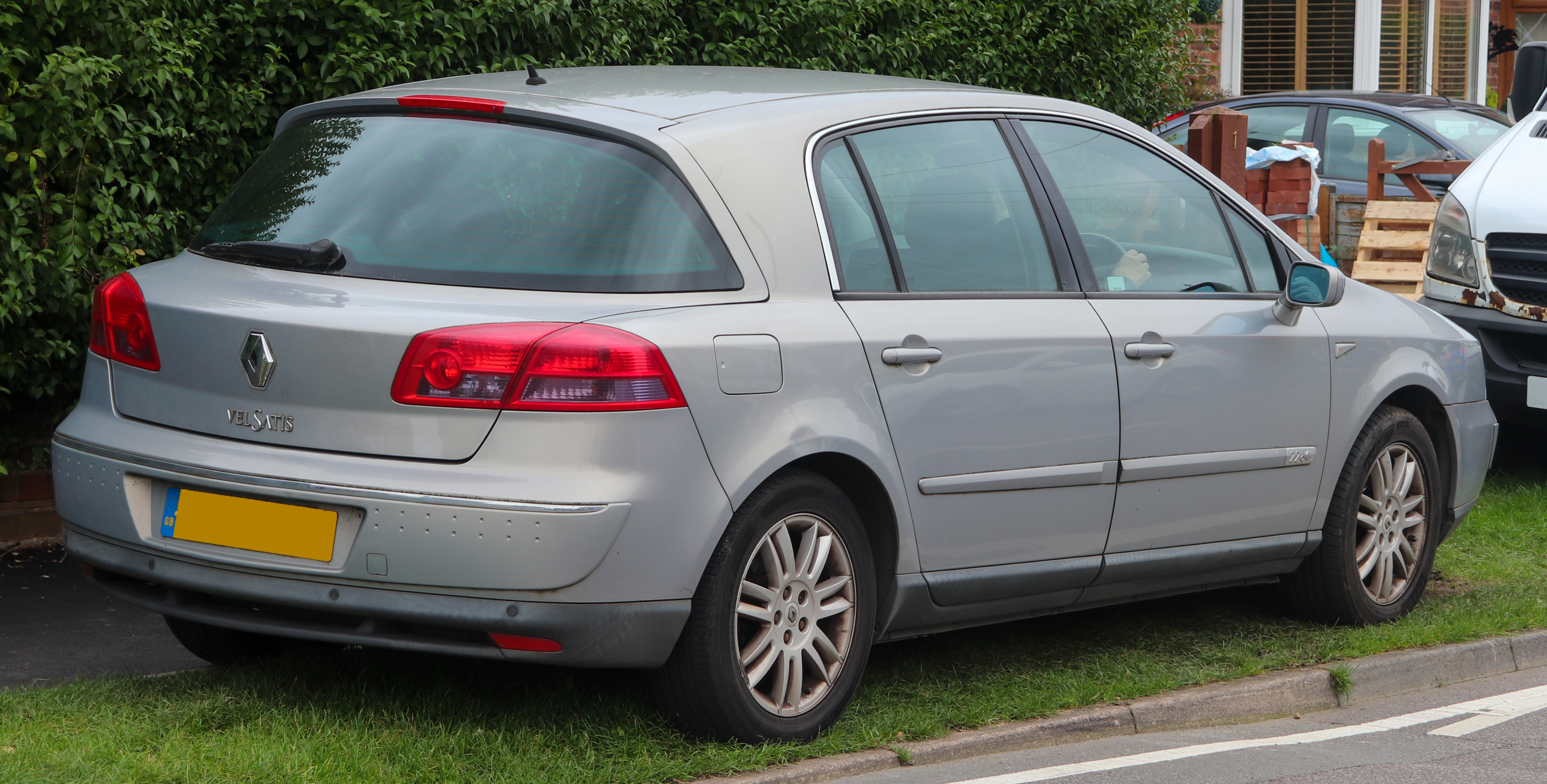
Rear view of Vel Satis (Pre-facelift)

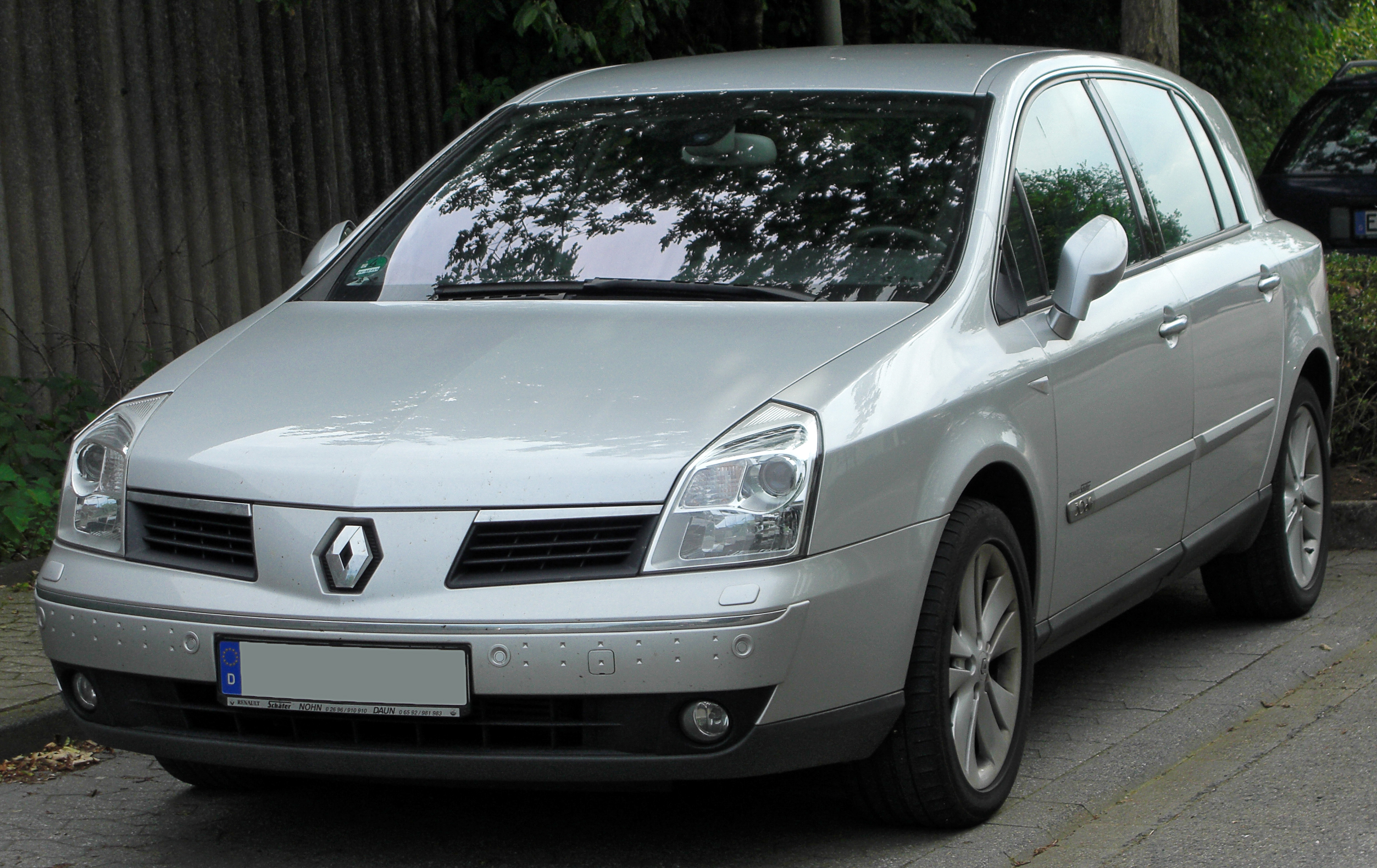

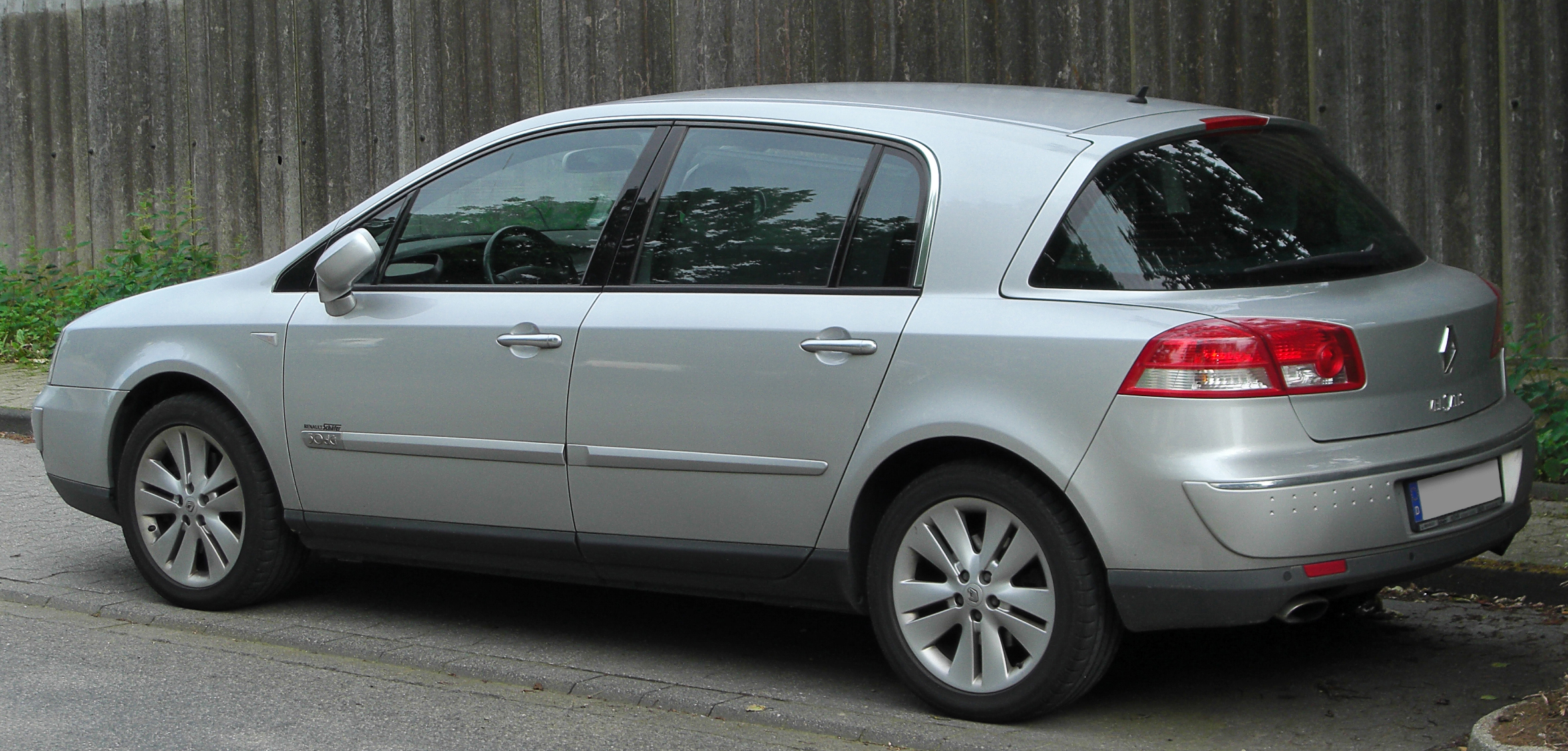
Renault Vel Satis (Post-facelift)

The Vel Satis is noted for its height (13 cm higher than a Safrane), benefiting interior space, and remains in use by high-ranking French officials. It was the second ever car to receive a five star Euro NCAP safety crash test rating, after the Laguna II.

Engine availability included:

- 2.0 T 16 valve 4-cylinder
- 3.5 24 valve V6-cylinder
- 2.0 dCi 16 valve 4-cylinder
- 2.2 dCi 16 valve 4-cylinder
- 3.0 dCi 24 valve V6-cylinder

The Vel Satis received a minor facelift for the 2005 model year, featuring a revised front grille, rear apron, twin-flow exhaust system, and chrome-plated door handles. The interior featured revised fittings, fabrics and materials and revised radio and navigation systems. The 2.0-liter petrol engine received an increase in output to 125 kW.

In March 2005, Renault UK decided not to develop a RHD version of the facelifted Vel Satis, as sales of the model had been poor in the United Kingdom since launch. Although 3,500 sales were predicted, only a third of these were achieved. This came two years after Renault discontinued the Avantime coupé/MPV.

On August 27, 2009, Renault ended production of the Vel Satis — losing an estimated €18,710 per vehicle produced.

== Reception ==
Patrick Le Quément, Renault's design chief, said the Vel Satis was intended to have physical presence, to redefine the prestige car on French terms, and to target less conformist customers.

In September 2002, Car described the Vel Satis as "ugly and very French."

Reviews of the car were critical of its ride and handling but noted the car was quiet under most conditions. "The gearbox is prone to considerable hunting in its quest to deliver power, at which point engine noise intrudes more than anticipated, and the change itself is by no means the smoothest in the class." The ride quality was described as feeling "over tough at pottering speeds, but displays a tendency to disintegrate into chop and judder when confronted with anything other than the smoothest of surfaces."

== See also ==
- Opel Signum
- List of Renault vehicles
- Renault Mégane
- Renault Laguna
- Renault Espace
- Renault Avantime
