= Renault G-Type engine =

G-Type engine

Overview
- Manufacturer: Renault
- Also called: 2.2 d/dT/dTi/dCi (GxT); 2.5 dTi/dCi/DTI/CDTI (GxU)
- Production: 1993–2011

Layout
- Configuration: I4
- Displacement: 2.2 L; 133.5 cu in (2,188 cc) (GxT); 2.5 L; 150.4 cu in (2,464 cc) (GxU)
- Cylinder bore: 87 mm (3.43 in) (GxT); 89 mm (3.5 in) (GxU)
- Piston stroke: 92 mm (3.62 in) (GxT); 99 mm (3.90 in) (GxU)
- Valvetrain: SOHC 3 valves x cyl. (G8T); DOHC 4 valves x cyl. (G9T and G9U)
- Compression ratio: 23.0:1 (non-turbo G8T); 22.0:1 (turbo G8T); 18.0:1 (G9T); 17.1:1 (G9U)

Combustion
- Turbocharger: No (some versions of G8T); Yes (all others)
- Fuel system: Indirect injection (G8T); Common rail direct injection (G9T and G9U)
- Fuel type: Diesel
- Cooling system: Water-cooled

Output
- Power output: 83–150 PS (61–110 kW)
- Torque output: 142–327 N⋅m (105–241 lb⋅ft)

Chronology
- Predecessor: Douvrin engine (GxT); Sofim 8140 engine (GxT and GxU)
- Successor: Renault M9R engine

The Renault G-Type was a family of naturally aspirated and turbocharged straight-four indirect injection and common rail injection diesel engines. They feature an iron block and aluminum head. The engines were in production for nearly two decades, with improvements in power and torque output and fuel efficiency.

== Summary ==
Models
Engine code	Displacement	Power/rpm	Torque/rpm	Year
G8T	2.2 L (2,188 cc)	83 PS (61 kW; 82 hp)/4500	142 N⋅m (105 lb⋅ft)/2250	1994
G9T	2.2 L (2,188 cc)	90 PS (66 kW; 89 hp)/3650	260 N⋅m (192 lb⋅ft)/1500	2003
G8T	2.2 L (2,188 cc)	113 PS (83 kW; 111 hp)/4300	250 N⋅m (184 lb⋅ft)/2000	1996
G9U	2.5 L (2,464 cc)	114 PS (84 kW; 112 hp)/3500	290 N⋅m (214 lb⋅ft)/1600	2006
G9T	2.2 L (2,188 cc)	115 PS (85 kW; 113 hp)/4000	296 N⋅m (218 lb⋅ft)/1750	2001
G9T	2.2 L (2,188 cc)	130 PS (96 kW; 128 hp)/4000	296 N⋅m (218 lb⋅ft)/1750	2001
G9U	2.5 L (2,464 cc)	133 PS (98 kW; 131 hp)/3500	310 N⋅m (229 lb⋅ft)/2100	2001
G9U	2.5 L (2,464 cc)	145 PS (107 kW; 143 hp)/3500	310 N⋅m (229 lb⋅ft)/2100	2006
G9T	2.2 L (2,188 cc)	150 PS (110 kW; 148 hp)/4000	320 N⋅m (236 lb⋅ft)/1750	2002
G9T	2.2 L (2,188 cc)	150 PS (110 kW; 148 hp)/4000	327 N⋅m (241 lb⋅ft)/1750	2002

== GxT ==
Applications:

- G8T
  - 1996–2000 Renault Safrane
  - 1994–2001 Renault Laguna I
  - 1996–2001 Renault Espace III
- G9T
  - 2001–2015 Renault Espace IV
  - 2001–2009 Renault Vel Satis
  - 2001–2003 Renault Avantime
  - 2002–2006 Renault Laguna II
  - 1999–2003 Renault Master II/Nissan Interstar/Opel Movano I/Vauxhall Movano I

== GxU ==
Applications:

- G9U
  - 1999–2003 Renault Master II/Nissan Interstar/Opel Movano I/Vauxhall Movano I
  - 2001–2011 Renault Trafic II/Nissan Primastar/Opel Vivaro/Vauxhall Vivaro

== See also ==
- List of Renault engines
