= Sandouville Renault Factory =

Usine Renault de Sandouville SNC (Sandouville Renault Factory)
- Built: 1964
- Location: Route Alizés, 76430 Sandouville, France; Sandouville, France
- Coordinates: 49.484799°N 0.296495°E
- Industry: Automotive
- Area: 237 ha (590 acres)

The Sandouville Renault Factory is a car plant belonging to the Renault Group, established in 1964 at Sandouville in the Seine-Maritime department, not far from the port of Le Havre. Work began on its construction in July 1963 and the factory was in most respects completed by December 1964.

== History ==
Initially it was constructed for the assembly of the Renault 16 which was formally launched in March 1965 at the Geneva Motor Show, but not available for sale, even in its home market, till June 1965. Initially the plant, which enjoyed excellent communication links, notably by rail and river, focused on final assembly, while most of the sub-assemblies and other components arrived from older Renault plants located along the River Seine between Le Havre and Paris. For the early Renault 16s running gear and suspension sub-assemblies came from the company's old Billancourt factory. Also on the banks of the Seine is Cléon from where another Renault plant supplied Sandouville with power trains. Flins supplied Sandouville with stampings and chromed components.

Subsequent models built at Sandouville include the Renault 17, Renault 20, Renault 30, Renault 18, Renault 21, Renault 25, Renault Safrane, Renault Laguna and Renault Vel Satis, meaning that of the three major Renault plants in France, this was the one that concentrated on the larger models. Since 2003, when the Renault Espace switched from a composite body shell (manufactured on Renault's behalf by Matra) to a more conventional pressed steel body shell, the Espace has also been manufactured at Sandouville.

At its peak, the plant employed 12,000 people, but by 2006 this had fallen to just 4,650. Since the Second World War Renault traditionally concentrated on smaller cars, and many of the company's mid-sized and larger models have encountered difficulty establishing significant market share against competitor offerings. Employees looked to the Renault Laguna III, launched at the end of 2007, for an upturn in their prospects. Le Monde on 30 September 2006 reported Renault as saying that if the Laguna III, intended to revive Sandouville's fortunes, failed to take off in the market place, there would be [adverse] consequences for a site currently operating at only 40% of its design capacity.

The new Laguna was not an instant hit with customers, and in July 2008 Renault announced that one of the two work teams would be cancelled, which would involve about 1,000 of the workforce.

As of 2024 the Sandouville plant is producing the following models:

- Renault Trafic
- Nissan Primastar
- Renault Trucks Trafic Red
