= Sandouville =

- Commune
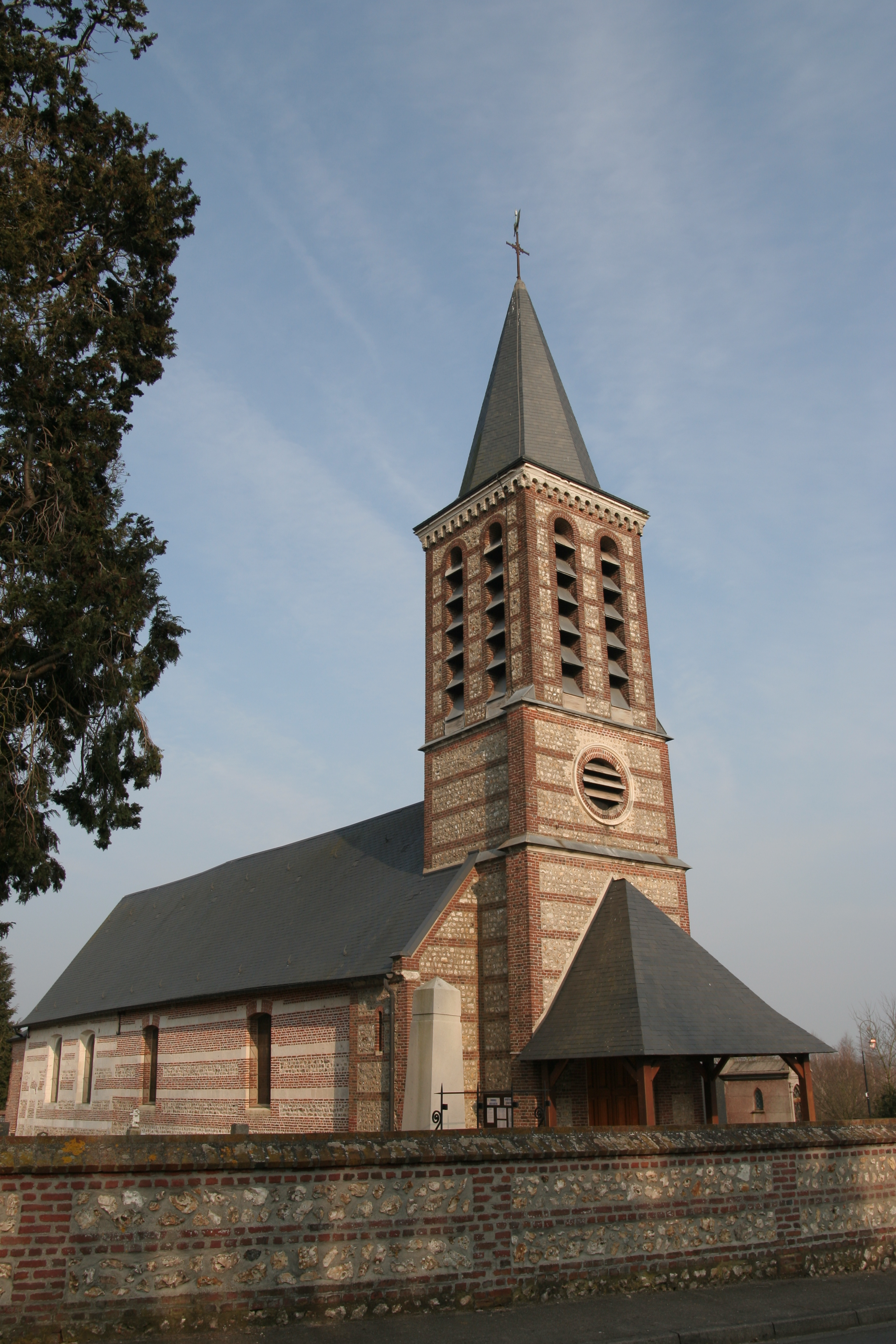
- The church in Sandouville

- Coat of arms
- Location of Sandouville
- Location within France Location within Normandy
- Coordinates: 49°29′52″N 0°19′12″E
- Country: France
- Region: Normandy
- Department: Seine-Maritime
- Arrondissement: Le Havre
- Canton: Saint-Romain-de-Colbosc
- Intercommunality: Le Havre Seine Métropole

Government
  - Mayor (2026–32): Jacques Dellerie
- Area^{1}: 14.8 km^{2} (5.7 sq mi)
- Elevation: 96 m (315 ft)
- Highest elevation: 108 m (354 ft)
- Lowest elevation: 0 m (0 ft)
- Population (2023): 799
  - Density: 54.0/km^{2} (140/sq mi)
- Time zone: UTC+01:00 (CET)
  - Summer (DST): UTC+02:00 (CEST)
- INSEE/Postal code: 76660 /76430
- ^{1} French Land Register data, which excludes lakes, ponds, glaciers > 1 km^{2} (0.386 sq mi or 247 acres) and river estuaries.

Sandouville (French pronunciation: [sɑ̃duvil]) is a commune in the Seine-Maritime département in the Normandy region in northern France.

== Geography ==
A farming and light industrial village, by the banks of the Seine, in the Pays de Caux, situated some 11 miles (18 km) east of Le Havre, at the junction of the D80 and D982 roads. The commune has two distinct parts: the north contains the village, farms and woodland, the south, separated by the A131 autoroute and the canal de Tancarville, has some port activity, a Renault factory and reclaimed marshland.

== Heraldry ==
Arms of Sandouville	The arms of Sandouville are blazoned : Gules, a toothed wheel Or, and on a chief argent 3 martlets sable.

== Population ==
Historical population
Year	Pop.	±% p.a.
1968	460	—
1975	566	+3.01%
1982	645	+1.88%
1990	703	+1.08%
1999	754	+0.78%
2007	769	+0.25%
2012	804	+0.89%
2017	801	−0.07%
2023	799	−0.04%
Source: INSEE

== Places of interest ==
- The Pont de Normandie (1995), the cable-stayed bridge over the Seine
- The church of St. Aubin, dating from the twelfth century

== See also ==
- Communes of the Seine-Maritime department
