= Nissan X-Trail =

Compact crossover SUV

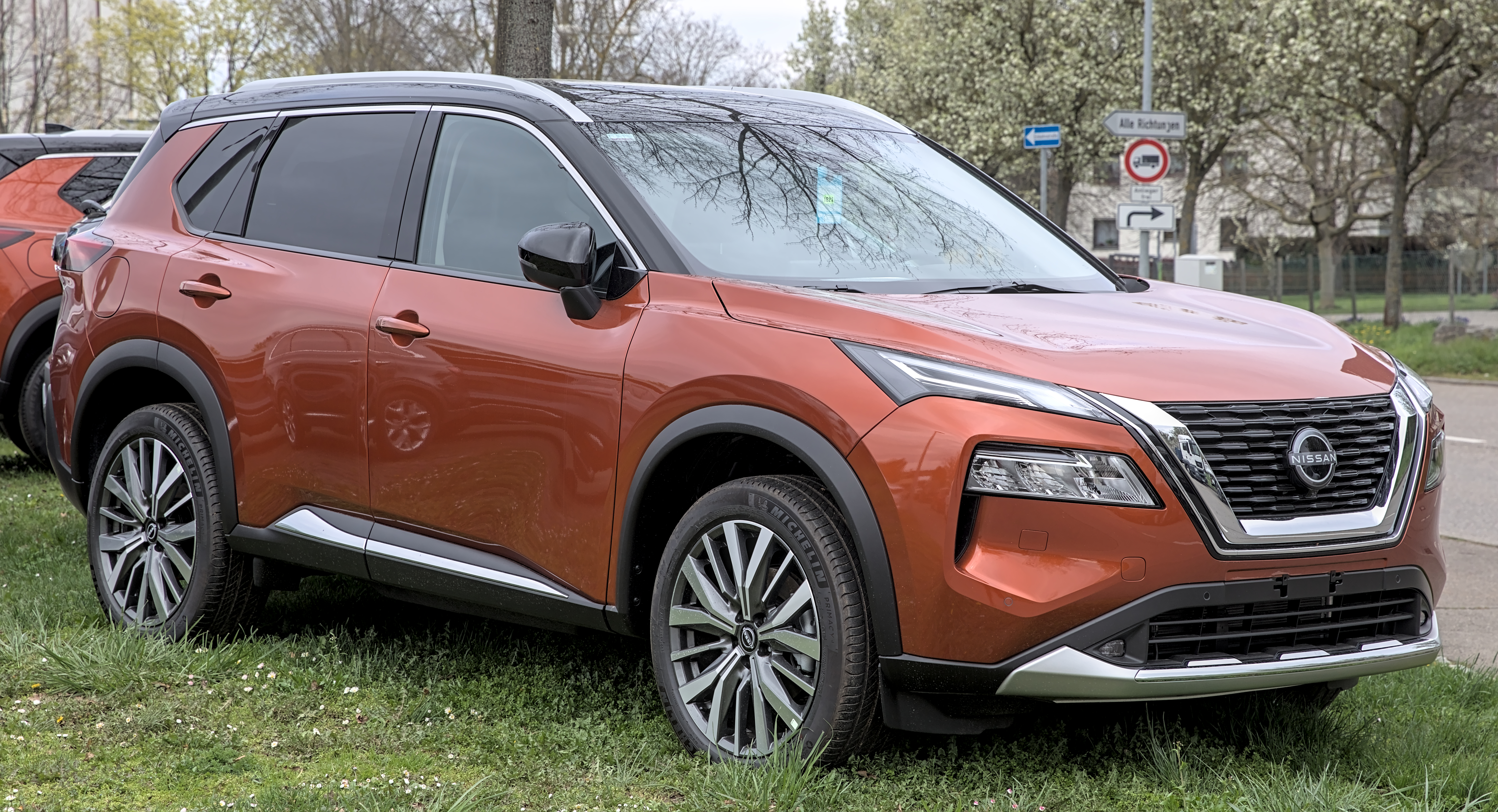

Overview
- Manufacturer: Nissan
- Also called: Nissan Rogue (2013–present)
- Production: 2000–present

Body and chassis
- Class: Compact crossover SUV
- Body style: 5-door SUV
- Layout: Front-engine, front-wheel-drive or four-wheel-drive
- Chassis: Unibody

Chronology
- Predecessor: Nissan Rasheen; Nissan Terrano II

The Nissan X-Trail (Japanese: 日産・エクストレイル, Hepburn: Nissan Ekusutoreiru) is a compact crossover SUV produced by the Japanese automaker Nissan since 2000, replacing the Rasheen and Terrano II. Since 2018, it is positioned between the Qashqai and the larger Murano.

Since the third-generation model, the X-Trail became the same vehicle as the Rogue sold in the United States and Canada. Also for the first time since the third-generation model, the X-Trail became available with third-row seating as an option (however the third-row seating option is not available on the Rogue version sold exclusively in the US and Canada). It also marked a departure in terms of design from a rugged boxy look to a more urban-oriented crossover SUV design. The fourth-generation model, launched for 2021, introduced an e-Power series hybrid powertrain option.

== First generation (T30; 2000) ==
First generation
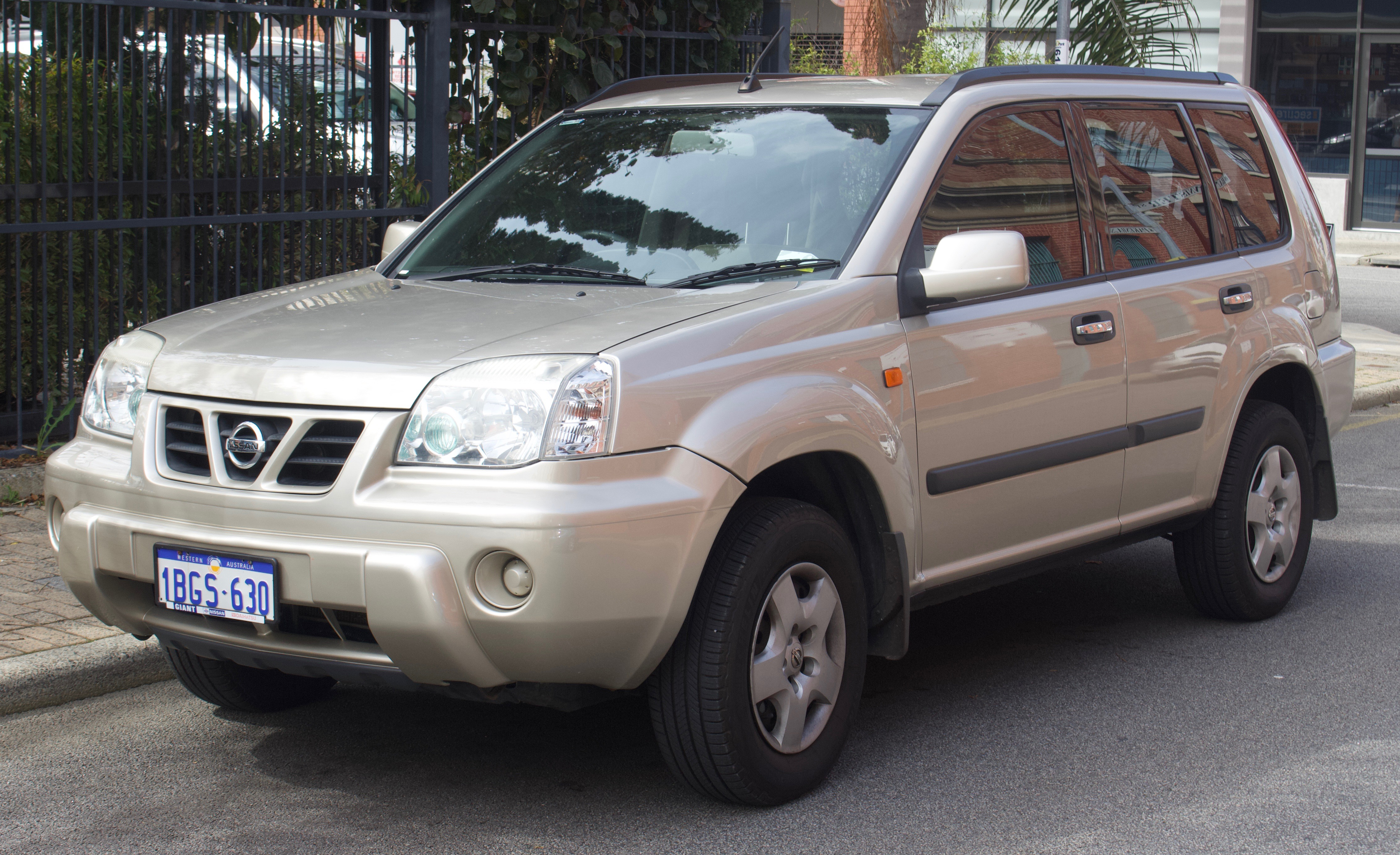
- Nissan X-Trail ST (Australia; pre-facelift)

Overview
- Model code: T30
- Production: October 2000 – 2007 (Japan); 2001–2008 (Thailand); 2002–2007 (Taiwan); 2003–2008 (Indonesia); 2003–2010 (Malaysia); 2003–2014 (Philippines)
- Assembly: Japan: Kanda, Fukuoka (Nissan Motor Kyushu); Indonesia: Purwakarta (NMI); Malaysia: Kuala Lumpur (TCMA); Philippines: Santa Rosa City; Thailand: Samut Prakan; Taiwan: Miaoli (Yulon)

Body and chassis
- Platform: Nissan MS/M&S/FF-S platform
- Related: Nissan Primera; Nissan Almera; Nissan Sentra

Powertrain
- Engine: Petrol: 2.0 L QR20DE I4 (T30); 2.0 L SR20VET turbo I4 (PT30); 2.5 L QR25DE I4 (BT30); Diesel: 2.2 L YD22DDT I4; 2.2 L YD22DDTi I4 (ET30)
- Transmission: 4-speed automatic; 5-speed manual; 6-speed manual

Dimensions
- Wheelbase: 2,619–2,625 mm (103.1–103.3 in)
- Length: 4,455–4,509 mm (175.4–177.5 in)
- Width: 1,760–1,765 mm (69.3–69.5 in)
- Height: 1,675–1,679 mm (65.9–66.1 in)

The T30 series X-Trail was unveiled at the September 2000 Paris Motor Show. It uses the Nissan MS/M&S/FF-S platform, shared with the Almera and the Primera. It entered production in October 2000, with sales in Japan commenced in November.

In the United Kingdom and Australia, the X-Trail was launched in October 2001. In June 2003, Nissan gave the car an interior and exterior facelift, while also upgrading the 2.2-litre turbo-diesels with a variable turbocharger (2.2 DCi rather than the earlier 2.2 Di), producing 136 PS (100 kW; 134 hp) instead of the original 114 PS (84 kW; 112 hp). The external differences were slight, although the grille and the bumpers were redesigned and the Nissan logo was updated to the latest design.

The X-Trail's All-Mode 4x4 transmission transfer case enables the driver to select between 2WD, 4WD or 4WD Lock through an electronic switch on the dashboard. Nissan offered a hydrogen fuel cell model named the X-Trail FCV on lease to businesses. It was unveiled at the 60th Frankfurt Motor Show in September 2003, followed by the 37th Tokyo Motor Show in the following month.

While not marketed in the U.S., the X-Trail was sold in Canada for model years 2005 and 2006, and in Mexico since 2003.

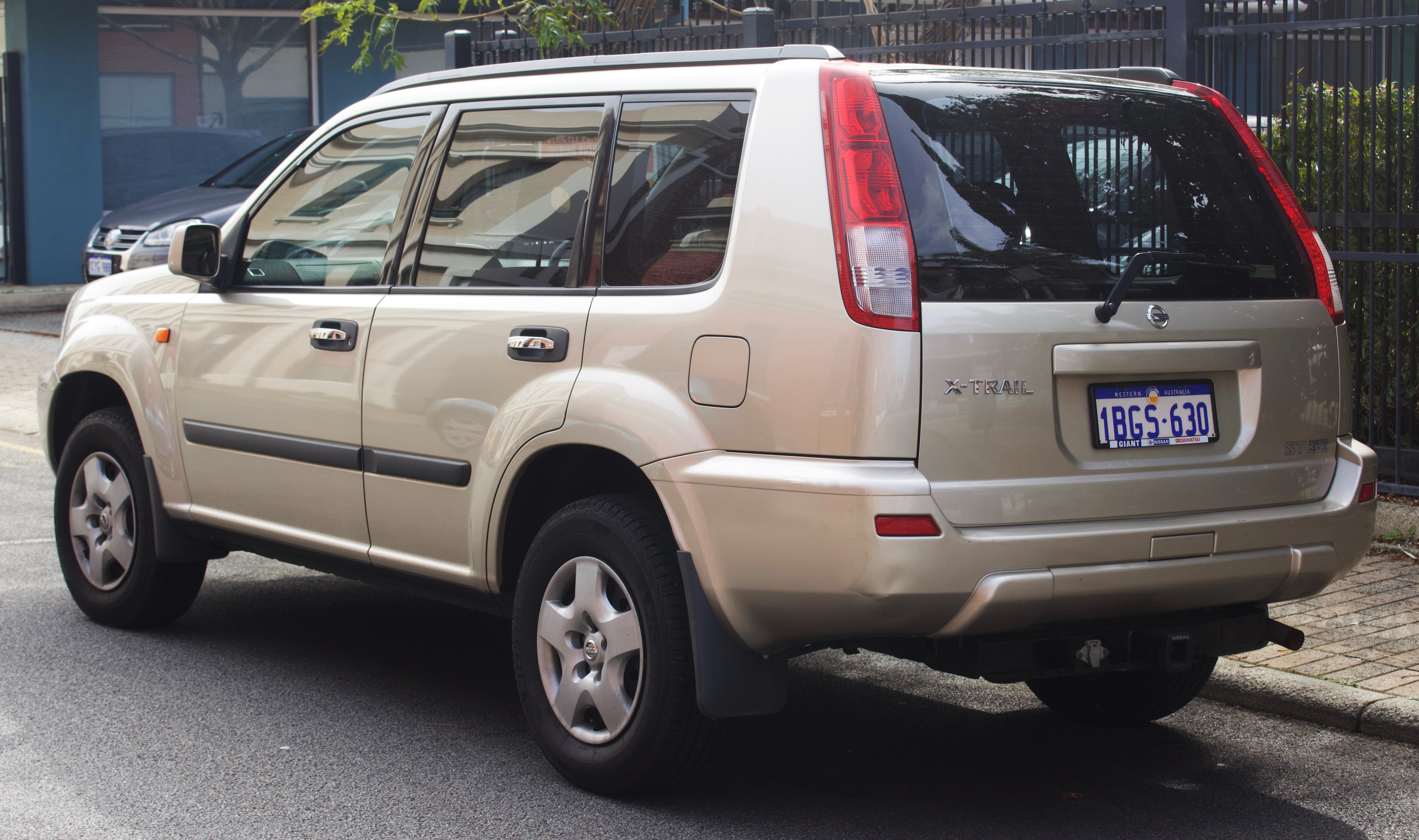
Rear view (pre-facelift)

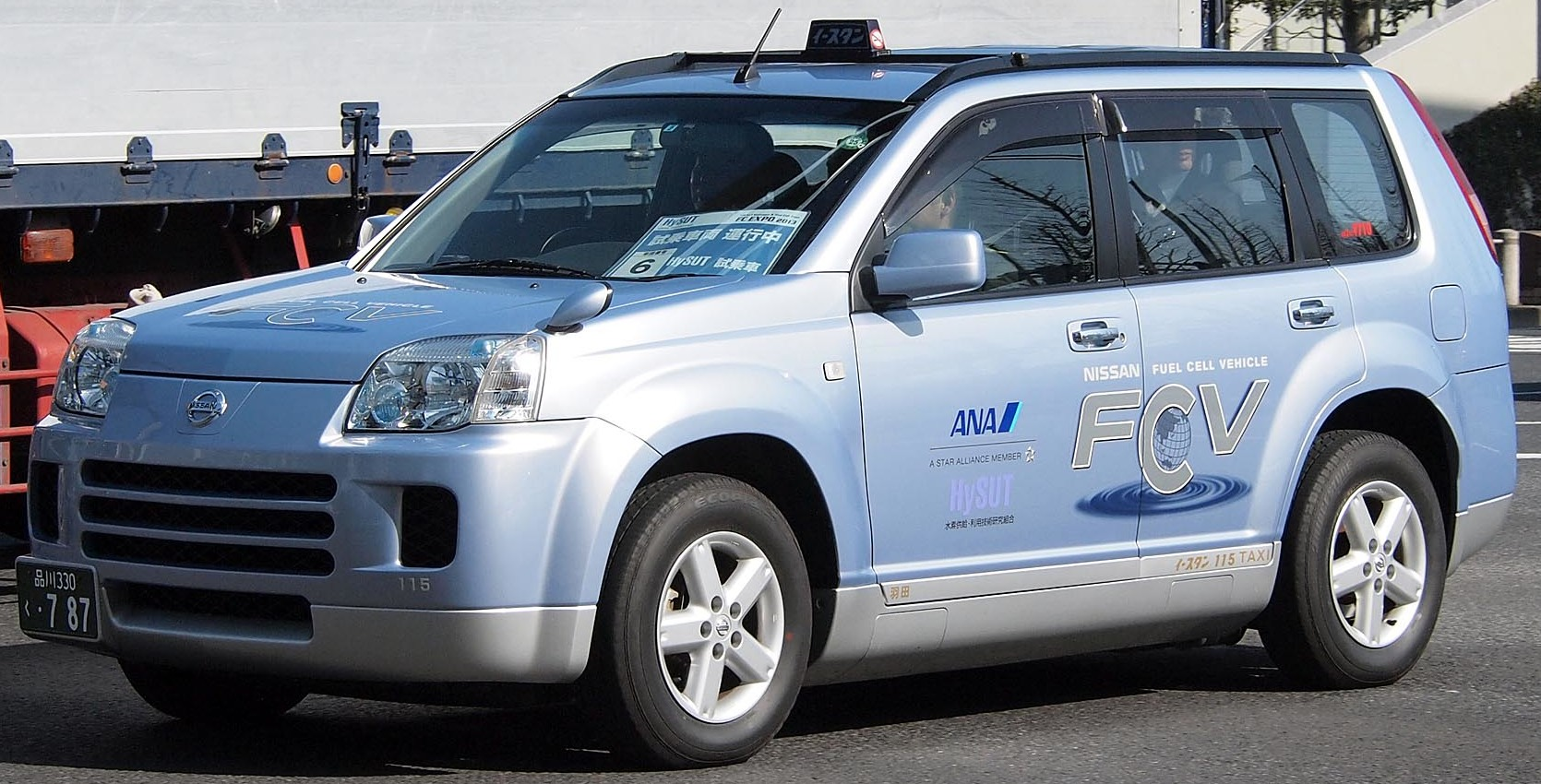
Nissan X-Trail FCV

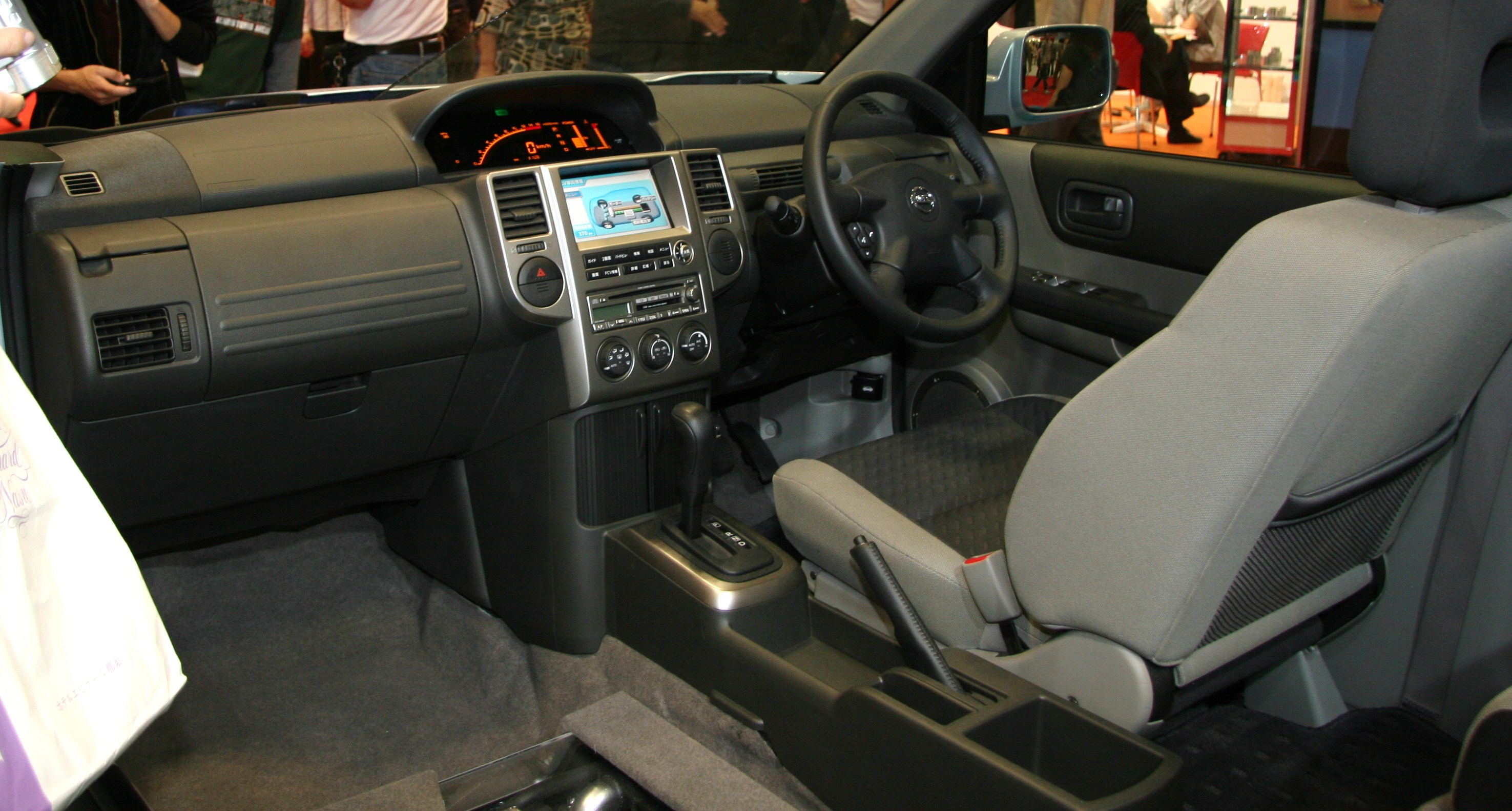
Nissan X-Trail FCV interior

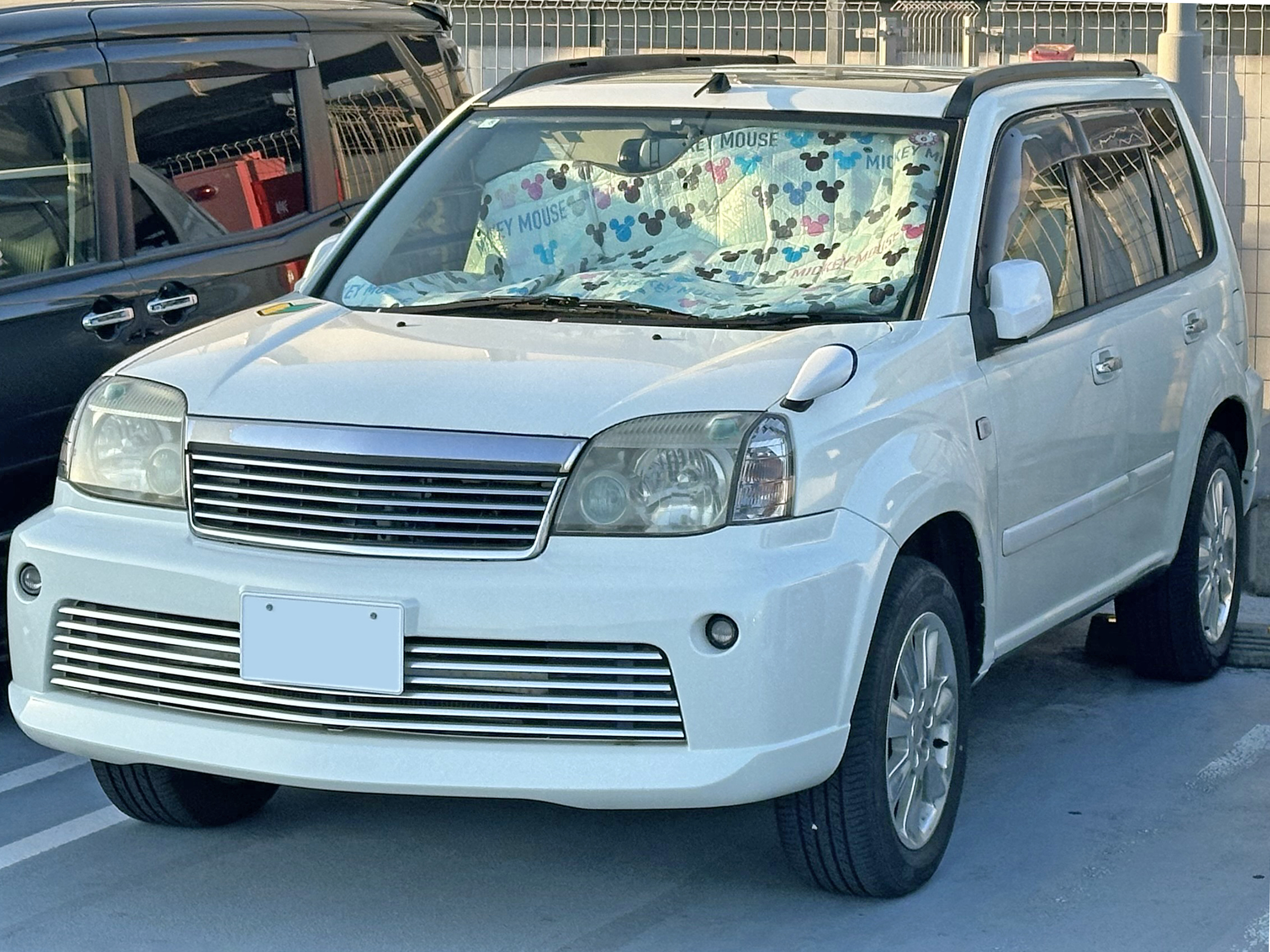
Nissan X-Trail Rider

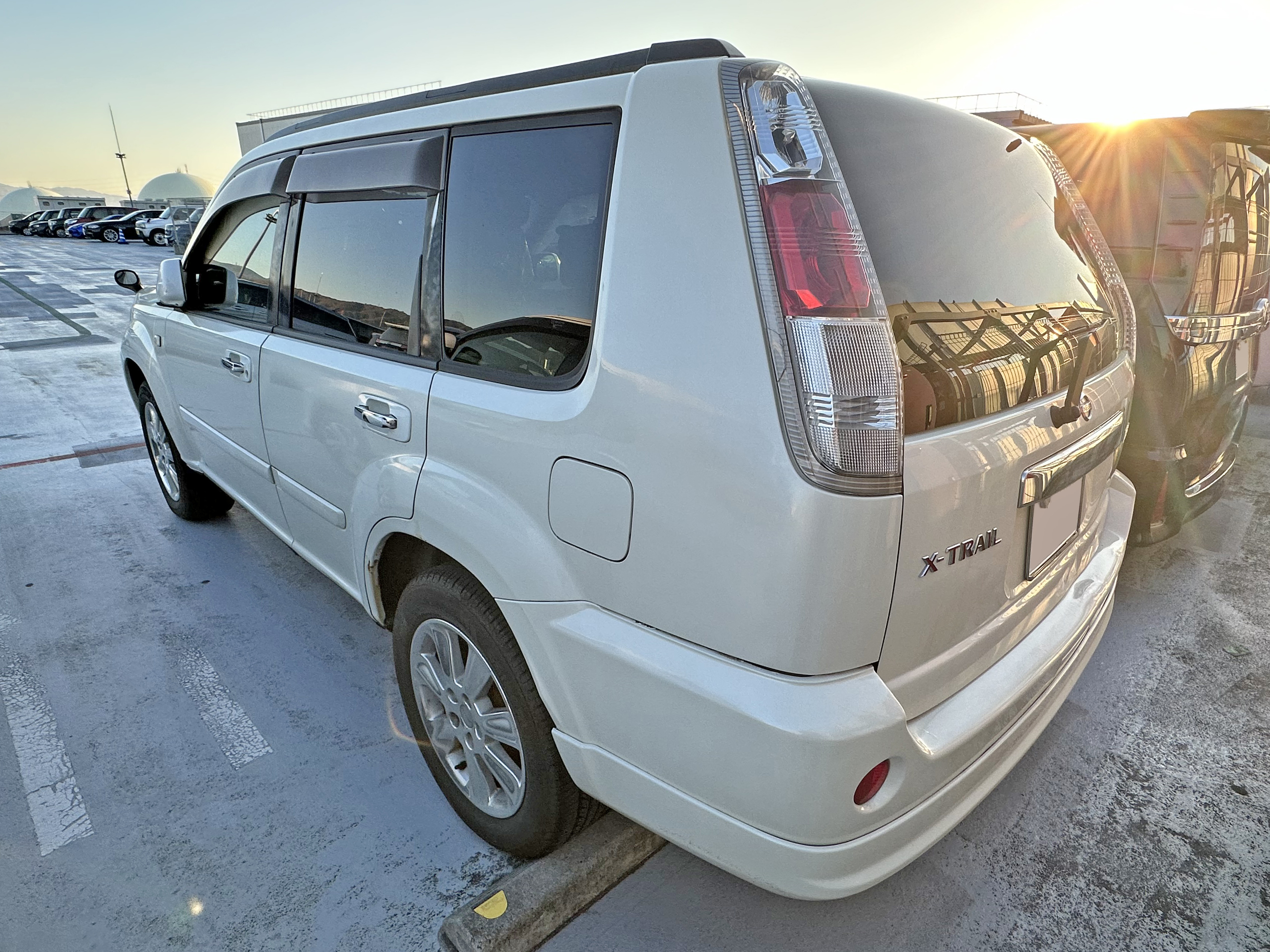
Nissan X-Trail Rider (Rear view)

=== Markets ===
==== Japan ====
In Japan, the X-Trail was equipped with the QR20DE petrol engine, which produces 140 PS (103 kW), and the SR20VET petrol turbocharged engine, which produces 280 PS (206 kW).

In February 2001, Nissan launched a special edition AWD X-Trail equipped with the SR20VET petrol turbocharged engine. Named the X-Trail GT, it was offered only in Japan. This was the first SR20 Nissan ever produced which paired their famous high-flowing VE head (Variable Valve Lift - "VVL") with a turbo ("DET" internals also), in a transverse engine mounting configuration with AWD. It was only offered with a 4-speed automatic transmission and four-wheel-drive, model code is PNT30. The X-Trail GT has restyled grille and larger front bumper design, which was later used on the international market X-Trail.

On 1 October 2001, the St and Xt grades were added, followed by Stt and Xtt grades in October 2002.

The facelifted X-Trail was released in Japan on 9 June 2003.

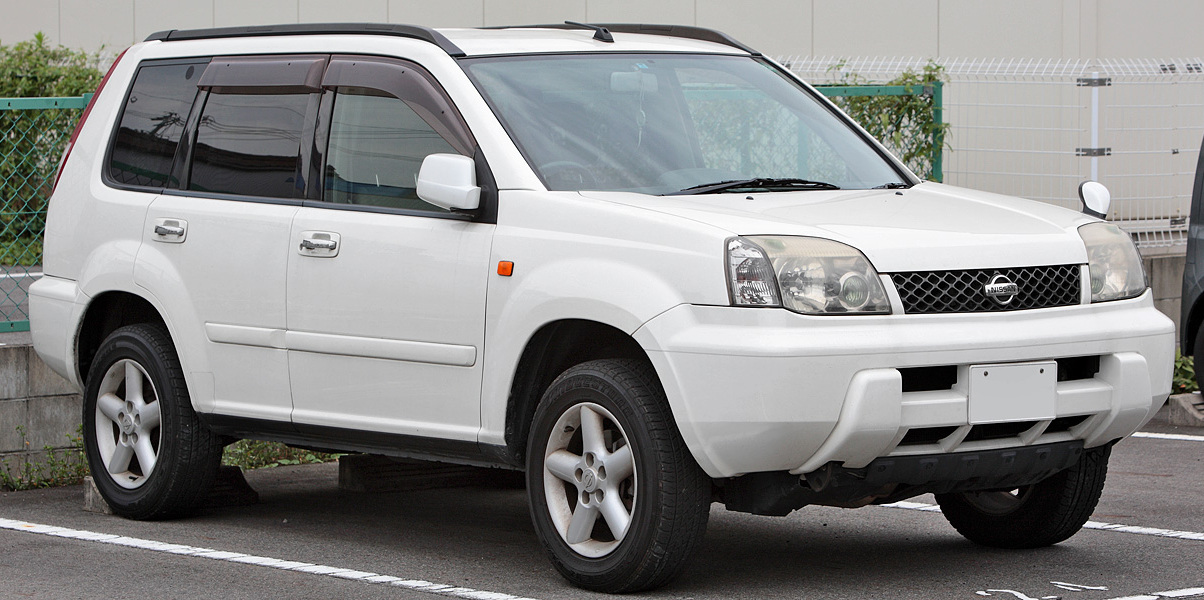
Nissan X-Trail (Japan; pre-facelift)

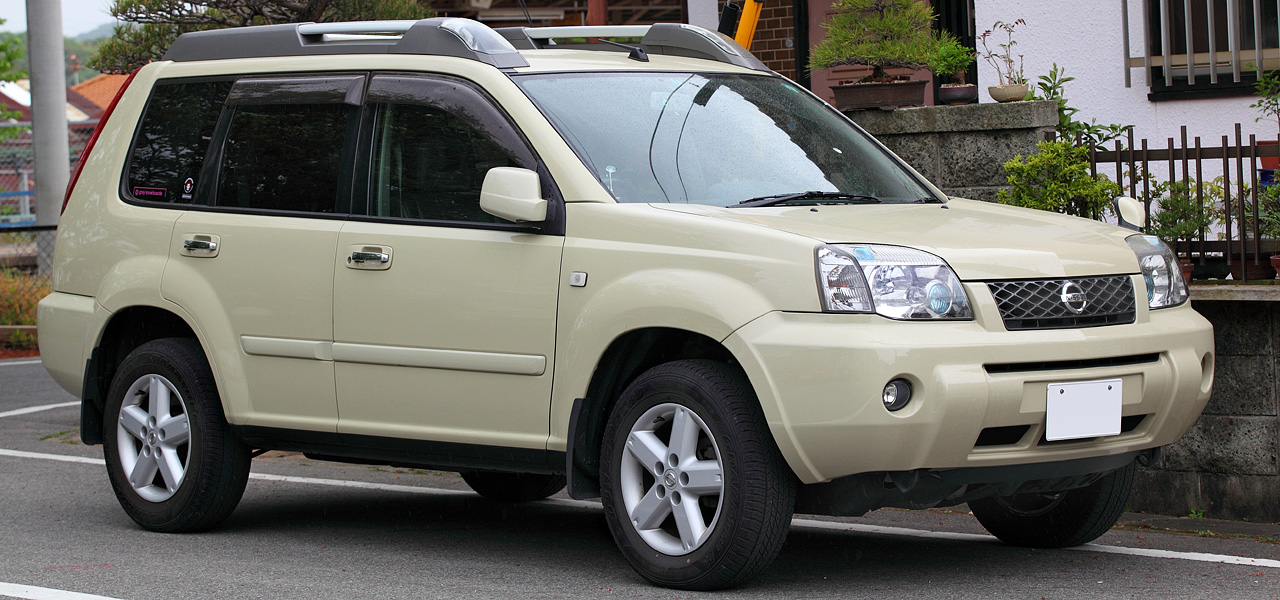
Nissan X-Trail (Japan; facelift)

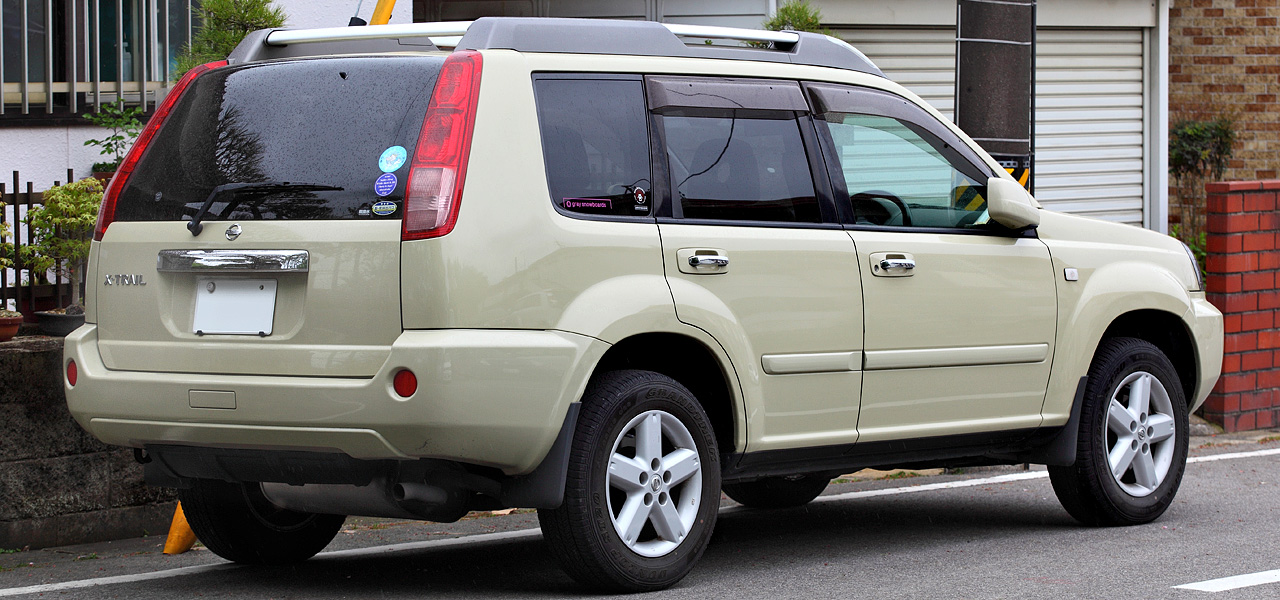
Nissan X-Trail (Japan; facelift) (Rear view)

==== United Kingdom ====
In the United Kingdom, the first generation X-Trail was available in S, Sport and SE+ trim levels between launch and 2004. All models were equipped with full electric windows, electrically adjustable door mirrors (on SVE and T-Spec they were electrically folding also), climate control, single CD player, four airbags and remote central locking. There was also a Fat Face special edition in 2005, only for the United Kingdom, which was based on the Sports. They made 1,998 of them to celebrate the year Fat Face was set up. The trim levels were then revised to SE, Sport, SVE and T-Spec.

By 2006, Nissan had narrowed and revised the trim line up to just three variants, SE, Columbia, and top-grade Aventura equipped with heated and electrically operated front seats, leather upholstery, satellite navigation, and xenon headlights.

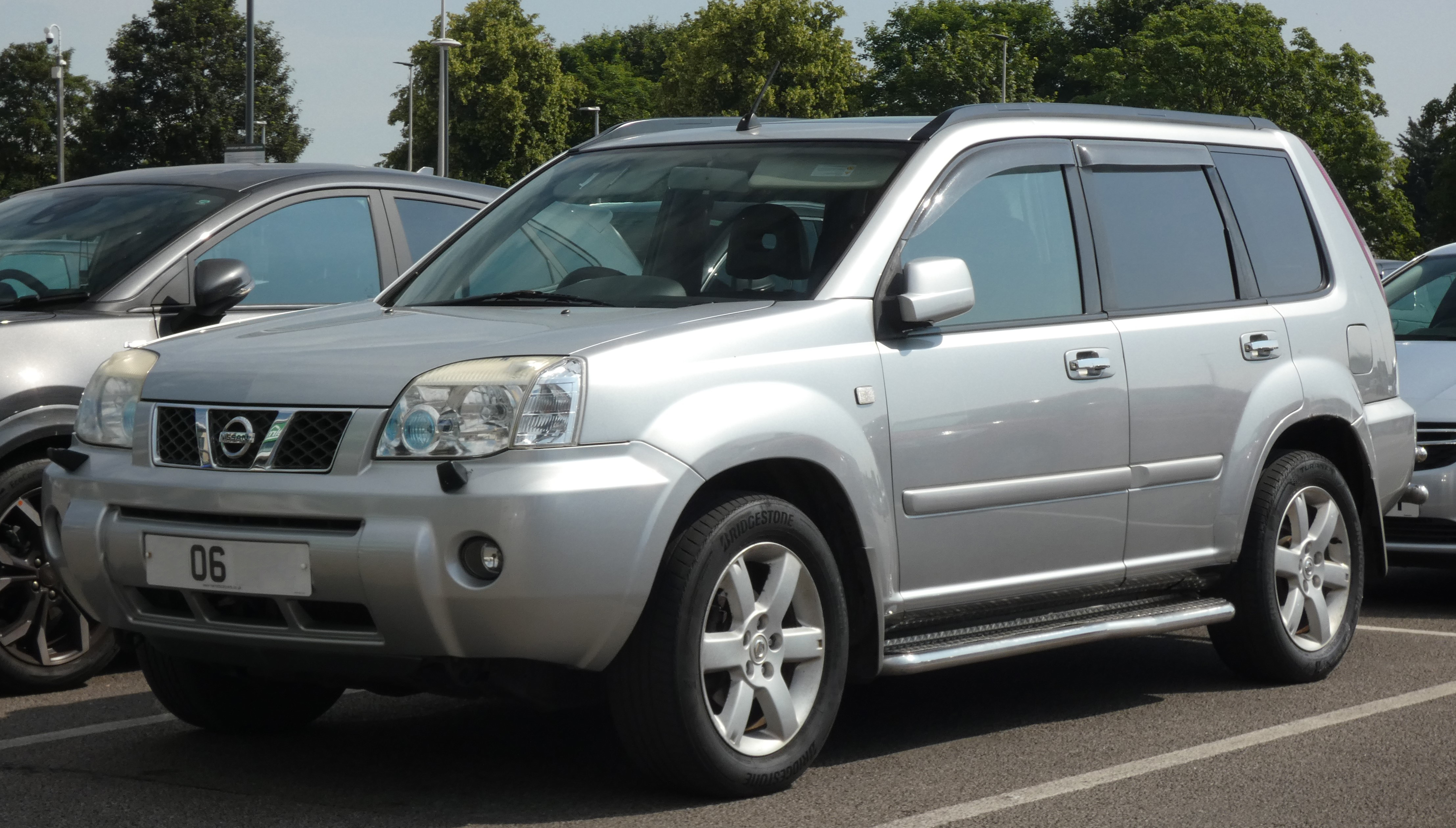
Nissan X-Trail Aventura (UK; Facelift)

==== Australia ====
In Australia, the X-Trail was available in standard ST, mid spec ST-S, high spec Ti and luxury spec Ti-L, with limited editions ST-X, ST-R, ST-S 40th anniversary models. All models were equipped with full electric windows, electric mirrors (electric folding on Ti-L), single CD player, two airbags and remote central locking. ST-S adds ST on sunroof and 16" alloy wheels. Ti adds ST on climate control, six disk CD player, fog lamps and 16-inch alloy wheels, and Ti-L adds Ti on leather and electric seats, sunroof, and optional DVD player. Limited edition ST-R adds ST on light emitting roof racks, with ST-S 40th Anniversary adding fog lamps to original ST-S.

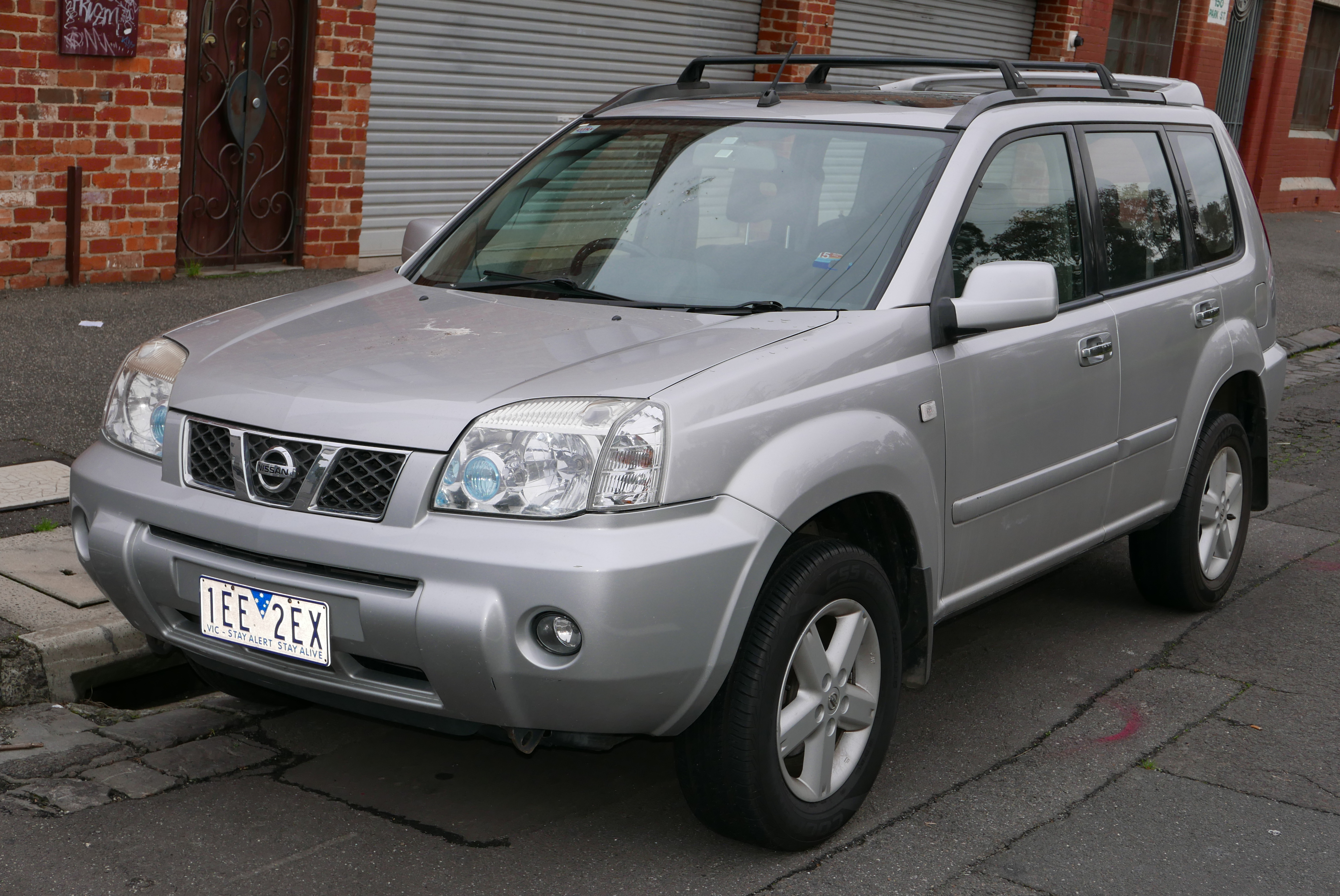
Nissan X-Trail (Australia; facelift)

==== Taiwan ====
In 2003, Taiwanese Nissan distributor Yulon launched the Nissan X-Trail with a major design difference in the front end compared to the international version to fit the taste of the Taiwanese market. The design was done by Yulon Asia Technical Center under Yulon-Nissan Motors. The model was sold until 2006, when it received a minor facelift with new front bumper, grilles, headlamps, and LED tail lamps.

Due to the late facelift, Yulon-Nissan skipped the second generation X-Trail and continued the production of the facelifted Taiwanese Nissan X-Trail until 2008 and was replaced by the American imported first-generation Rogue. The X-Trail nameplate did not return until 2015 when the third generation Nissan X-Trail returned and continued to be domestically produced in Taiwan.

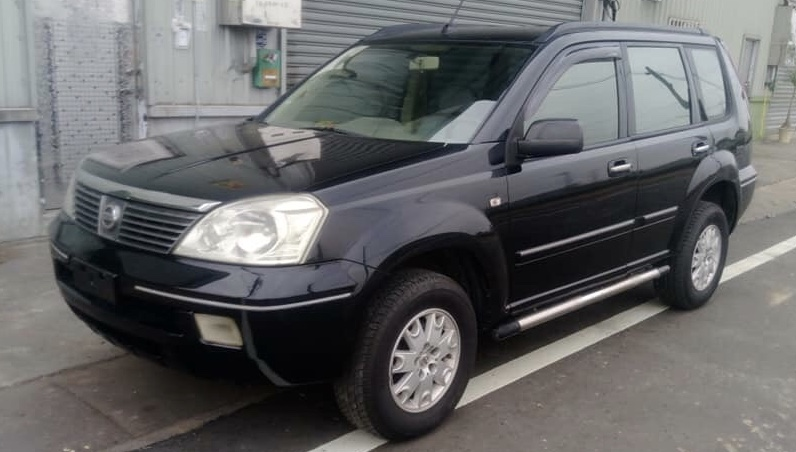
Nissan X-Trail (Taiwan; pre-facelift)

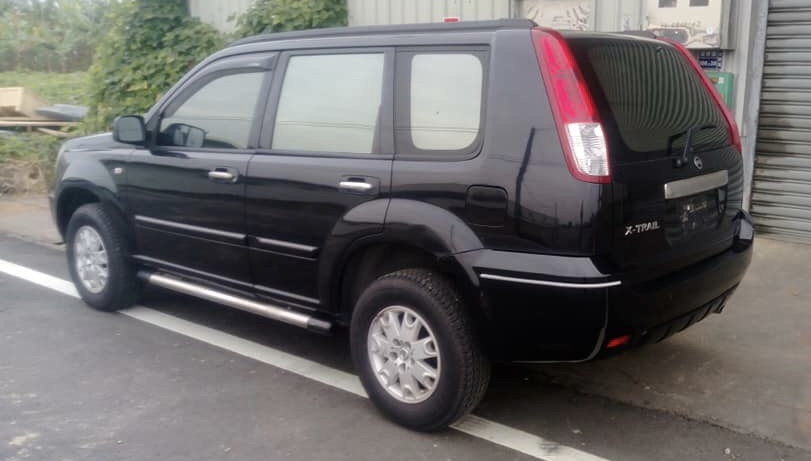
Nissan X-Trail (Taiwan; pre-facelift) (Rear view)

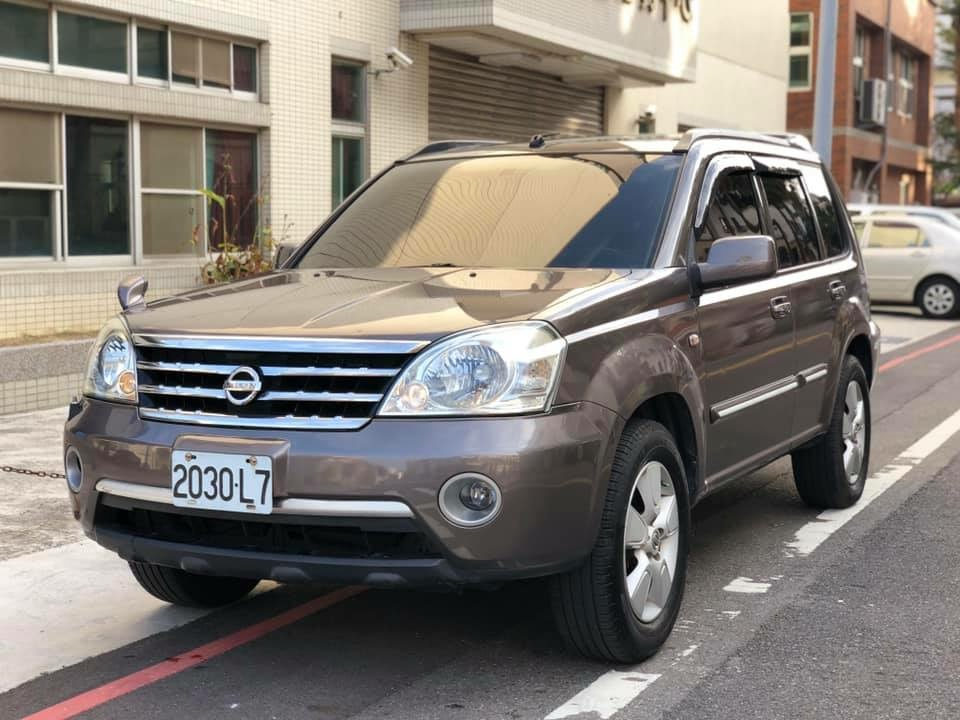
Nissan X-Trail (Taiwan; facelift)

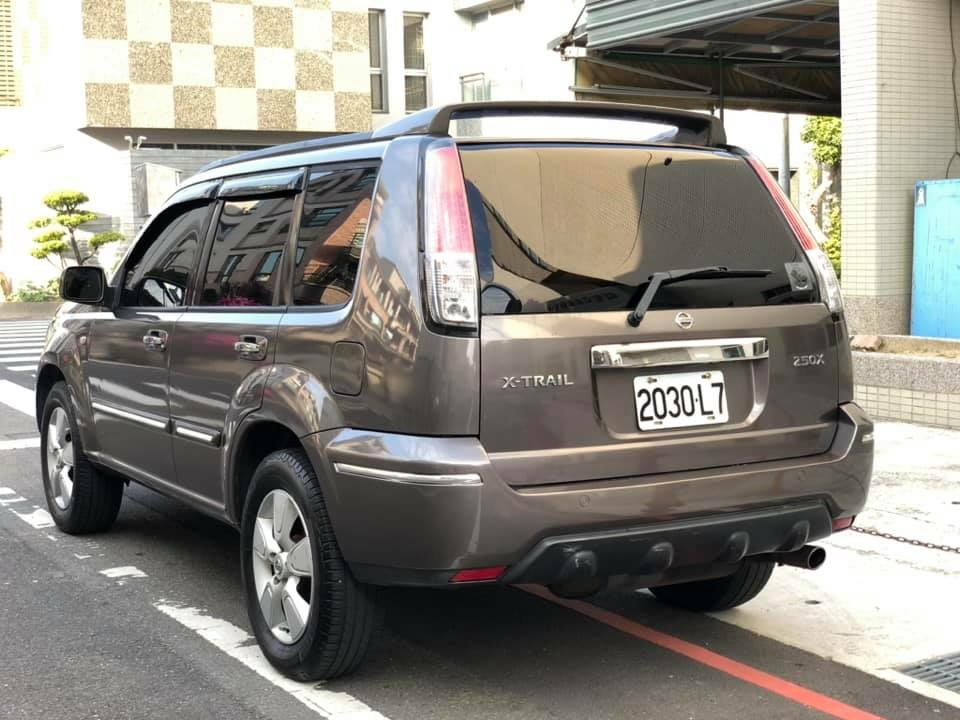
Nissan X-Trail (Taiwan; facelift) (Rear view)

==== Philippines ====
In the Philippines, Nissan Motors launched the X-Trail in 2003. The only available trim that time was the "200X". It is powered by Nissan's 2.0L QR20DE inline-four engine mated to a 4-speed automatic transmission. It featured fabric upholstery, remote keyless entry, a roof rail, 2DIN 6 CD with 4 speakers audio system, immobilizer, & collapsible steering column.

By 2004, Nissan introduced an all-new trim the "250X". The "250X" is became powered by Nissan's 2.5L QR25DE engine mated to a standard 4-speed automatic transmission. It received redesigned 16-inch rims, baby fender mirror, rear spoiler (4x2 variant only), MP3 ready with 6 speaker audio system, angel-eye foglights, among other features.

In 2007, Nissan introduced another new trim the "Tokyo Edition 250X". It is powered by the same 2.0L QR20DE became equipped with CVTC paired to a standard 4-speed automatic transmission. It came with redesigned interior and grille, new colour options, chrome door handles, Kenwood MP3 ready audio system, leather seats, automatic climate control and unique body stripes.

The T30 X-Trail continued to be sold with the 2.0 engine alongside the T31 X-Trail with the 2.5-litre engine until 2014.

==== Canada ====
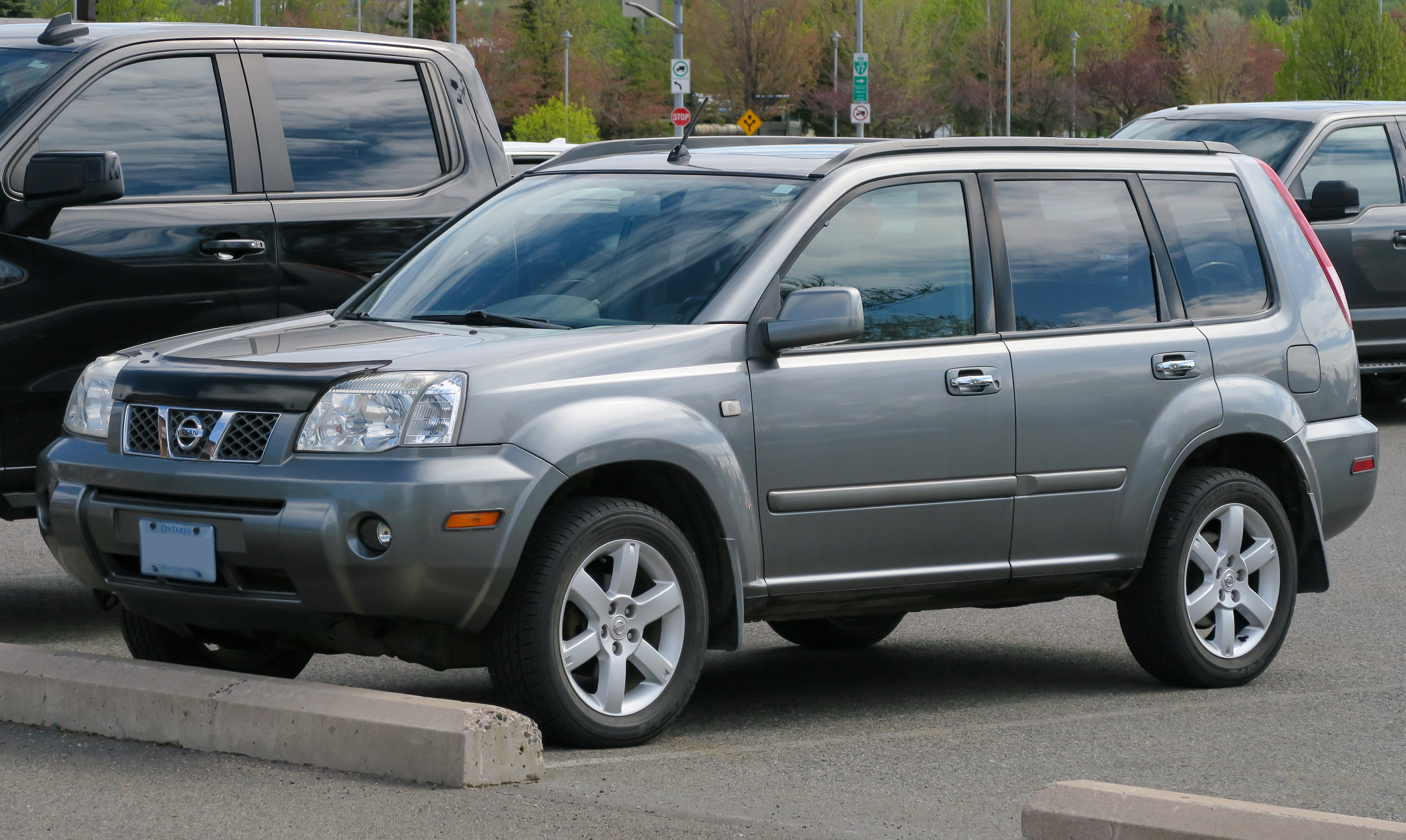
2006 Nissan X-Trail Bonavista

In 2006, Nissan Canada launched a Nissan X-Trail Bonavista Edition commercial, featuring a Nissan dealer speaking in an incomprehensible Newfoundland accent. The commercial itself backfired when Bonavista Mayor Betty Fitzgerald claimed it had portrayed people in Bonavista as people who cannot speak properly. To further expose the commercial's lack of linguistic authenticity, CBC News reported the sales rep was played by an actor from Cape Breton County, Nova Scotia. That commercial was parodied by a local car dealer in St. John's, Newfoundland and Labrador, in a radio advert that takes shots at Ontario marketing companies and Premier Dalton McGuinty's "nondescript" personality.

=== Engines ===
Available only in the Japanese market is the SR20VET that produces 206 kW (276 hp) and is used in the X-Trail GT. The Australian model is powered by a QR25DE 2.5-litre four-cylinder engine initially producing 132 kW (177 hp). From January 2006, the Australian spec engine was detuned to 123 kW (165 hp). Also available is the QR20DE four-cylinder engine, producing 103 kW (138 hp) or 110 kW (150 hp) with manual or automatic transmission. The best-selling engine option in the United Kingdom is the YD22DDTi, a 2.2-litre turbocharged common rail diesel.

=== Safety ===
Euro NCAP test results* Nissan X-Trail 2.0-litre (LHD) (2002)
Test	Score	Rating
Adult occupant:	26	4 /5 stars
Pedestrian:	10	2 /4 stars

== Second generation (T31; 2007) ==
Second generation
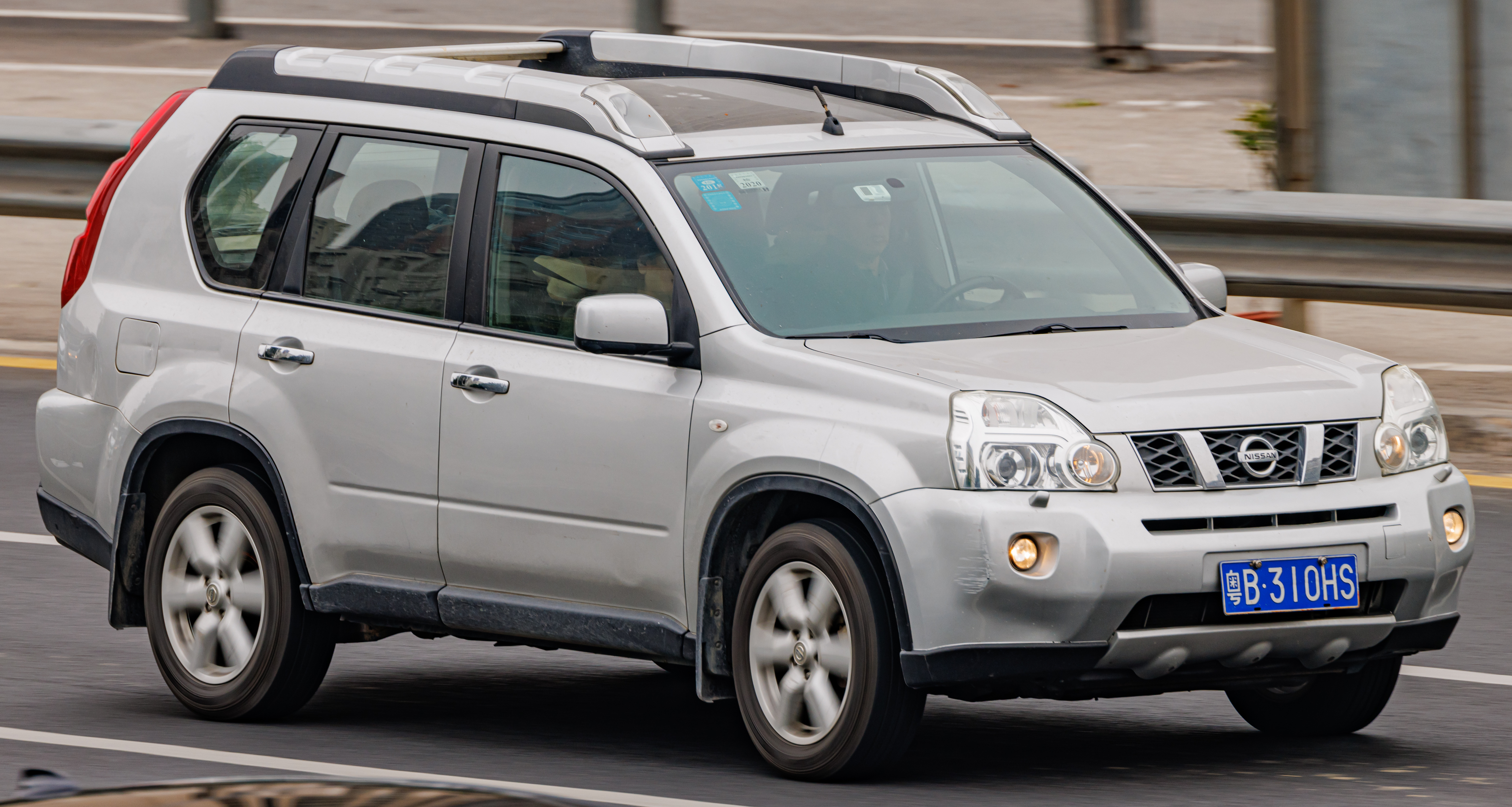
- Nissan X-Trail (China; pre-facelift)

Overview
- Model code: T31
- Also called: Dongfeng Fengdu MX6 (China, 2015–2019)
- Production: 2007–2013 (Japan); 2007–2014 (Indonesia, Russia); 2008–2019 (China)
- Assembly: Japan: Kanda, Fukuoka (Nissan Motor Kyushu); Indonesia: Purwakarta (NMI); Philippines: Santa Rosa City; China: Zhengzhou, Henan (Dongfeng Nissan); India: Chennai (Renault Nissan India)
- Designer: Takashi Utsunomiya (pre-facelift)

Body and chassis
- Platform: Renault–Nissan C platform
- Related: Nissan Sentra (B16); Nissan Rogue (S35); Nissan Qashqai (J10); Renault Koleos I

Powertrain
- Engine: Petrol: 2.0 L MR20DE I4; 2.5 L QR25DE I4; Diesel: 2.0 L M9R turbo-diesel I4
- Transmission: 6-speed manual; 6-speed automatic; CVT

Dimensions
- Wheelbase: 2,629 mm (103.5 in)
- Length: 2007–2010: 4,630 mm (182.3 in); 2011: 4,640 mm (182.7 in)
- Width: 2008–2010: 1,796 mm (70.7 in); 2011–: 1,806 mm (71.1 in)
- Height: 2008–2010 2WD: 1,689 mm (66.5 in); 2008–2010 4WD: 1,770 mm (69.7 in); 2011–2013 2WD: 1,699 mm (66.9 in); 2011–2013 4WD: 1,780 mm (70.1 in)

The second generation X-Trail had its public debut at the Geneva Motor Show in March 2007, and went on sale in Japan in August 2007, Europe in the third quarter of that year, and Australia and Mexico towards the end of the year. Slightly larger than the previous model, it is based on the Renault–Nissan C platform. The second generation was not sold in the United States and Canada, where it was instead replaced by the Rogue.

In Japan, the X-Trail was initially offered with two engines, a 2.5 petrol and a 2.0 petrol powered by a CVT transmission and a 6-speed manual mode for the 2.5 engines. There were two trims available, the entry level S and top-of-the-line X model.

The X-Trail GT SR20VET petrol turbocharged engine was not offered in the second generation X-Trail, due to the 2005 Japan vehicle emissions control. In September 2008, the 20GT became available in Japan, equipped with the M9R, a 2.0-litre turbocharged common rail diesel engine developed jointly with Renault. This was the first diesel X-Trail offered in the Japanese domestic market. The previous 2.2-litre dCI was replaced with two 2.0-litre dCI (M9R) versions, offering 150 and 177 PS (110 and 130 kW; 148 and 175 hp) respectively.

The second generation was released in Malaysia in 2010, where it was fully imported from Indonesia. Only one variant was made available, which consisted of the MR20DE engine paired to a CVT transmission.

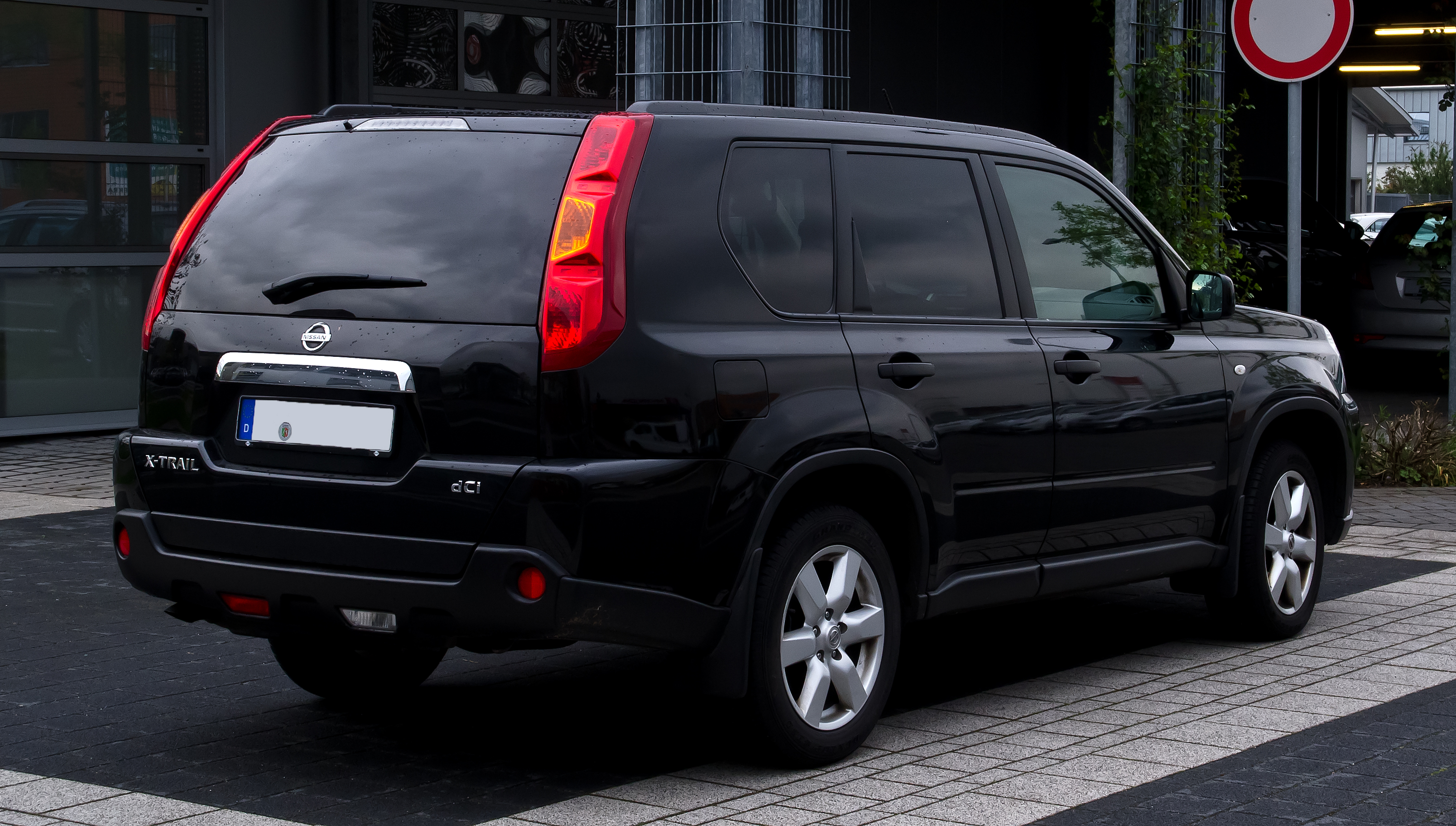
Rear view (pre-facelift)

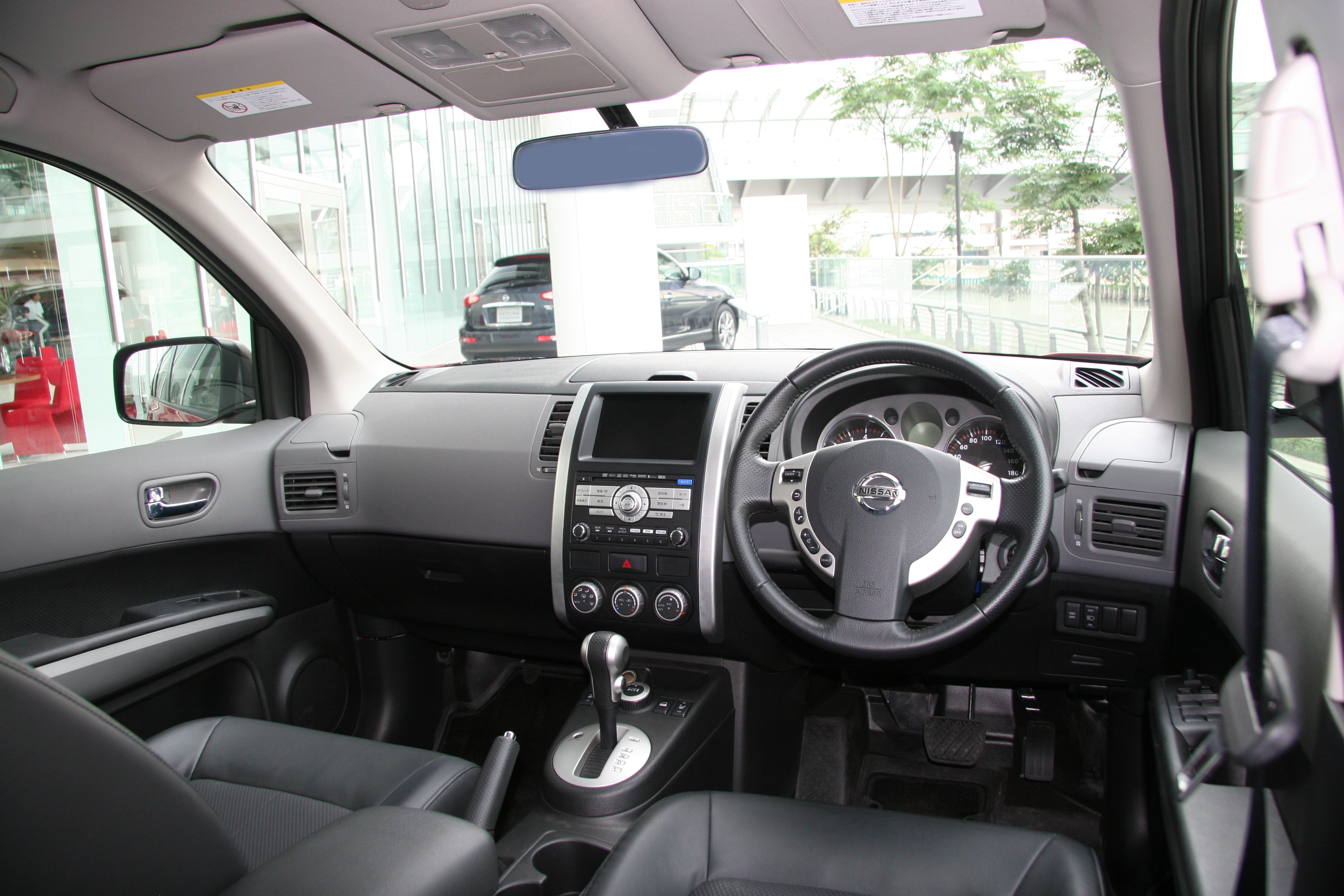
Interior

=== Facelift ===
A facelifted second generation was released in Japan in July 2010. The Nissan X-Trail Platinum, with special features not seen on any other X-Trail, was released in a limited run of 200 vehicles for the United Kingdom in January 2012. The facelift version was made available in Malaysia in April 2013.

The second generation was replaced in October 2013, when the third generation X-Trail was unveiled in Japan. Only petrol engine variants were initially offered for Japan, with the diesel-engine second generation continuing to be available for the domestic market until early 2015.

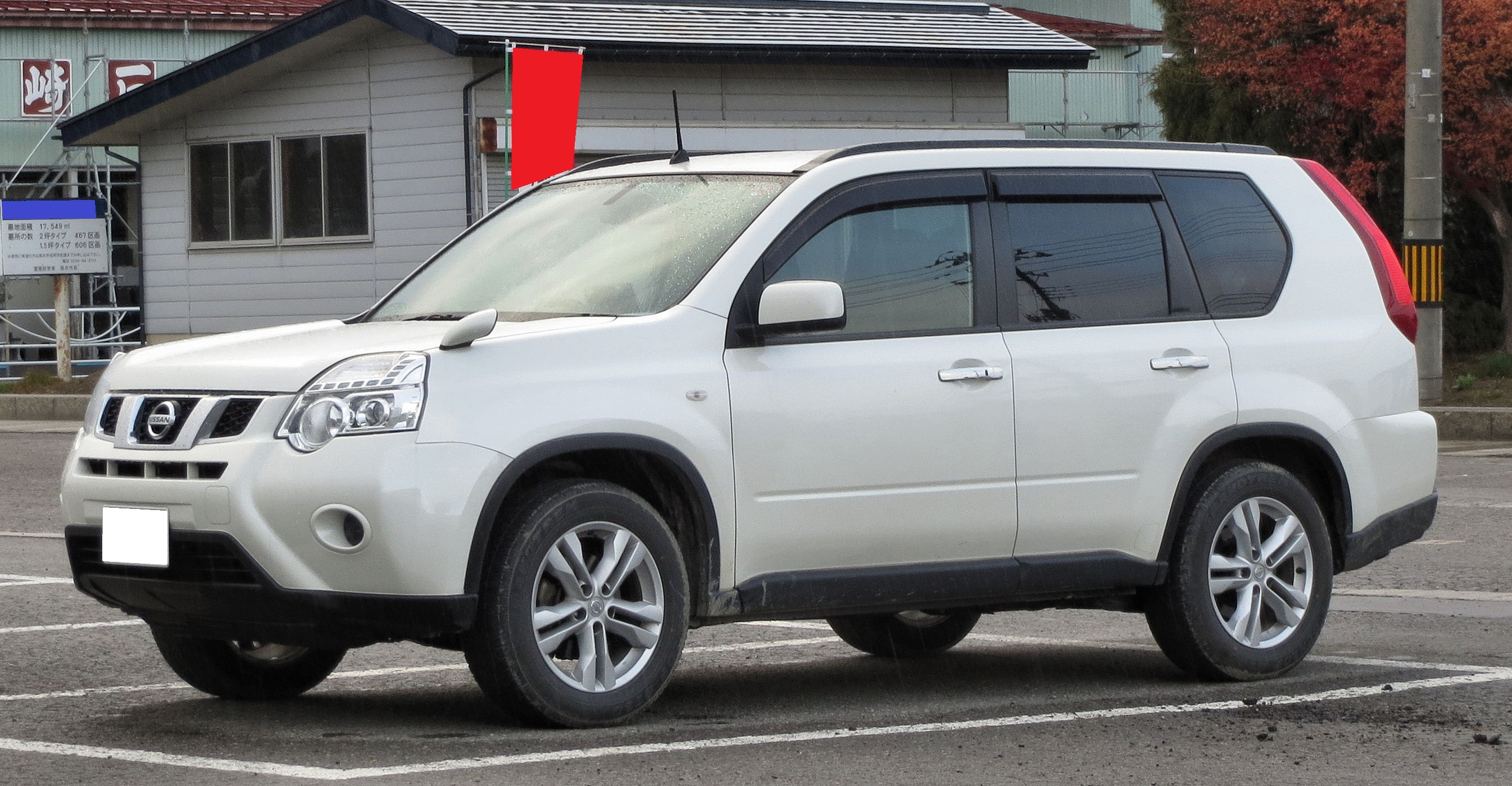
Nissan X-Trail (Japan; facelift)

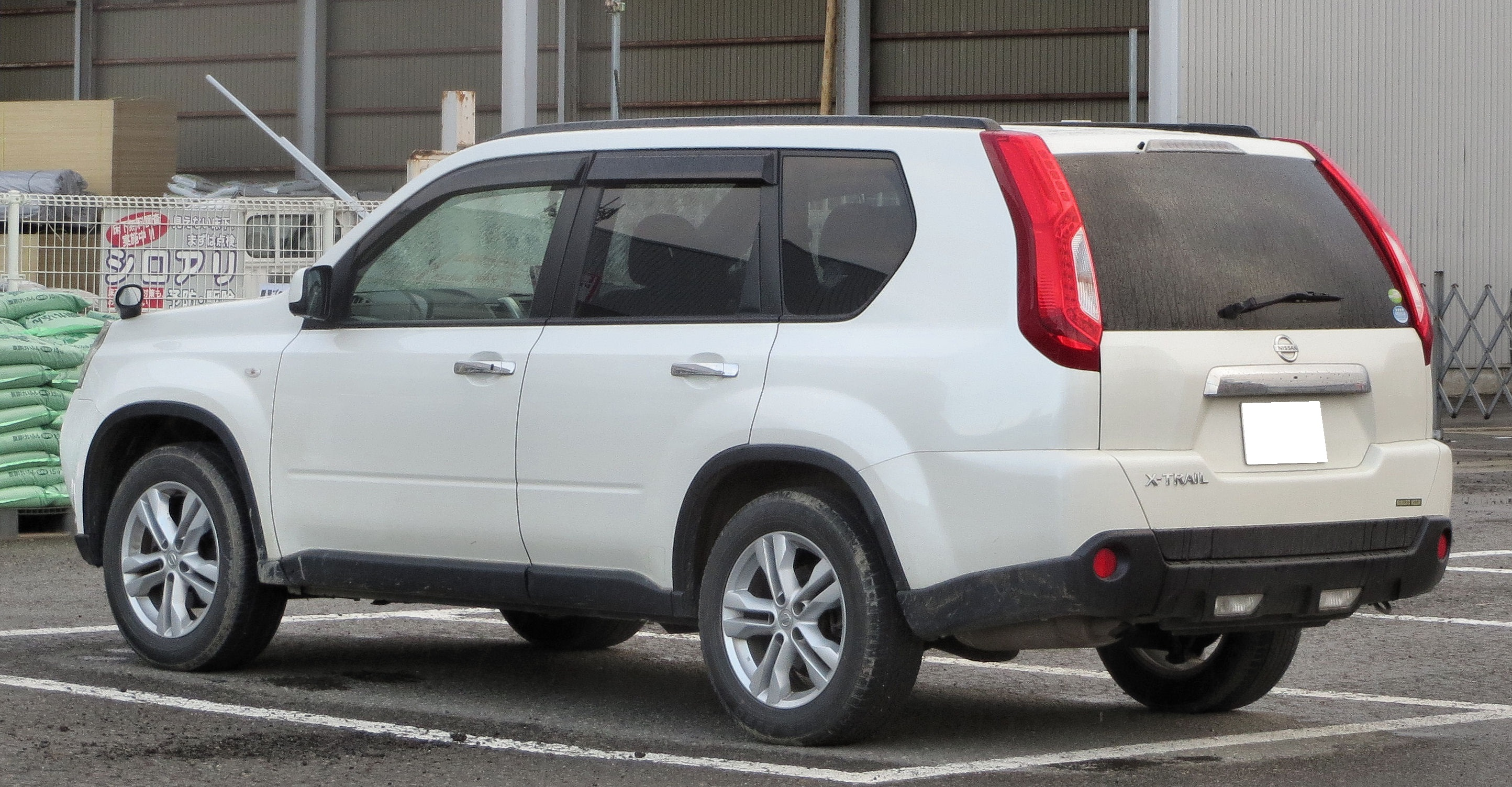
Nissan X-Trail (Japan; facelift) (Rear view)

=== Dongfeng Fengdu MX6 ===
The Dongfeng Fengdu MX6 is a rebadged version of the X-Trail T31, featuring restyled front and rear bumpers produced by Zhengzhou-Nissan, and branded under the Dongfeng-Fengdu sub-brand of Dongfeng Motor Corporation. In March 2015, the model went on sale in China with 4WD and 2WD models available. The 2.0-litre MR20DE engine is standard along with a 6-speed manual or CVT gearbox. Trim levels are Standard, Excellence and Premium.

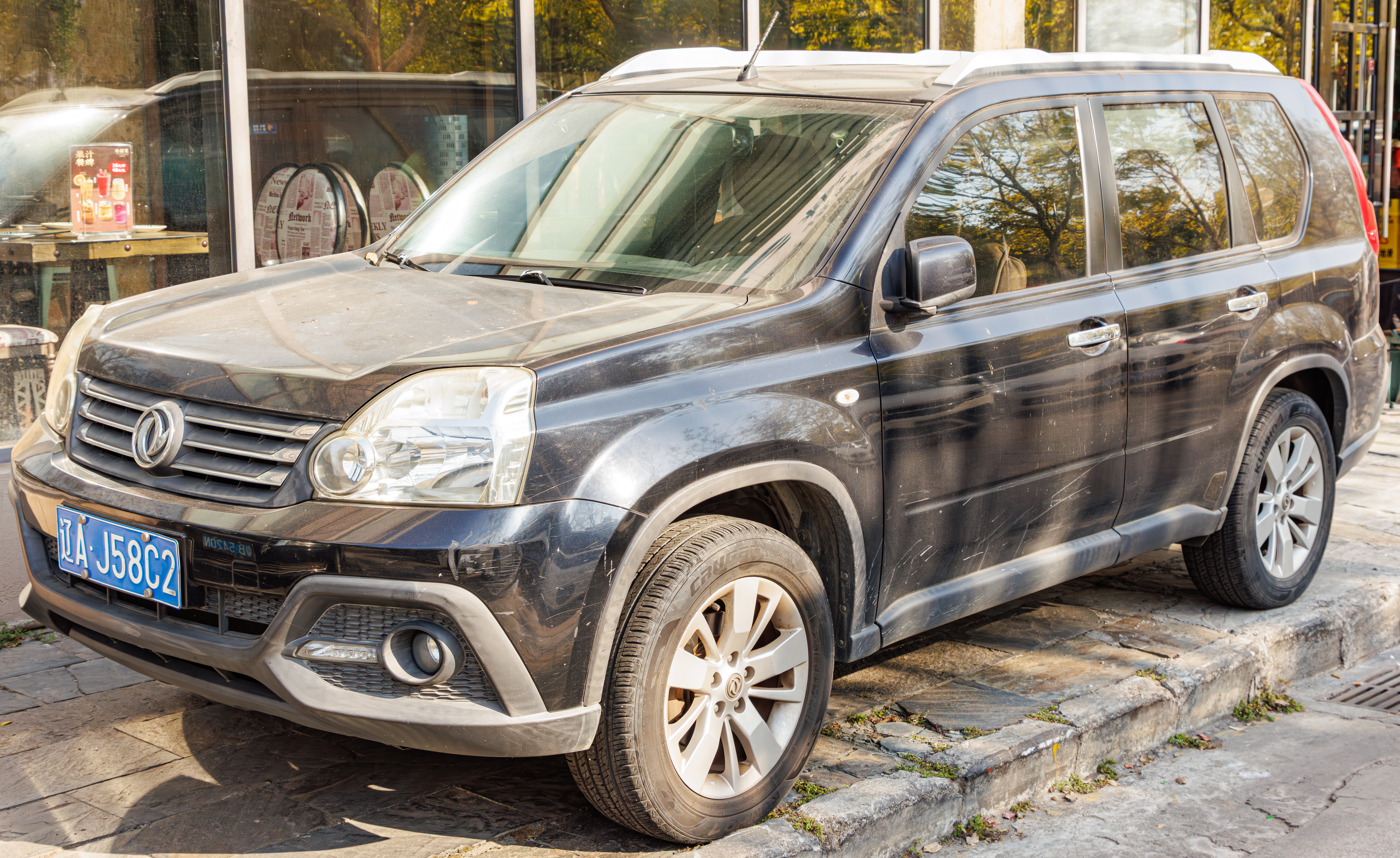
Dongfeng Fengdu MX6 (front)

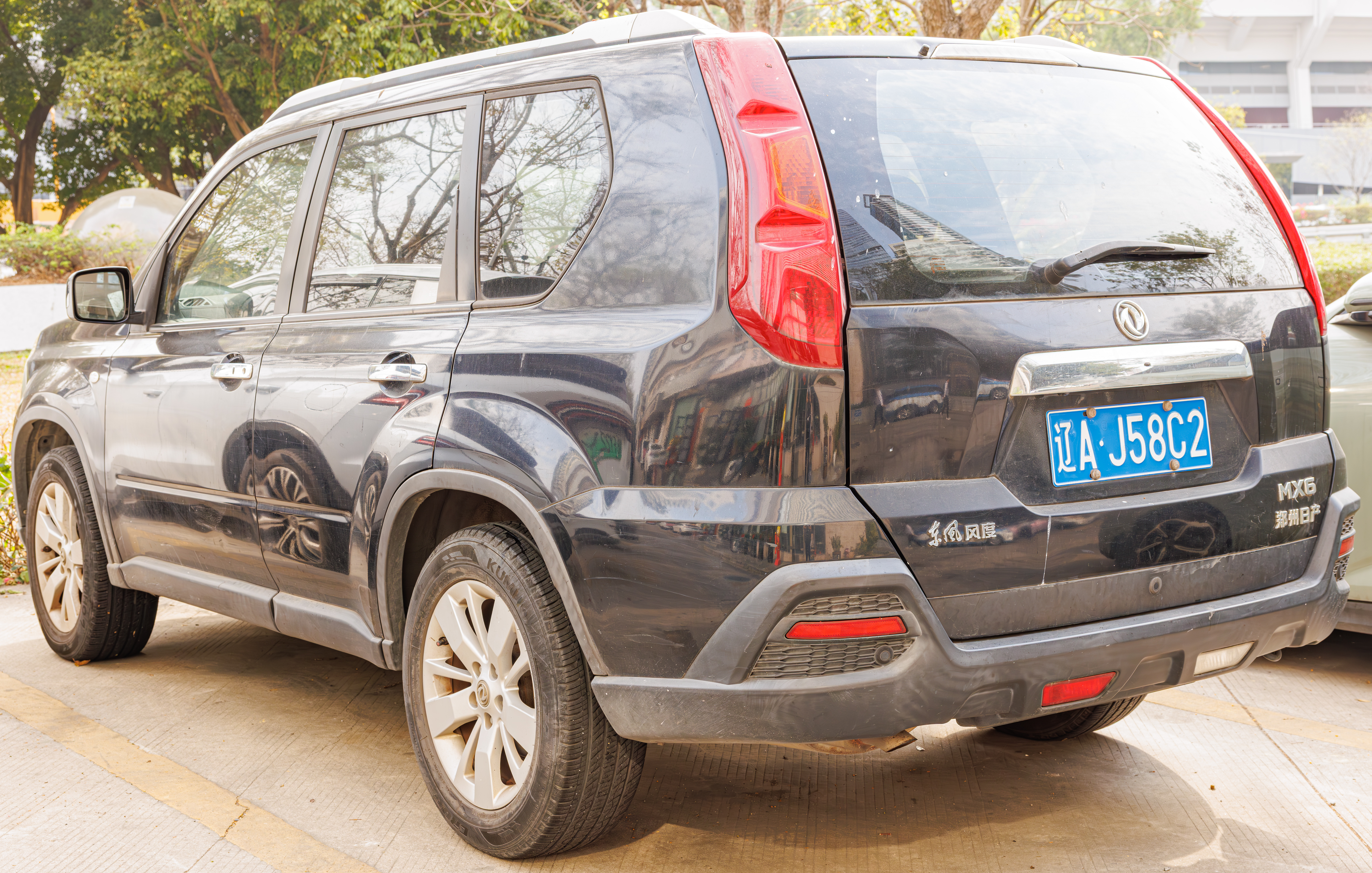
Dongfeng Fengdu MX6 (rear)

=== Safety ===
Euro NCAP test results* Nissan X-Trail 2.0 dCi XE (LHD) (2007)
Test	Score	Rating
Adult occupant:	30	4 /5 stars
Child occupant:	43	4 /5 stars
Pedestrian:	12	2 /4 stars

ANCAP test results* Nissan X-Trail (2007)
Test	Score
Overall	4 /5 stars
Frontal offset	8.59/16
Side impact	16/16
Pole	2/2
Seat belt reminders	0/3
Whiplash protection	Not Assessed
Pedestrian protection	Marginal
Electronic stability control	Standard

== Third generation (T32; 2013) ==
Third generation
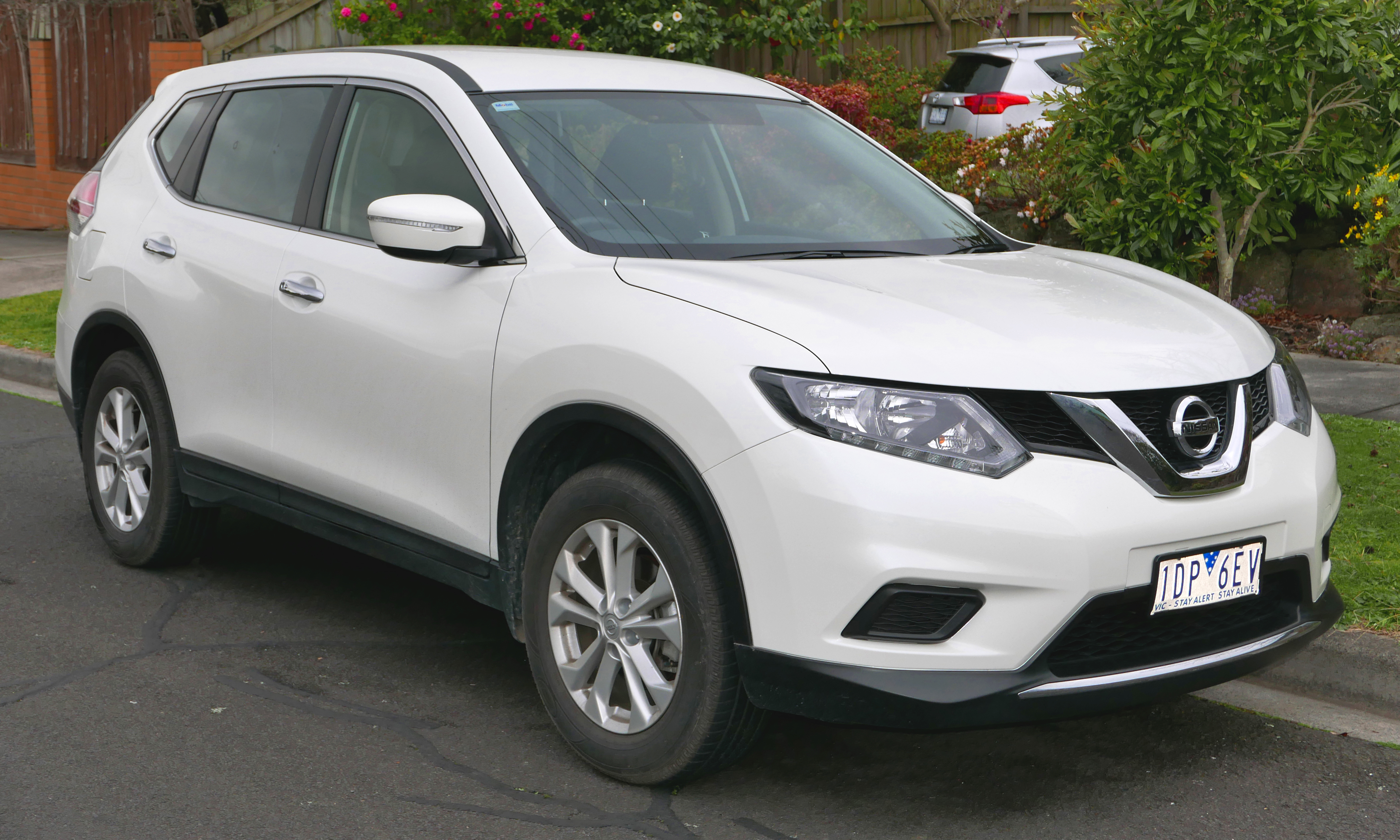
- Nissan X-Trail ST (Australia; pre-facelift)

Overview
- Model code: T32
- Also called: Nissan Rogue; Nissan X-Trail Honor (China, 2021–2023); Nissan X-Trail Classic (China, 2023–present)
- Production: 2013–2022; 2014–present (China); 2014–2019 (Indonesia); 2014–2020 (Thailand); 2015–2024 (Malaysia); 2018–2022 (Russia)
- Assembly: Japan: Kanda, Fukuoka (Nissan Motor Kyushu); China: Dalian, Liaoning; Zhengzhou, Henan (Dongfeng Nissan); Indonesia: Purwakarta (NMI); Malaysia: Serendah (TCMA); Russia: Saint Petersburg (Nissan Manufacturing Rus); South Korea: Busan (Renault Samsung Motors); Taiwan: Miaoli (Yulon); Thailand: Samut Prakan United States: Smyrna, Tennessee (Smyrna Assembly Plant, Rogue only)
- Designer: Nobutaka Tase and Kazunori Murabayashi

Body and chassis
- Platform: Renault–Nissan CMF-CD platform
- Related: Nissan Qashqai/Rogue Sport (J11); Renault Koleos II

Powertrain
- Engine: Petrol: 1.3 L HR13DDT turbo I4; 1.6 L MR16DDT turbo I4; 2.0 L MR20DD I4; 2.5 L QR25DE I4; Petrol hybrid: 2.0 L MR20DD I4; Diesel: 1.6 L R9M I4; 1.7 L R9N I4; 2.0 L M9R I4
- Electric motor: 41 PS (30 kW; 40 hp) Synchronous Electric Motor (X-Trail Hybrid)
- Transmission: 6-speed manual; CVT; 7-speed DCT
- Hybrid drivetrain: Parallel hybrid (X-Trail Hybrid)
- Battery: 202 V Li-ion (Hybrid)

Dimensions
- Wheelbase: 2,705 mm (106.5 in)
- Length: 4,640–4,690 mm (182.7–184.6 in)
- Width: 1,820–1,830 mm (71.7–72.0 in)
- Height: 1,710–1,715 mm (67.3–67.5 in)

Chronology
- Predecessor: Nissan Qashqai+2 (3-row model)

The third generation X-Trail was unveiled at the 2013 Frankfurt Motor Show. Based on an all-new CMF-CD platform shared with the Nissan Qashqai and Renault Koleos, the vehicle is a common successor for the second generation X-Trail and the Rogue that is offered in North America. It enables the model to be available in 190 countries around the globe, a projection Nissan made during its launch. It ditches the boxy SUV look in favour of an urban crossover look and softer lines inspired from the Hi-Cross Concept.

Although the new Nissan X-Trail has a larger surface area than the outgoing car, Nissan says weight has been reduced wherever possible. It features a tailgate dominated by plastic which saves 7 kg. Aerodynamics have also benefited from carefully shaped door mirrors as well as a spoiler that covers the exhaust box and rear panel.

The vehicle was also subsequently unveiled the 43rd Tokyo Motor Show 2013, and the 2014 Geneva Motor Show.

Production of the third-generation model continues in China alongside its successor, and it is sold as Nissan X-Trail Honor by Dongfeng Nissan since 2021. In 2023, it was renamed as the Nissan X-Trail Classic.

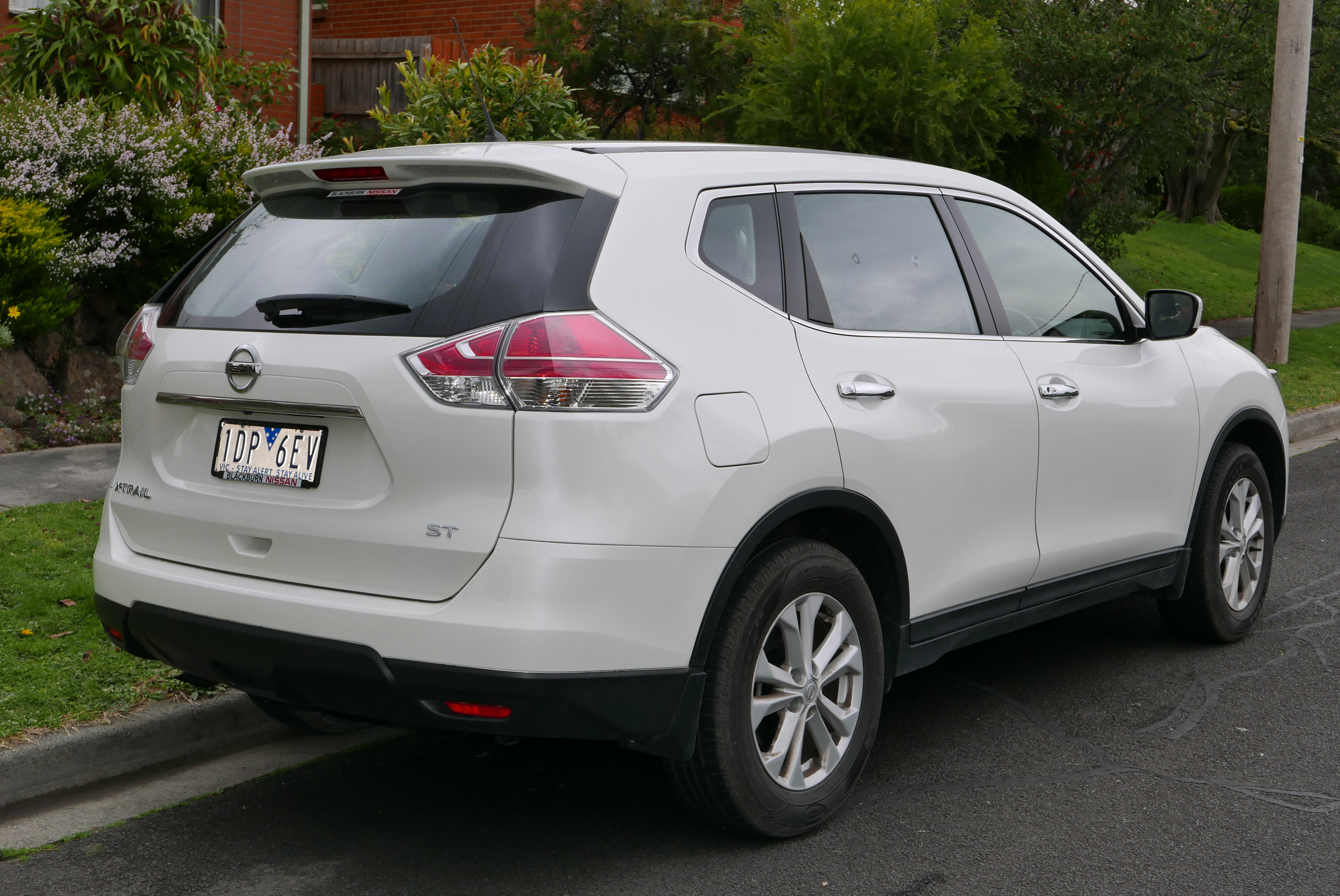
Rear view (pre-facelift)

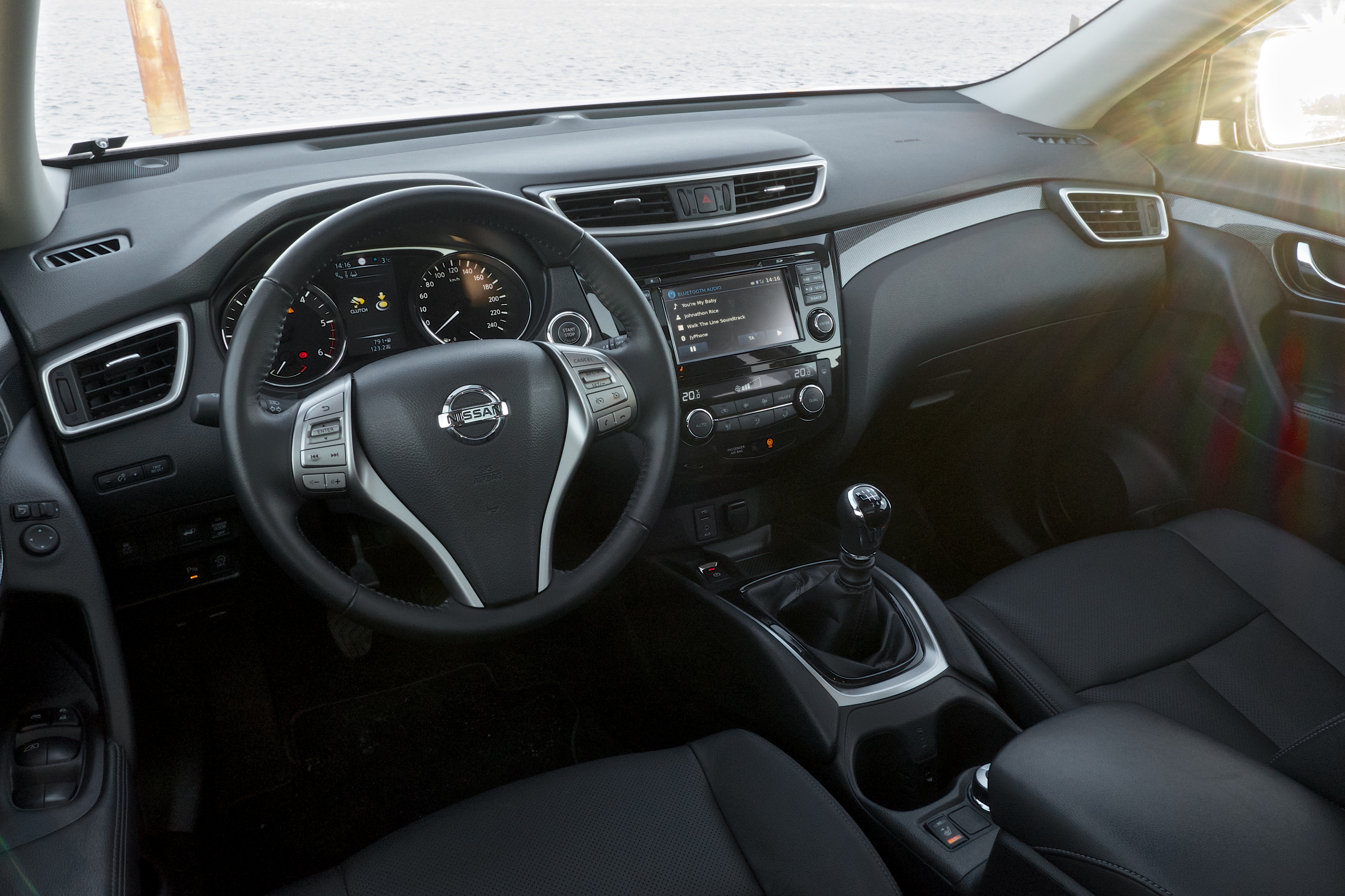
Interior (pre-facelift)

=== Markets ===
==== Asia ====
Japanese sales commenced on 11 December 2013. Powered by a MR20DD engine, and an option of two or three rows of seats. Variants include 20S, 20X, 20X Emergency Brake Package, 20X X-TREMER X and 20X Emergency Brake Package X-TREMER X. In April 2015, Nissan announced that an X-Trail hybrid with claimed fuel economy of 4.9 L/100 km was coming to Japan.

Chinese models went on sale in the end of March 2014.

It was also launched in Thailand in November 2014 and it is manufactured in Samut Prakan, Thailand for Thai domestic demand.

In the Philippines, the third generation X-Trail was launched on 19 September 2014 during the 5th Philippine International Motor Show and is offered in two variants; 2.0L 2WD CVT and 2.5L 4WD CVT. The facelifted X-Trail was launched in the Philippines in September 2017. Engine choices remained the same as the pre-facelift model. It was also launched in Thailand in February 2019 where consumers had the choice between several variants powered by either a 2.5-litre petrol engine or a 2.0-litre hybrid powertrain.

On 12 September 2014, prior to the 22nd Indonesia International Motor Show, Nissan Motor Indonesia launched the third generation Nissan X-Trail. It is only available with three rows of seats at the time. It is manufactured in Purwakarta, Indonesia for domestic demand. The hybrid version was unveiled at 23rd Gaikindo Indonesia International Auto Show.

The facelifted X-Trail was also launched in Indonesia on 18 July 2019 at the 27th Gaikindo Indonesia International Auto Show, and went on sale in August 2019. It is only available in VL trim and powered by a 2.5-litre petrol engine with CVT.

For the Malaysian market, the third generation X-Trail was launched in January 2015 with two variants: 2.0L 2WD (CVT) or 2.5L 4WD (CVT). Since launch, various editions have been made available namely Impul, Aero Edition and X-Tremer. All the various editions were/are sold alongside the regular X-Trail and like the regular X-Trail are available with either a 2.0L 2WD or 2.5L 4WD. In March 2019, bookings were opened for the facelifted X-Trail with a media preview happening in the same month as well. The facelifted X-Trail was available in Malaysia beginning in April 2019, and was available in four variants: 2.0 2WD, 2.0 2WD Mid, 2.5 4WD, and 2.0 Hybrid. All variants were only available with CVT.

==== Australia ====
Australian models went on sale in March 2014 with both petrol and diesel variants: ST 2.0 2WD 6-speed Manual, ST, ST-L and Ti 2.5 CVT and TS 1.6 dCi 2WD CVT, TS 1.6 dCi 4WD CVT, TL 1.6 dCi 2WD CVT and TL 1.6 dCi 4WD 6-speed manual. On ST and ST-L 2.5, third row seats are available. European models went on sale in July 2014, with the only engine available being a Renault-sourced 1.6 dCi R9M diesel engine with CVT or 6-speed manual.

=== Facelift (2017) ===
For 2017, the Nissan X-Trail was facelifted, with restyled headlights and tail lights, restyled twin LED projector headlamps with high intensity discharge and LED daytime running lights, which were offered on SL trim levels with the premium package, while S, SV, and the SL trim levels without the premium package offered halogen headlamps with LED daytime running lights, and LED taillights are available on all trim levels. The 2.5L engine with 170 hp carries over from the previous model.

The facelifted X-Trail went on sale in October 2016. A hybrid version premiered in January 2017. The 2017 model year hybrid features regenerative braking, pure drive hybrid emblems, energy monitor, hybrid battery status, under floor storage area replacing the "Divide-N-Hide" cargo system, a 2.0-litre four-cylinder gasoline engine (power: 141 hp and torque: 141 lb-ft) and Xtronic CVT combined with an electric motor (power: 40 hp) and lithium-ion battery, for a combined power of 176 hp.

The lithium-ion battery was located below the thick flooring of the under floor cargo storage area. The X-Trail Hybrid was available in two trim levels, SV and SL, but the Nissan X-Trail Hybrid was not available with third row seating (Family Package) and "Divide-N-Hide" cargo system, due to the position of the battery.

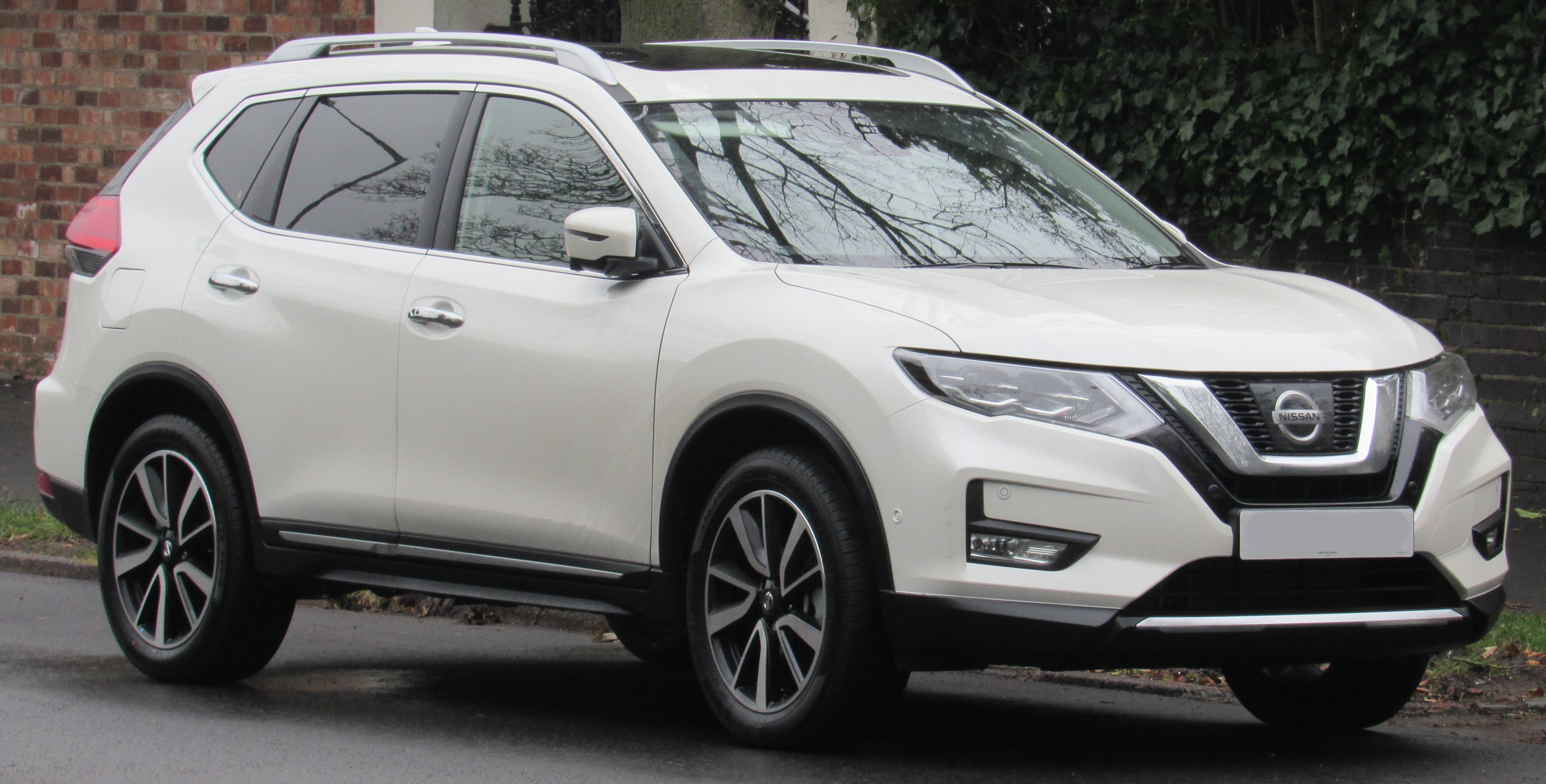
2017 Nissan X-Trail (facelift)

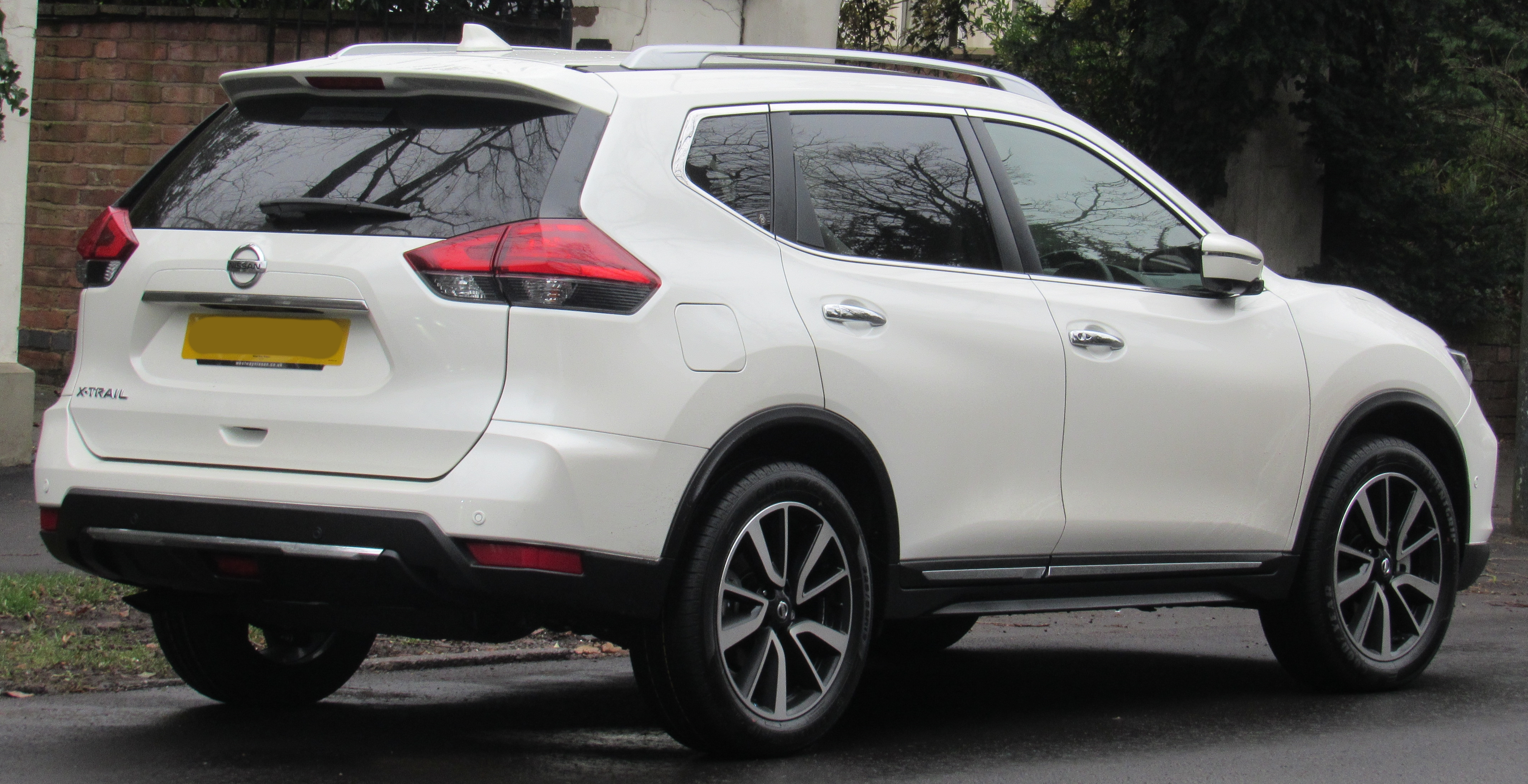
Rear view (facelift)

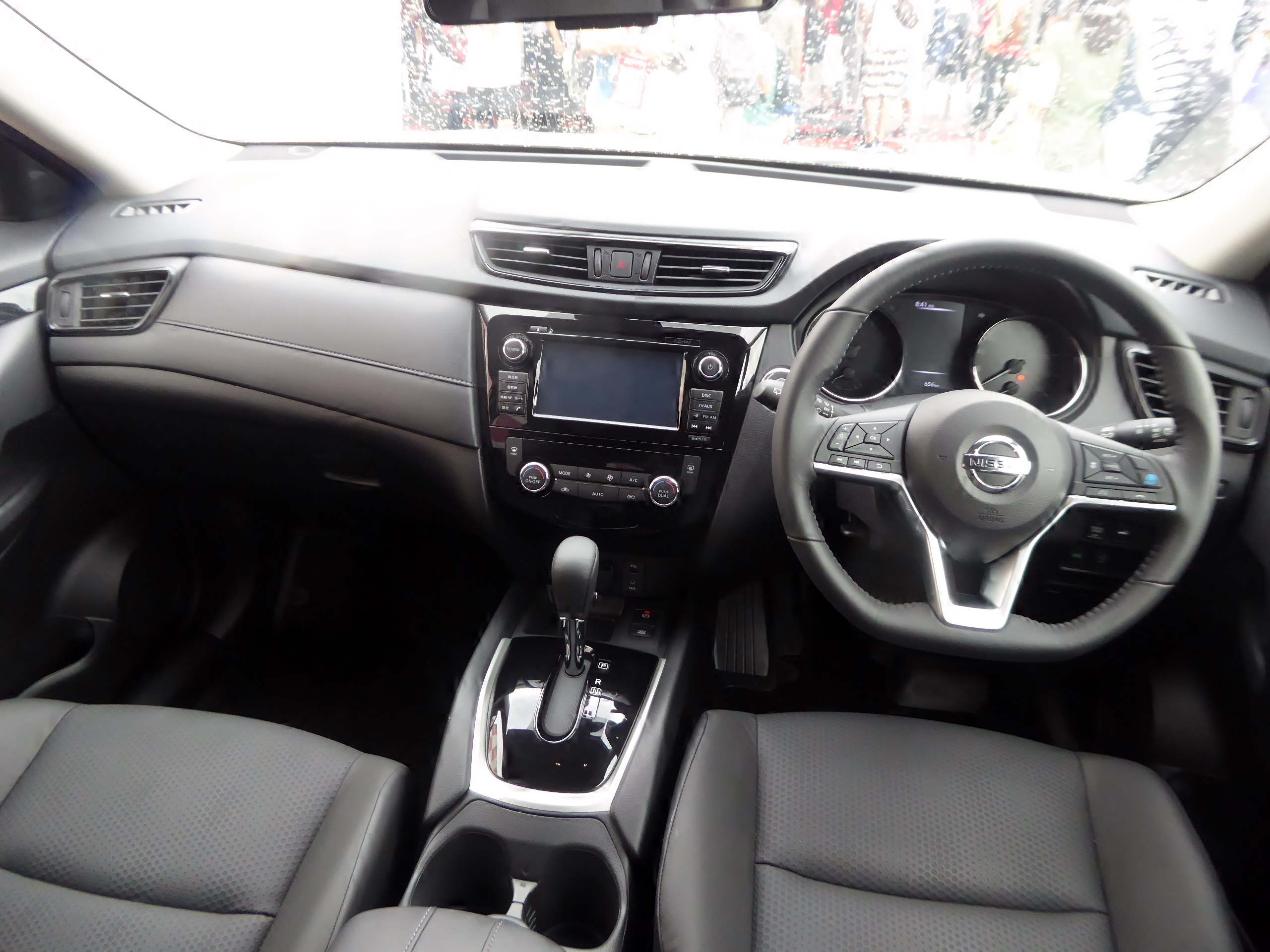
Interior (facelift)

=== Production ===
On 27 October 2016, Nissan Motor Corporation announced the production of the next X-Trail at NMUK. In February 2019, these plans were cancelled, with production planned to remain in Japan, citing concerns about Brexit related uncertainty. The declining popularity of diesel cars was another factor.

Nissan's Sunderland plant in the United Kingdom has been in operation since 1986, and has around 7,000 employees. Sunderland will continue to manufacture several Nissan models and the company reaffirmed its commitment to manufacture the new Qashqai for 2020 at the plant in the United Kingdom. Both Nissan and British officials confirmed that no jobs would be lost due to the modified arrangement, which will see production of the X-Trail moved to Kyushu.

Assembly of the X-Trail in Indonesia ended in February 2019 and replaced with an imported version from Japan, followed by Thailand which halted production in September 2020 without any replacement.

=== Safety ===
Euro NCAP test results* Nissan X-Trail 1.6 diesel Acenta (LHD) (2014)
Test	Points	%
Overall:	5 /5 stars	
Adult occupant:	32.7	86%
Child occupant:	40.7	83%
Pedestrian:	27.3	75%
Safety assist:	9.8	75%

ANCAP test results* Nissan X-Trail (2014)
Test	Score
Overall	5 /5 stars
Frontal offset	14.68/16
Side impact	16/16
Pole	2/2
Seat belt reminders	2.6/3
Whiplash protection	Good
Pedestrian protection	Adequate
Electronic stability control	Standard

ANCAP test results* Nissan X-Trail all petrol & 1.6 litre diesel variants (2017)
Test	Score
Overall	5 /5 stars
Frontal offset	14.68/16
Side impact	16/16
Pole	2/2
Seat belt reminders	2.6/3
Whiplash protection	Good
Pedestrian protection	Adequate
Electronic stability control	Standard

== Fourth generation (T33; 2021) ==
Fourth generation
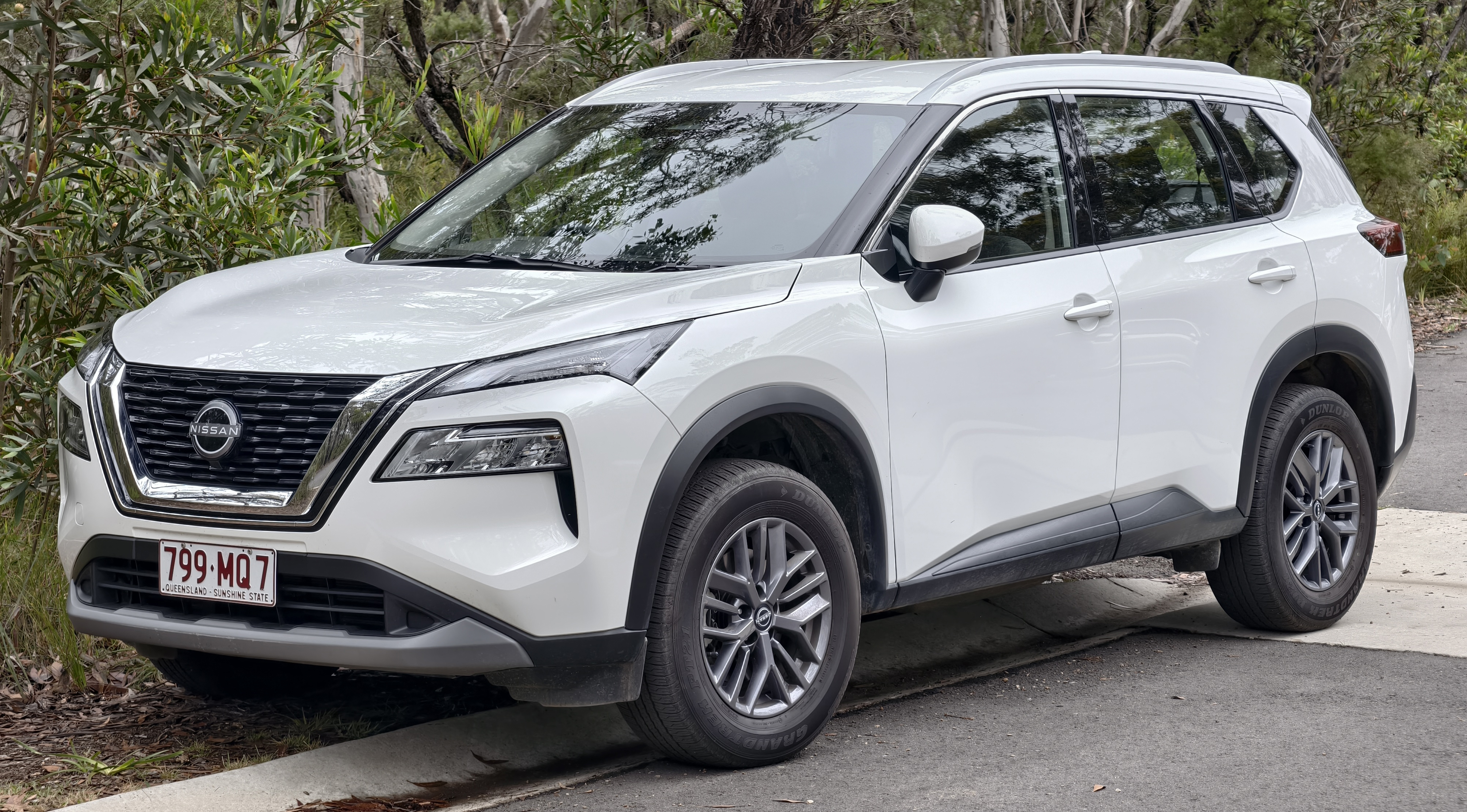
- 2024 X-Trail e-Power (Australia)

Overview
- Model code: T33
- Also called: Nissan Rogue (US and Canada)
- Production: April 2021–present
- Model years: 2021–present (US)
- Assembly: China: Dalian, Liaoning; Zhengzhou, Henan (Dongfeng Nissan, X-Trail); Japan: Kanda, Fukuoka (Nissan Motor Kyushu); United States: Smyrna, Tennessee (Nissan USA, Rogue); Taiwan: Miaoli (Yulon)
- Designer: Lars Taubert, Takeo Horie and Shinya Momokawa

Body and chassis
- Platform: Renault–Nissan CMF-CD platform
- Related: Nissan Qashqai (J12); Mitsubishi Outlander (fourth generation); Nissan Rogue Plug-in Hybrid

Powertrain
- Engine: Petrol: 1.5 L KR15DDT I3-T; 2.5 L PR25DD I4; Petrol hybrid: 1.5 L KR15DDT e-Power I3
- Transmission: Xtronic CVT; Single-speed constant ratio (e-Power)
- Hybrid drivetrain: Series hybrid (e-Power)
- Battery: Lithium-ion (e-Power)

Dimensions
- Wheelbase: 2,706 mm (106.5 in)
- Length: 4,681 mm (184.3 in)
- Width: 1,840 mm (72.4 in)
- Height: 1,730 mm (68.1 in)
- Curb weight: 1,590–2,024 kg (3,505.3–4,462.2 lb)

The fourth-generation X-Trail, designated under the model code T33, was unveiled on 19 April 2021 at the Auto Shanghai in China and went on sale in the second half of 2021, which was the year after its Rogue counterpart was launched in North America in June 2020. It shifts away from diesel engines in favor of offering petrol and hybrid engine options.

The T33 X-Trail is 15 mm (0.6 in) taller, 20 mm (0.8 in) wider, 10 mm (0.4 in) shorter in length while the wheelbase is unchanged from the previous generation. The boot capacity is measured at 560 L of storage capacity with the second row seats in place, a decrease of 5 L.

For the e-Power model, the system combines the variable compression ratio 1.5-litre VC-Turbo three-cylinder petrol engine with the second-generation e-Power series hybrid powertrain. The second-generation hybrid system is said to be improved in terms of "power, smoothness, and quietness" compared to its predecessor.

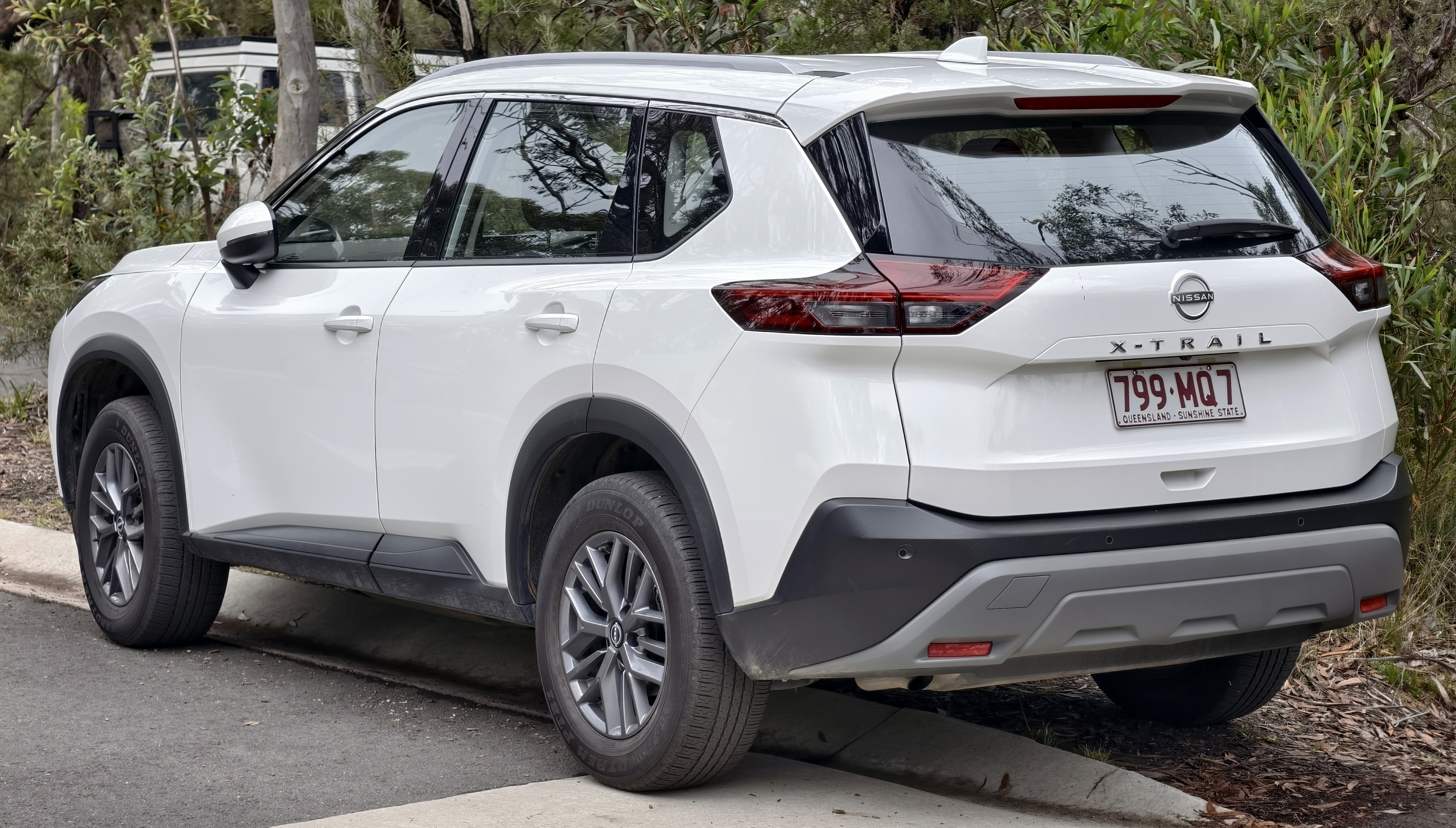
Rear view

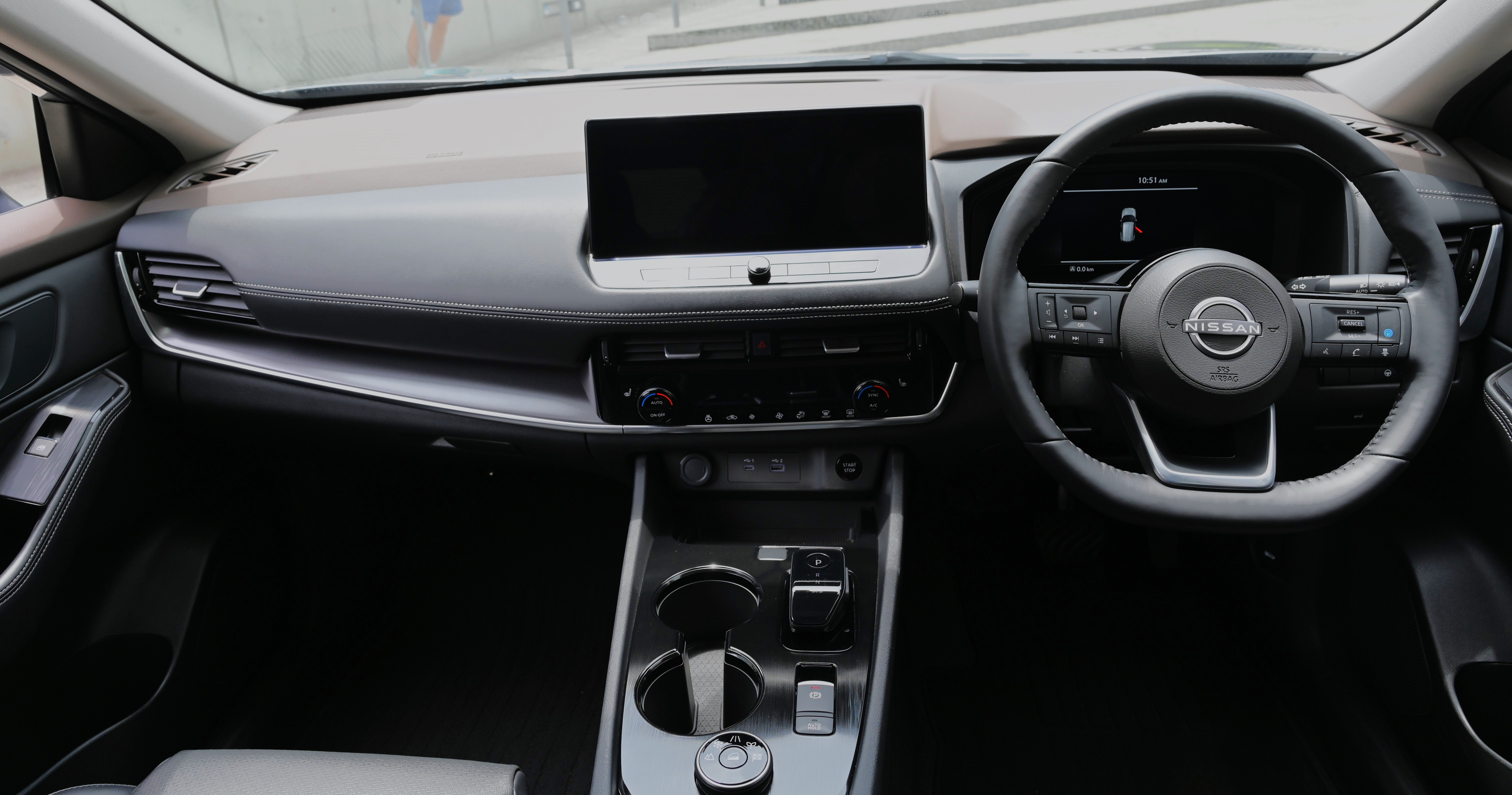
Interior

=== Facelift (2025) ===
The facelifted X-Trail was launched on 21 August 2025, the Nismo and the Rock Creek variants was added.

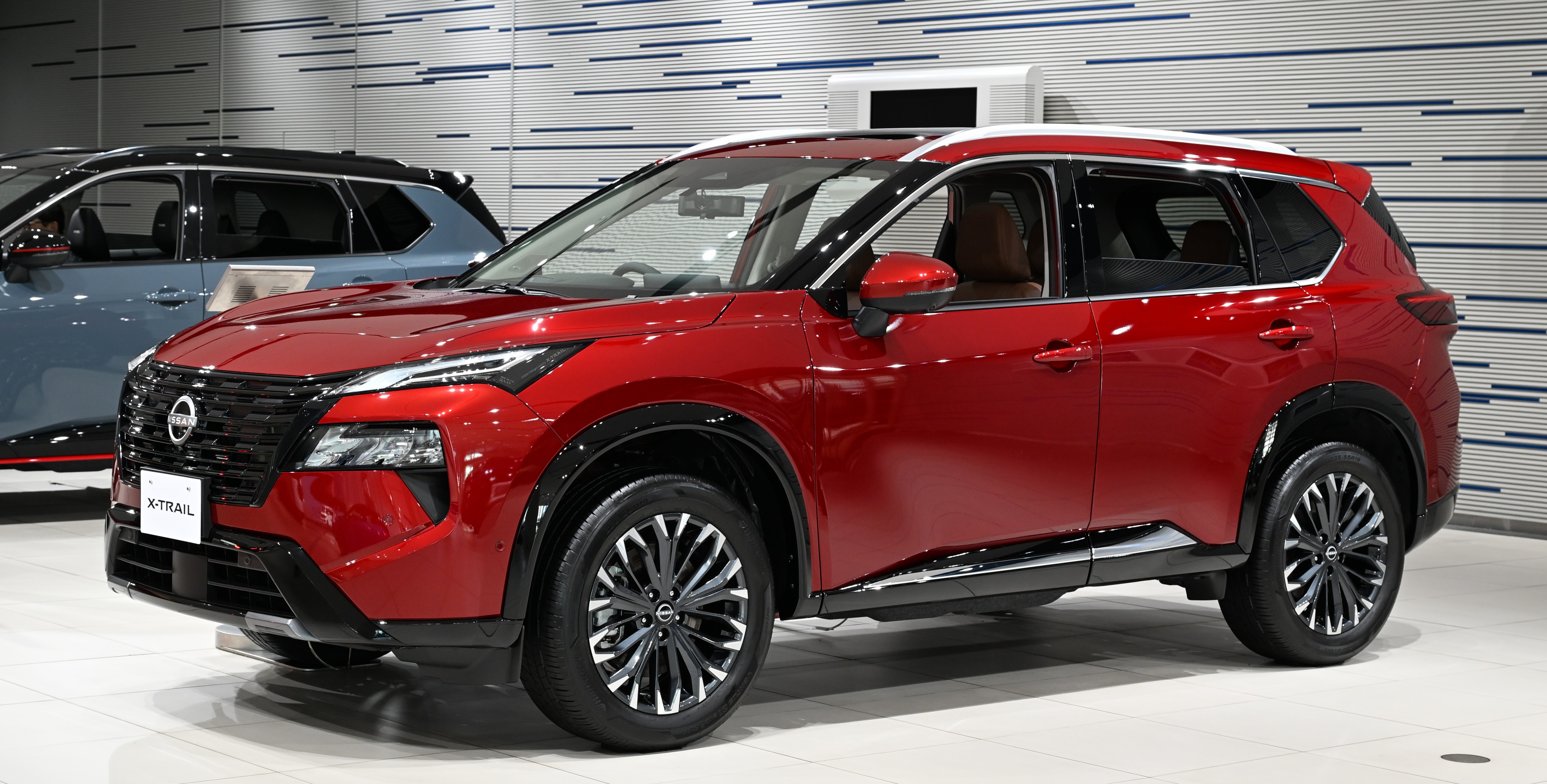
2025 facelift X-Trail G (front)

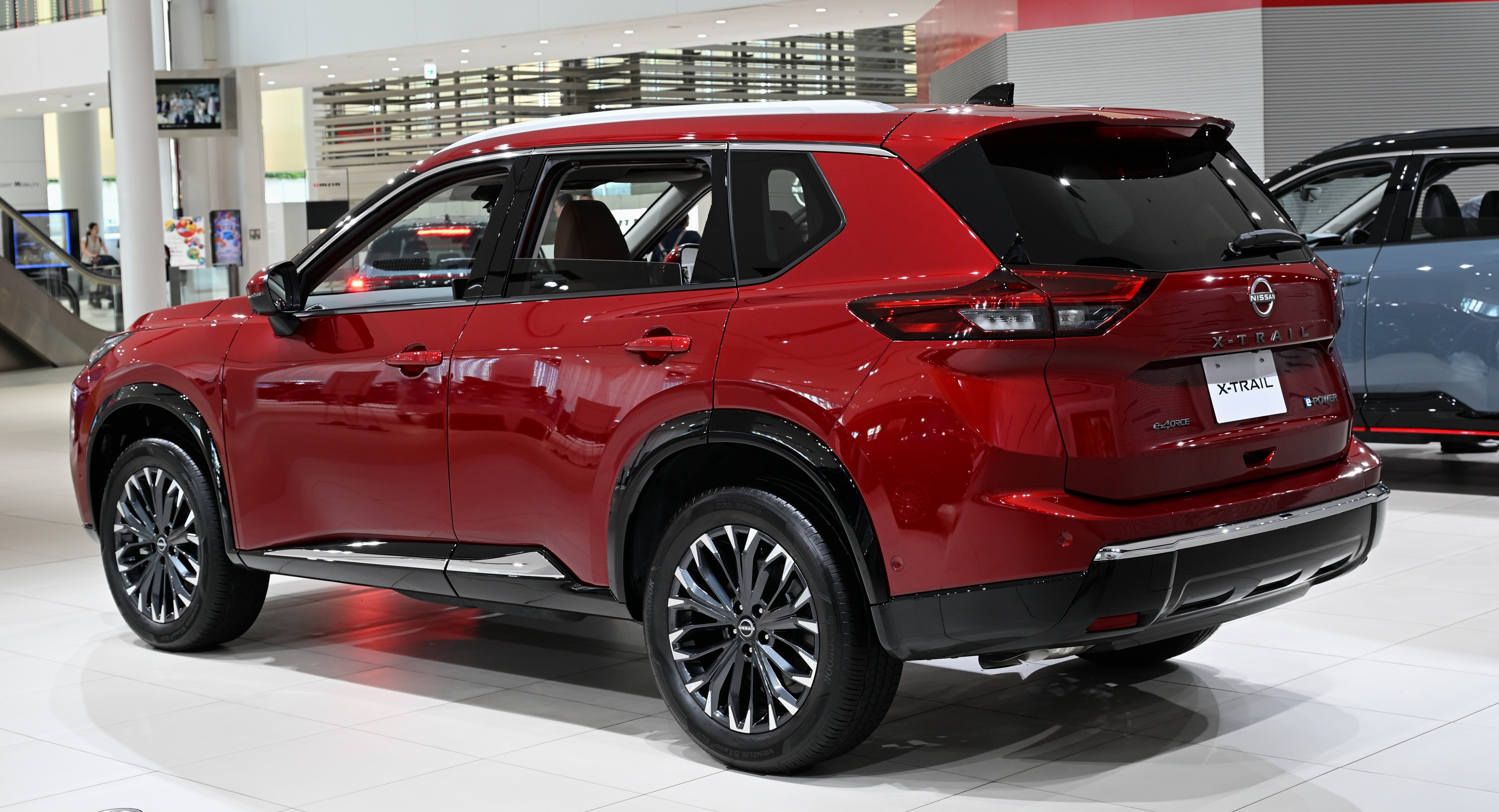
2025 facelift X-Trail G (rear)

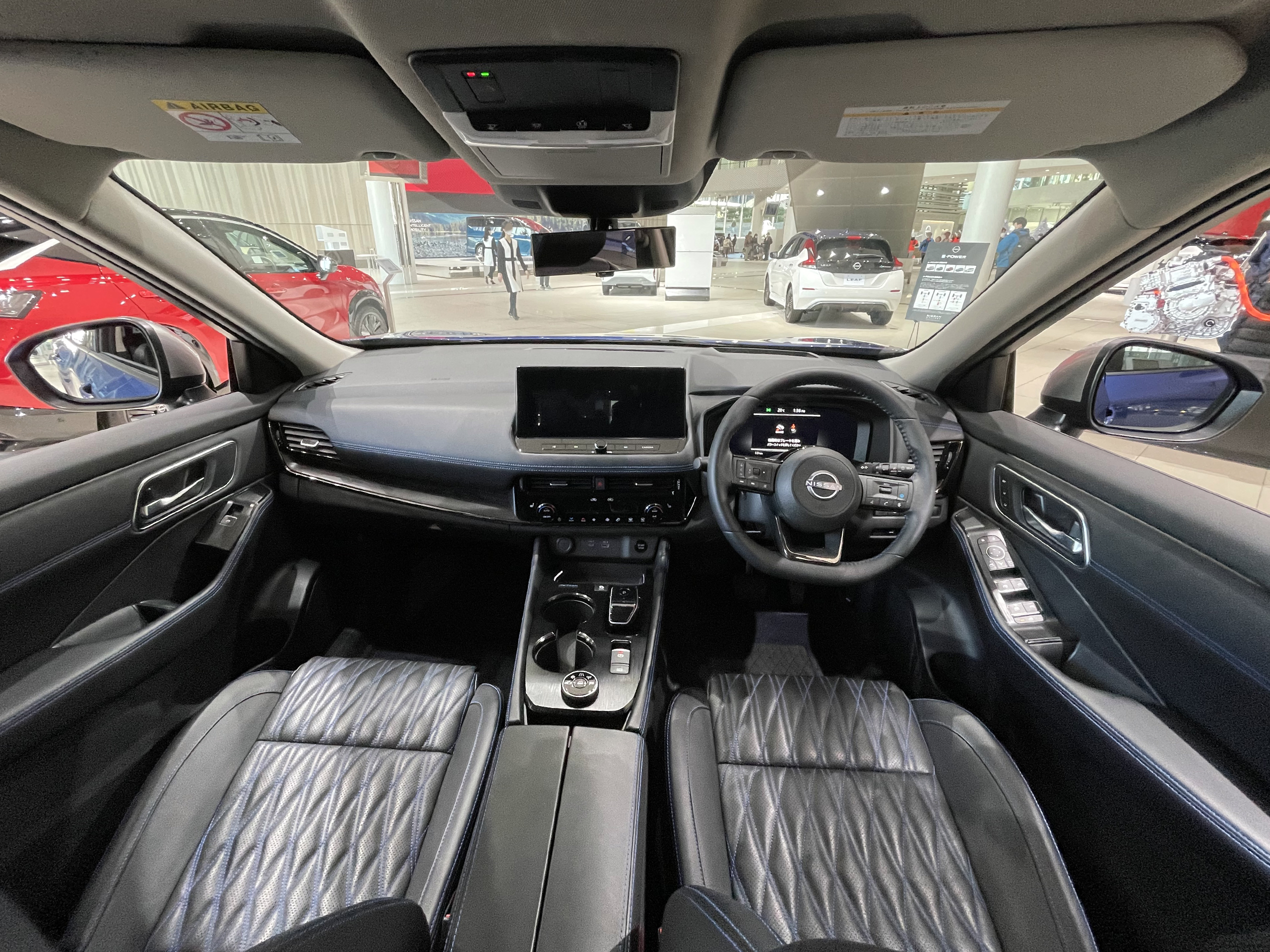
2025 facelift X-Trail Autech (interior)

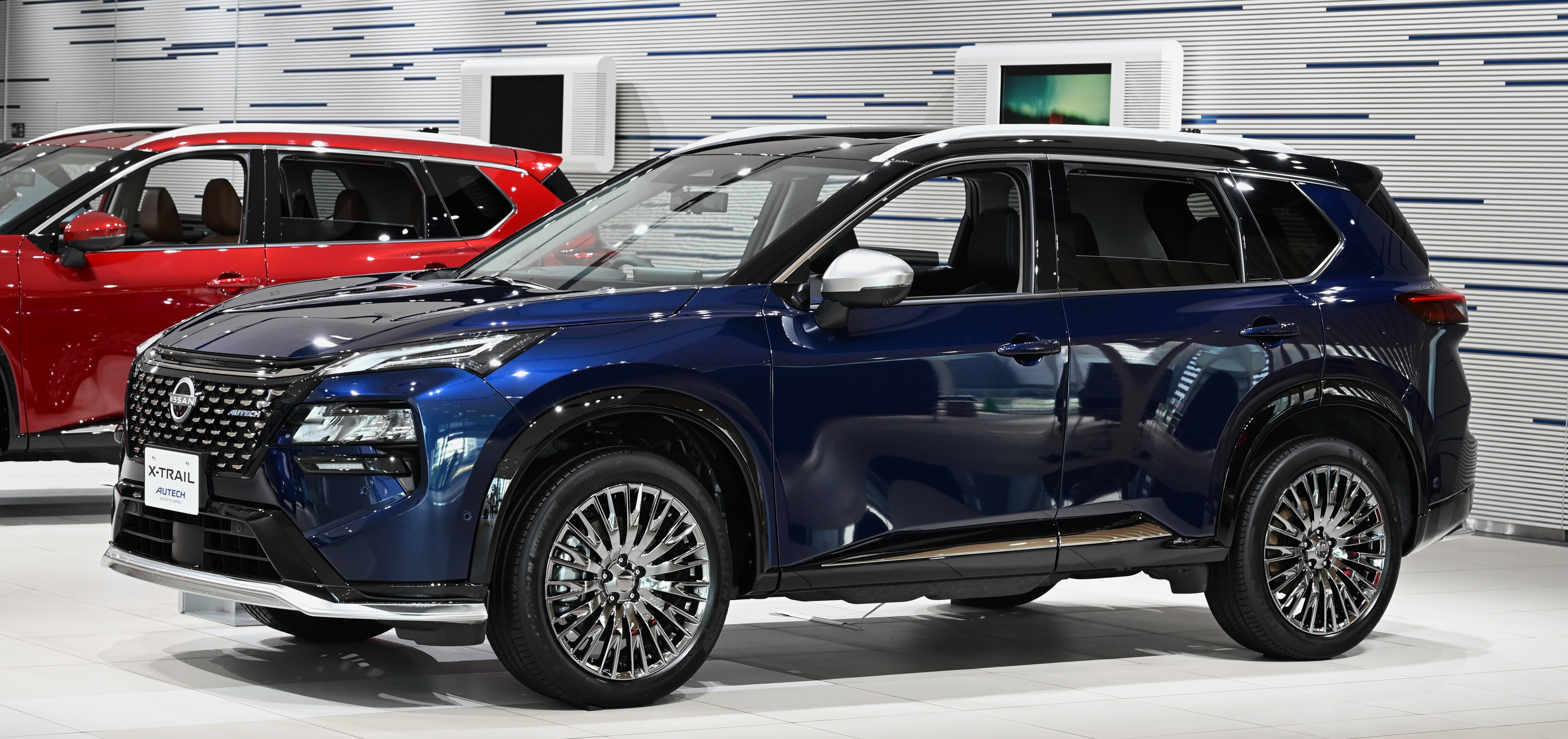
2025 facelift X-Trail Autech Sports (front)

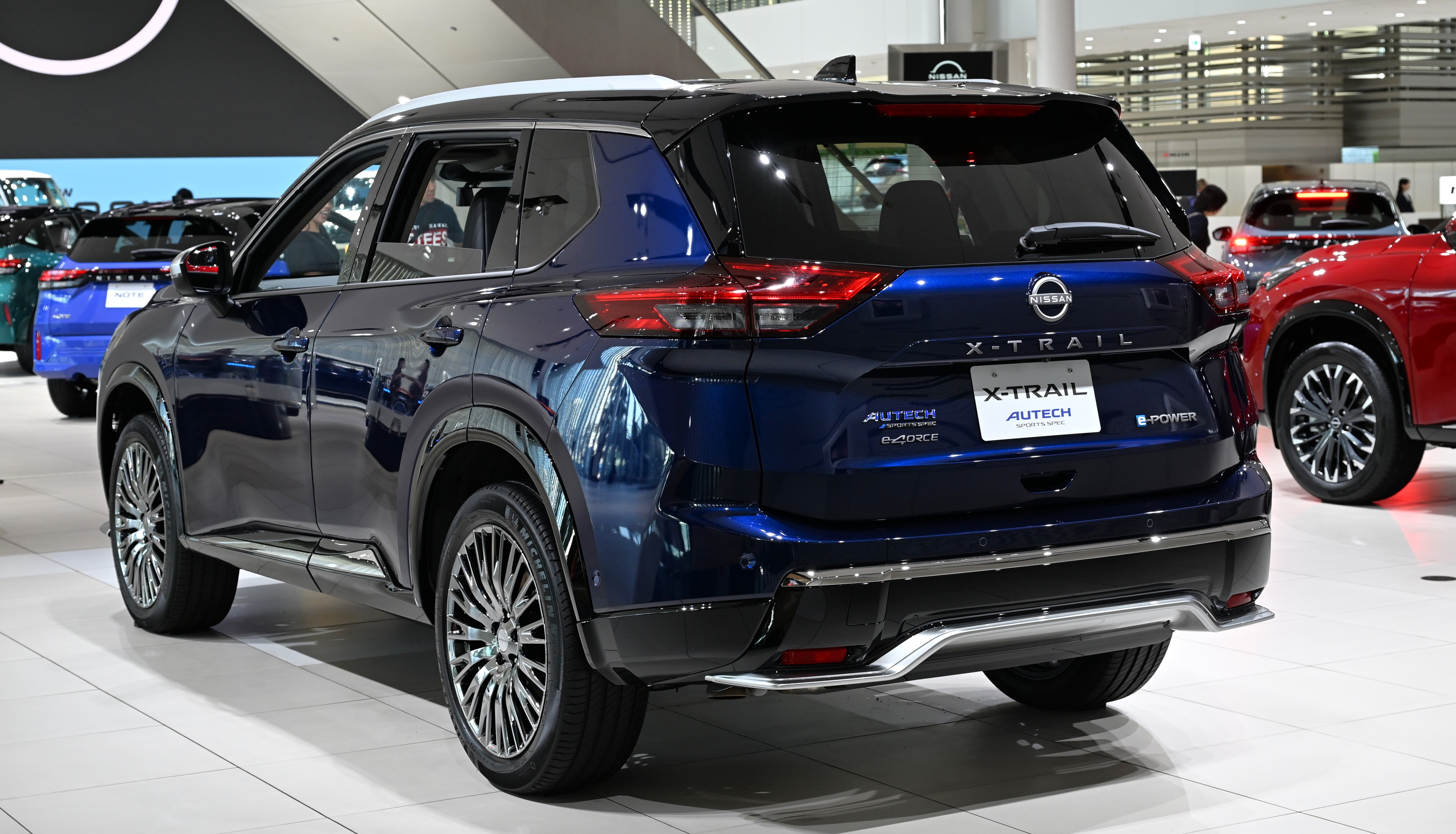
2025 facelift X-Trail Autech Sports (rear)

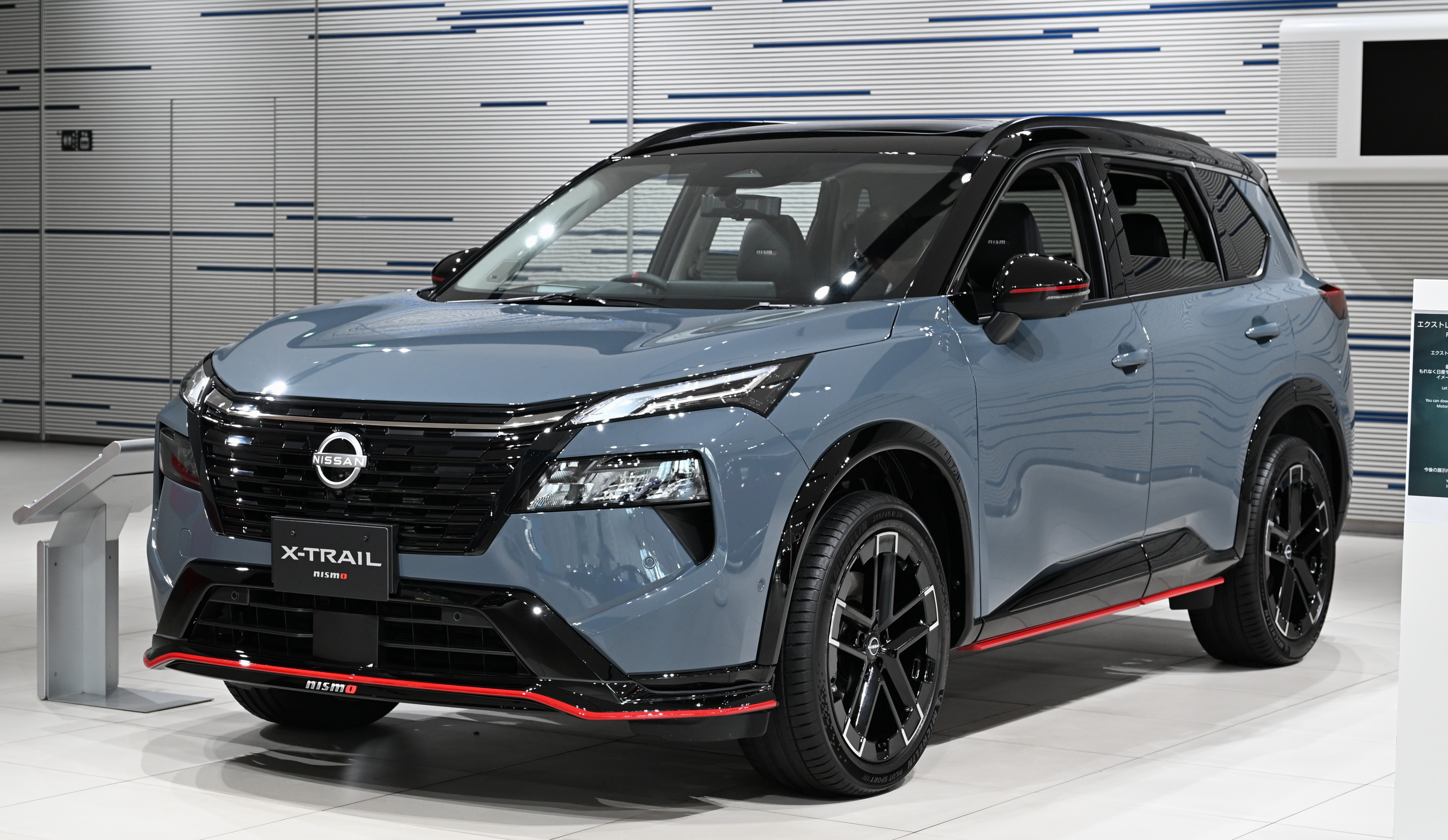
2025 X-Trail Nismo (front)

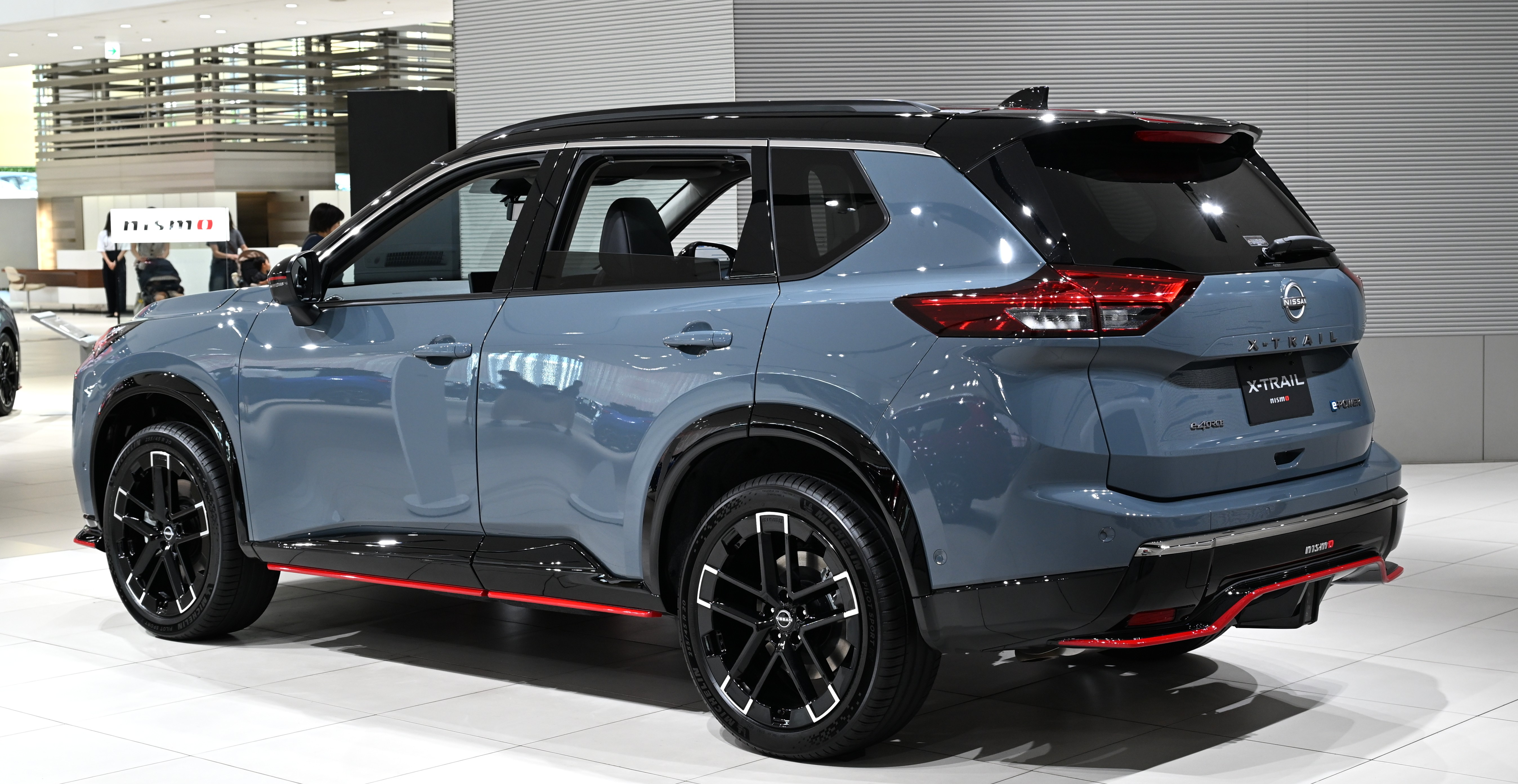
2025 X-Trail Nismo (rear)

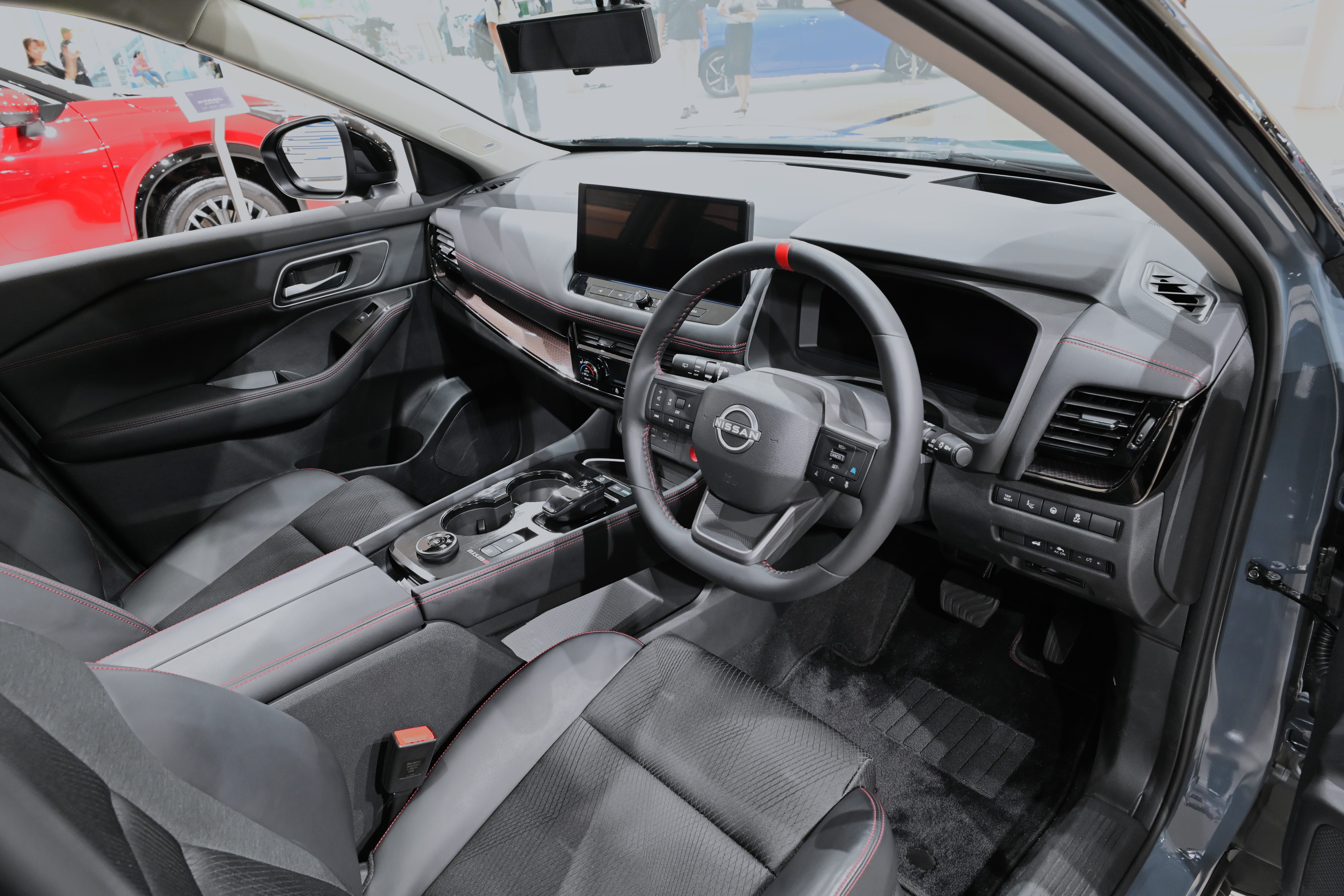
2025 X-Trail Nismo (interior)

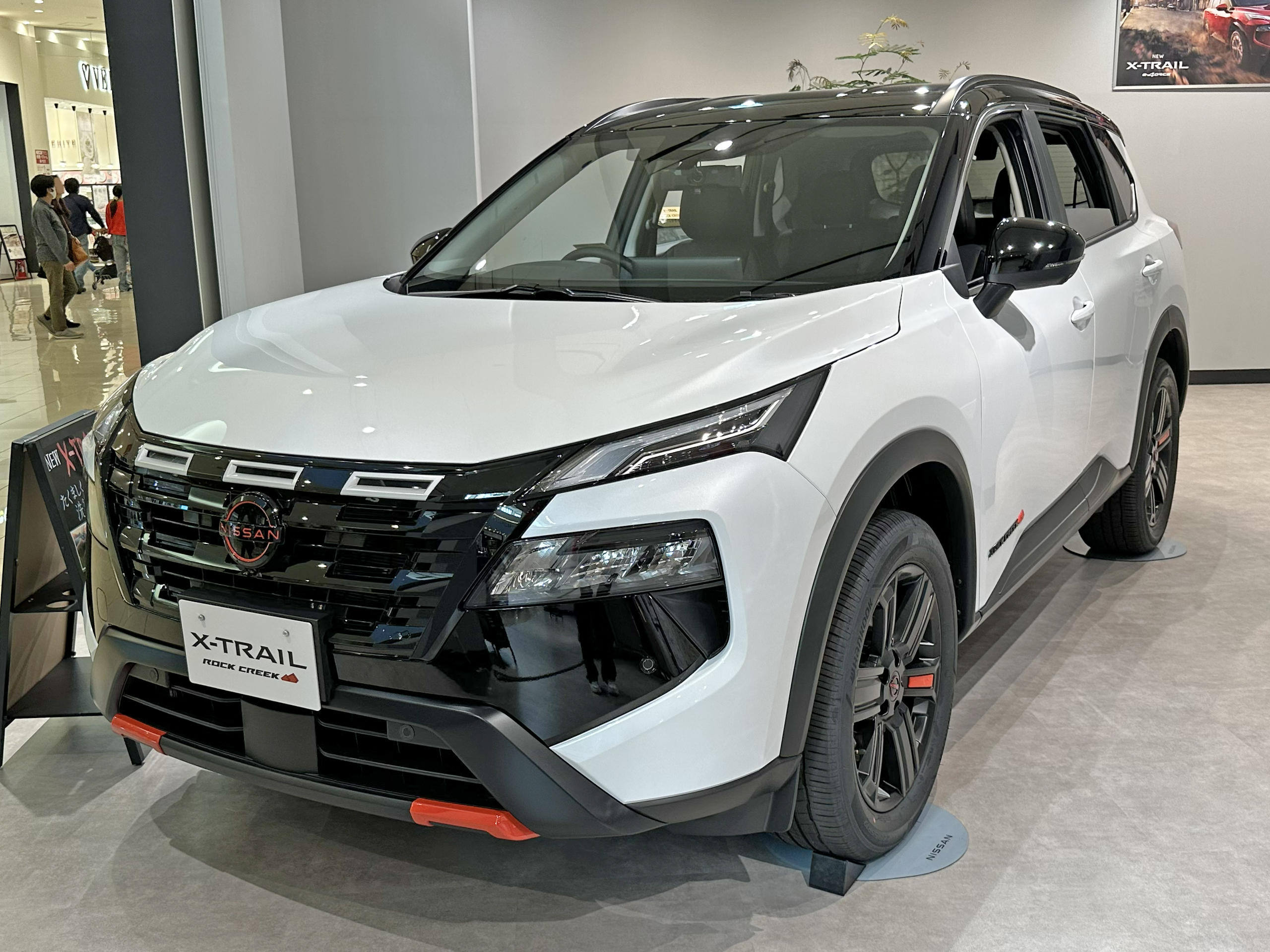
2025 X-Trail Rock Creek (front)

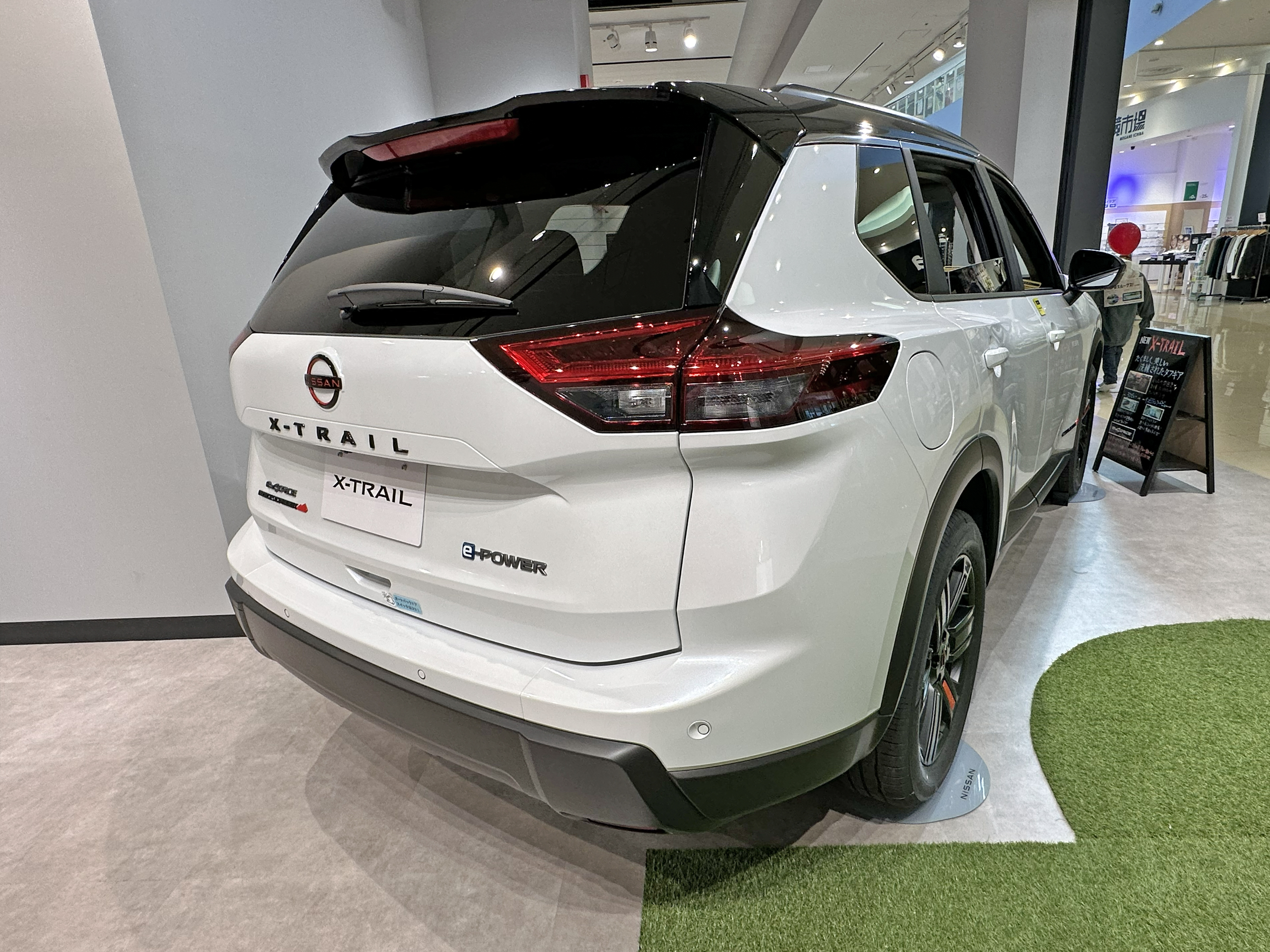
2025 X-Trail Rock Creek (rear)

=== Markets ===
==== Asia ====
===== China =====
The fourth-generation X-Trail (Chinese: 奇骏; pinyin: qí jùn) went on sale at Auto Shanghai 2021 on 19 April 2021.

===== India =====
The fourth-generation X-Trail was showcased in India on 17 July 2024 and was launched on 1 August 2024 in a sole trim powered by a 1.5-litre mild hybrid turbocharged petrol engine.

===== Indonesia =====
The fourth-generation X-Trail was launched in Indonesia on 23 July 2025 at the 32nd Gaikindo Indonesia International Auto Show. It is available in the sole variant, powered by a e-4ORCE series hybrid powertrain.

===== Japan =====
The fourth-generation X-Trail was launched in Japan on 20 July 2022. It is only available with the e-Power series hybrid powertrain. Available trim levels are S, X, and G, with optional "e-4ORCE" electric four-wheel drive, and optional three-row seating for the X 4WD variant. An off-road style accessories package and Autech version is also offered.

===== Laos =====
The fourth-generation X-Trail was launched in Laos on 2 February 2024. Available trim levels are 2WD and AWD with e-4ORCE hybrid powertrain.

===== Philippines =====
The fourth-generation X-Trail was previewed in the Philippines at the 2024 Philippine International Motor Show and the Nissan Festival. It was recognized by the Department of Energy as part of the country’s electrified vehicle lineup. Nissan Philippines had confirmed plans to reintroduce the model as the X-Trail e-Power hybrid around 2026, imported from Japan as a completely built unit (CBU). The fourth-generation X-Trail was launched in the Philippines on 4 June 2026, in the sole e-Power variant.

===== Singapore =====
The fourth-generation X-Trail was launched in Singapore on 11 May 2023 in the sole Prestige trim powered by a e-4ORCE series hybrid powertrain.

===== Taiwan =====
The fourth-generation X-Trail was launched in Taiwan on 14 February 2023. At launch, it is available in the sole variant, powered by an e-4ORCE series hybrid powertrain. The mild hybrid version was introduced on 19 September 2023, with three trim levels: Classic Edition, Navigator Edition and Flagship, powered by the 1.5-litre mild hybrid turbocharged petrol engine.

The facelifted X-Trail was launched in Taiwan on 7 July 2026, with mild hybrid version three trim levels: Pure Edition, Highlights Edition and Ultimate Edition. with a major design difference in the front end compared e-Power version. The e-Power version was introduced on 16 September 2026, it is available in the sole variant.

===== Thailand =====
The fourth-generation X-Trail was launched in Thailand on 28 November 2025. It is available in the sole variant, powered by an e-4ORCE series hybrid powertrain.

==== Europe ====
The fourth-generation Nissan X-Trail for the European market debuted in September 2022. Powertrain options include a 1.5-litre mild hybrid turbocharged petrol engine with variable compression ratio, and an e-Power series hybrid with the dual-motor electric all-wheel drive as an option for the latter.

==== Latin America ====
===== Argentina =====
The fourth-generation X-Trail was launched in Argentina on 11 July 2023, in the sole Exclusive trim, powered by either a 2.5-litre petrol or the e-4ORCE series hybrid powertrain.

In September 2025, the X-Trail line-up was restructured with three variants: Advance, Exclusive and e-Power. For powertrains, the Advance and Exclusive variants use the 2.5-litre petrol, while the e-Power variant use the e-4ORCE series hybrid powertrain.

===== Mexico =====
The fourth-generation X-Trail went on sale in Mexico on 5 December 2022, with four trim levels: Advance, Exclusive, Platinum, and Platinum Plus. All variants powered by a 2.5-litre petrol engine. The Exclusive and Platinum trim levels have the option of a 7-seater configuration. The e-Power series hybrid powertrain available for the Exclusive and Platinum trim levels followed in February 2023.

On 3 June 2026, the facelifted fourth generation X-Trail was launched in Mexico as a 2027 model year vehicle, with the same trim levels as the pre-facelift version which are: Advance, Exclusive, Platinum, and Platinum Plus. All variants continue to be powered by a 2.5-litre petrol engine as the standard powertrain. The electrified e-Power series hybrid powertrain will continue to be available on the Exclusive and Platinum trim levels with the all-wheel drive e-4ORCE being standard on the Platinum e-Power trim level. The Platinum Plus trim level will have the option of a 7-seater configuration while all other trim levels have a 5-seater configuration.

==== Middle East ====
The fourth-generation X-Trail was launched in Middle Eastern markets on 16 January 2023. It is available with a 2.5-liter petrol engine and comes in three trim levels: S, SV, and SL. The S 2WD variant can be configured as a 5-seater, while the S, SV, and SL 4WD variants are offered with a 7-seater option. A new trim level named N-Trek was introduced on 30 April 2024.

==== Oceania ====
===== Australia =====
The fourth-generation X-Trail was introduced in Australia in May 2022. At launch, it is available in ST, ST-L, Ti and Ti-L trim levels and comes standard as a 5-seater configuration with the option of a 7-seater configuration available for ST and ST-L trim levels. All variants are powered by a 2.5-litre petrol engine with 4WD (optional on ST and ST-L, standard on Ti and Ti-L). The e-4ORCE series hybrid powertrain for the Ti and Ti-L followed in early 2023.

The facelifted X-Trail was launched in Australia on 17 February 2026, with trim levels and powertrain options remain unchanged from the pre-facelift model.

===== New Zealand =====
The fourth-generation X-Trail was released in New Zealand in October 2022. At the time of its introduction, it was available in ST, ST-L and Ti-L trim levels with a 5- and 7-seater configurations. All variants are powered by a 2.5-litre petrol engine with 4WD (optional on ST and ST-L, standard on Ti-L). The e-Power series hybrid powertrain available for the ST-L and Ti-L followed in early 2023.

==== South Africa ====
The fourth-generation X-Trail was launched in South Africa on 13 April 2023, in three trim levels: Visia, Acenta and Acenta Plus. All variants are powered by a 2.5-litre petrol engine with all-wheel drive standard on the Acenta Plus.

The facelifted X-Trail was launched in South Africa on 22 July 2026, with trim levels and powertrain option remained unchanged from the pre-facelift model.

=== Safety ===
Euro NCAP test results Nissan X-Trail e-POWER e-4ORCE 2-row (2021)
Test	Points	%
Overall:	5 /5 stars	
Adult occupant:	34.7	91%
Child occupant:	44.3	90%
Pedestrian:	38.2	70%
Safety assist:	15.2	95%

ANCAP test results Nissan X-Trail (2021, aligned with Euro NCAP)
Test	Points	%
Overall:	5 /5 stars	
Adult occupant:	34.66	91%
Child occupant:	44.12	90%
Pedestrian:	40.17	74%
Safety assist:	15.56	97%

TNCAP (1.0) test result Nissan X-Trail 1.5 'Classic' (2024, similar to Euro NCAP 2017)
Test	Points	%
Overall:	4/5 stars	
Adult occupant:	36.576	96%
Child occupant:	33.348	68%
Pedestrian:	30.376	72%
Safety assist:	10.134	84%

== Fifth generation (T34; 2026) ==
Fifth generation

Overview
- Model code: T34
- Also called: Nissan Rogue (US and Canada)
- Production: 2027 (to commence)
- Model years: 2027

Body and chassis
- Platform: Renault–Nissan CMF-CD platform

The fifth-generation X-Trail (fourth-generation Rogue) was unveiled alongside the next-generation Juke on 14 April 2026.

== Sales ==
Year	Europe	Japan	China	Thailand	Mexico	Australia	Indonesia
2001	9,019	42,867			1,240	1,096	71
2002	30,811	31,199			8,667	9,886	350
2003	43,171	29,981			14,387		3,394
2004	57,770	30,846			18,077	13,050	7,131
2005	52,398	28,851			16,701	12,072	6,192
2006	40,543	20,780			15,069	11,331	1,817
2007	29,551	27,875			9,567	12,444	2,846
2008	24,401	31,710	4,166		9,347	9,794	3,698
2009	12,908	32,627	5,505		5,657	7,875	4,528
2010	7,430	36,898	32,011		6,290	9,792	4,682
2011	9,256	25,114	28,264		4,966	12,089	3,179
2012	8,222	28,325	22,869		5,946	16,066	2,438
2013	5,811	28,198	15,327		6,021		1,558
2014	16,178	53,736	114,459	574	11,682		4,112
2015	40,243	58,448	166,385	6,755	25,668	17,971	7,705
2016	60,444	56,151	180,202	2,824	30,488	18,903	6,899
2017	69,833	49,873	184,612	2,094	25,645	18,195	2,626
2018	76,004	50,304	207,951	1,594	19,161	21,192	928
2019	56,754	36,505	207,776	1,218	13,415	19,726	580
2020	43,392	20,280	163,095	908	7,603	14,291	176
2021	36,000	12,016	79,449		7,465	13,860	20
2022	10,618	18,066	27,715		5,637	7,943	38
2023	32,284	27,129	53,693		12,931	12,861	0
2024		31,776	35,146		15,491	17,494	0
2025			32,024		16,142	15,708	85
