= Renault Kadjar =

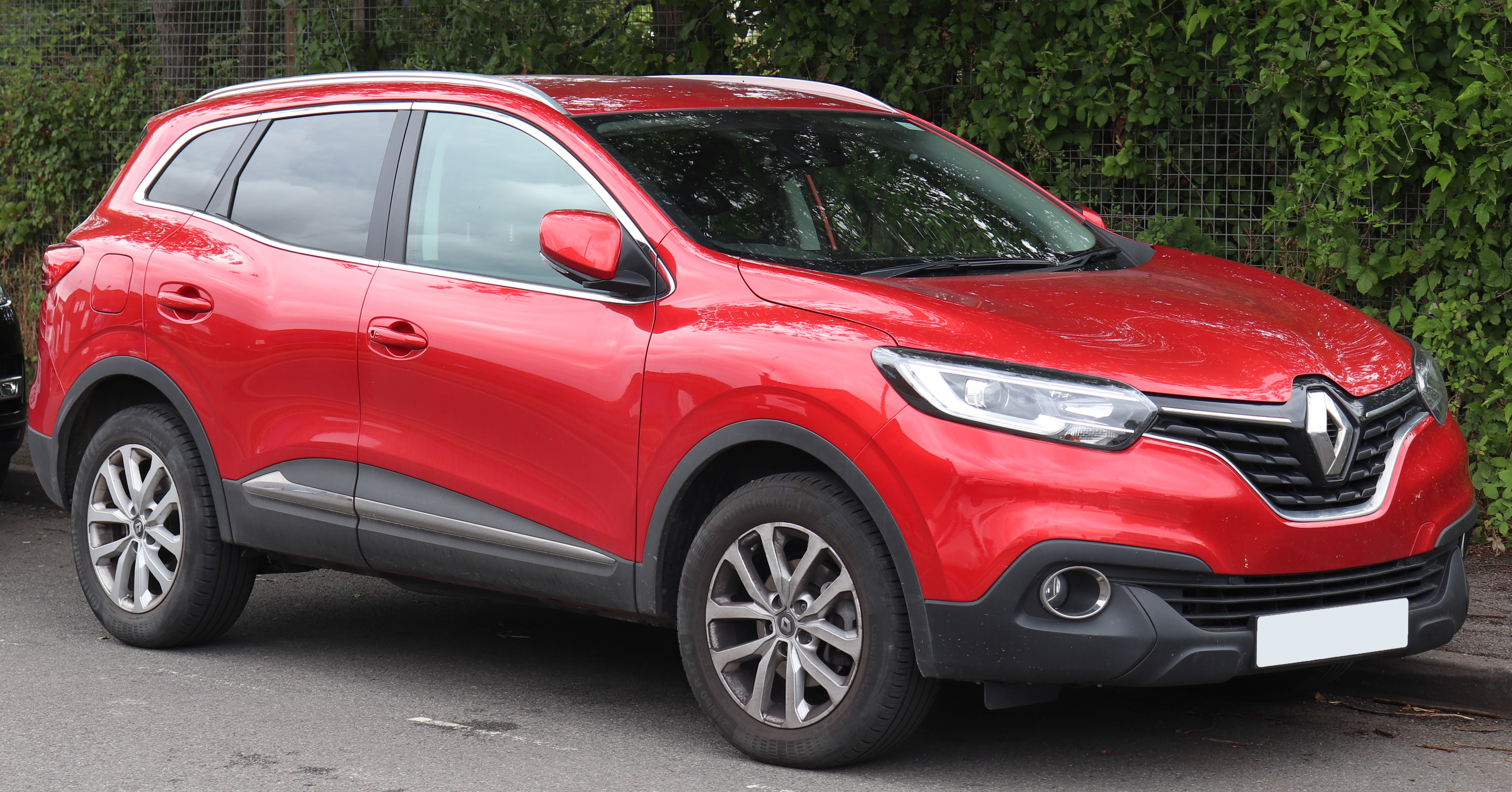
- 2016 Renault Kadjar Dynamique 1.5 dCi

Overview
- Manufacturer: Renault
- Production: 2015–2022; 2016–2020 (China)
- Assembly: Spain: Palencia (Renault Spain); China: Wuhan (Dongfeng Renault)
- Designer: Victor Sfiazof

Body and chassis
- Class: Compact crossover SUV (C)
- Body style: 5-door SUV
- Layout: Front-engine, front-wheel-drive or all-wheel-drive
- Platform: Renault–Nissan CMF-CD platform
- Related: Nissan Qashqai/Rogue Sport (J11); Renault Espace V Renault Mégane IV; Renault Talisman; Jinbei Konect

Powertrain
- Engine: Petrol: 1.2 L H5Ft I4 turbo; 1.3 L H5Ht I4 turbo; 1.6 L M5M/MR16DDT I4 turbo; 2.0 L M4R I4 (China); Diesel: 1.5 L K9K turbo; 1.6 L R9M I4 turbo; 1.7 L R9N I4 turbo
- Transmission: 6-speed manual 7-speed 7DCT300 EDC automatic CVT (China)

Dimensions
- Wheelbase: 2,647 mm (104.2 in)
- Length: 4,450 mm (175.2 in)
- Width: 1,840 mm (72.4 in)
- Height: 1,600 mm (63.0 in)

Chronology
- Successor: Renault Austral

The Renault Kadjar is a compact crossover SUV (C-segment) manufactured and marketed by Renault. It was revealed at the 2015 Geneva Motor Show, with sales starting in April 2015 in Europe, and in 2016 in China.

The Kadjar was superseded by the Renault Austral which commenced production in 2022, and utilises only E-Tech mild hybrid or full hybrid petrol drivetrains.

== Naming ==
Renault claims the Kadjar name is based on two words: Kad is inspired by quad to represent a go anywhere four wheeled vehicle, and Jar recalls the French words agile and jaillir respectively representing agility and suddenly emerging from somewhere.

Renault published a more elaborate explanation of the name Kadjar in the blog section of their corporate web site. However, its relation to Qashqai points to its relation to the Qajars or in French Kadjars.

Since Nasser ed-Din Shah, the ruler of Qajar dynasty, wrote their name in western script in the French way: Kadjar. This relation has been noted in several professional and social media in prevalently neutral, but in few cases, a bit enthusiastic manner. There were also rare bursts of politically based outrage.

According to two Iranian sources, Mozaffar ad-Din Shah Qajar King of Iran (1853–1907), acquired two Renault cars in Belgium in 1900 while on his trip in Europe, and had them delivered to Iran. These were to be the first automobiles in Iran.

== Overview ==
The Kadjar shares the same Renault–Nissan Common Module Family platform as the Nissan Qashqai, which will allow for front and four wheel drive.

It is offered with the latest version of Renault's R Link 2 infotainment system (voice control, navigation, Bluetooth and radio), engine stop start, emergency brake assist, lane departure warning and traffic sign recognition with speed limit alerts, 360 degree sensors, reversing camera, and a hands free parking system.

The car received a facelift in 2018, with production of the remodeled car starting some time the following year. With four new engines to replace the old, a change to the exterior design and an updated interior with more space for items, updated infotainment system and some small changes to the climate control.

Kadjar production stopped in mid-July 2022, after 685,261 units produced at the Palencia and Wuhan sites.

== Engines ==
Petrol engines
| Model | Year(s) | Displacement | Fuel type | Power | Torque | 0–100 km/h (0–62 mph) | CO2 Emissions |
|---|---|---|---|---|---|---|---|
| TCe 130 | 2015–2018 | 1,197 cc (73.0 cu in) | Petrol | 131 PS (96 kW; 129 bhp) | 205 N⋅m (151 ft⋅lb_{f}) | 10.1 s | 126 g/km |
| TCe 160 | 2017–2018 | 1,618 cc (98.7 cu in) | Petrol | 163 PS (120 kW; 161 bhp) | 240 N⋅m (177 ft⋅lb_{f}) | 9.2 s | 134 g/km |
| TCe 140 | 2018–2022 | 1,332 cc (81.3 cu in) | Petrol | 140 PS (103 kW; 138 bhp) | 240 N⋅m (177 ft⋅lb_{f}) | 10.4 s | 134 g/km |
| TCe 159 | 2018–2022 | 1,332 cc (81.3 cu in) | Petrol | 159 PS (117 kW; 157 bhp) | 260 N⋅m (192 ft⋅lb_{f}) | 9.4 s | 134 g/km |

The cylinder head of the 1.3L direct-injection turbo petrol motor was designed by Daimler, utilising a rare compact triangular "Delta" design. It incorporates a bore spray coating, a petrol particulate filter in the exhaust system, and the Mercedes application in the A-Class adds cylinder deactivation.

Diesel engines
| Model | Year(s) | Displacement | Fuel type | Power | Torque | 0–100 km/h (0–62 mph) | CO2 Emissions |
|---|---|---|---|---|---|---|---|
| dCi 110 | 2015–2018 | 1,461 cc (89.2 cu in) | Diesel | 110 PS (81 kW; 108 bhp) | 260 N⋅m (192 ft⋅lb_{f}) | 11.9 s | 99 g/km |
| dCi 110 EDC | 2015–2018 | 1,461 cc (89.2 cu in) | Diesel | 110 PS (81 kW; 108 bhp) | 250 N⋅m (184 ft⋅lb_{f}) | 11.7 s | 99 g/km |
| dCi 130 | 2015–2018 | 1,598 cc (97.5 cu in) | Diesel | 131 PS (96 kW; 129 bhp) | 320 N⋅m (236 ft⋅lb_{f}) | 9.9 s | 113 g/km |
| dCi 130 4x4 | 2015–2018 | 1,598 cc (97.5 cu in) | Diesel | 131 PS (96 kW; 129 bhp) | 320 N⋅m (236 ft⋅lb_{f}) | 10.5 s | 126 g/km |
| dCi 115 | 2018–2022 | 1,461 cc (89.2 cu in) | Diesel | 115 PS (85 kW; 113 bhp) | 270 N⋅m (199 ft⋅lb_{f}) | 11.7 s | 113 g/km |
| dCi 150 | 2018–2022 | 1,749 cc (106.7 cu in) | Diesel | 150 PS (110 kW; 148 bhp) | 340 N⋅m (251 ft⋅lb_{f}) | – | – |

Prompted by the Volkswagen emissions scandal, the German motor authority found many cars not complying with the requirements of the emission laws. The Kadjar's diesel dCi 110 and dCi 130 (2015-2018) engines were measured to have a NO_{x} emission level of approximately 1.5 g/km, almost twenty times the Euro 6 limit of 80 mg/km.

== Gallery ==
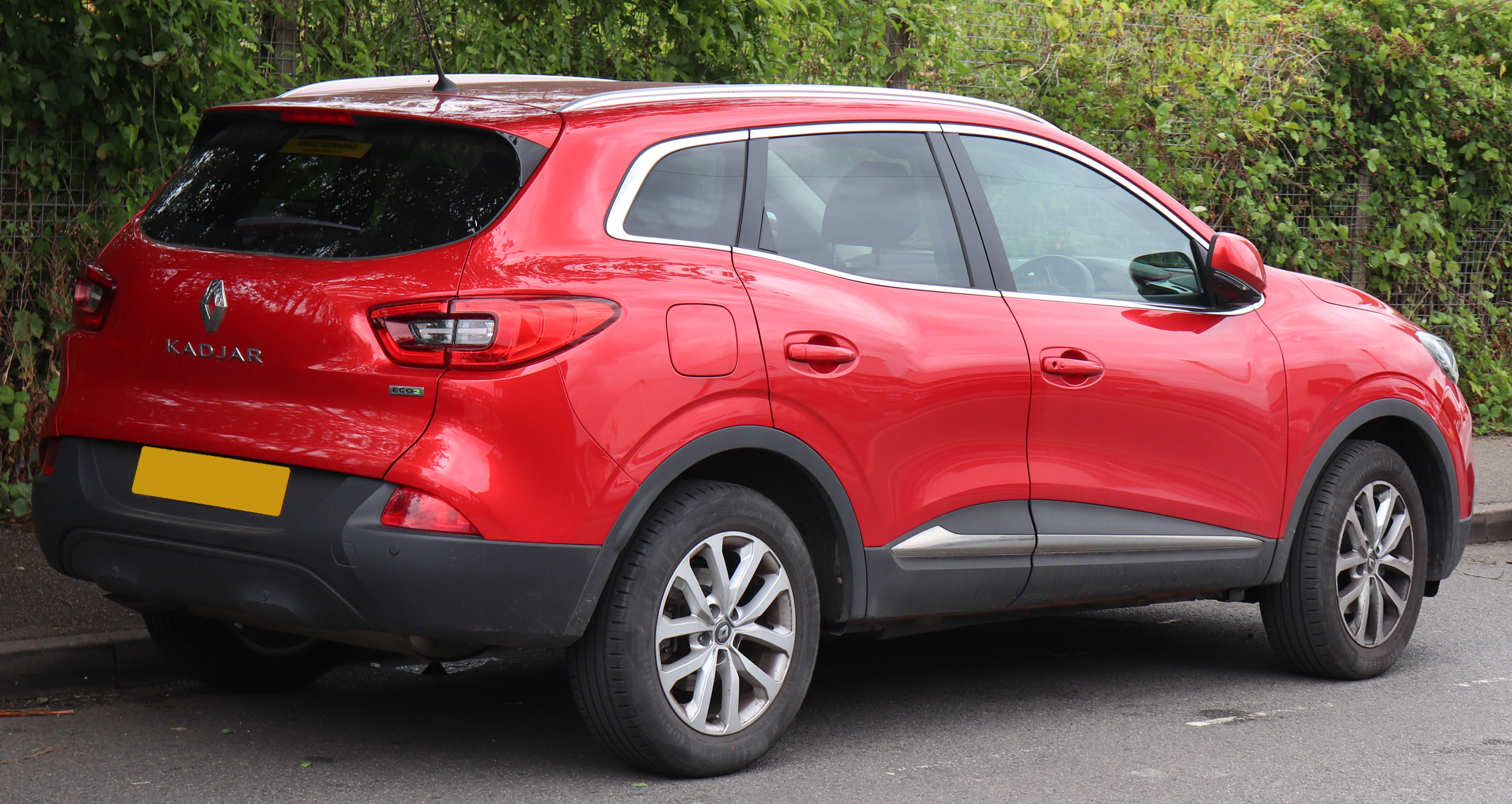
Rear view (pre-facelift)

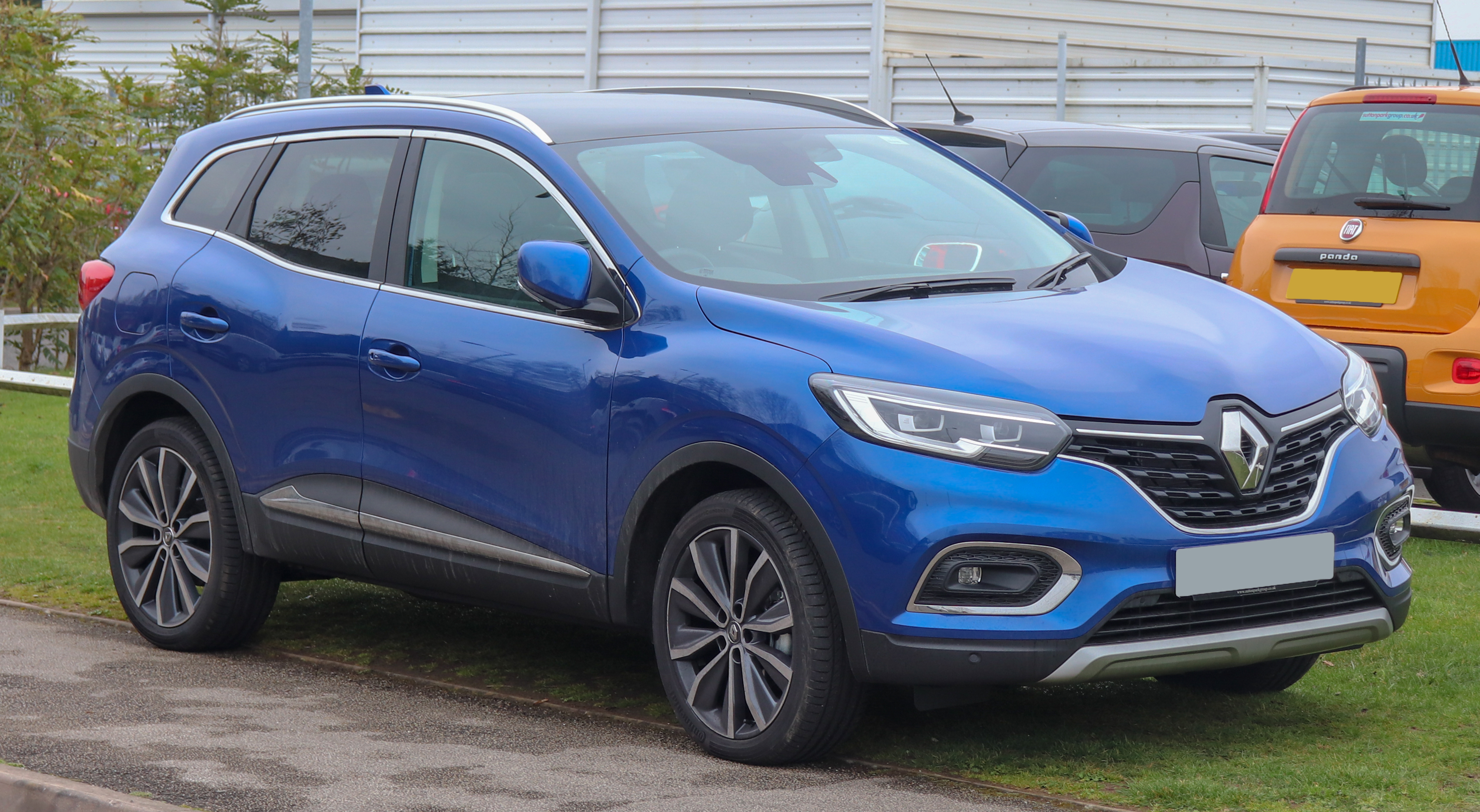
Renault Kadjar (facelift)

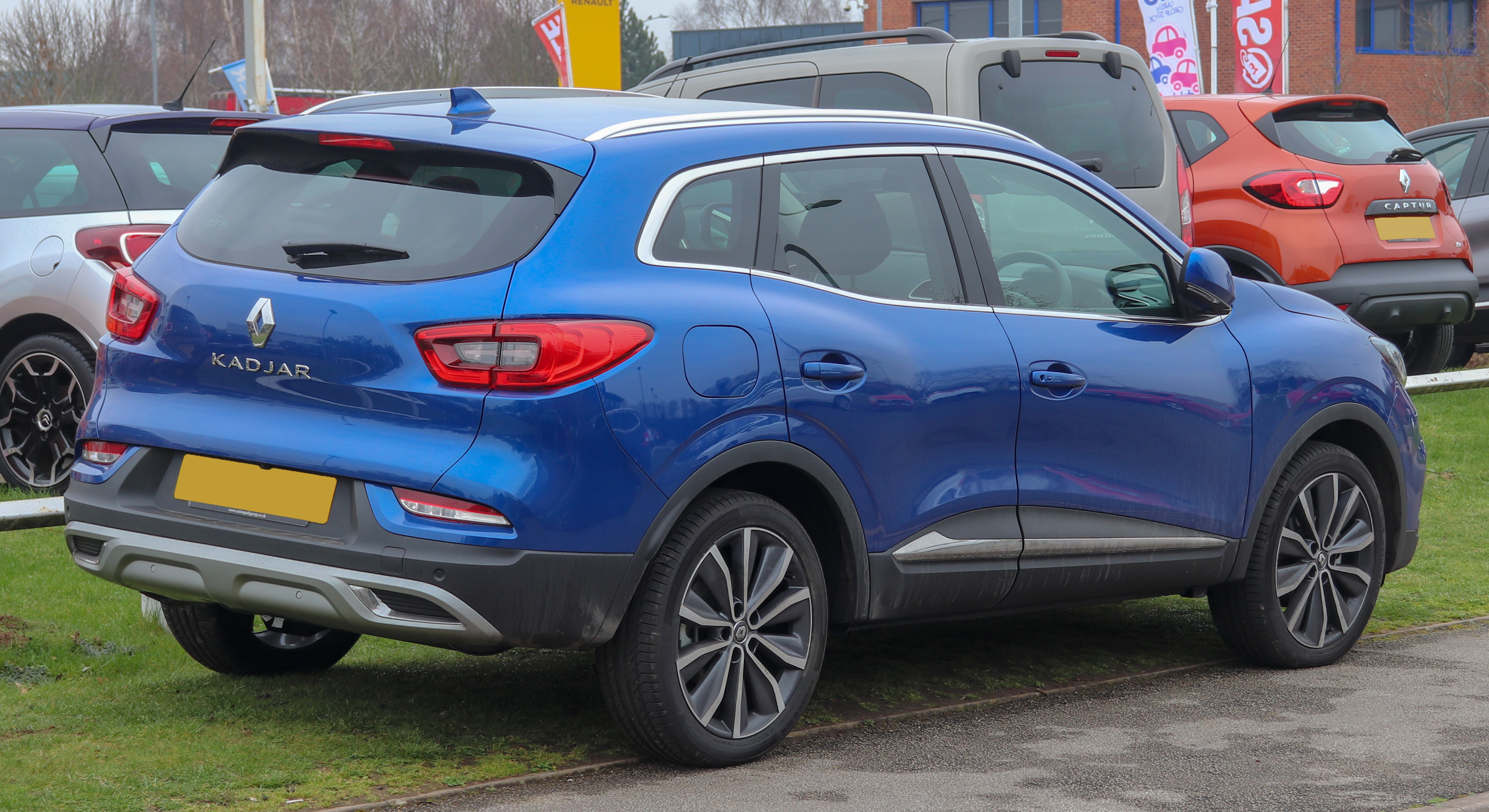
Rear view (facelift)

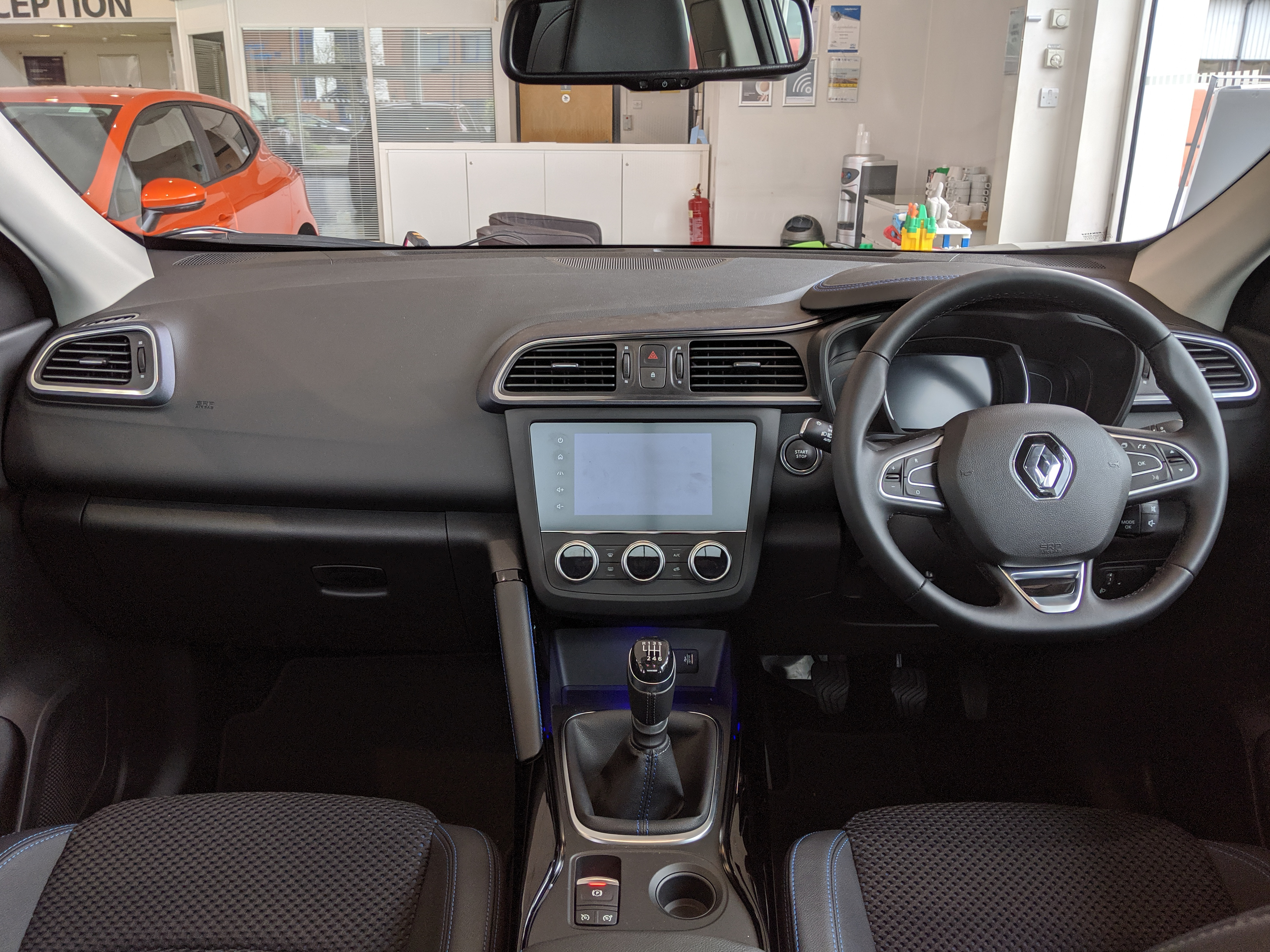
Interior (facelift)

== Safety ==
The Renault Kadjar has received a five-star Euro NCAP rating in 2015.

== Sales ==
| Year | Europe | China | Australia |
|---|---|---|---|
| 2015 | 49,520 | | |
| 2016 | 130,090 | 23,999 | |
| 2017 | 111,705 | 25,900 | |
| 2018 | 99,980 | 17,503 | |
| 2019 | 110,013 | 5,984 | 132 |
| 2020 | 63,685 | 181 | 500 |
| 2021 | 33,318 | | |

685,261 Kadjar's have been produced overall.
