= Nissan MR engine =

Kind of engine made by Nissan

Renault-Nissan MR engine
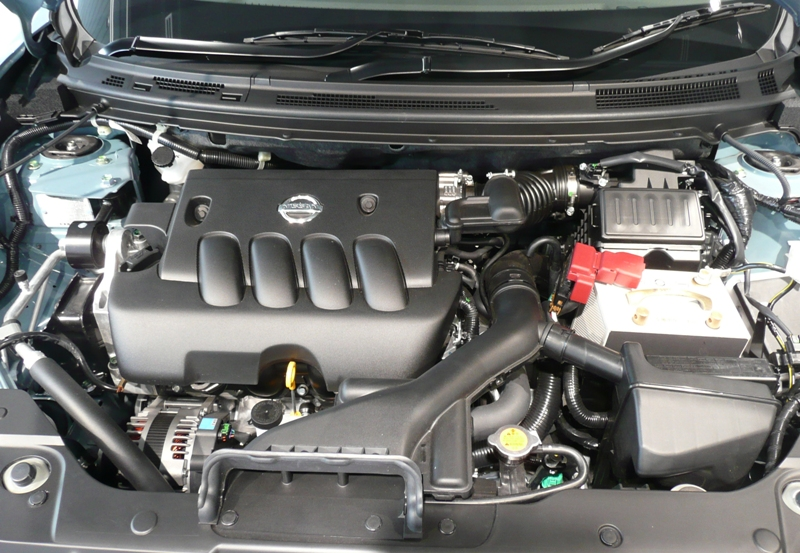
- MR20DE

Overview
- Manufacturer: Nissan Motors and Renault
- Production: 2004–present

Layout
- Configuration: Inline-3; Inline-4
- Displacement: 1.5 L (1499 cc); 1.6 L (1618 cc); 1.8 L (1798 cc); 2.0 L (1997 cc)
- Cylinder bore: 79.7 mm (3.14 in); 84 mm (3.31 in)
- Piston stroke: 81.1 mm (3.19 in); 90.1 mm (3.55 in); 100.2 mm (3.94 in)
- Cylinder block material: Aluminum alloy
- Cylinder head material: Aluminum alloy
- Valvetrain: DOHC 4 valves x cyl. with VVT
- Compression ratio: 9.5:1, 9.9:1

Combustion
- Turbocharger: In some versions
- Fuel system: Fuel injection Direct injection
- Fuel type: Gasoline (all except M9R / M9T); Diesel (M9R / M9T)
- Cooling system: Water-cooled

Output
- Power output: 124–300 PS (91–221 kW; 122–296 hp)
- Torque output: 174–285 N⋅m (128–210 lb⋅ft)

Chronology
- Predecessor: Nissan SR engine Renault F-Type engine

The Renault-Nissan MR engine family consists of three and four-cylinder, all-aluminium and water cooled automobile engines with variable valve timing, initially developed by Renault and Nissan, and also Mercedes-Benz since 2010 in the case of the M9T/OM699. They all have four valves per cylinder. Renault calls this engine family the M engine. Other noteworthy features of this engine family include acoustically equal runner lengths and a tumble control valve for the intake manifold, a "silent" timing chain, mirror finished crankshaft and camshaft journals, and offset cylinder placement in an attempt for increased efficiency.

The MR engine family features 'under stress' manufacture, meaning while the block is being bored, a torque plate puts the block under stress. The block becomes temporarily distorted until the head is torqued onto it, at which point the block is pulled into the correct shape.

== MR15DDT ==
Third generation E-power hybrid, three-cylinder engine displacing 1.5 L (1,499 cc). This retains the MR16's 79.7 mm (3.14 in) bore, combined with a much longer stroke of 100.2 mm (3.94 in). As the engine is only designed to charge the battery, throttle response and other drivability issues were of little concern, allowing the engineers to focus only on thermal efficiency. While turbocharged, it has a very high compression ratio of 13.5 to 1.

Applications:

- 2025- Nissan Qashqai ZR15DDTe engine

== MR16DDT (Renault M5Mt) ==
The MR16DDT is a 1.6 L (1618 cc) DIG-T (Direct Injection Gasoline-Turbocharged) inline-four 16-valve engine, with a bore x stroke of 79.7 mm × 81.1 mm (3.14 in × 3.19 in). It was first introduced in the Nissan Juke small SUV in the autumn of 2010. Output is 140 kW; 187 hp (190 PS) and 240 N⋅m (177 lb⋅ft) of torque. The 2014 Juke NISMO RS FWD produced 158 kW; 212 hp (215 PS) and 285 N⋅m (210 lb⋅ft). In 2015, the Nissan Teana received this 1.6 Turbo as a replacement for the earlier 2.0-liter naturally aspirated engine. In 2013, it entered Renault's lineup in the Sport Clio as the M5Mt, where it generates 147 kW; 197 hp (200 PS) and 240 N⋅m (177 lb⋅ft).

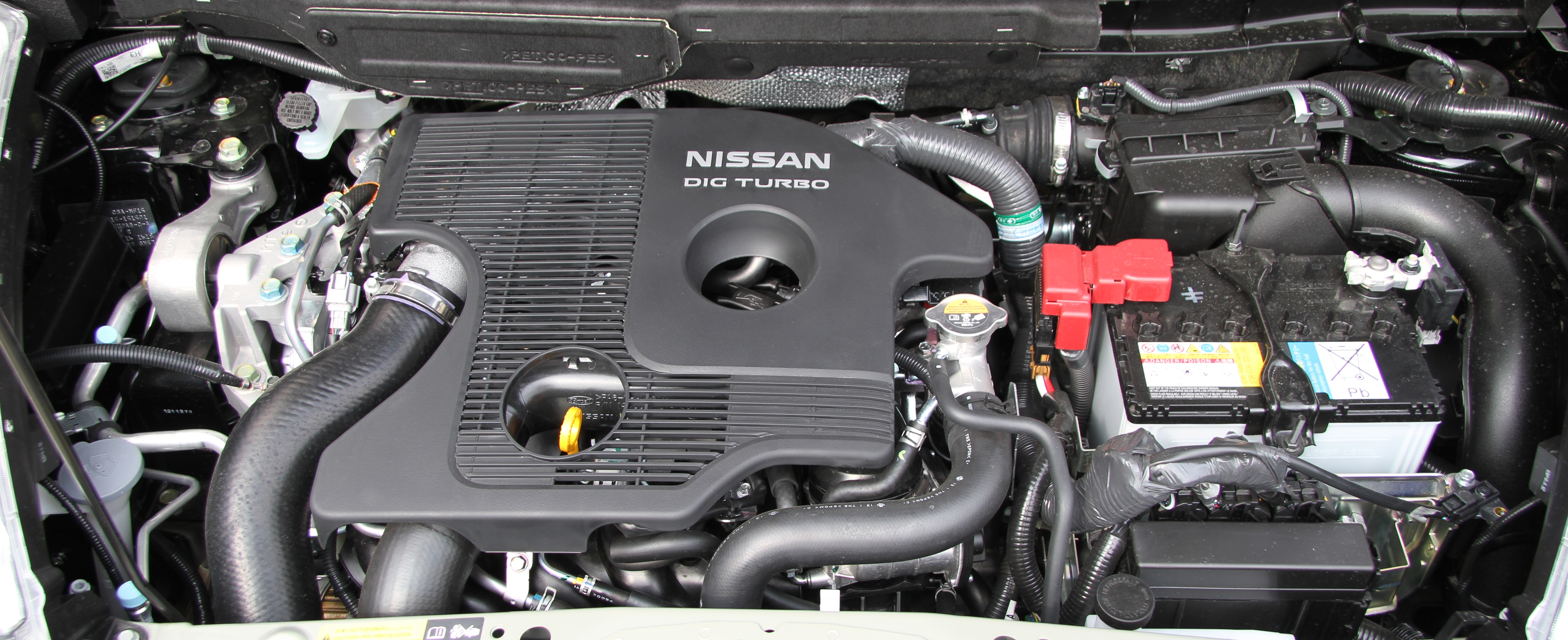
MR16DDT

Some of the pertinent features of the MR16DDT are:

- Twin variable valve timing control (CVTCS on intake and exhaust valves)
- Turbo-charged and intercooled
- Compression ratio of 9.5:1
- Lightweight design and reduced frictions

Applications:

- 2011–2019 Nissan Juke 140 kW; 187 hp (190 PS)
- 2013–2015 Nissan Juke NISMO (V1 Engine) 147 kW; 197 hp (200 PS)
- 2014–2019 Nissan Juke NISMO RS FWD 158 kW; 212 hp (215 PS) and 285 N⋅m (210 lb⋅ft) of torque
- 2013–2023 Nissan Tiida (hatchback)/Nissan Pulsar/Nissan Sylphy
- 2012 Nissan Deltawing Race car (not production) (221 kW; 296 hp (300 PS) at 7400 rpm)
- 2013–2023 Renault Sport Clio 147 kW; 197 hp (200 PS) and 177 N⋅m (131 lb⋅ft) of torque
- 2015–2023 Renault Sport Clio TROPHY 162 kW; 217 hp (220 PS) and 210 N⋅m (155 lb⋅ft)
- 2013–2019 Renault Samsung SM5 TCe
- 2015–2022 Nissan X-Trail (120 kW; 163 PS (161 hp))
- 2015–2018 Nissan Teana L33 140 kW; 187 hp (190 PS)
- 2015–2022 Renault Talisman TCE 110 kW; 148 hp (150 PS) or 147 kW; 197 hp (200 PS)
- 2016–2024 Renault Korea Motors SM6 TCE 140 kW; 187 hp (190 PS)
- 2016–2024 Renault Mégane GT 151 kW; 202 hp (205 PS)
- 2017–2019 Nissan Sentra SR Turbo & NISMO 140 kW; 187 hp (190 PS)
- 2017–2018 Renault Kadjar TCe 160

== MR18DE ==
The MR18DE is a 1.8 L (1798 cc) version with bore and stroke of 84 mm × 81.1 mm (3.31 in × 3.19 in) and a power of 96 kW; 128 hp (130 PS), developed by Nissan, and first installed in the Nissan Tiida in 2004.

In North America the output is 91 kW; 124 PS (122 hp) at 5500 rpm and 174 N⋅m (128 lb⋅ft) at 4800 rpm.

From July 6, 2006, this engine is also fitted to Nissan Livina Geniss for China version and the Nissan Grand Livina for Indonesia and Malaysia. Output is 93 kW; 124 hp (126 PS) at 5200 rpm and 174 N⋅m (128 lb⋅ft) at 4800 rpm.

For Brazil, this engine is fitted to the Tiida and Livina ranges, with Flex-fuel capability.

Applications:

- 2004–2012 Nissan Tiida/Versa
- 2006–2019 Nissan Grand Livina
- 2006–present Nissan Wingroad
- 2009–2014 Nissan Cube

== MRA8DE ==
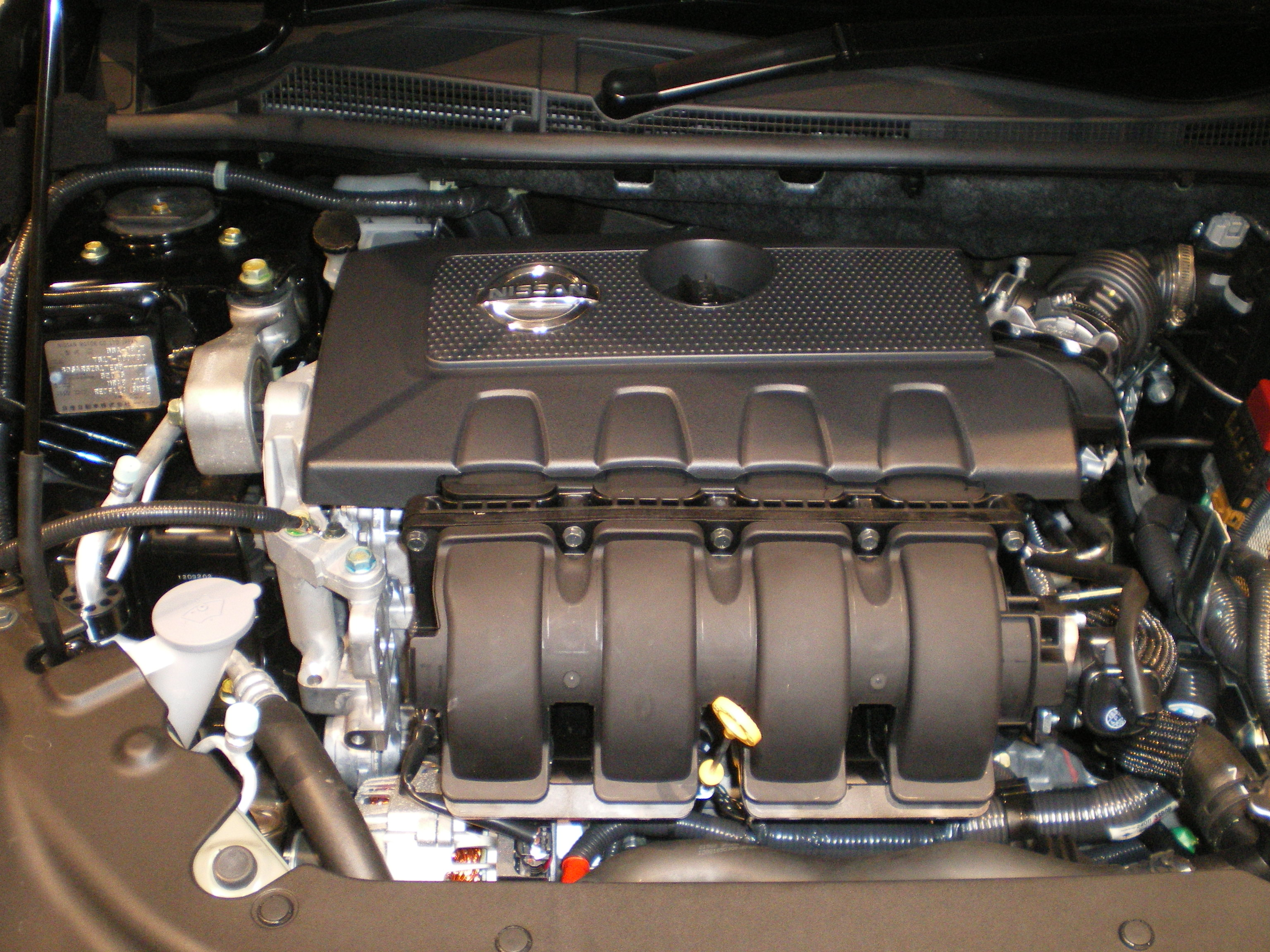
MRA8DE engine

The MRA8DE is a 1.8 L (1797 cc) engine, different from the MR18DE as it has a twin variable valve timing system on both the intake and exhaust valves and uses a diamond-like carbon coating. Bore and stroke is 79.7 mm × 90.1 mm (3.14 in × 3.55 in). It produces 96 kW; 128 hp (130 PS) at 6000 rpm and 174 N⋅m (128 lb⋅ft) at 3600 rpm, and has a compression ratio of 9.9:1.

Applications:

- 2013–2019 Nissan Sylphy B17 (Asian)/Nissan Sentra (North America and Middle east)/Nissan Pulsar (Australasia)

== MR18DDT (Renault M5Pt) ==
The MR18DDT is a 1.8 L (1797 cc) engine, different from the MR18DE and MRA8DE as it has a turbocharged, twin variable valve timing system on both the intake and exhaust valves and uses a diamond-like carbon coating. Bore and stroke is 79.7 mm × 90.1 mm (3.14 in × 3.55 in). It produces 165–221 kW; 222–296 hp (225–300 PS) at 6000 rpm and 300–420 N⋅m (221–310 lb⋅ft) at 3600 rpm, and has a compression ratio of 9.0:1. It is used in the Renault and Alpine vehicles since 2015, where it is named M5Pt.

Applications:

- 2015–2023 Renault Espace V Energy TCe 225 EDC7
- 2015–2022 Renault Talisman
- 2017–2022 Renault Megane IV RS280 (Sport and Cup), Megane R.S. 300 Trophy
- 2017–present Alpine A110 (2017)
  - 2024-present Zagato AGTZ Twin Tail

== MR20DE (Renault M4R) ==
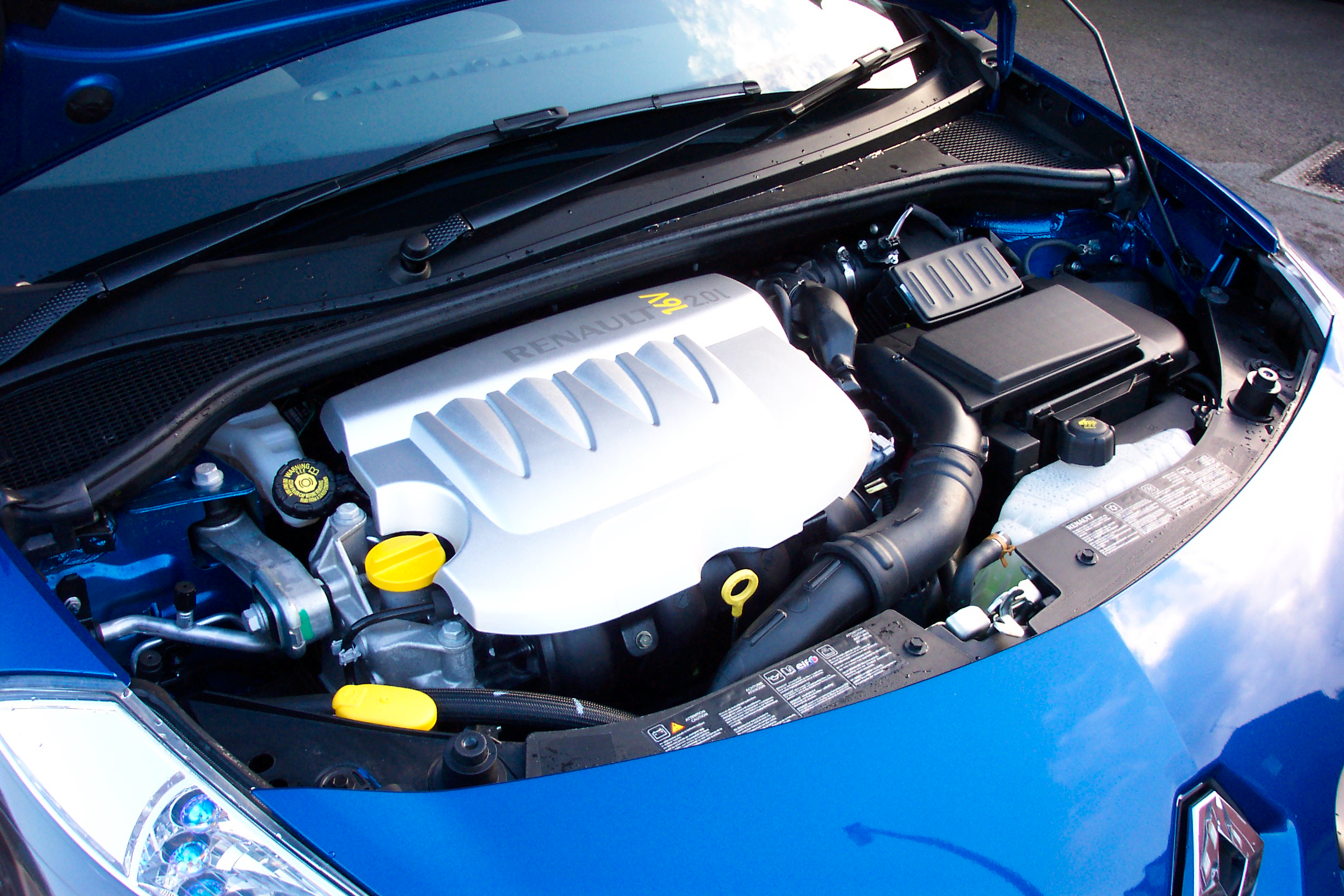
MR20DE installed (as an M4R) in a Renault Clio III

The MR20DE, a 2.0 L (1997 cc) engine, was the first MR series engine developed by Nissan as a replacement for the QR20DE. It is an undersquare engine, its bore and stroke being 84 mm × 90.1 mm (3.31 in × 3.55 in), respectively. It was first introduced in the Lafesta and Serena MPVs and Renault Samsung SM5 in early 2005. In November 2006, it entered Renault's lineup in the Clio III as the M4R, where it generates 108 kW; 145 hp (147 PS).

This engine is available with Nissan's XTRONIC CVT continuously variable transmission in several applications.

A detuned version, with 98 kW; 131 hp (133 PS) instead of 108 kW; 145 hp (147 PS), was added to the new Bluebird Sylphy in late 2006. In the new Nissan X-Trail, Qashqai and C-Platform Sentra, the MR20DE produces 108 kW; 145 hp (147 PS) at 5100 rpm and 199 N⋅m (147 lb⋅ft) of torque at 4800 rpm. Middle East version of the MR20DE engine that goes in the Nissan Qashqai produces 110 kW; 148 hp (150 PS) at 5200 rpm and 200 N⋅m (148 lb⋅ft) of torque at 4400 rpm.

Applications:

- 2005–2010 Nissan Serena
- 2005–present Renault Samsung SM5
- 2005–2012 Nissan Bluebird Sylphy
- 2006–present Renault Clio
- 2007–2019 Nissan X-Trail
- 2007–present Nissan Qashqai
- 2007–2012 Nissan Sentra
- 2007–2015 Renault Laguna
- 2008–2014 Nissan Teana(J32)
- 2008–present Renault Safrane
- 2008–2016 Renault Mégane(III)
- 2009–present Renault Scénic
- 2009–present Renault Fluence
- 2014–2016 Renault Koleos (First generation)
- 2009–present Renault Samsung SM3
- 2009–present Renault Latitude
- 2013–present Nissan NV200
- 2013–present Nissan Sentra (Brazil only - Flex Fuel (gasoline and ethanol)
- 2015–present Renault Kadjar (China)

== MR20DD (Renault M5R) ==
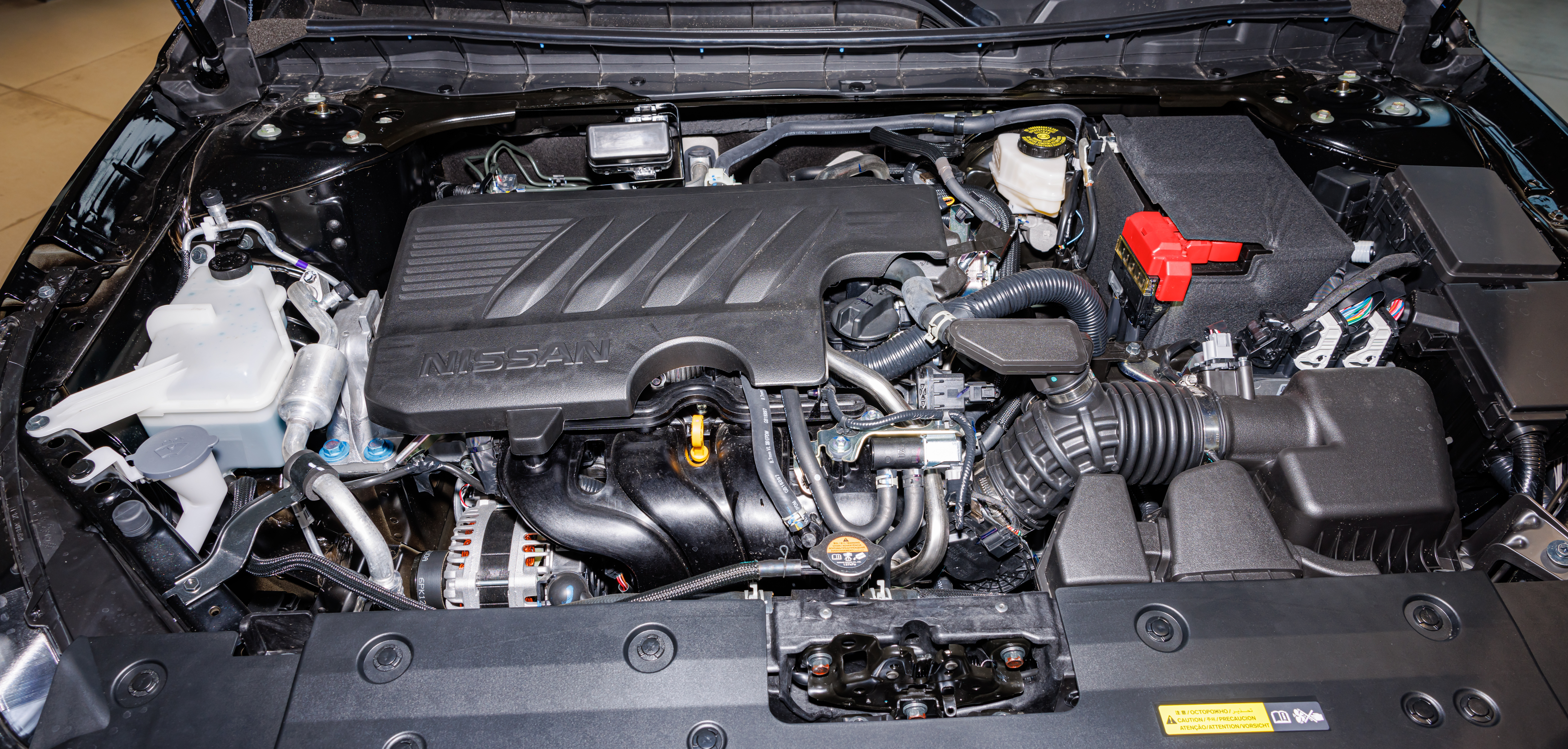
MR20DD Engine in a Nissan Altima (L34, China)

The MR20DD is a 2.0 L (1997 cc) engine developed by Nissan with direct injection and twin variable valve timing control. The MR20DD engine is "SU-LEV" certified in Japan, and produces 108 kW (145 hp; 147 PS) at 5600 rpm and 155 lb⋅ft (210 N⋅m) of torque at 4400 rpm in its first permutation, with a 11.2:1 compression ratio. Export models claim 102 kW (137 hp; 139 PS) at 5200 rpm and 147 lb⋅ft (199 N⋅m) at 4400 rpm.

In 2016, it entered Renault's lineup in the Koleos II as the M5R, and is also in the eight generation Sentra, where it produces 148 hp (110 kW; 150 PS) at 6400 rpm and 146 lb⋅ft (198 N⋅m) at 4400 rpm with a compression ratio of 10.6:1.

The Australian & New Zealand market Nissan Qashqai ST and Ti models use a variant of the MR20DD which achieves 106 kW (142 hp; 144 PS) at 6000 rpm and 200 N⋅m (148 lb⋅ft) at 4400 rpm and a compression ratio of 11.2:1. In the Nissan Rogue Sport and second generation Kicks, a similar version produces 141 hp (105 kW; 143 PS) at 6000 rpm and 140 lb⋅ft (190 N⋅m) at 4000 rpm.

The fifth generation Nissan Serena uses a version of this engine with a 12.5:1 compression ratio, outputting 150 PS (110 kW; 148 hp) at 6000 rpm and 200 N⋅m (148 lb⋅ft) at 4400 rpm.

Applications:

- 2010–present Nissan Serena
- 2013–present Nissan X-Trail
- 2014–present Australian & New Zealand Markets Nissan Qashqai
- 2016–present Renault Koleos II
- 2017–present Renault Samsung QM6
- 2017–2022 Nissan Rogue Sport
- 2018–present Chinese Market Nissan Altima
- 2020–present Nissan Sentra
- 2024–present Nissan Kicks

== MR20DD Hybrid ==
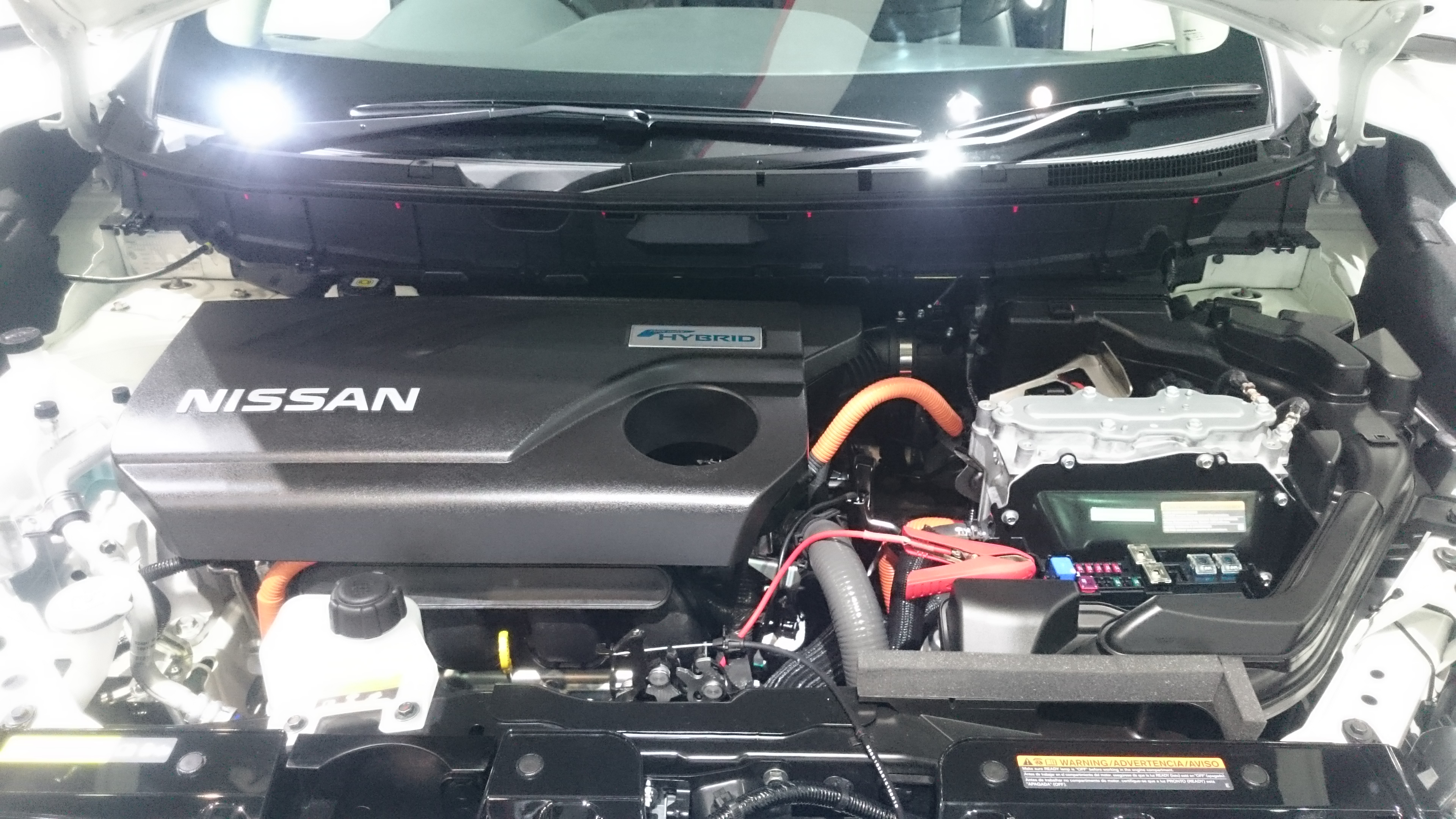
MR20DD Hybrid Engine

The MR20DD Hybrid is a 2.0 L (1997 cc) Hybrid engine developed by Nissan with direct injection and twin variable valve timing control. The MR20DD Hybrid engine is "SU-LEV" certified in Japan, and produces 144 PS (106 kW; 142 hp) at 6000 rpm and 147 lb⋅ft (199 N⋅m) of torque at 4400 rpm. with Synchronous Electric Motor produces 41 PS (30 kW; 40 hp) and 118 lb⋅ft (160 N⋅m) of torque and lithium-ion battery, for a combined power of 179 PS (132 kW; 177 hp).

Applications:

- 2013–present Nissan X-Trail Hybrid

== MR20DD S-Hybrid ==
The MR20DD S-Hybrid is a 2.0 L (1997 cc) Hybrid engine developed by Nissan with direct injection and twin variable valve timing control. The MR20DD S-Hybrid engine is MHEV "SU-LEV" certified in Japan, and produces 150 PS (110 kW; 148 hp) at 6000 rpm and 147 lb⋅ft (199 N⋅m) of torque at 4400 rpm. With synchronous electric motor and 48 V battery.

Applications:

- 2012–present Nissan Serena S-Hybrid

== M9 diesel ==
The M9R and M9T are a family of straight-four 16-valve turbocharged diesel engines co-developed by Nissan and Renault, and also Mercedes-Benz Group in the case of the M9T/OM699. Following Renault's designation plan, the last letter (M9R resp. M9T) is to indicate the swept volume of 2.0 L resp. 2.3 litres. Despite the similar names, the diesel engines are only loosely related to the MR gasoline engines. M9R is built at Renault's Cleon factory in Normandy. As of late 2018, a new version of the M9R using adBlue and with slightly different internal dimensions replaced the original M9R.

Features of the diesel engines include a cast-iron block, aluminium alloy cylinder head with double overhead camshafts, 16-valve layout and a bushes timing chain. The M9T is directed to heavier vehicles like the Nissan Navara or the Renault Master. It features a bore and stroke of 85 mm × 101.3 mm (3.35 in × 3.99 in) for a total displacement of 2,299 cc (2.3 L), balancer shafts, typical speeds are 3500 rpm for maximum power and 1250 rpm for maximum torque.

Low output versions of the M9R for the Renault Trafic II at 66 and 85 kW (90 and 116 PS; 89 and 114 hp) had been replaced by the Renault R engine with the introduction of the Trafic III, while versions starting from 96 kW (131 PS; 129 hp) include VNT chargers. The top version of the Navara utilizes the M9T with twin-turbochargers and 190 PS (140 kW; 187 hp). During production period engines had been updated up to Euro 6 (in early 2017).

=== M9R ===
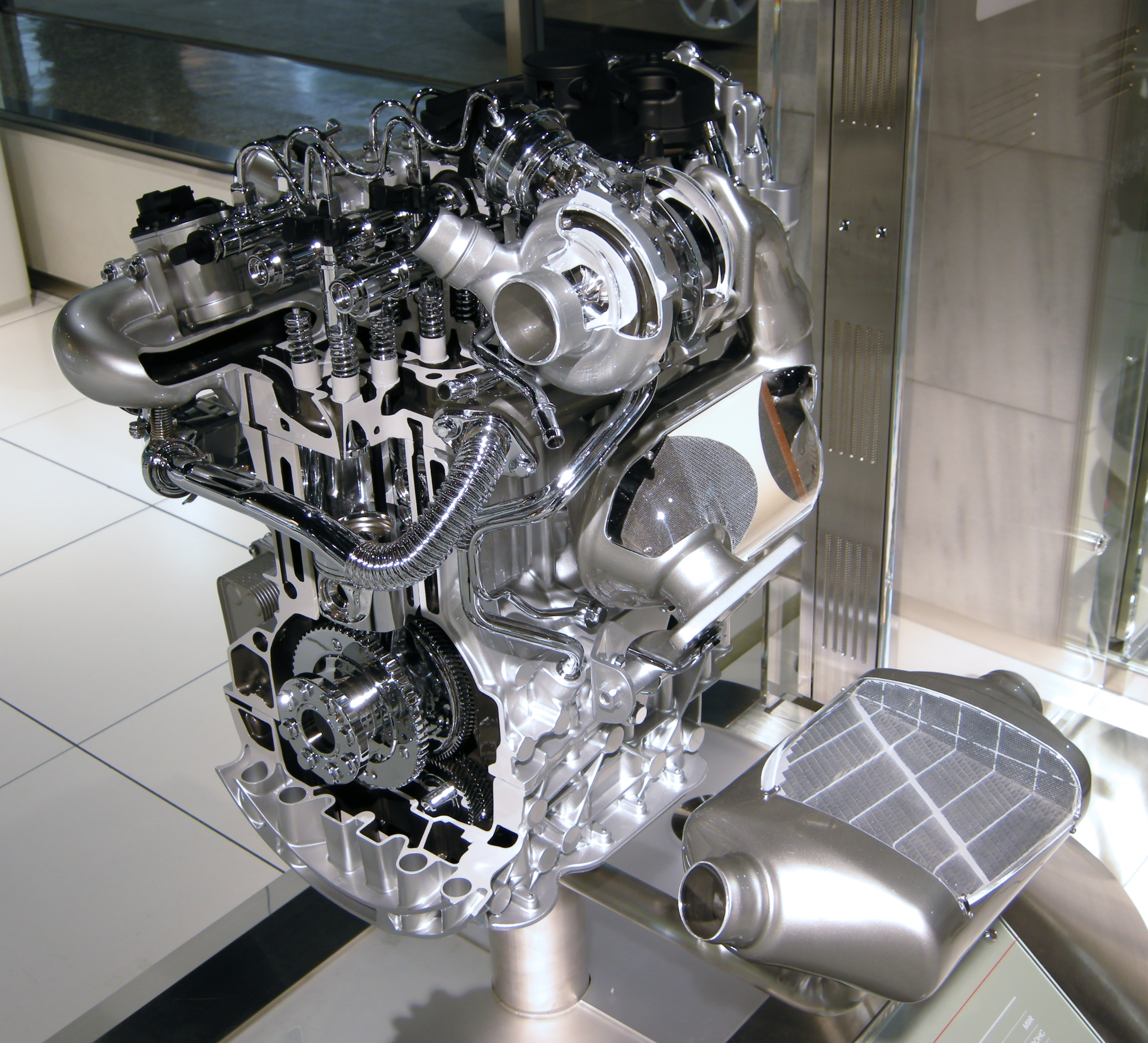
M9R turbo diesel engine

Renault-Nissan M9R
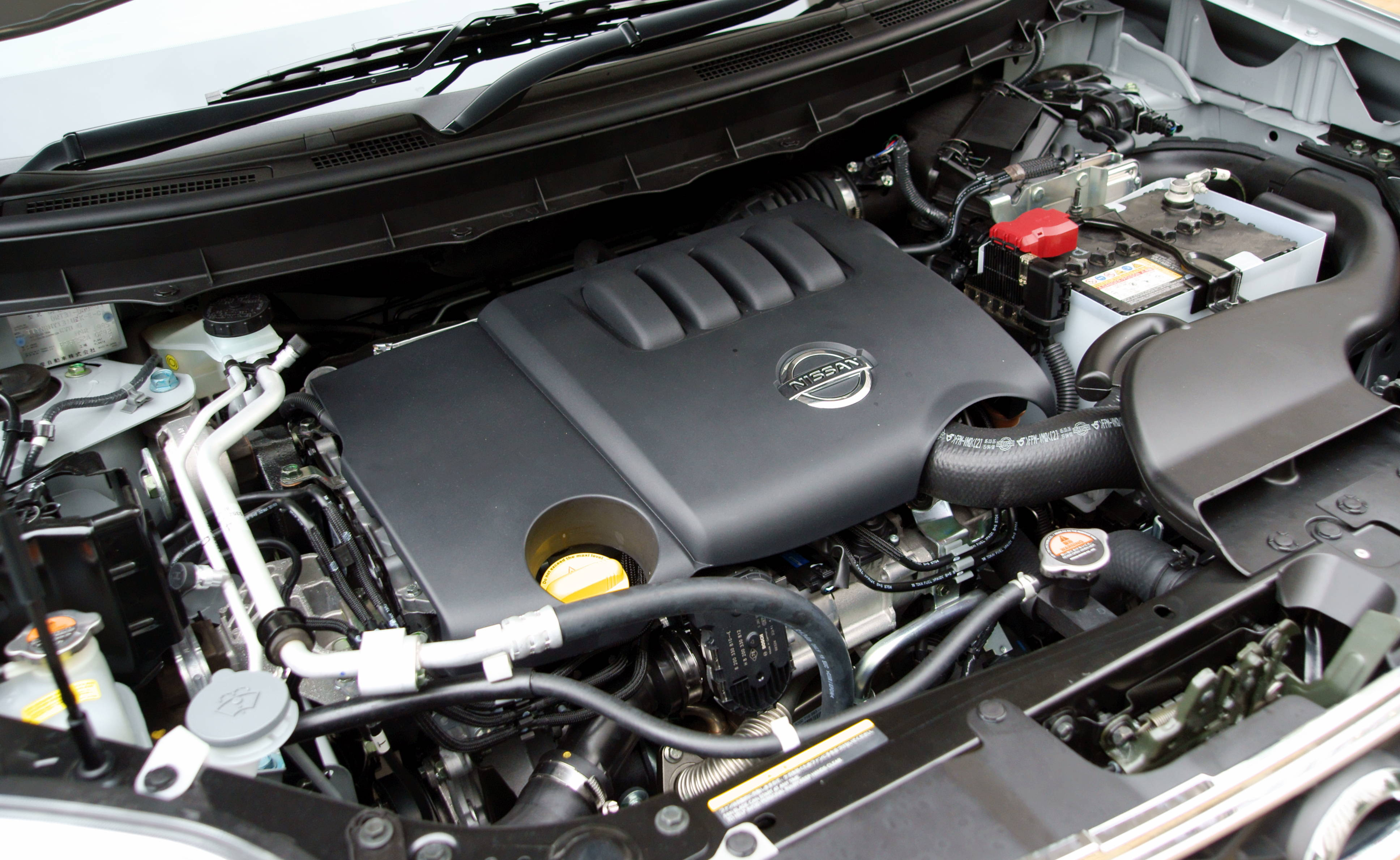

Overview
- Manufacturer: Nissan and Renault
- Also called: 2.0 dCi
- Production: 2006-present

Layout
- Configuration: Inline-four
- Displacement: 2.0 L (1995 cc); 2.0 L (1997 cc) (Gen 5)
- Cylinder bore: 84 mm (3.31 in); 85 mm (3.35 in) (Gen 5)
- Piston stroke: 88 mm (3.46 in) (Gen 5); 90 mm (3.54 in)
- Cylinder block material: Cast iron
- Cylinder head material: Aluminium alloy
- Valvetrain: DOHC 4 valves per cylinder
- Compression ratio: 15.6:1; 16.0:1

Combustion
- Turbocharger: Yes
- Fuel system: Common rail Direct Injection
- Fuel type: Diesel
- Cooling system: Water-cooled

Output
- Power output: 130–200 PS (96–147 kW; 130–200 hp)
- Torque output: 320–400 N⋅m (240–300 lb⋅ft)

Chronology
- Predecessor: Renault F-Type engine
- Successor: Renault R-Type engine

The M9R is a 2.0 L (1995 cc) 16-valve turbocharged diesel engine developed by the Renault–Nissan Alliance, and first installed in the Renault Laguna in 2006. It is available in the 150 PS (110 kW; 148 hp) tune in Nissan Qashqai, Nissan X-Trail, Renault Mégane, Renault Koleos and Renault Laguna models. In this trim the engine achieves maximum power at 4000 rpm and maximum torque of 340 N⋅m (251 lb⋅ft) at 2000 rpm. A 175 PS (129 kW; 173 hp) form with particulate filter is available in Renault Laguna and Nissan X-Trail models. A 180 PS (132 kW; 178 hp) variant is also available on the Laguna GT. In both engines maximum power is achieved at 3750 rpm and maximum torque is available from 1750 rpm.

In order to reduce vibrations, balance shafts are included in some versions of the engine. The 2.0 dCi engine in all its versions complies with the Euro 4 and 5 standards for exhaust emissions. The 150 PS (110 kW; 148 hp) New Mégane and New Laguna respectively emitted 144 g (5.1 oz)/km and 154 g (5.4 oz)/km of CO_{2} and the 129 kW (175 PS; 173 hp) version of New Laguna 2.0 dCi emits 159 g (5.6 oz)/km of CO_{2}; they all comply with the Euro 5 standards for exhaust emissions.

In 2011 the 96 and 110 kW (131 and 150 PS; 129 and 148 hp) M9R engines has been updated with an optional package to lower exhaust emissions (Euro5) and fuel consumption. These engines are tagged "2.0 Energy dCi 130" resp. "2.0 Energy dCi 150", typically maximum power is available at 3750 rpm and maximum torque at a minimum of 1750 rpm. The package comprises:

- Stop & Start
- Active thermal management
- Smart electrical management
- Variable capacity oil pump

The CO_{2} values were thus reduced to 118 g/km for the Laguna both the 2.0 Energy dCi 130 and 2.0 Energy dCi 150.

Towards the end of 2018, the 2-liter M9R engine became the "M9R Gen 5" when it received a thorough redesign to comply with the increasingly stringent anti-pollution regulations: first of all the engine dimensions were changed, from 84 mm × 90 mm (3.31 in × 3.54 in) to 85 mm × 88 mm (3.35 in × 3.46 in) - using the same bore as the larger M9T but with nearly no change in displacement, which increases by 2 cc to 1997 cc. Another important innovation introduced with this update was the BluedCi technology, which involves the installation of a small tank of adBlue, a chemical additive that is injected upstream of the catalyst and which, when combined with the exhaust gas, causes a reaction chemistry within the catalyst itself. This reaction transforms most of the nitrogen oxides into harmless nitrogen and water vapor. This engine debuted in two power levels, 160 and 200 PS (118 and 147 kW; 158 and 197 hp), in the Renault Talisman II 2.0 Blue dCi which was produced from December 2018. In December 2020 a single 190 PS version replaced both of the earlier versions.

The engine is fitted to the following vehicles:

- 2007–2011 Nissan Qashqai
- 2007–2012 Nissan X-Trail
- 2005–2015 Renault Laguna
- 2006–2015 Renault Mégane
- 2007–2016 Renault Koleos
- 2006–2014 Renault Espace
- 2007–2010 Renault Vel Satis
- 2011–2012 Renault Scénic
- 2015 Nissan Teana
- 2006–2014 Vauxhall Vivaro Renault Trafic Nissan Primastar
- 2010–2015 Renault Latitude
- 2015–2023 Renault Espace V

=== M9T ===
Renault M9T
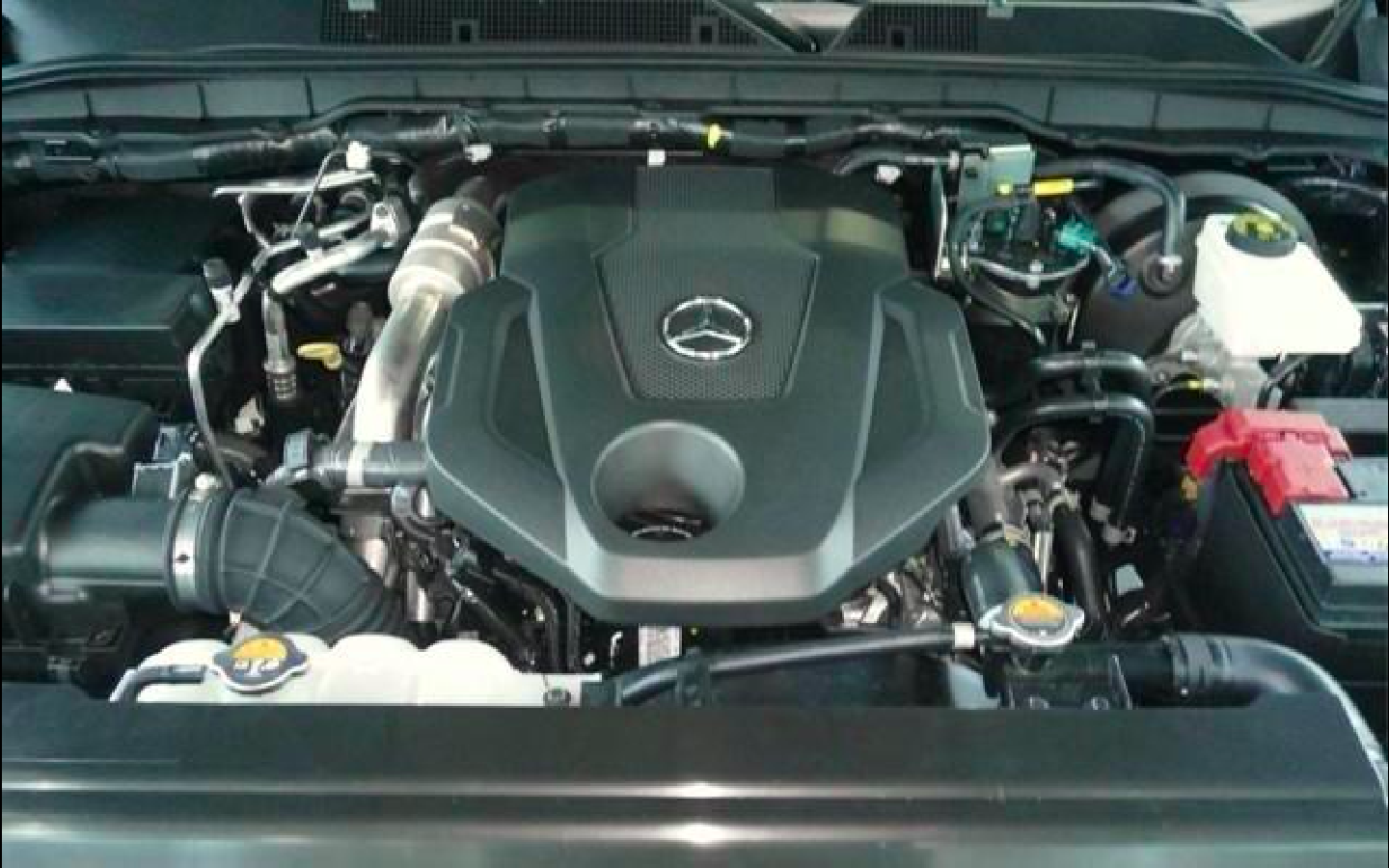

Overview
- Manufacturer: Mercedes-Benz Group & Renault–Nissan–Mitsubishi Alliance
- Also called: Nissan YS23; Mercedes-Benz OM699
- Production: 2010–present

Layout
- Configuration: Inline-four engine
- Displacement: 2.3 L (2,299 cc)
- Cylinder bore: 85 mm (3.35 in)
- Piston stroke: 101.3 mm (3.99 in)
- Cylinder block material: Aluminium alloy
- Cylinder head material: Aluminium alloy
- Valvetrain: DOHC
- Compression ratio: 15.4:1

Combustion
- Turbocharger: Single fixed geometry turbocharger; Single variable-geometry; Twin-turbo
- Fuel system: Common rail direct injection
- Fuel type: Diesel
- Cooling system: Water cooled

Output
- Power output: 75–140 kW (102–190 PS; 101–188 hp)
- Torque output: 285–450 N⋅m (210–332 lb⋅ft)

The M9T is a version specifically designed for light commercial vehicles that is manufactured by Renault in Cléon. It was introduced on the Renault Master and its badge engineered derivatives, initially with power ranging from 75 kW (101 hp) to 110 kW (150 hp), and torque ratings starting at 185 N⋅m (136 lbf⋅ft) up to 350 N⋅m (260 lbf⋅ft). Later, it was also introduced to the Nissan Navara and the Mercedes-Benz X-Class. Nissan calls it the YS23 while in Mercedes-Benz vehicles, it is named the OM699. The engines with lower power ratings feature a single fixed geometry turbocharger, while the more powerful versions have a variable-geometry turbocharger or twin-turbochargers. The engines are compliant with the Euro 6 emission regulations.

Applications:

- Dongfeng
  - Z9
- Mercedes-Benz
  - X-Class
- Nissan
  - Navara
  - NV400
  - Terra
- Opel
  - Movano
- Renault
  - Alaskan
  - Master
- Vauxhall
  - Movano
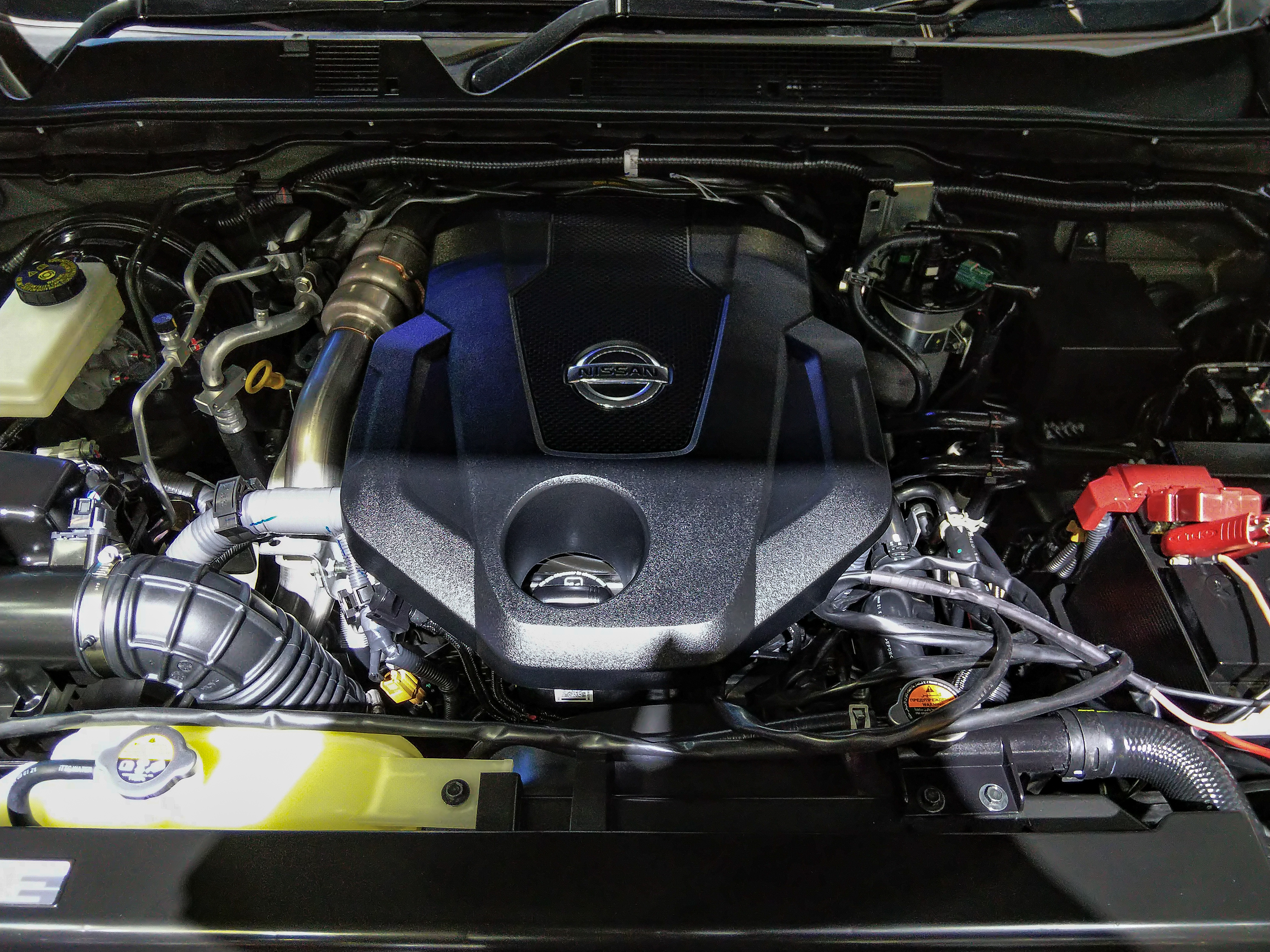
Nissan YS23DDTT Engine

== See also ==
- List of Nissan engines
- List of Renault engines
