= Renault R-Type engine =

R-Type engine
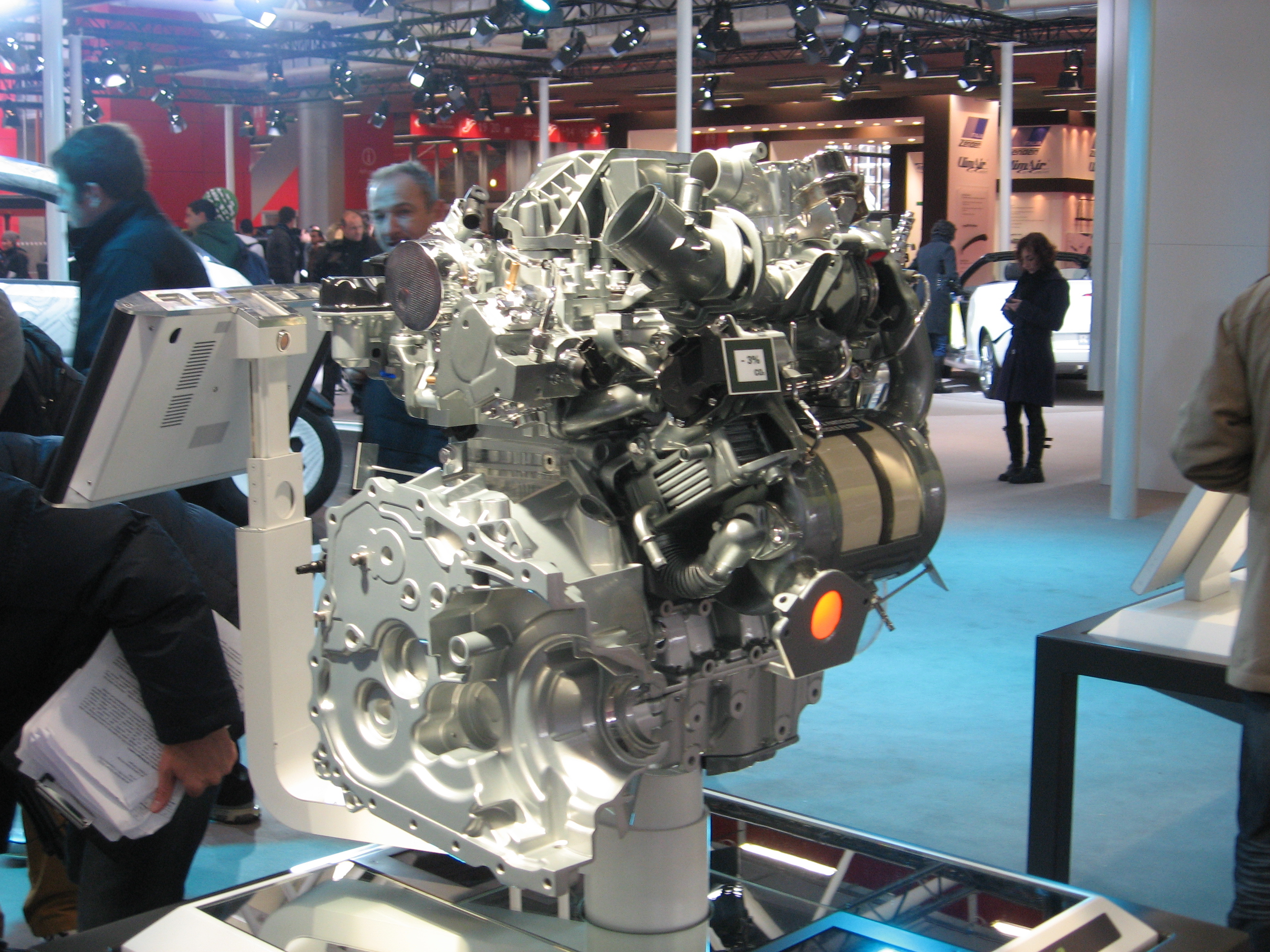

Overview
- Manufacturer: Mercedes-Benz & Renault–Nissan–Mitsubishi Alliance
- Also called: 1.6 dCi, 1.7 dCi, Mercedes-Benz OM626
- Production: 2011–present

Layout
- Configuration: I4
- Displacement: 1.6 L; 97.5 cu in (1,598 cc) (R9M); 1.7 L; 106.7 cu in (1,749 cc) (R9N)
- Cylinder bore: 80 mm (3.15 in)
- Piston stroke: 79.5 mm (3.13 in)
- Valvetrain: DOHC/4 valves x cyl. (R9M); SOHC/2 valves x cyl. (R9N)
- Compression ratio: 15.4:1

Combustion
- Turbocharger: Yes
- Fuel system: Common rail Direct Injection
- Fuel type: Diesel
- Cooling system: Water-cooled

Output
- Power output: 130–180 PS (96–132 kW; 128–178 hp)
- Torque output: 320–400 N⋅m (236–295 lb⋅ft)

Chronology
- Predecessor: 1.9 dCi, 2.0 dCi
- Successor: Mercedes-Benz OM 622/OM 626 (Mercedes-Benz)

The R-Type is a family of straight-4 turbocharged diesel engines developed by both Nissan and Renault, and also Daimler in regarding the R9M/OM626 engine. Released in 2011, it replaced the 1.9 dCi engine in Renault's range and the 2.0 dCi in the Nissan Qashqai, and in 2015, it also replaced the 2.0 dCi in the Renault Mégane as well. When launched, the engine produced 130 PS (96 kW; 128 hp). Renault later introduced a higher-powered twin-turbocharged variant producing 160 PS (118 kW; 158 hp).

== Summary ==
Engine code	Displacement	Power	rpm	Torque	rpm
R9M	1.6 L; 97.5 cu in (1,598 cc)	130 PS (96 kW; 128 hp)	4000	320 N⋅m (236 lb⋅ft)	1750
R9M	1.6 L; 97.5 cu in (1,598 cc)	136 PS (100 kW; 134 hp)	4000	330 N⋅m (243 lb⋅ft)	1750
R9M	1.6 L; 97.5 cu in (1,598 cc)	160 PS (118 kW; 158 hp)	4000	380 N⋅m (280 lb⋅ft)	1750
R9M	1.6 L; 97.5 cu in (1,598 cc)	180 PS (132 kW; 178 hp)	4000	400 N⋅m (295 lb⋅ft)	1750
R9N	1.7 L; 106.7 cu in (1,749 cc)	120 PS (88 kW; 118 hp)	3500 / 4000	300 N⋅m (221 lb⋅ft)	1750
R9N	1.7 L; 106.7 cu in (1,749 cc)	150 PS (110 kW; 148 hp)	3500 / 4000	340 N⋅m (251 lb⋅ft)	1750

== R9M 130 ==
R9M 130PS was introduced in 2011.

Developed within the framework of the Alliance, the newcomer's performance credentials were made similar to those of its predecessor, the 1.9 dCi 130 engine. This 1.6-litre power plant delivered peak power of 130 PS (96 kW; 128 hp) and torque of 320 N⋅m (236 lb⋅ft) available across a broad rev-band.

This new block came with a change in Renault's engine downsizing policy. More downsizing was to be obtained, thanks to the shortening of the stroke of the pistons and a redesign of the reciprocating parts. The cylinder's swept volume was reduced and thereby diminished the amount of fuel being burned during each cycle. Performance levels were maintained, however, by improving turbocharging efficiency.

Applications:

- 2011 - Renault Scénic
- 2011 - Nissan Qashqai
- 2012 - Renault Mégane
- 2013 - Renault Fluence
- 2014 - Mercedes Vito
- 2014 - Mercedes C Class
- 2015 - Renault Kadjar
- 2016 - Renault Talisman

== R9M 160 ==
R9M 160 was launched in February 2011. It is twin-turbocharged, derived from the new Energy dCi 130. It produces 160 PS (118 kW; 158 hp) from a capacity of 1.6 L (1,598 cc) – a specific power output of 100.1 PS (73.6 kW; 98.7 hp) per liter. Peak torque 380 N⋅m (280 lb⋅ft) is available from 1,750 rpm. Paired with a dual clutch EDC gearbox, this driveline outputs CO_{2} emissions of 99 g (3.5 oz) per kilometre.

Applications:

- 2011 - Renault Captur Concept Car
- 2015 - Renault Espace
- 2016 - Renault Scenic
- 2015 - Renault Talisman

== R9N 120 ==
R9N 120 was launched in 2018

Developed within the framework of the Alliance, the newcomer's performance credentials are similar to those of its predecessor, the 1.9 dCi 130 engine. This 1.7 litre powerplant delivers peak power of 120 PS (88 kW; 118 hp) and torque of 300 N⋅m (221 lb⋅ft) available across a broad rev-band.

Applications:

- 2018 - Renault Scénic
- 2018 - Renault Talisman

== R9N 150 ==
R9N 150 was launched in 2019

This 1.75 litres (1,750 cc) (commonly referred to as a 1.7 litre engine) 4-cylinder 16-valve Diesel engine delivers peak power of 150 PS (110 kW; 148 hp) and torque of 340 N⋅m (251 lb⋅ft) available across a broad rev-band. This engine was discontinued in 2021 alongside all other diesel engines in the cars of the Renault-Nissan alliance as part of their plan to stop developing and selling new diesel engines in their cars by 2021 in favor of hybrids and EVs.

Applications:

- 2018–2021 Renault Mégane
- 2018–2021 Renault Kadjar
- 2018–2021 Renault Talisman
- 2019–2021 Nissan Qashqai
- 2019–2021 Nissan X-Trail (Europe)

== See also ==
- Renault K-Type engine
- List of Renault engines
