= Jinbei Konect =

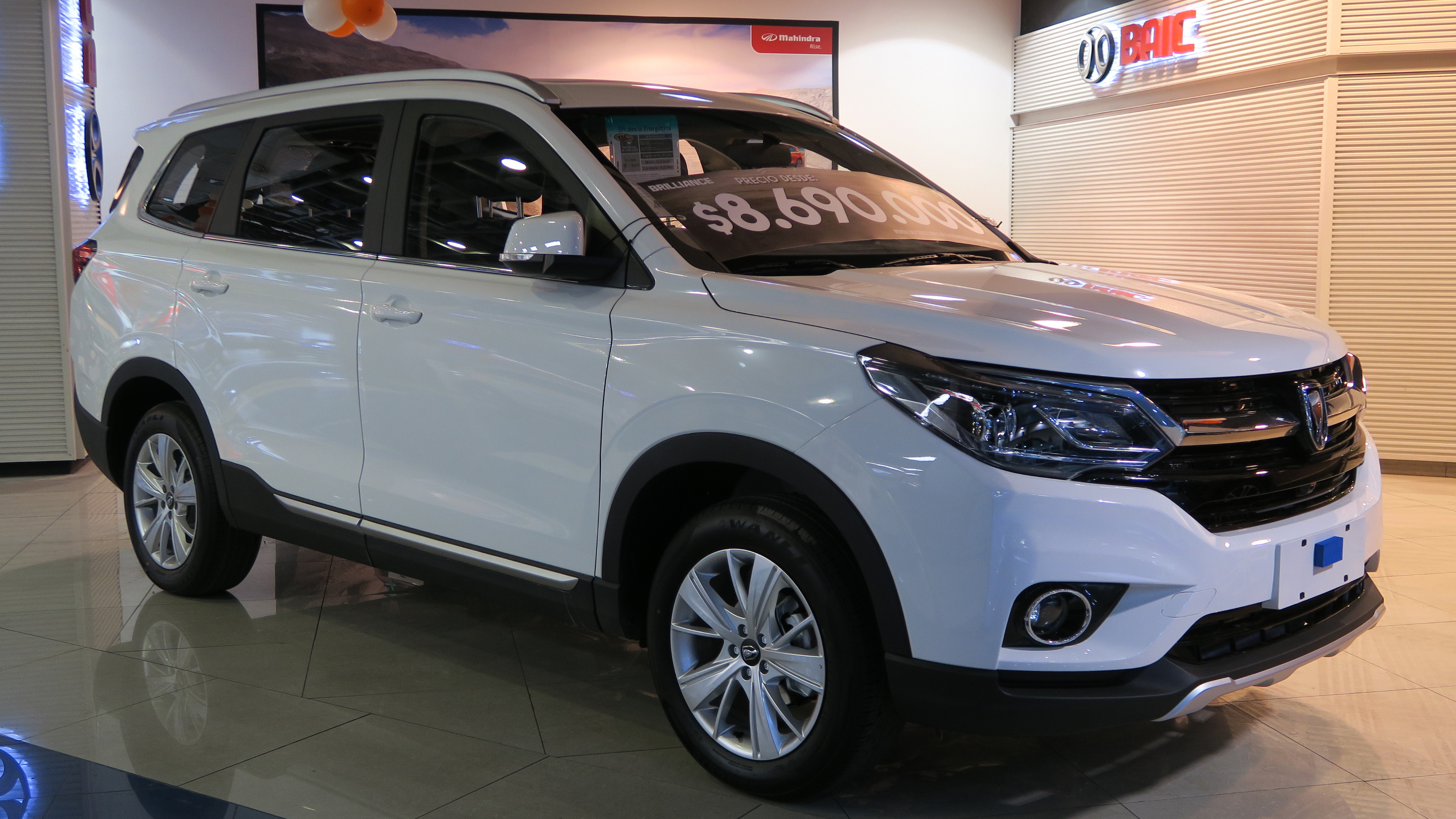
- Brilliance Konect in Chile

Overview
- Production: 2018–2021
- Model years: 2018–2021

Body and chassis
- Layout: Front engine Front-wheel drive
- Related: Renault Kadjar

Powertrain
- Engine: 1.5L turbo I4; 1.6L BM16LD I4
- Transmission: 5-speed manual

Dimensions
- Wheelbase: 2,780 mm (109 in)
- Length: 4,745 mm (187 in)
- Width: 1,820 mm (72 in)
- Height: 1,780 mm (70 in)
- Curb weight: 1,485-1,595 kg

The Jinbei Konect or Jinbei Guanjing (观境) is a mid-size three-row crossover produced by Renault Brilliance Jinbei joint venture under the Jinbei brand.

== Overview ==
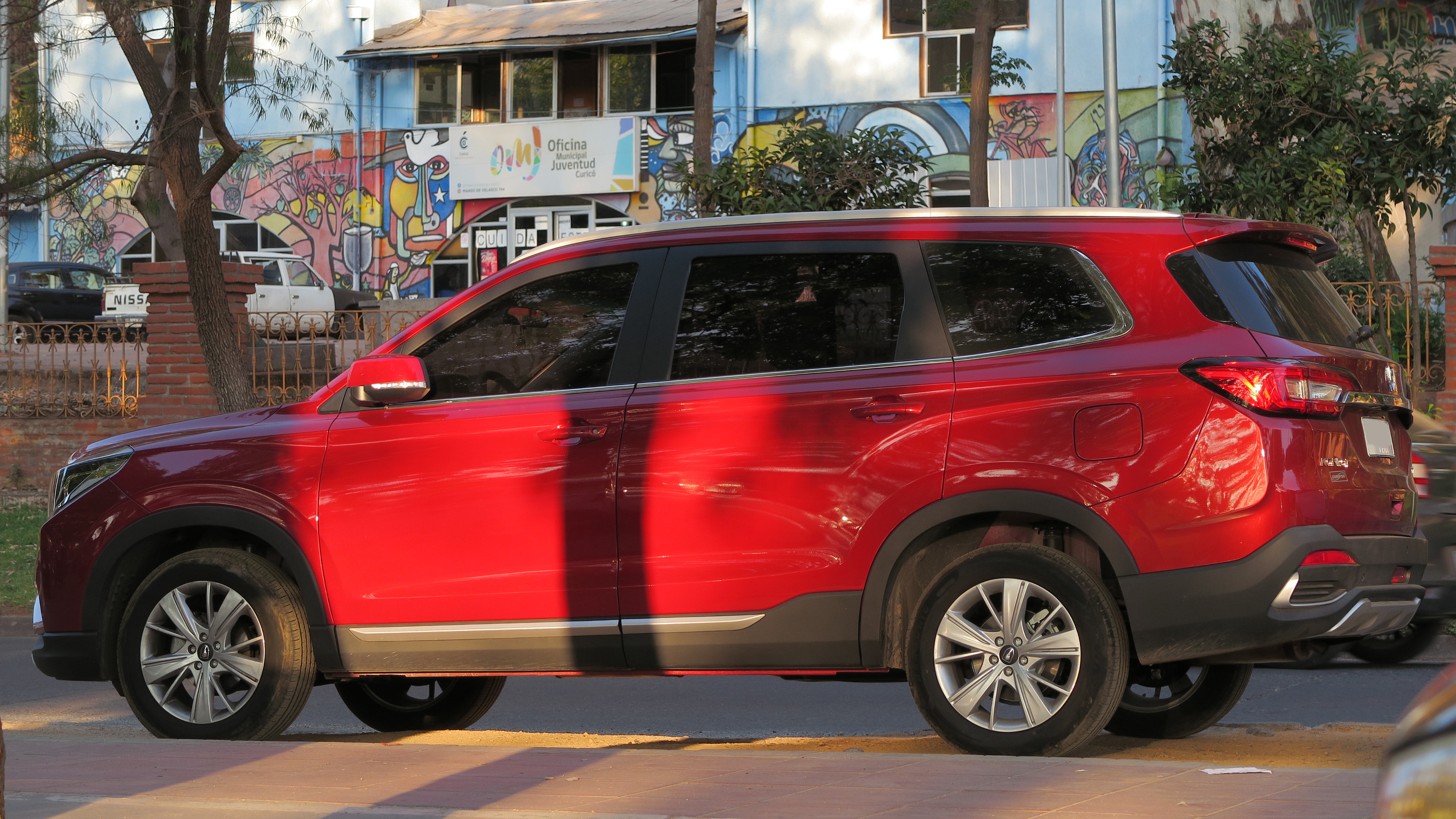
Jinbei Konect rear

The Jinbei Konect or Guanjing was unveiled on the 2018 Beijing Auto Show in China.

Engine options of the Jinbei Konect includes a 1.5 liter turbo inline 4 engine producing 150hp, and a 1.6 liter inline 4 engine producing 118hp.

Prices of the Jinbei Guanjing in China ranges from 75,900 to 102,900 yuan as of 2020.
