= Renault Talisman =

Large family car manufactured by Renault

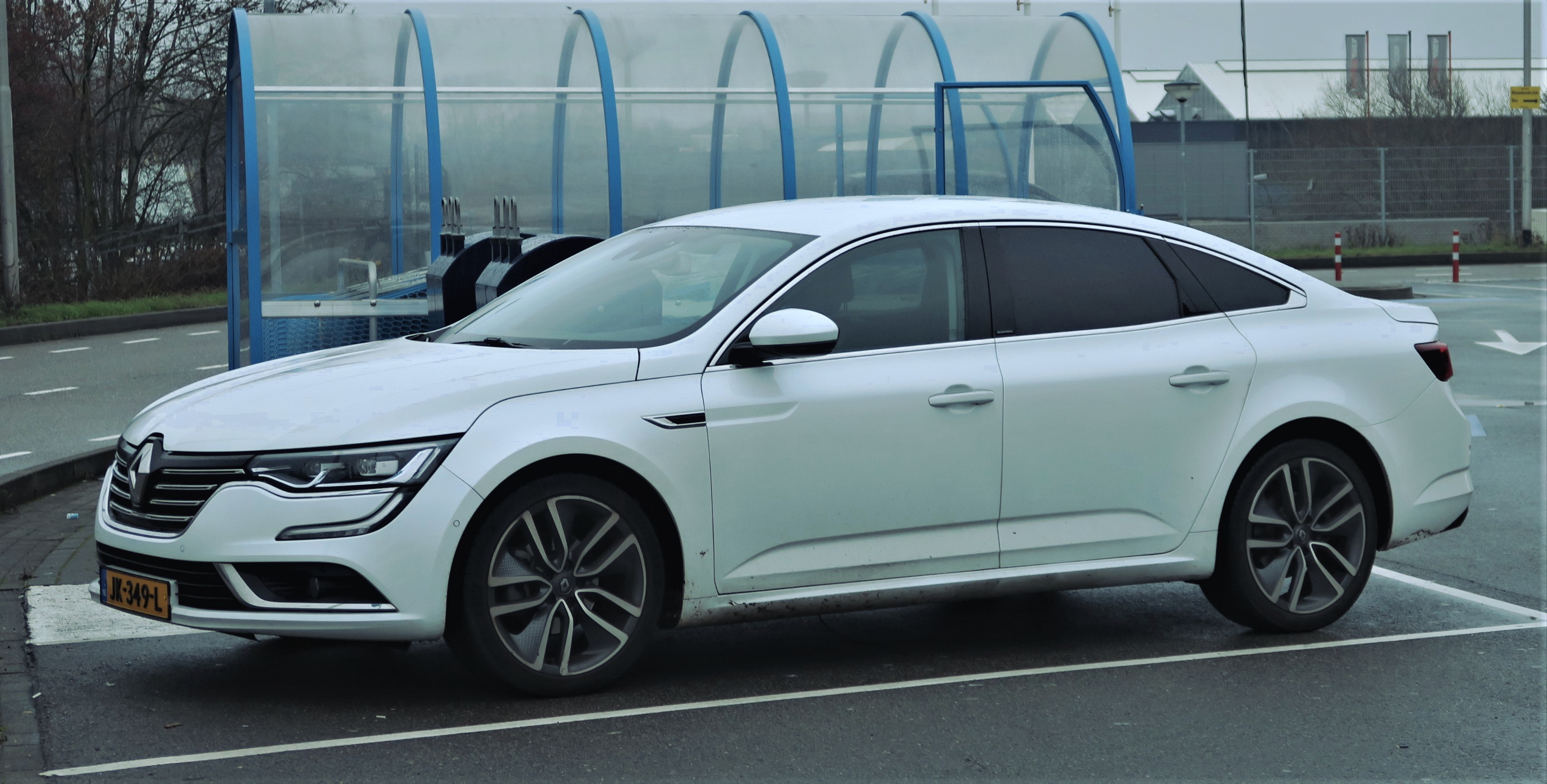

Overview
- Manufacturer: Renault
- Model code: LFD; KFD (Grandtour)
- Also called: Renault Samsung SM6 (South Korea; 2016–2022); Renault SM6 (South Korea; 2022–2025)
- Production: 2015–2022 (France); 2016–2025 (South Korea)
- Assembly: France: Douai (Douai Renault Factory); South Korea: Busan (Renault Korea Motors)
- Designer: Alexis Martot; Under the lead of Laurens van den Acker

Body and chassis
- Class: Mid-size car / large family car (D-segment)
- Body style: 4-door saloon 5-door estate
- Layout: Front-engine, front-wheel-drive
- Platform: Renault–Nissan CMF-CD platform
- Related: Renault Espace V

Powertrain
- Engine: Petrol: 1.3 L H5Ht 16v turbo I4; 1.6 L M5Mt 16v turbo I4; 1.8 L M5Pt 16v turbo I4; 2.0 L M5R 16v I4; LPG: 2.0 L LPe I4; Diesel: 1.5 L K9K 8v I4; 1.6 L R9M 16v I4; 1.7 L R9N 8v I4; 2.0 L M9R 16v I4
- Transmission: 6-speed manual; 6-speed 6DCT450/451 automatic Getrag; 7-speed 7DCT300 automatic Getrag; XTronic CVT

Dimensions
- Wheelbase: 2,810 mm (110.6 in)
- Length: 4,850 mm (190.9 in)
- Width: 1,870 mm (73.6 in)
- Height: 1,460 mm (57.5 in)
- Curb weight: 1,413–1,595 kg (3,115–3,516 lb)

Chronology
- Predecessor: Renault Laguna; Renault Latitude (Europe)
- Successor: Renault Rafale (Europe); Renault Filante (South Korea, SM6)

The Renault Talisman is a large family car manufactured by the French car manufacturer Renault from 2015 to 2025. It replaced the Renault Laguna, as well as the larger Renault Latitude, for which no direct replacement was scheduled. It was produced by Renault's Douai Renault Factory from 2015 to 2022 and its South Korean subsidiary Renault Korea from 2016 to 2025, where it was marketed as the Renault Samsung SM6.

Renault ended production of the Talisman in Europe in February 2022. In April 2024, Renault Korea announced that the SM6 will be discontinued in South Korea as it adopted the global diamond logo on their other models.

== Overview ==
The saloon version of the Talisman was first unveiled on 6 July 2015, at the Château de Chantilly by Renault's CEO Carlos Ghosn, with an estate version scheduled to be revealed at the 2015 Frankfurt Motor Show two months later. The two versions were allegedly codenamed LFD (saloon) and KFD (estate).

The car is based on the CMF-CD platform, jointly developed by Renault and Nissan, and is the second Renault car to use it following the Espace. The use of the new platform is aimed at giving the Talisman a production volume advantage, that its predecessor (the Laguna) never achieved. Renault executives stated that, like the new crossover, the Espace, it will not be engineered for right-hand drive markets, due to the decline in the traditional saloon market.

The use of the Talisman name is intended as a way of unifying Renault nomenclature across the world, as Renault already sells in China a similar car named Talisman. Renault said the name "conjures up notions of both protection and power. At the same time, Talisman is an easy word to pronounce and understand the world over."

=== Design and technical details ===
The Talisman is slightly larger than the Laguna, with a lower centre of gravity. Renault focused on design, equipment and comfort with the aim of regaining market share in the large family car segment. Daimler personnel visited the car manufacturing site at Douai, and gave input on quality control and perceived quality.

According to Renault staff, they wanted to give the car the "fluid and emotional" aspect of smaller models from the company. They also tried to achieve a more "classic" styling than they used for its predecessor with the aim of gaining market share from the business fleets.

The Talisman is the first large Renault car since the Renault 18 in the 1980s for which no hatchback body is available either as standard or as an option. The car had originally five trim levels for Europe (Life, Zen, Business, Intens, and Initiale Paris).

Euro NCAP test results Renault Talisman (2015)
Test	Points	%
Overall:	5 /5 stars	
Adult occupant:	32.9	86%
Child occupant:	41.4	84%
Pedestrian:	24.7	68%
Safety assist:	10	76%

In March 2018, Renault unveiled a sportier trim level powered by a 1.8-litre petrol engine called the S Edition, aimed to be introduced in the market by September 2018. This model shares the same engine with the Mégane RS and the Alpine A110, but it is detuned for the Talisman. In South Korea, the car was launched with up to four trim levels (PE, SE, LE and RE), although their number varied according to the engine used.

In March 2018, Renault Samsung introduced a minor facelift for the South Korean market, with some exterior changes, interior equipment updates and new colours. In July 2019, Renault Samsung launched a new high end trim, called Premiere.

The car has a four wheel steering system (called 4Control) which is not available in the South Korean version. It also incorporates a system (Multi-Sense) which allows adjusting all car settings between four pre-set options called Comfort, Sport, Eco and Neutral, and a user configurable option called Perso.

As an option, the Talisman has a new infotainment system with an 8.7 in (220 mm) touchscreen introduced in the fifth generation Espace, called R-Link 2 (S-Link in South Korea). The equipment also include adaptive cruise control, lane departure warning, traffic sign detection with excess speed warning and blind spot alert.

The car scored a five star rating at the tests for Euro NCAP in 2015. Gearboxes are six/seven speed dual-clutch automatic, six speed manual and CVT (the latter only available in a liquefied petroleum gas version sold in South Korea). Suspension is made of Pseudo MacPherson struts on front and a semi rigid axle on rear, with an optional active suspension system. Brakes are discs on both axles.

The Talisman received a facelift in February 2020, including new LED Matrix headlamps with adaptive lighting, 10.2 in (260 mm) digital instrument cluster, 9.3 in (240 mm) 'Easy Link' portrait style touchscreen infotainment system, and a range of advanced driver assistance systems (ADAS).

== Engines ==
The Talisman is powered by a range of petrol and diesel engines in both Europe and South Korea. The diesel engined versions were not initially sold in South Korea, while there is a liquefied petroleum gas version only for the market in South Korea. In August 2016, a diesel version was introduced for the market in South Korea.

In November 2018, Renault announced the introduction of both petrol and diesel WLTP compliant engines.

Engine	Type	C.	Displacement	Power	Torque
Petrol engines
TCe 160 EDC FAP ^{†}	Turbo direct injection	4	1,330 cc	120 kW (163 hp) at 5,500 rpm	270 N⋅m (199 lb⋅ft) at 1,800 rpm
Energy TCe 150 EDC7 ^{a}	Turbo direct injection	4	1,618 cc	110 kW (150 hp) at 5,200 rpm	220 N⋅m (162 lb⋅ft) at 1,750 rpm
Energy TCe 200 EDC7	Turbo direct injection	4	1,618 cc	147 kW (200 hp) at 6,000 rpm ^{a}; 140 kW (190 hp) at 5,750 rpm ^{b}	260 N⋅m (192 lb⋅ft) at 2,500 rpm
Energy TCe 225 EDC7; TCe 225 EDC FAP ^{†}	Turbo direct injection	4	1,798 cc	165 kW (224 hp) at 5,600 rpm (Energy TCe 225 EDC7); at 5,500 rpm (TCe 225 EDC FAP)	300 N⋅m (221 lb⋅ft) at 1,750 rpm (Energy TCe 225 EDC7); at 2,000 rpm (TCe 225 EDC FAP)
2.0 GDe ^{b}	Direct injection	4	1,997 cc	110 kW (150 hp) at 5,800 rpm	202 N⋅m (149 lb⋅ft) at 4,400 rpm
Diesel engines
Energy dCi 110 ECO2	Turbo common rail injection	4	1,461 cc	81 kW (110 hp) at 4,000 rpm	260 N⋅m (192 lb⋅ft) at 1,750 rpm
Energy dCi 130; Energy dCi 130 EDC6^{a}	Variable-geometry turbo common rail injection	4	1,598 cc	96 kW (131 hp) at 4,000 rpm	320 N⋅m (236 lb⋅ft) at 1,750 rpm
Energy dCi 160 EDC6^{a}	Twin-turbo common rail injection	4	1,598 cc	118 kW (160 hp) at 4,000 rpm	380 N⋅m (280 lb⋅ft) at 1,750 rpm
Blue dCi 120 ^{†}; Blue dCi 150 ^{†}	Turbocharged with electrical actuator for variable nozzle turbine, direct injection	4	1,749 cc	88 kW (120 hp) at 3,500 rpm (Blue dCi 120); 110 kW (150 hp) at 3,500 rpm (Blue dCi 150)	300 N⋅m (221 lb⋅ft) at 1,750 rpm (Blue dCi 120); 340 N⋅m (251 lb⋅ft) at 1,750 rpm (Blue dCi 150)
Blue dCi 160 EDC ^{†}; Blue dCi 200 EDC ^{†}	Turbocharged with electrical actuator for variable nozzle turbine, common rail injection	4	1,997 cc	118 kW (160 hp) at 3,750 rpm (Blue dCi 160 EDC); 147 kW (200 hp) at 3,500 rpm (Blue dCi 200 EDC)	360 N⋅m (266 lb⋅ft) at 1,500 rpm (Blue dCi 160 EDC); 400 N⋅m (295 lb⋅ft) at 1,750 rpm (Blue dCi 200 EDC)
Liquefied petroleum gas engines
2.0 LPe^{b}	Liquid injection	4	1,998 cc	103 kW (140 hp) at 6,000 rpm	193 N⋅m (142 lb⋅ft) at 3,700 rpm
Notes
^{†} WLTP-compliant engines introduced in November 2018.; ^{a} Only used in the European version.; ^{b} Only used in the South Korean version.

== Gallery ==
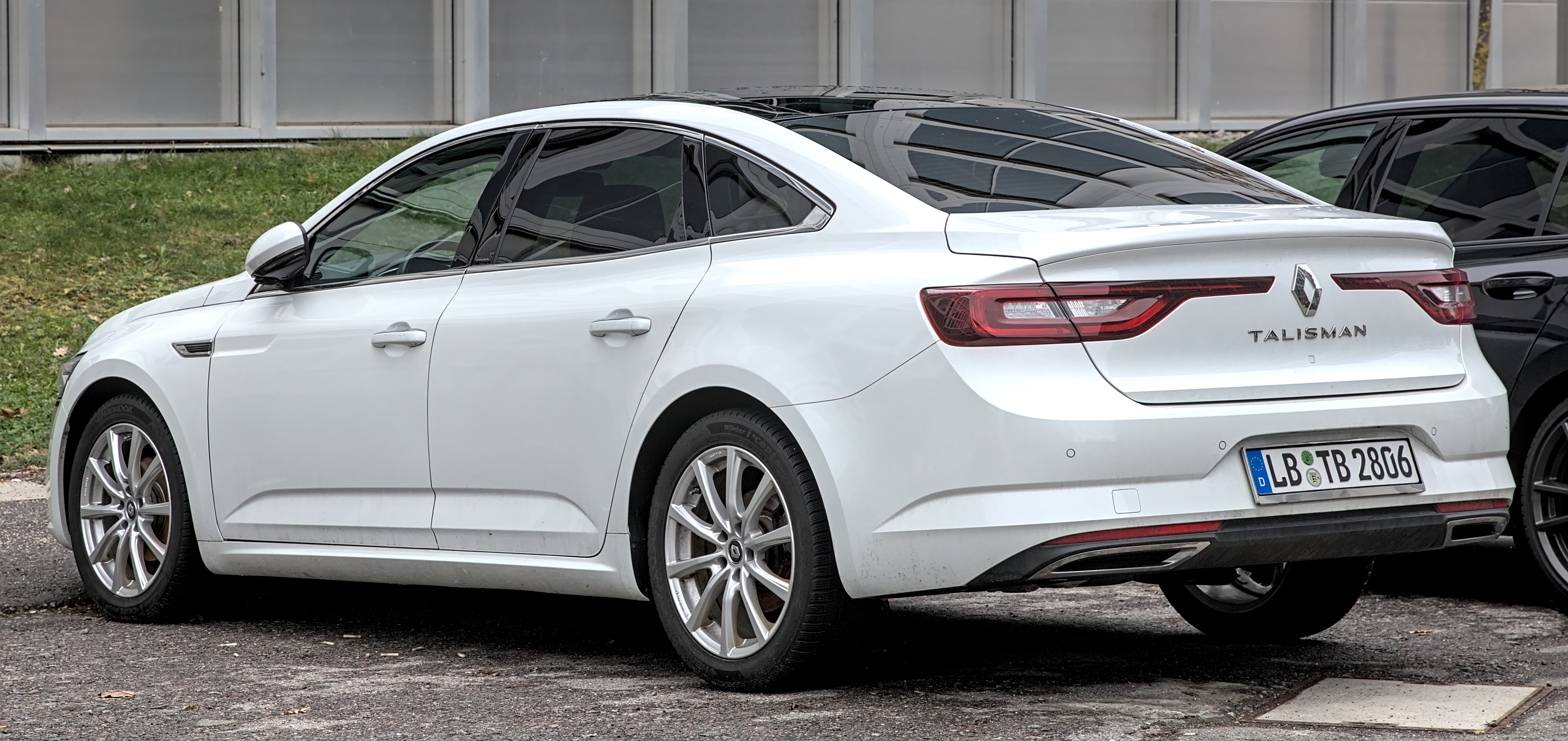
Renault Talisman (pre-facelift)

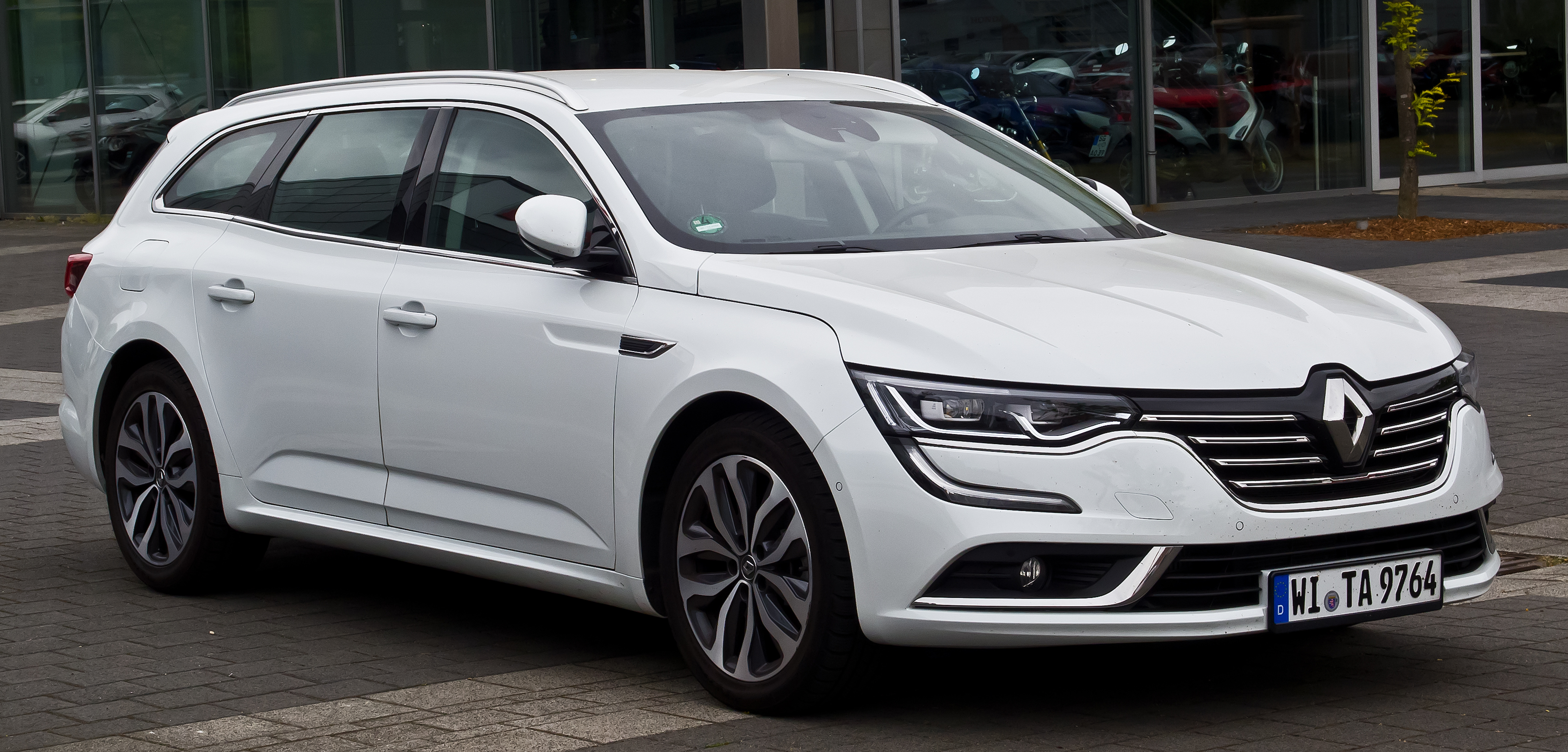
Renault Talisman Grandtour (pre-facelift)

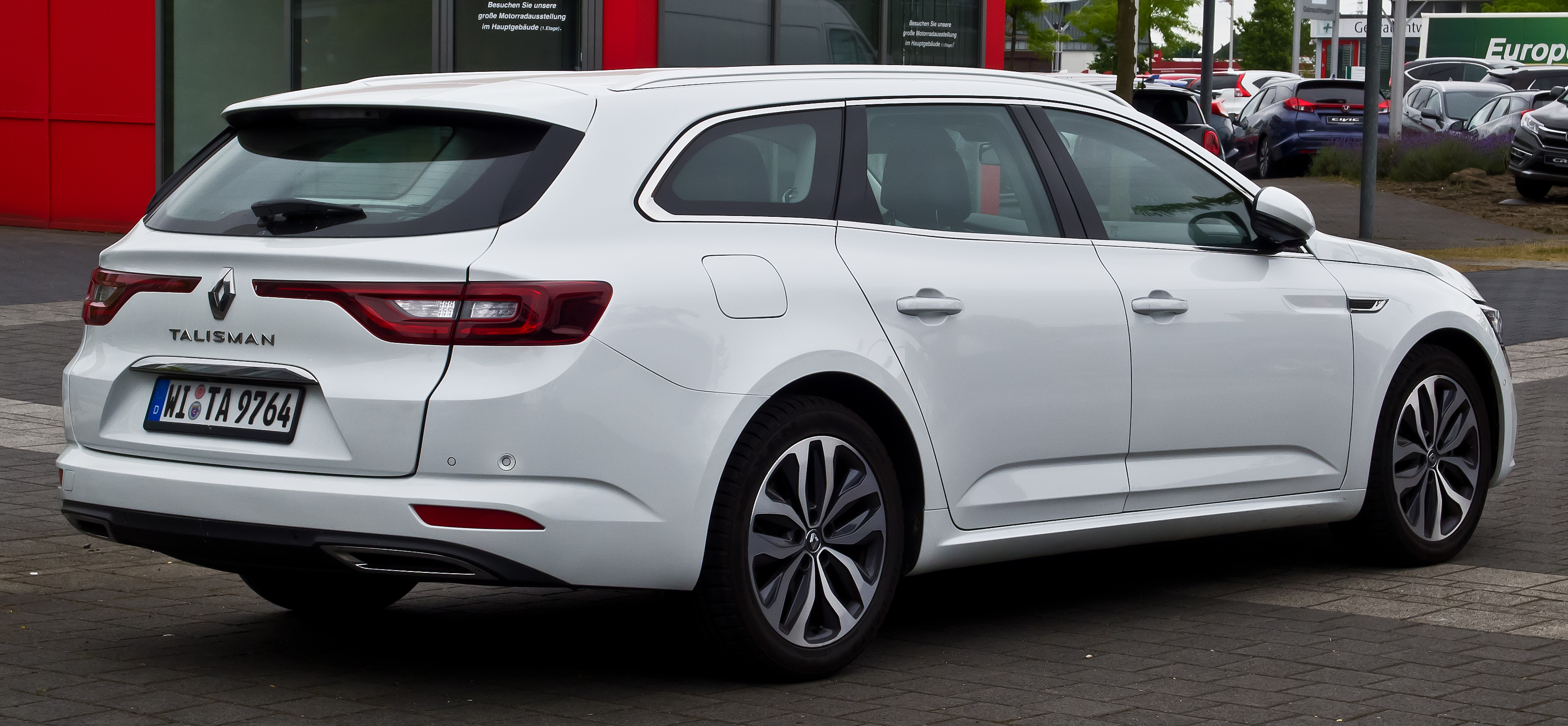
Renault Talisman Grandtour (pre-facelift)

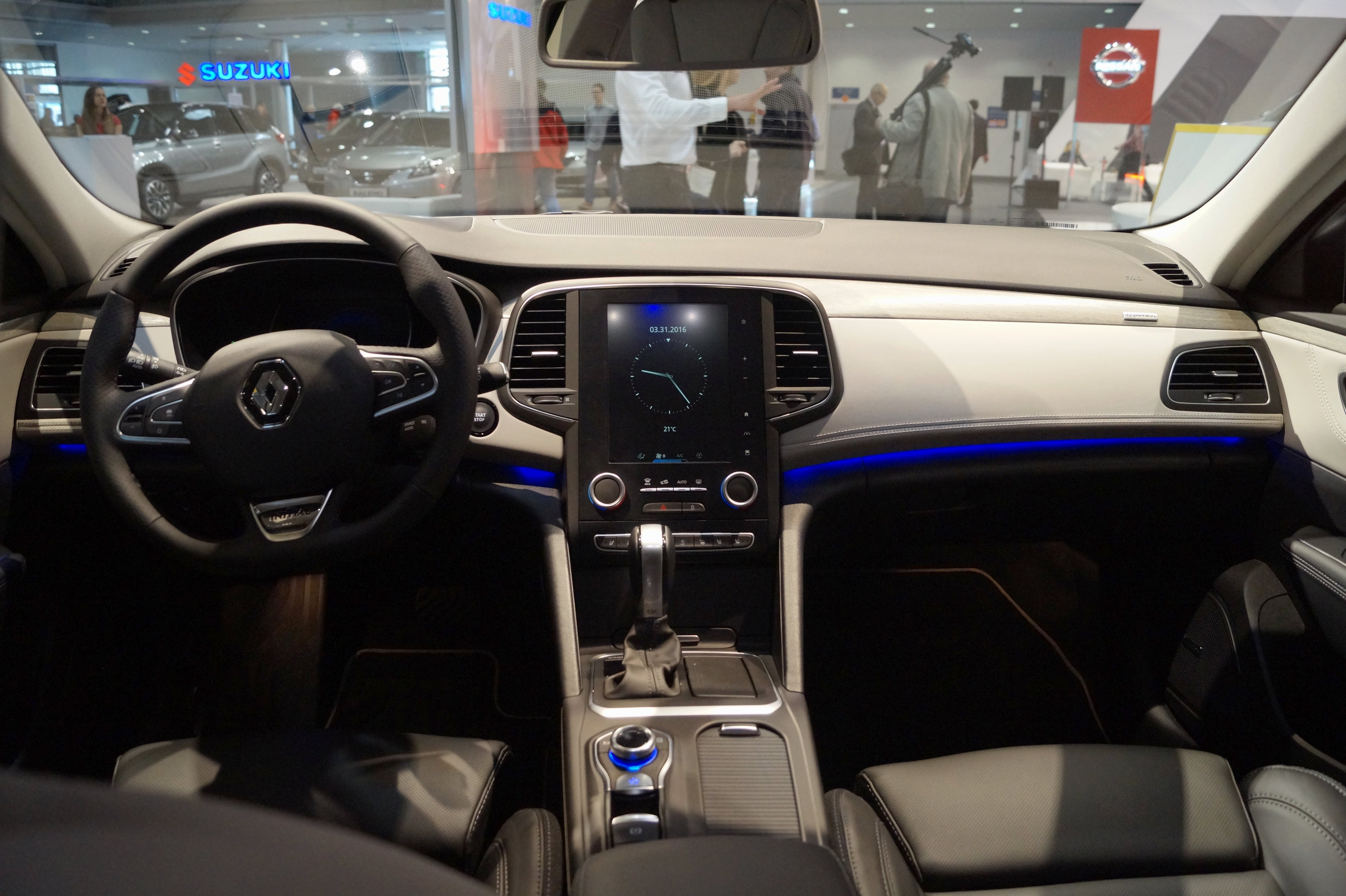
Renault Talisman interior (pre-facelift)

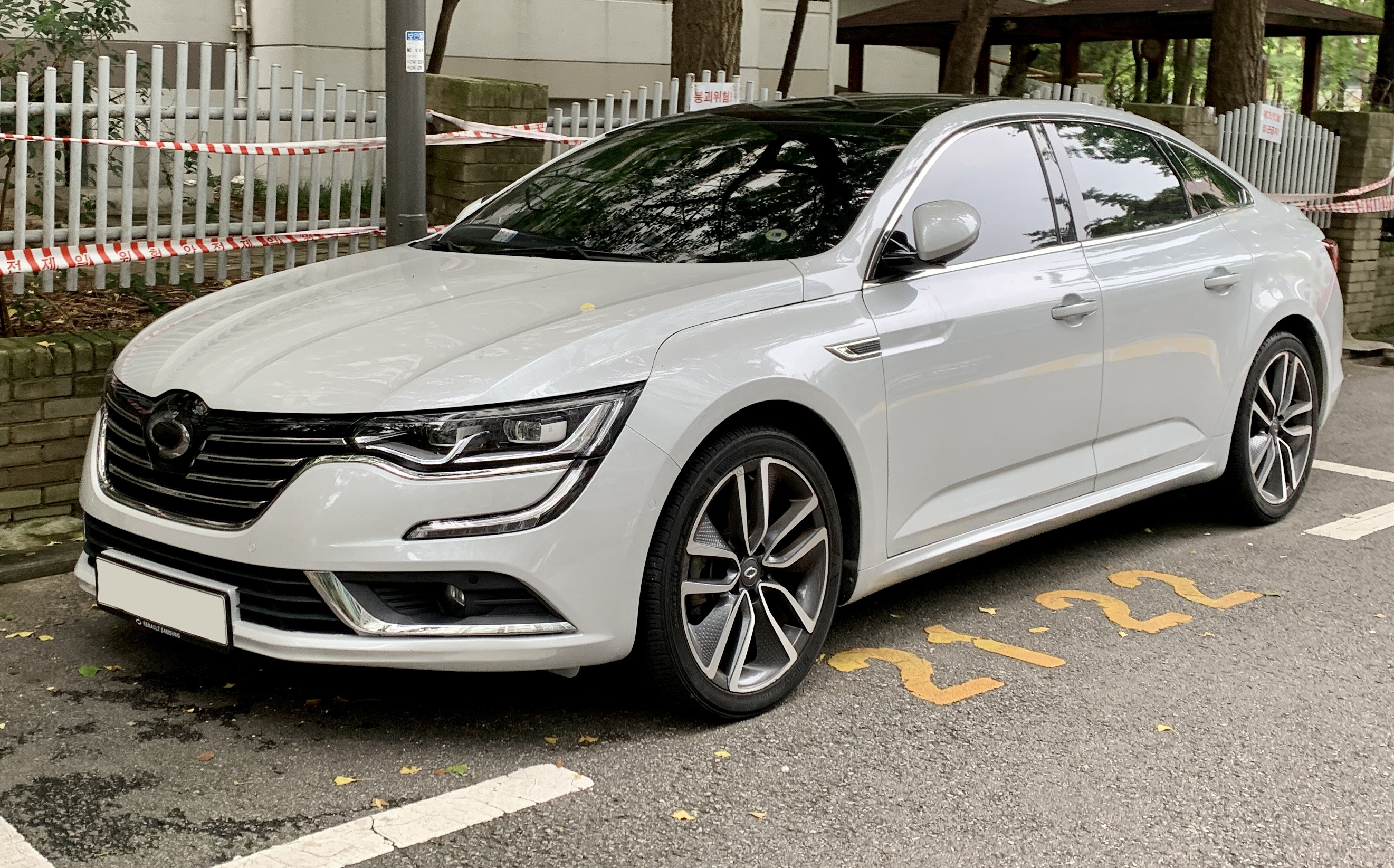
Renault Samsung SM6 (pre-facelift)

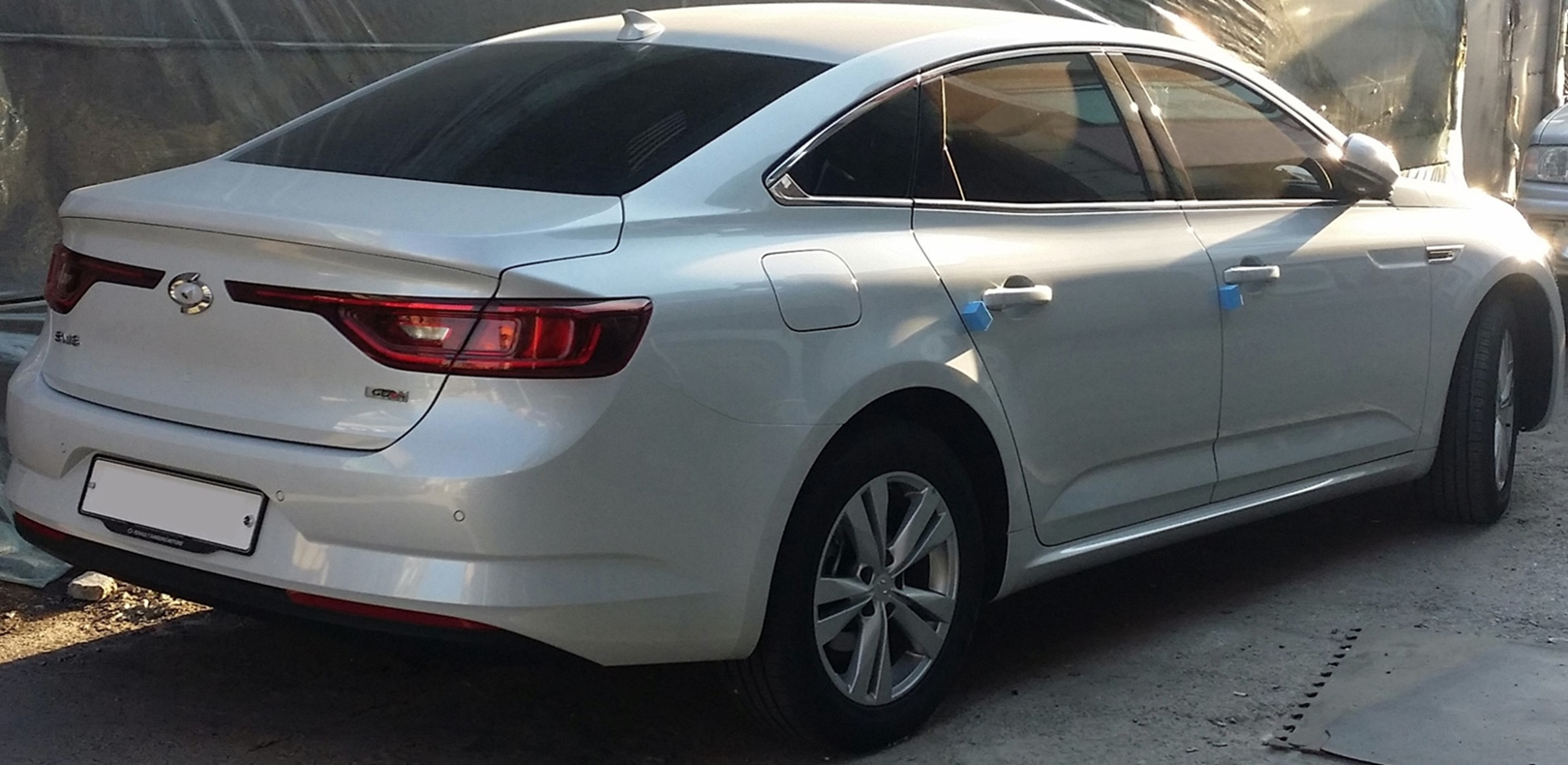
Renault Samsung SM6 (pre-facelift)

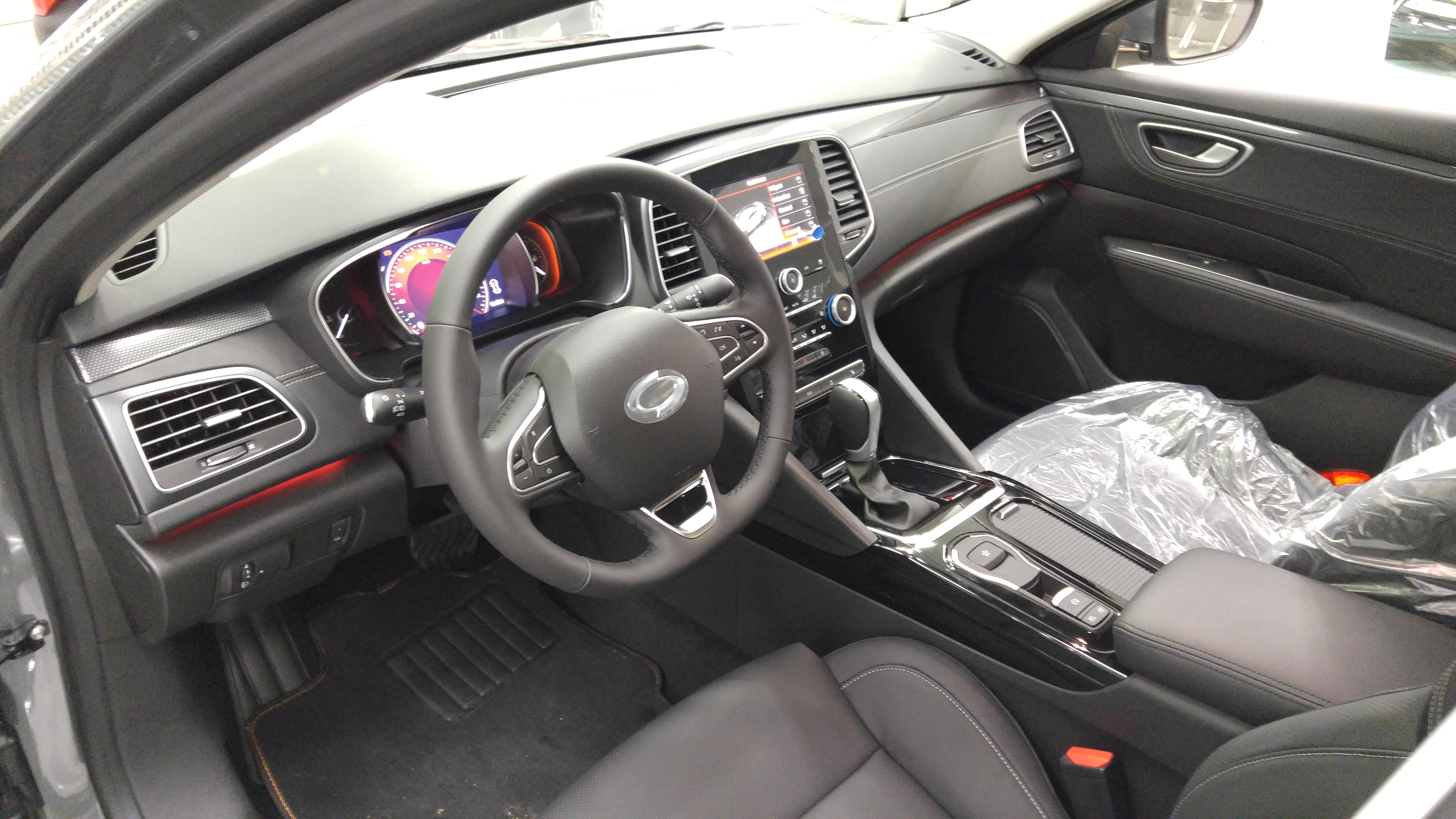
Renault Samsung SM6 interior (pre-facelift)

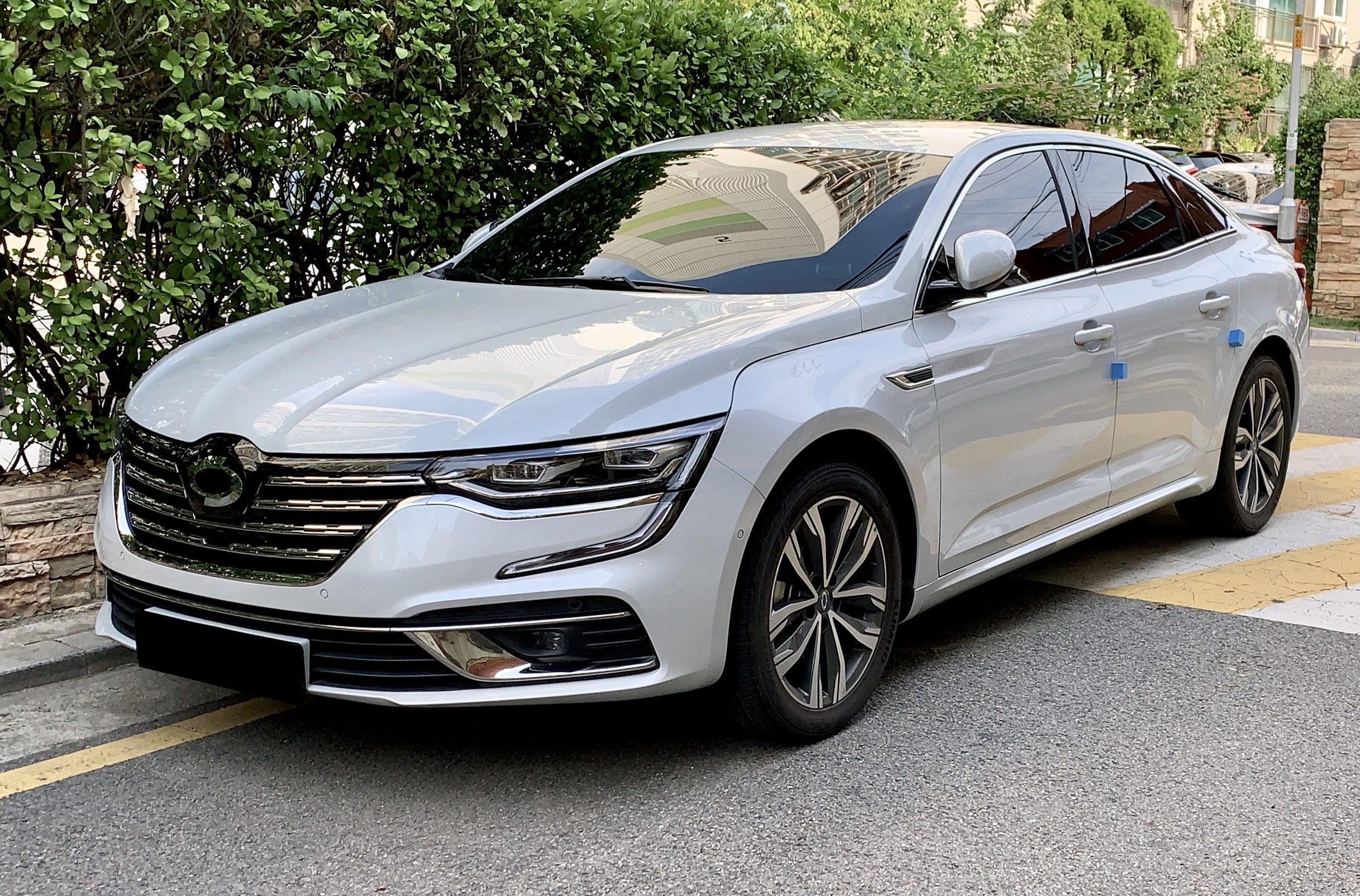
Renault Samsung SM6 (facelift)

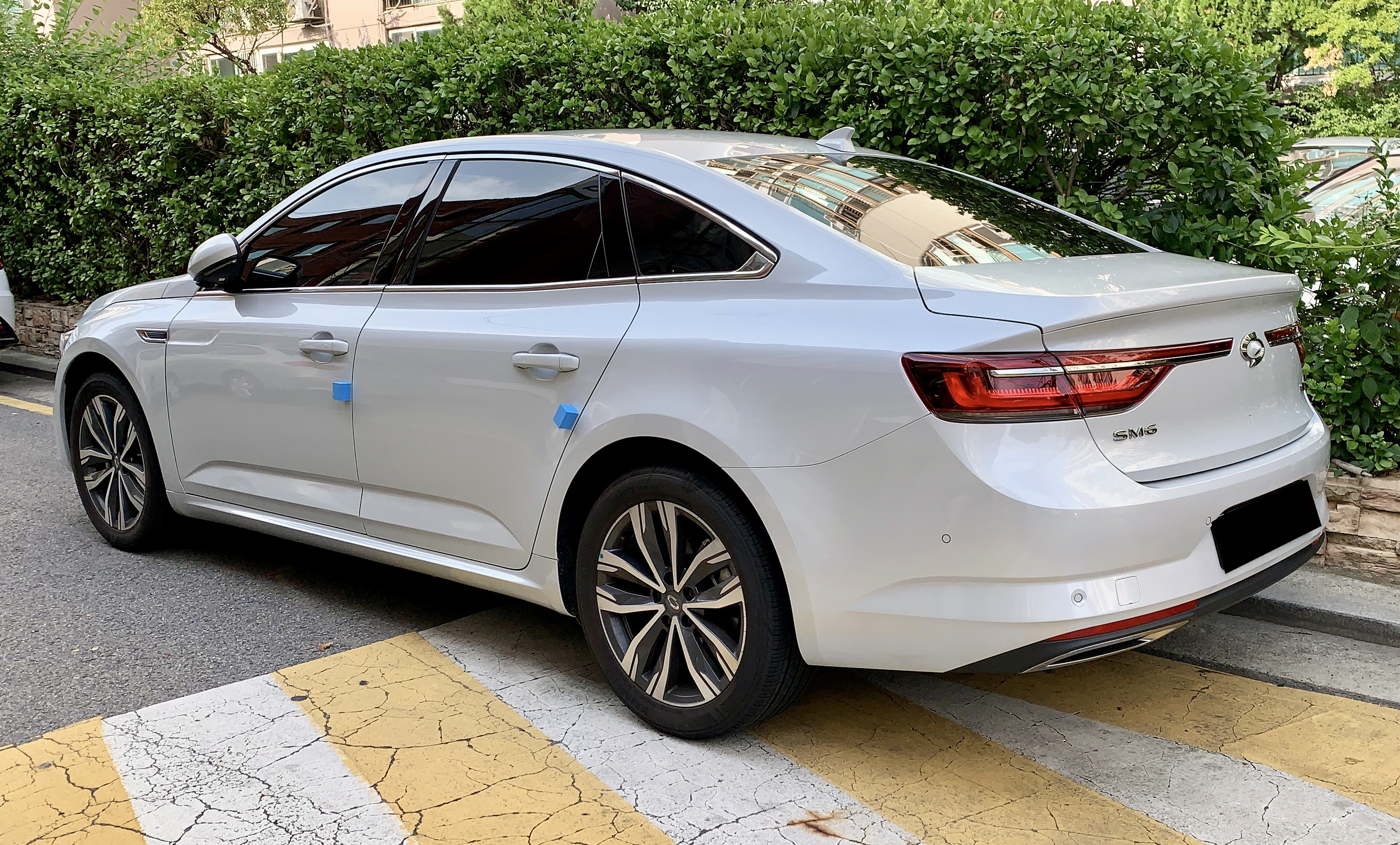
Renault Samsung SM6 (facelift)

== Recalls ==
Renault Samsung ordered a recall of 94,069 Renault Samsung SM6s due to concerns of loose plastic covers on accelerator and brake pedals uncovered in a safety investigation. The company was fined 611 million won (US$530,000) by the Ministry of Land, Infrastructure and Transport for violating vehicle safety regulations.

== Talisman concept ==
The Renault Talisman concept

The first use of the Renault Talisman name is on an unrelated concept car designed along the 1995 Renault Initiale Concept by Renault chief designer Patrick Le Quément. Initially known as the Renault Z12 it was presented at the Frankfurt Motor Show in September 2001. The Talisman concept was a three-door 2+2 coupé with two gullwing doors and was fitted with a 4.5-liter V8 engine from Nissan.
