= Nissan Qashqai =

Compact crossover SUV

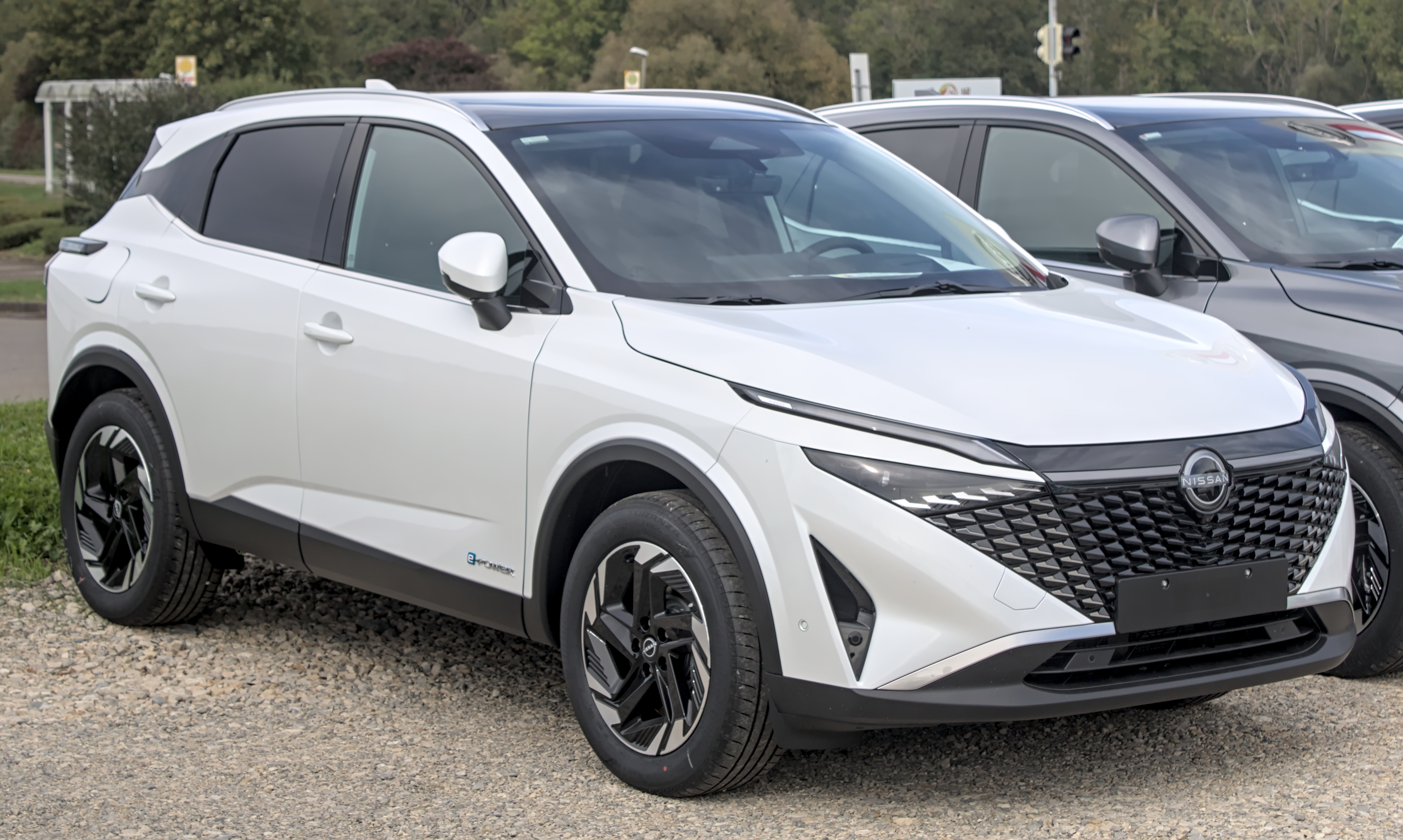
- Nissan Qashqai e-Power

Overview
- Manufacturer: Nissan
- Also called: Nissan Dualis (Japan and Australia, 2006–2013); Nissan Rogue Sport (United States, 2017–2022)
- Production: 2006–present

Body and chassis
- Class: Compact SUV (C-segment)
- Body style: 5-door crossover SUV
- Layout: Front-engine, front-wheel-drive Front-engine, four-wheel-drive

The Nissan Qashqai (/ˈkæʃkaɪ/) is a compact SUV (C-segment) designed and produced by the Japanese car manufacturer Nissan since 2006. The first generation of the vehicle was sold as the Nissan Dualis (Japanese: 日産・デュアリス, Hepburn: Nissan Dyuarisu) in Japan and Australia, and Qashqai in the rest of the world. The second generation, launched in late-2013 for the 2014 model year, was not sold in Japan and was badged as the Qashqai in all countries it was sold, except in the United States, where it was rebadged as the Nissan Rogue Sport. Since the third and latest generation model launched in 2021, the Qashqai is available with hybrid powertrains.

Nissan named the vehicle after the Qashqai people, originally a nomadic people who live in mountainous Central and Southwestern Iran. As of 2023, for the European and Australian market the Qashqai is positioned between the Juke and the X-Trail in Nissan's crossover SUV lineup with the latter sharing platform with the Qashqai.

== Background ==
When the Renault–Nissan Alliance was formed in 1999, Nissan's new COO Carlos Ghosn instructed the company to transform its product portfolio in Europe. The C-segment Almera, a slow-seller in Europe became its primary focus. In early 2002, 25 European Nissan engineers travelled to the brand’s technical centre in Japan to start of a 12-month project to develop the successor of the Almera. It was projected to be a larger car to compete with the SEAT Altea and Volkswagen Golf Plus.

In December 2002, Nissan concluded that the planned C-segment model would not be as profitable and competitive as was required. The development team eventually proposed the idea of a "mini-Murano" type of vehicle smaller than the X-Trail that would be positioned to compete with C-segment hatchback and saloons. The development was focused on creating a European-oriented vehicle with the desirability, practicality and versatility of an SUV but with the size, driving dynamics and running costs of a family hatchback. While engineering work was done by Nissan's European Technical Centre (NTCE), a design proposal was put forward by Nissan Design Europe (NDE), which became the 2004 Qashqai concept. During final development, Nissan decided the Qashqai would serve as a replacement for both the Almera in the C-segment and Primera in the D-segment. Nissan selected Nissan Motor Manufacturing UK as its manufacturing plant for the European market and presented the production Qashqai in 2006.

== First generation (J10; 2006) ==
First generation
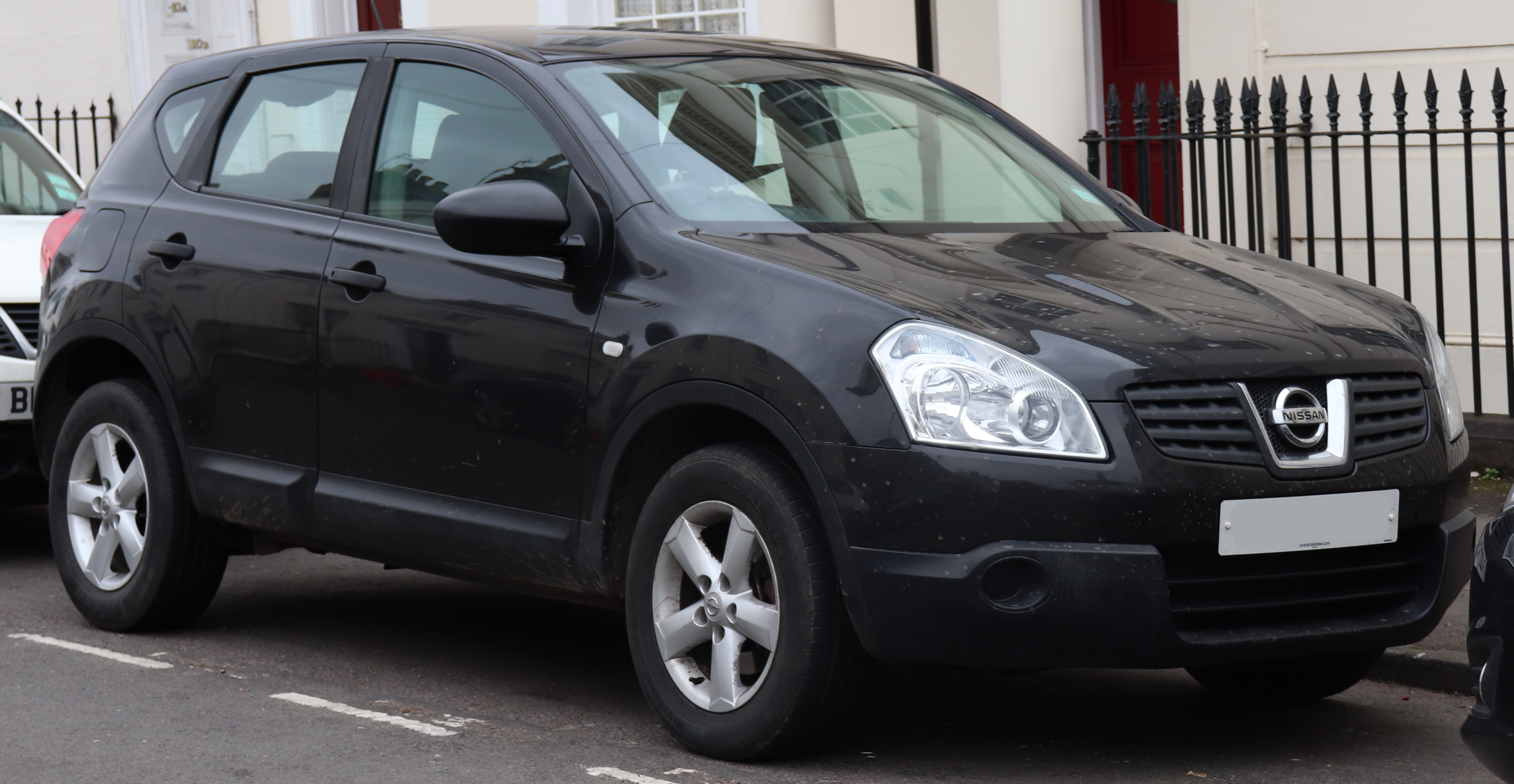

Overview
- Model code: J10
- Also called: Nissan Dualis (Japan and Australia)
- Production: 2006–2013
- Assembly: United Kingdom: Sunderland (NMUK, Europe and Turkey domestic market models only); Japan: Kanda, Fukuoka (JDM (Nissan Dualis) models only); China: Xiangfan (Dongfeng Nissan, Far East models only); Iran: Tehran (Pars Khodro, Iran domestic market models only)
- Designer: Darryl Scriven, Masaki Aikawa and Patrick Reimer (pre-facelift)

Body and chassis
- Platform: Renault–Nissan C platform
- Related: Nissan Rogue (S35); Nissan X-Trail (T31); Venucia T70

Powertrain
- Engine: Petrol: 1.6 L HR16DE I4; 2.0 L MR20DE I4; Diesel: 1.5 L K9K dCi turbo I4; 1.6 L R9M dCi turbo I4; 2.0 L M9R turbo I4
- Transmission: 5/6-speed manual; 6-speed automatic; CVT

Dimensions
- Wheelbase: 2,630 mm (103.5 in); 2,760 mm (108.7 in) (Qashqai+2)
- Length: 4,315 mm (169.9 in); 4,535 mm (178.5 in) (Qashqai+2)
- Width: 1,785 mm (70.3 in)
- Height: 1,605 mm (63.2 in)

Chronology
- Successor: Nissan Juke (Dualis, Japan); Nissan X-Trail (Qashqai+2)

First unveiled as a concept vehicle at the 2004 Geneva Motor Show, the first-generation Qashqai was globally presented at the 2006 Paris Motor Show. It went on sale in February 2007, and Nissan aimed for more than 100,000 sales a year. Codenamed P32L, Nissan said the car would cater to buyers who want a more dynamic design, but are not attracted to the large, traditionally upright nature of an SUV. The car slots below the X-Trail in the Nissan range and partially replaces the conventional Primera and the smaller Almera. It is the first model to be styled by Nissan Design Europe in London, with engineering development led by Nissan Technical Centre Europe (NTCE) in Cranfield, Bedfordshire.

The first-generation Qashqai sold more than 1.24 million units in Europe during its seven year production run. From the UK, the first-generation Qashqai was also exported to the Middle East and other overseas markets.

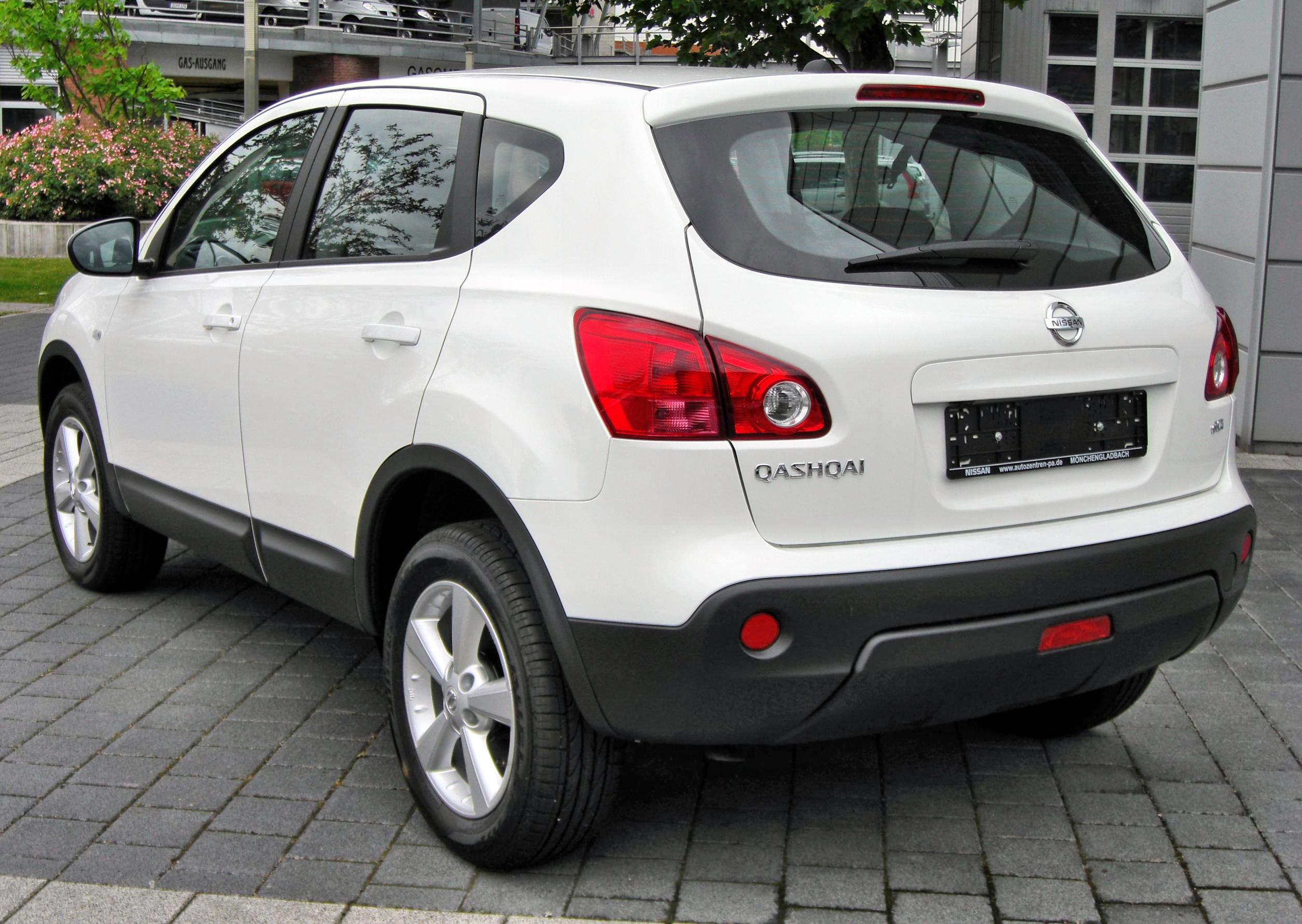
Rear view

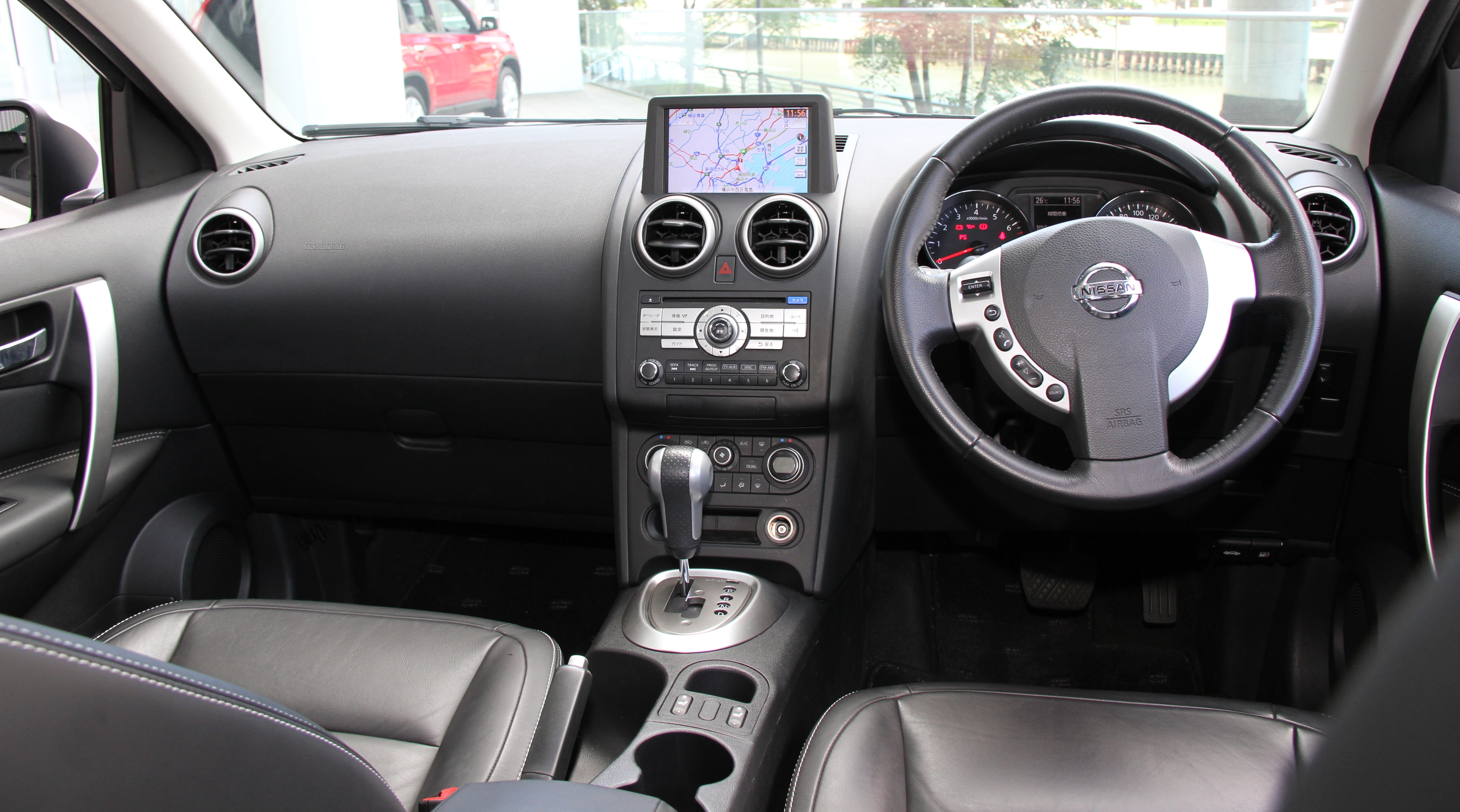
Interior

=== Name ===
Nissan considered releasing the Chinese version as the CCUV (Compact Crossover Utility Vehicle). In Australia, the first-generation Qashqai carries the name Dualis from the Japanese market because Nissan worried Qashqai could be pronounced "cash cow". The press has often used that pun to describe the sales success of the model.

=== Production ===
The Qashqai has been built at the Nissan Motor Manufacturing UK (NMUK) plant in Sunderland, Tyne and Wear, United Kingdom, since December 2006. It occupied the production line previously used to assemble the Primera on Line 1 and a percentage of Almera from line 2.

=== Qashqai+2 (NJ10) ===
Production of the Qashqai+2, a seven-seat model, began at the UK plant in July 2008. Launched in October 2008, it is a larger variant of the standard model, with the wheelbase extended by 135 mm (5.3 in). The car's overall length is extended by 211 mm (8.3 in) to allow for a third row of seats, and roof height is increased by 38 mm (1.5 in) at the rear. The chassis is unique from the A-pillar back, while trim and engine models remain identical to the standard Qashqai.

The Qashqai+2 was discontinued in 2013, and replaced by the T32 X-Trail with a seven-seat configuration.

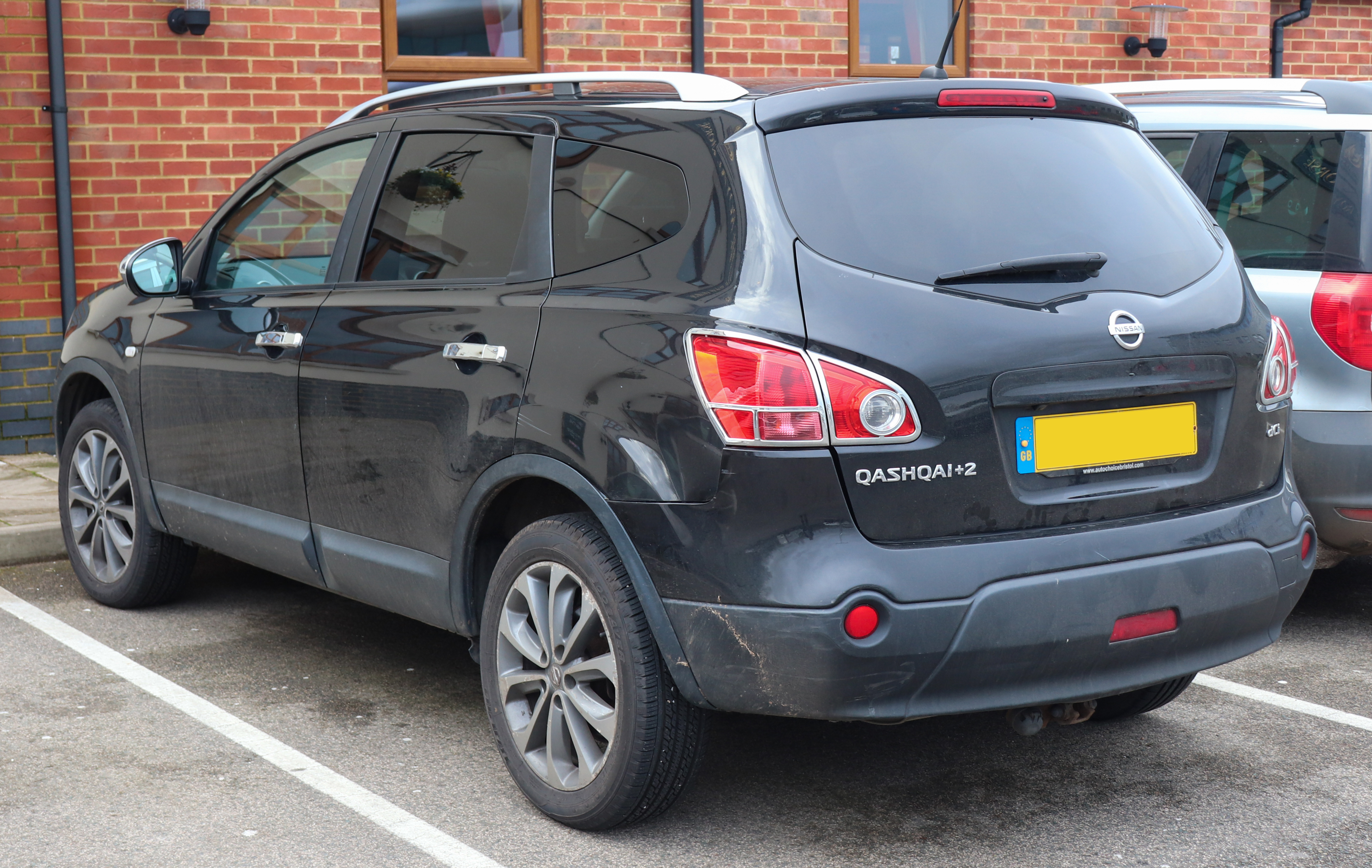
Nissan Qashqai+2 (pre-facelift)

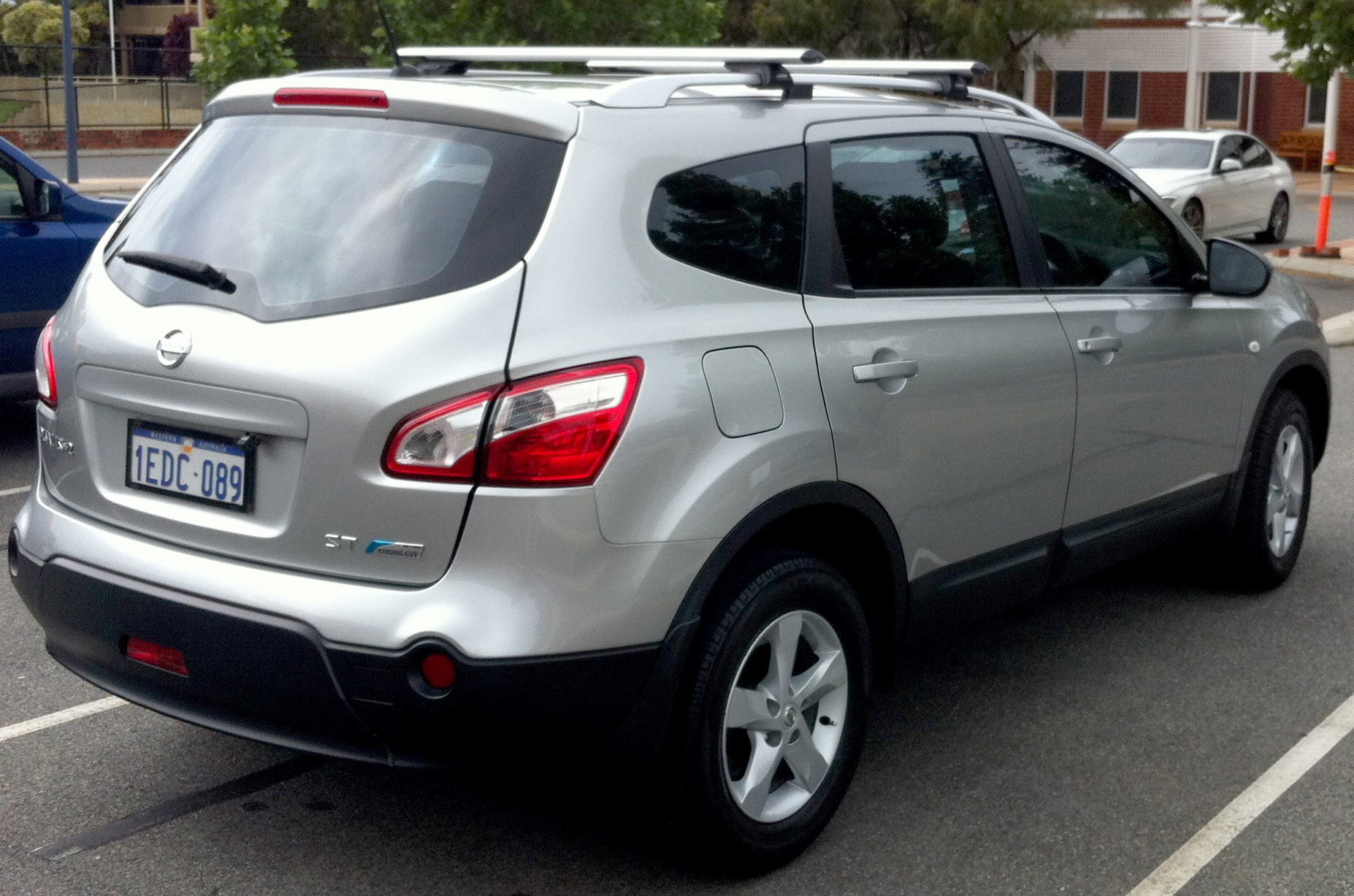
Nissan Dualis+2 (facelift)

=== 2009 facelift ===
In December 2009, Nissan announced a refreshed version of the first-generation Qashqai, which went on sale in March 2010. The model's front end has been completely restyled, while the rear included LED tail lights. Modifications to the interior include a new instrument panel layout for the vehicle's drive computer, better soundproofing and minor storage additions.

In the European market, electronic stability control became standard across the range and two new exterior colours have been added. An "eco-friendly" Pure Drive variant was also introduced.

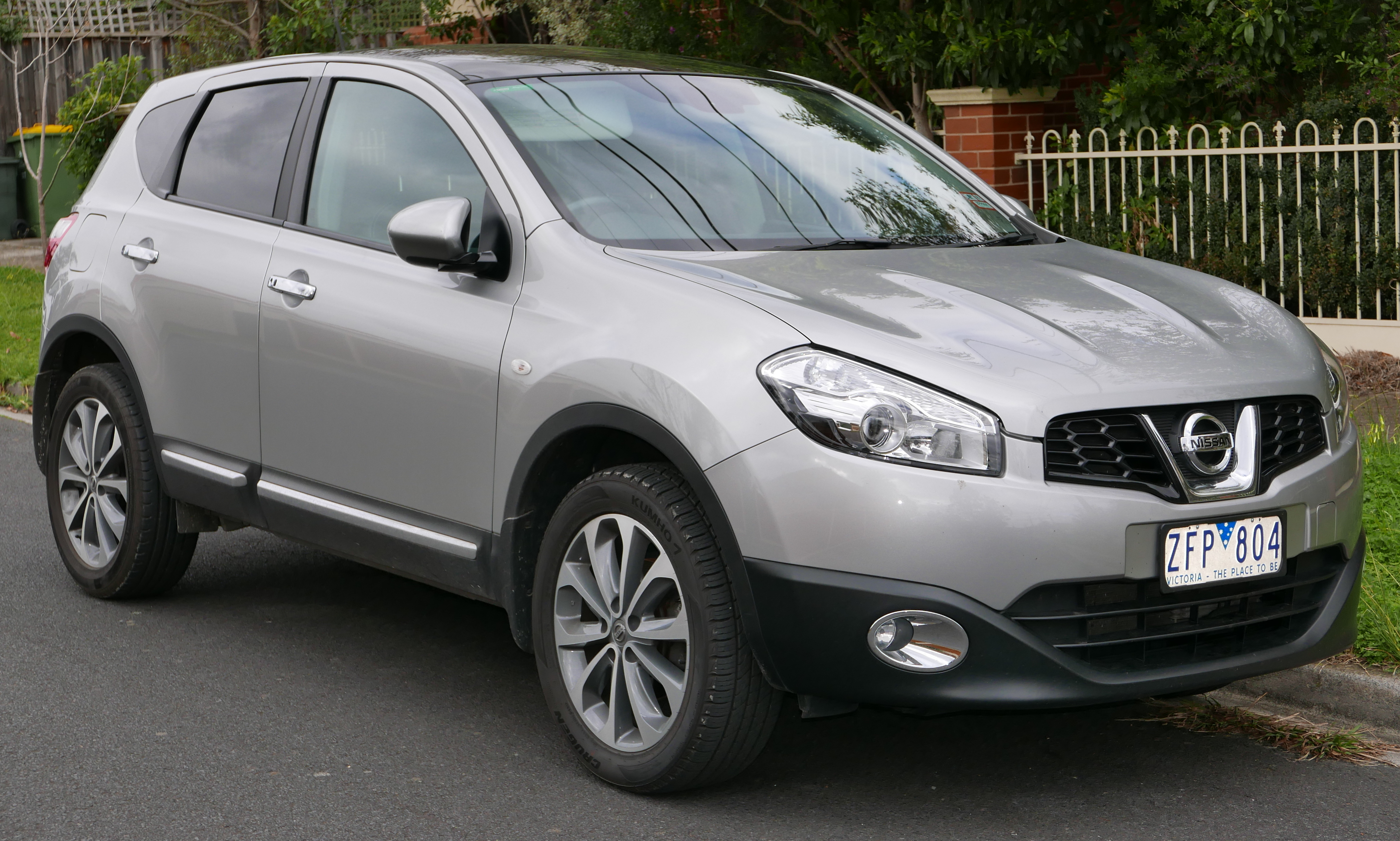
Nissan Dualis (facelift)

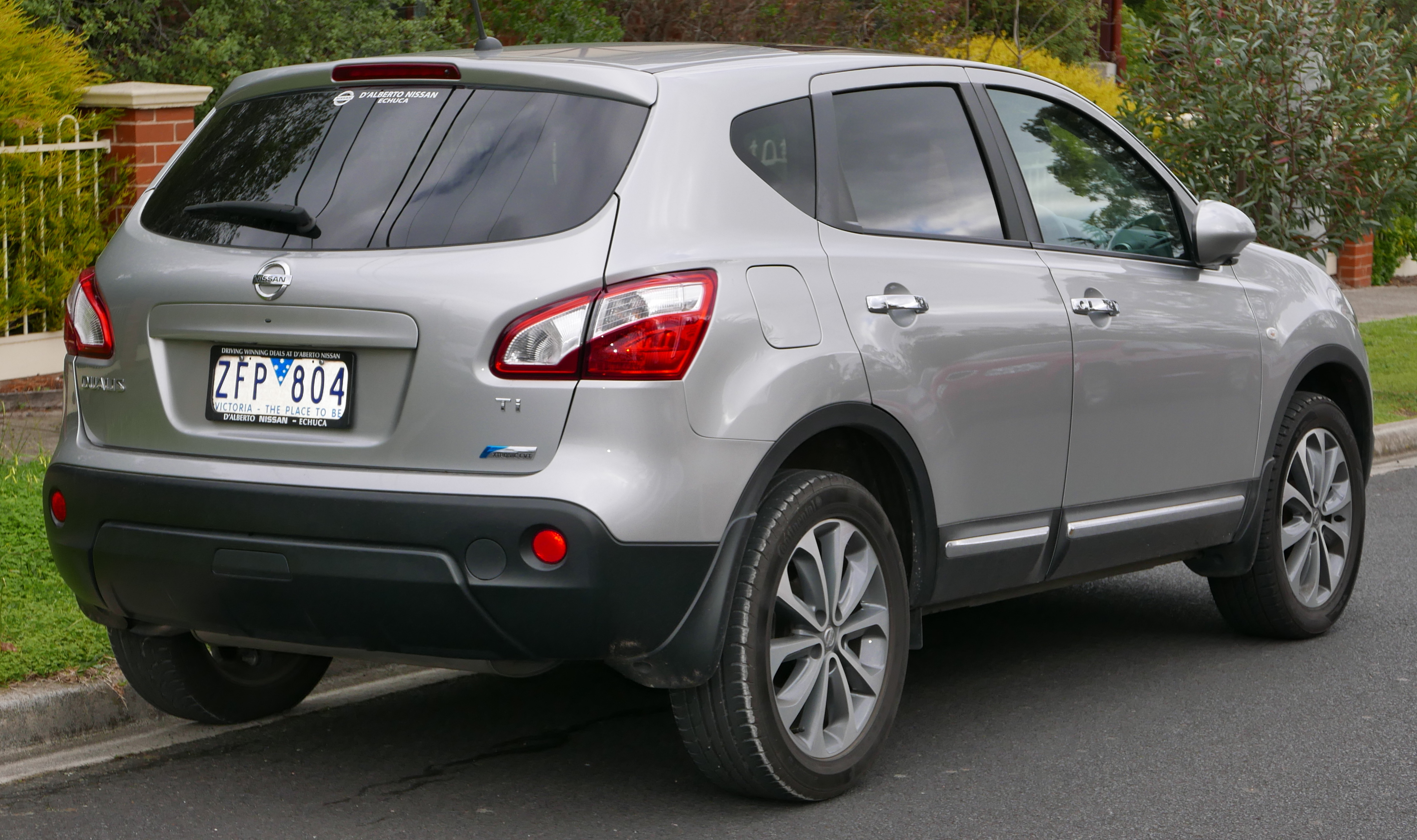
Nissan Dualis (facelift)

=== 2011 engine update ===
A new 1.6 dCi engine replaces the previous 2.0 dCi. Peak power was down from 110 kW (148 bhp; 150 PS) to 96 kW (129 bhp; 131 PS), but there is the same 320 N⋅m (240 lb⋅ft) of torque, available at 1750 rpm, rather than 2000 rpm. Nissan has not released full performance figures, but says the 1.6 dCi has a quicker 50–80 km/h (31–50 mph) acceleration figure than the 2.0 dCi.

Nissan has also added its Around View Monitor as standard equipment for 360 (replaces N-tec) versions of the Qashqai and Qashqai+2. The system uses a set of external cameras to create a 360 degree "bird's eye" view of the car to help with parking manoeuvres. The driver can also focus individually on front, rear or passenger cameras to look out for a particular obstacle.

== Second generation (J11; 2013) ==
Second generation
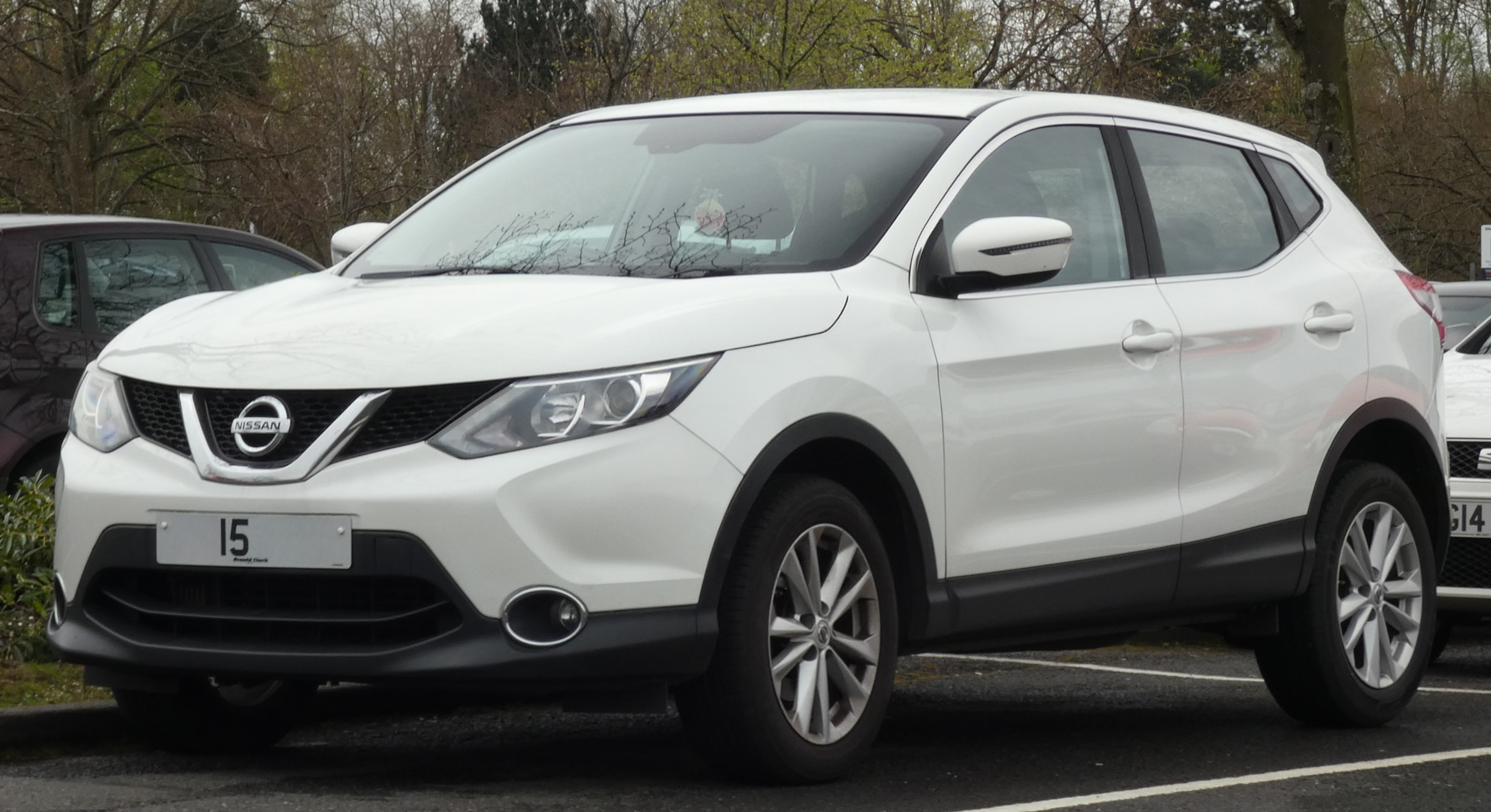
- Nissan Qashqai Acenta (UK; pre-facelift)

Overview
- Model code: J11
- Also called: Nissan Rogue Sport (United States); Nissan Qashqai Classic (China, 2023–2024); Nissan Qashqai Glory (China, 2024–present)
- Production: 2013–2021 (Europe); 2015–present (China); 2019–2022 (Russia)
- Model years: 2017–2022 (United States)
- Assembly: United Kingdom: Sunderland (NMUK); China: Wuhan, Hubei (Dongfeng Nissan); Russia: Saint Petersburg; Japan: Fukuoka (Nissan Motor Kyushu, Rogue Sport)

Body and chassis
- Platform: Renault–Nissan CMF-CD platform
- Related: Nissan X-Trail/Rogue (T32); Nissan Pulsar (C13); Renault Kadjar

Powertrain
- Engine: Petrol: 1.2 L HR12DDT DIG-T I4; 1.3 L HR13DDT DIG-T I4; 1.6 L MR16DDT DIG-T I4; 2.0 L MR20DE I4; 2.0 L MR20DD I4; Diesel: 1.5 L K9K dCi I4; 1.6 L R9M dCi I4; 1.7 L R9N dCi I4
- Transmission: 6-speed manual; CVT X-Tronic (1.2 gasoline and 1.6 diesel); 7-speed Getrag 7DCT300 DCT (1.3 gasoline, facelift 1.5 and 1.7 diesel)

Dimensions
- Wheelbase: 2,646 mm (104.2 in)
- Length: 4,370–4,394 mm (172.0–173.0 in)
- Width: 1,800–1,806 mm (70.9–71.1 in)
- Height: 1,590–1,595 mm (62.6–62.8 in)

Chronology
- Predecessor: Nissan Rogue Select (for North America)

The Qashqai J11 was introduced in London on 7 November 2013 at a worldwide streamed launch. The vehicle is larger and based on an all-new CMF-CD platform shared with the Nissan X-Trail/Rogue and Renault Kadjar. It went on sale in the UK in February 2014. The Qashqai J11 was awarded What Car? "Car of the Year" 2014.

The Dualis nameplate has been discontinued in Japan, as the second generation Qashqai is not sold there. At the time, Nissan Japan instead offered the smaller Juke, and the third-generation X-Trail.

The first generation model with the Dualis nameplate was sold alongside the newer model, which has borne the Qashqai name in Australia since July 2014.

Globally, it was available in 1.6-litre petrol and turbo-diesel engines, 1.5-litre turbo-diesel, 1.2-litre petrol turbocharged engine and 2.0-litre petrol engine.

In September 2015, Nissan rolled a record-breaking 500,000th Qashqai off the production line at the UK plant, the fastest time for a vehicle built in the UK to reach a half million units.

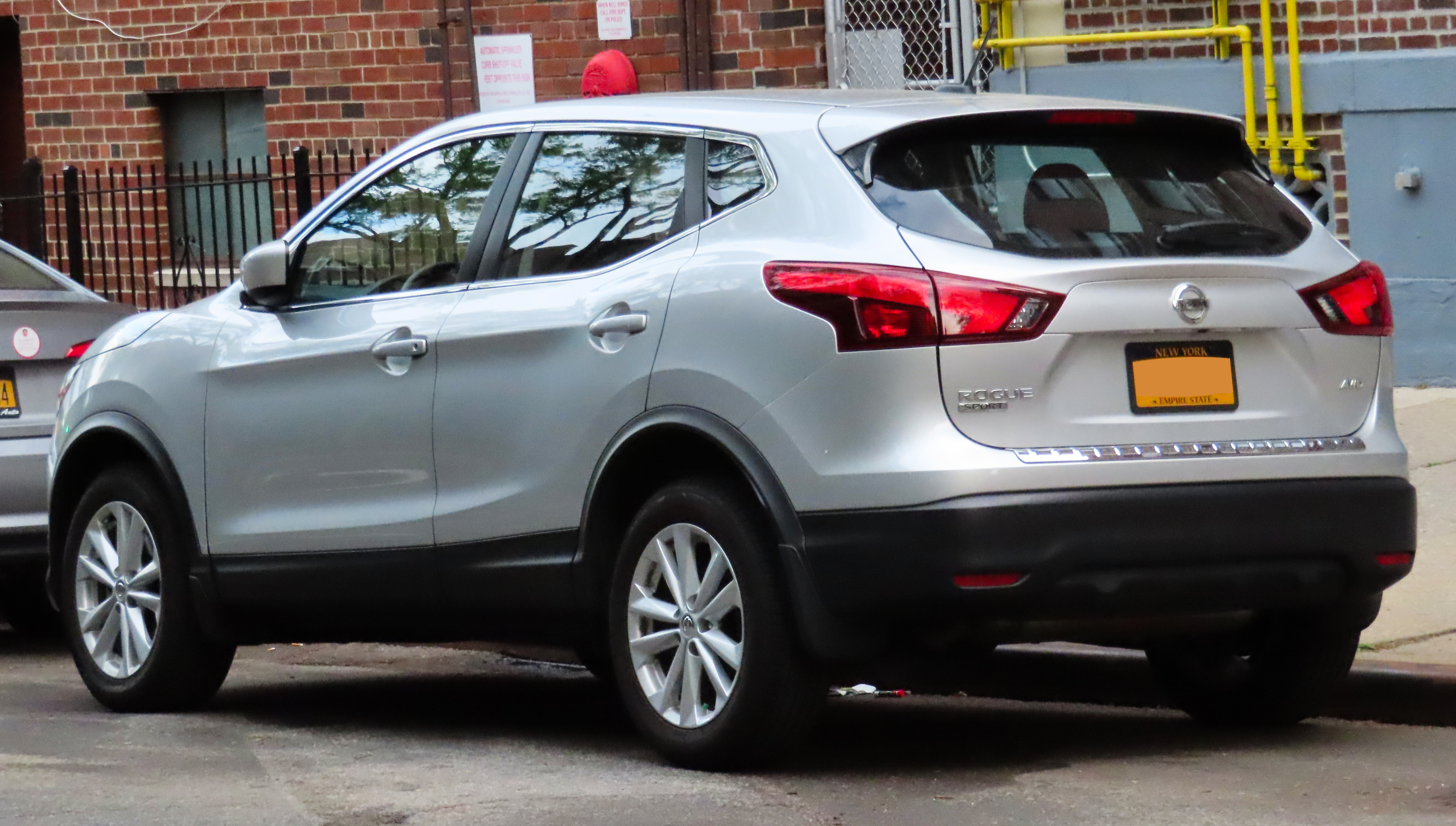
Nissan Rogue Sport (North America; pre-facelift)

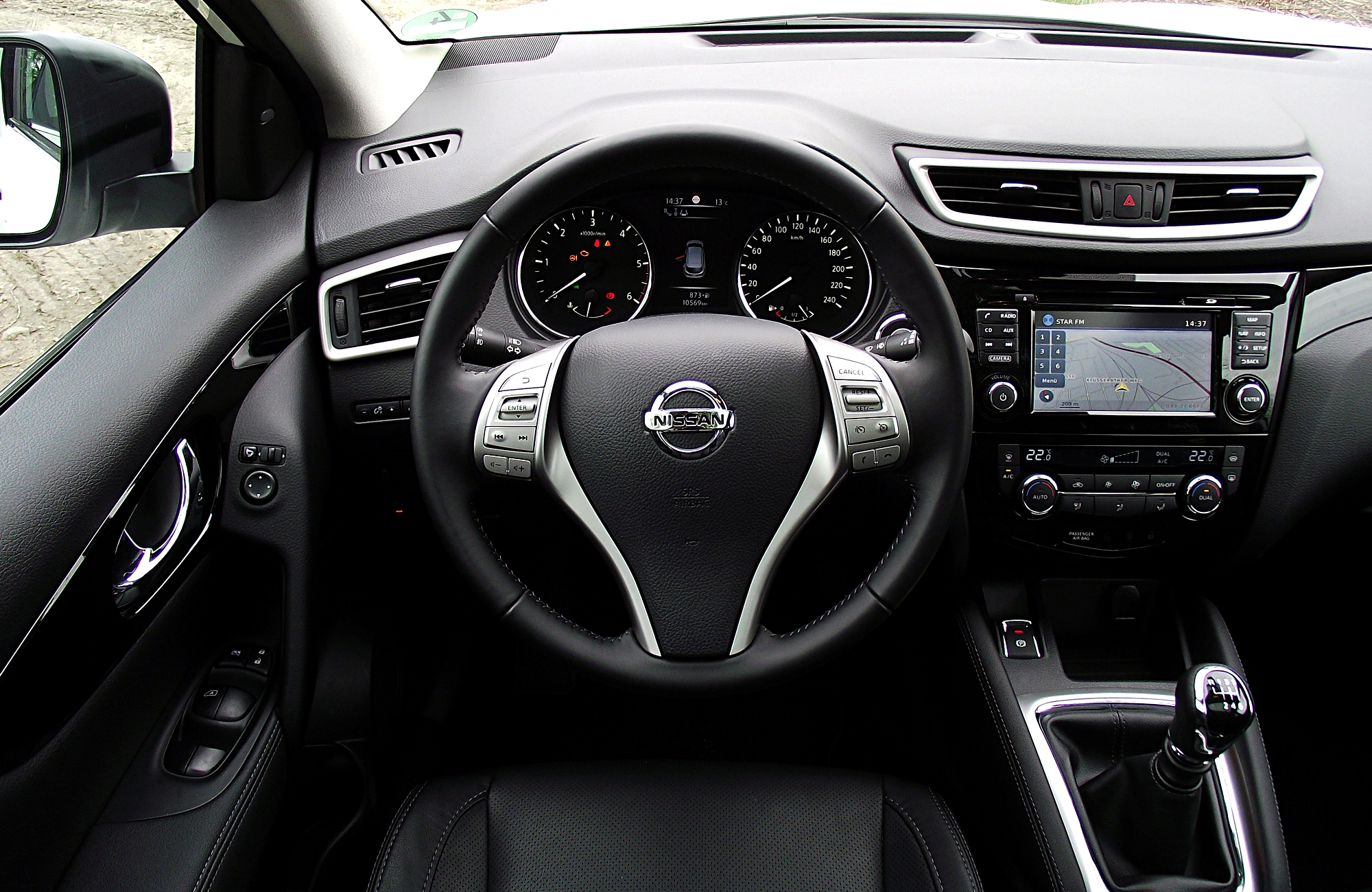
Interior (pre-facelift)

=== Facelift ===
On 27 October 2016, Nissan announced that the facelifted Qashqai J11 would be produced at the UK plant. The facelifted Qashqai was unveiled at the 2017 Geneva Motor Show. The facelift version only went on sale in the United States (as the Nissan Rogue Sport) beginning with the 2020 model year.

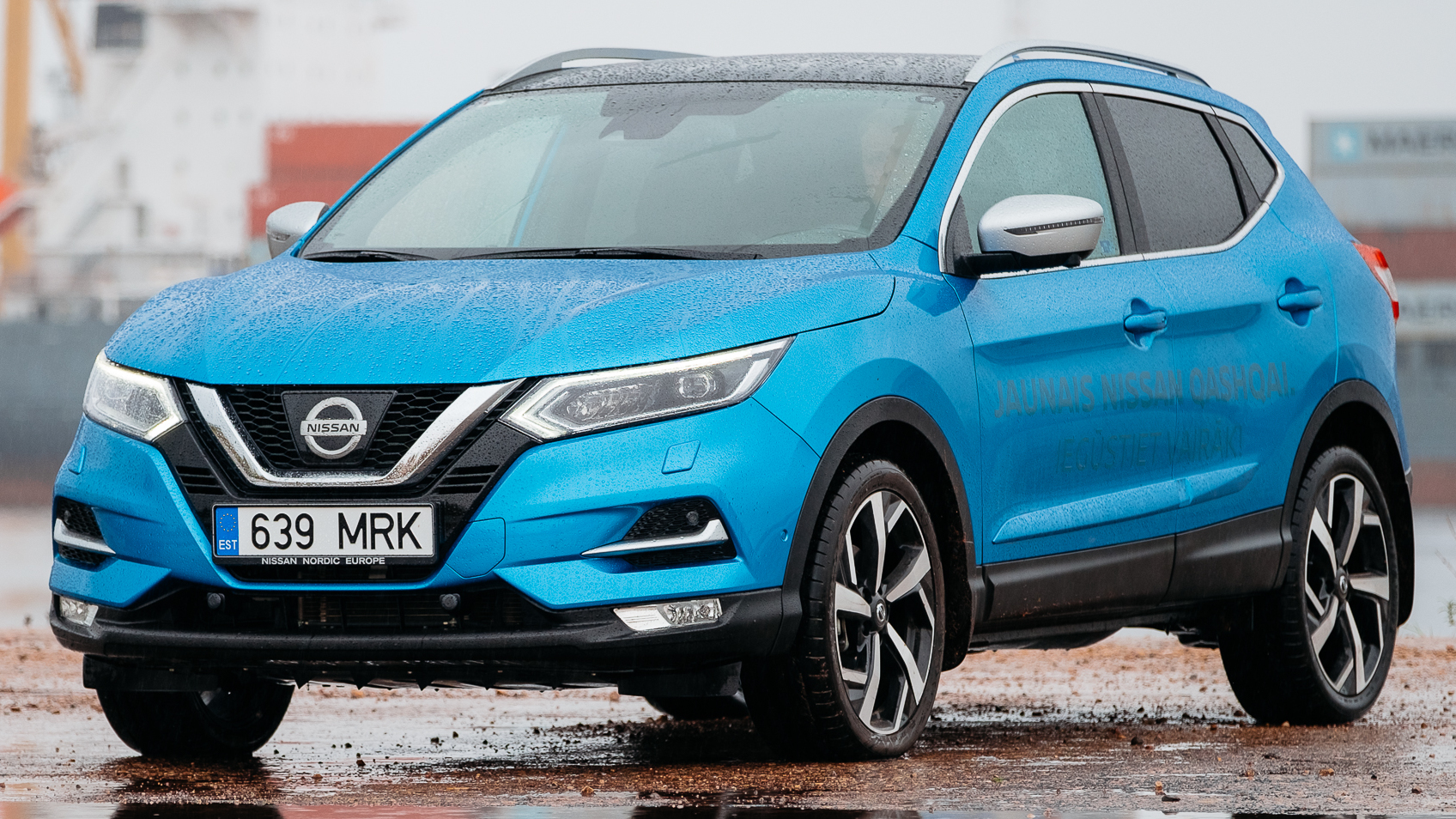
2017 Nissan Qashqai (facelift)

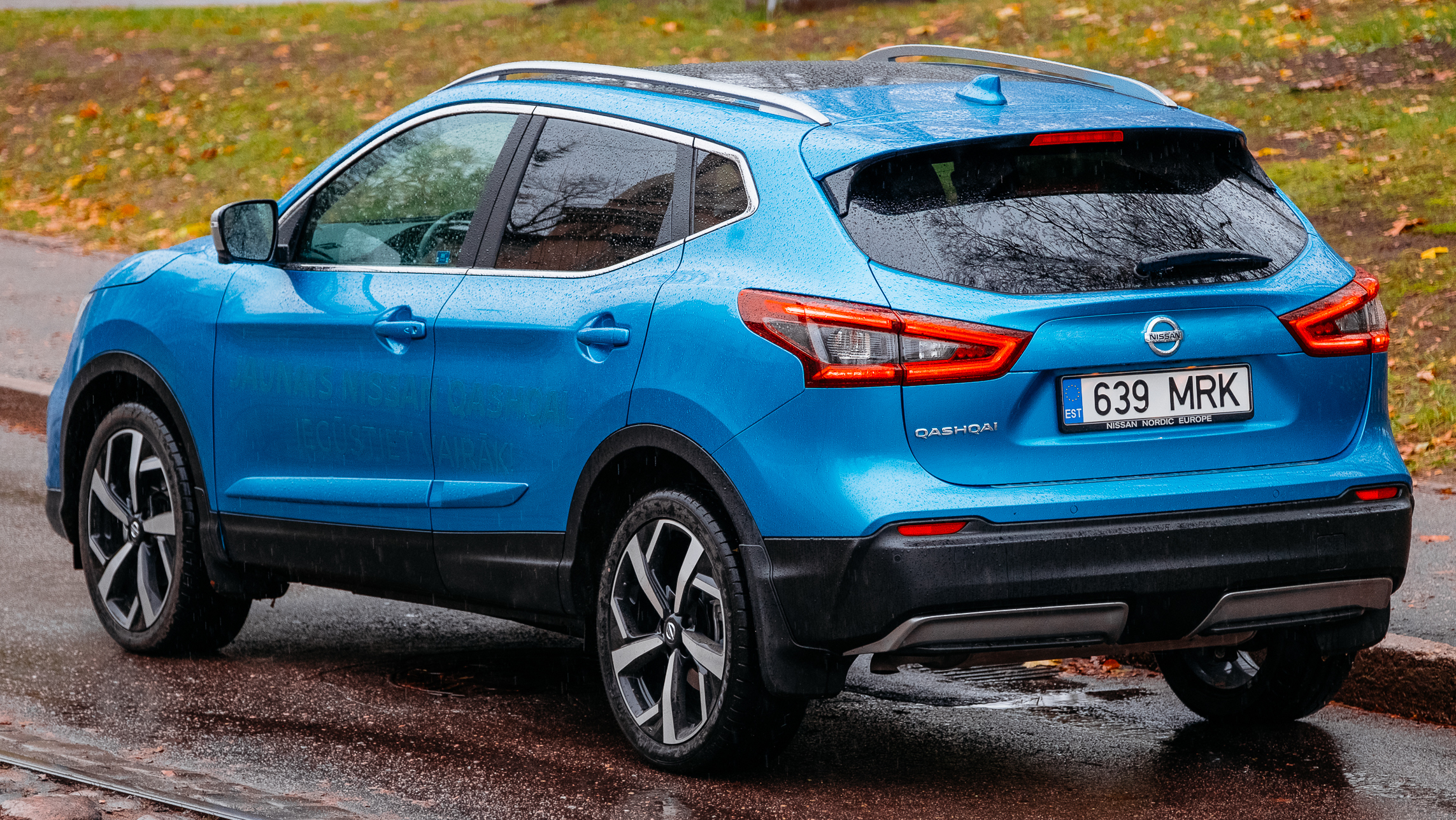
2017 Nissan Qashqai (facelift)

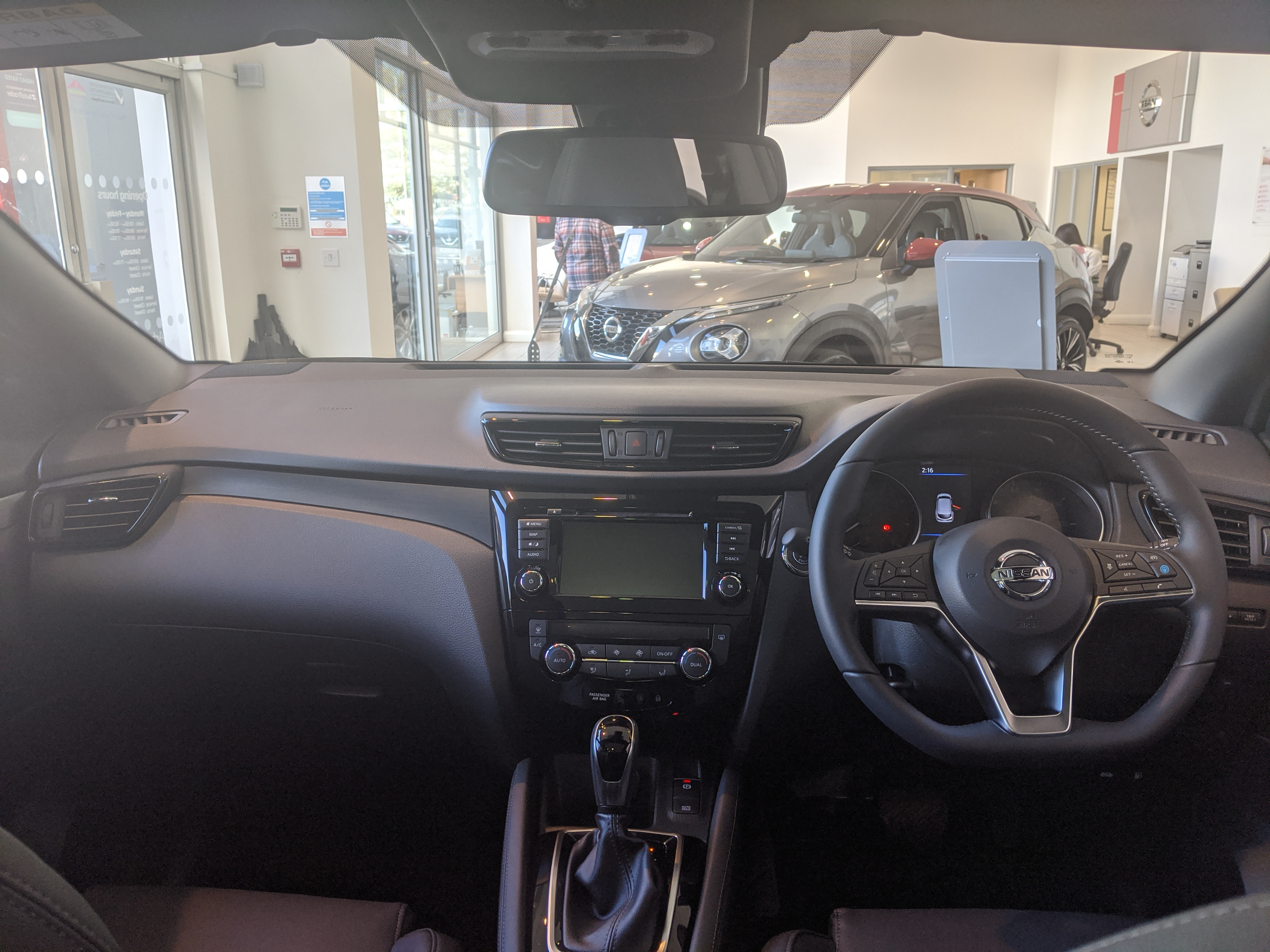
Interior (facelift)

=== Markets ===
==== North America ====
In July 2015, Nissan announced a smaller counterpart of the Rogue to be marketed in North America. At the 2017 North American International Auto Show in Detroit, Michigan, Nissan revealed the North American version of the Qashqai to slot between the Juke and the Rogue. For the U.S., it was known as the Rogue Sport to tie it in with the popular Rogue nameplate. In Canada, the Qashqai kept its original name.

Priced below the Rogue, the Rogue Sport replaces the Rogue Select, a version of the first-generation Nissan Rogue which has been discontinued from Nissan's lineup in the United States since 2015. The Rogue Sport went on sale in the United States in the second quarter of 2017 for the 2017 model year.

Due to the significant differences in regulation between the U.S. and Europe, Nissan's UK plant did not produce the Rogue Sport. Instead, the North American market Rogue Sport/Qashqai were sourced from Japan.

The US-market Rogue Sport and Canadian Qashqai is powered by a 2.0-litre, 141 hp (143 PS; 105 kW) inline-four petrol engine paired with CVT. It was offered in three trim levels, which consists of S, SV, and SL. Both front-wheel-drive and all-wheel-drive was offered.

For the 2020 model year, the US-market Rogue Sport and Canadian Qashqai got a refresh with a new front bumper cover and hood, new headlights and tail lights along with new alloy wheels. It went on sale in late 2019.

Production of the Rogue Sport ended in December 2022, making 2022 the final model year for the US. In Canada, the Qashqai was discontinued after the 2023 model year.

==== China ====
Dongfeng Nissan started marketing locally produced Qashqai in the Chinese market since 2015. Engine options available were 1.2-litre turbocharged petrol and 2.0-litre naturally aspirated petrol. All models are mated with Nissan's Xtronic CVT, except for the base 1.2-litre turbo variant which is mated with a six-speed manual gearbox. When the next generation Qashqai went on sale in 2023, it remained on sale alongside it as the Qashqai Classic, before being facelifted again as the Qashqai Glory.

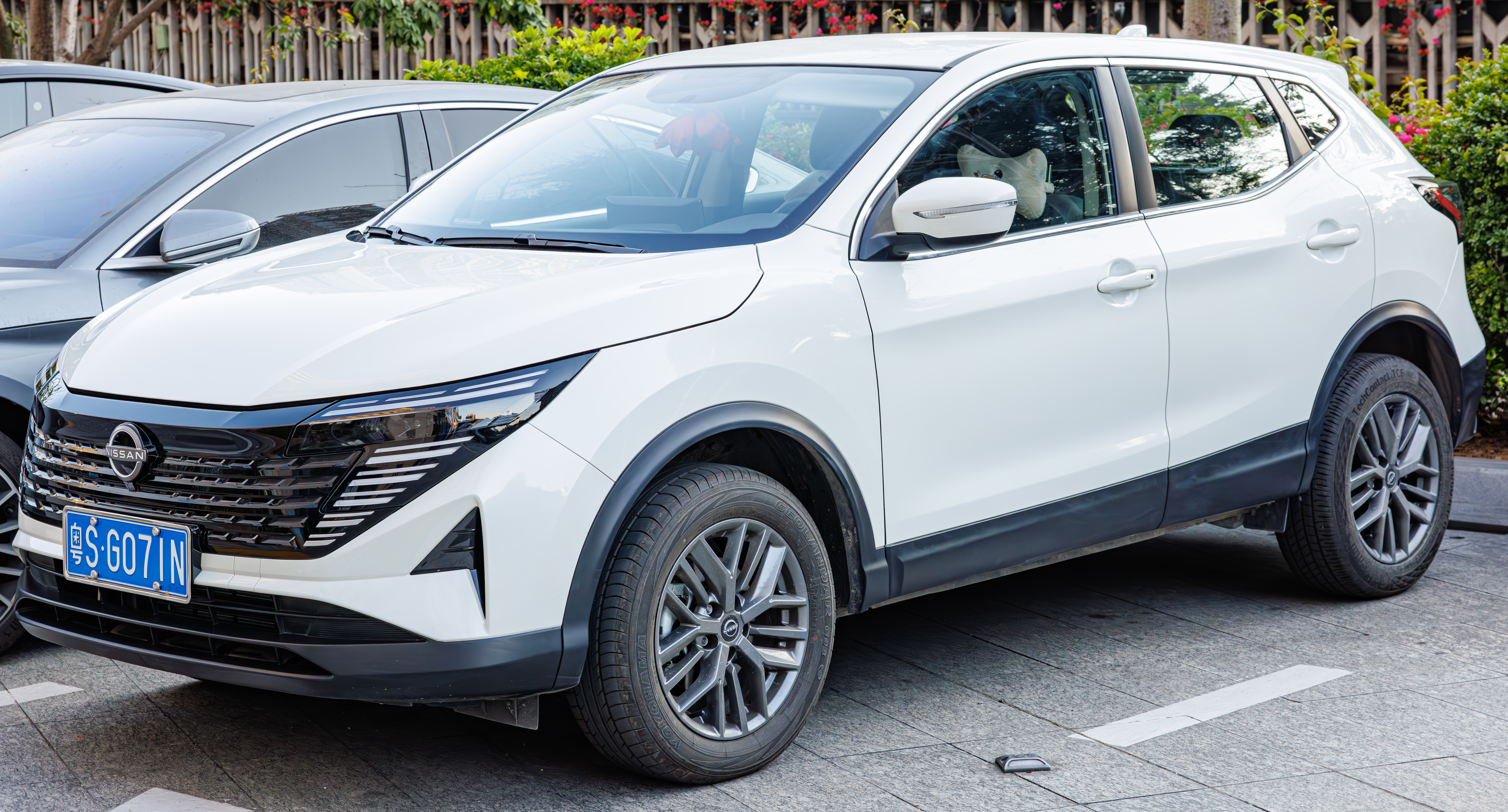
Nissan Qashqai Glory

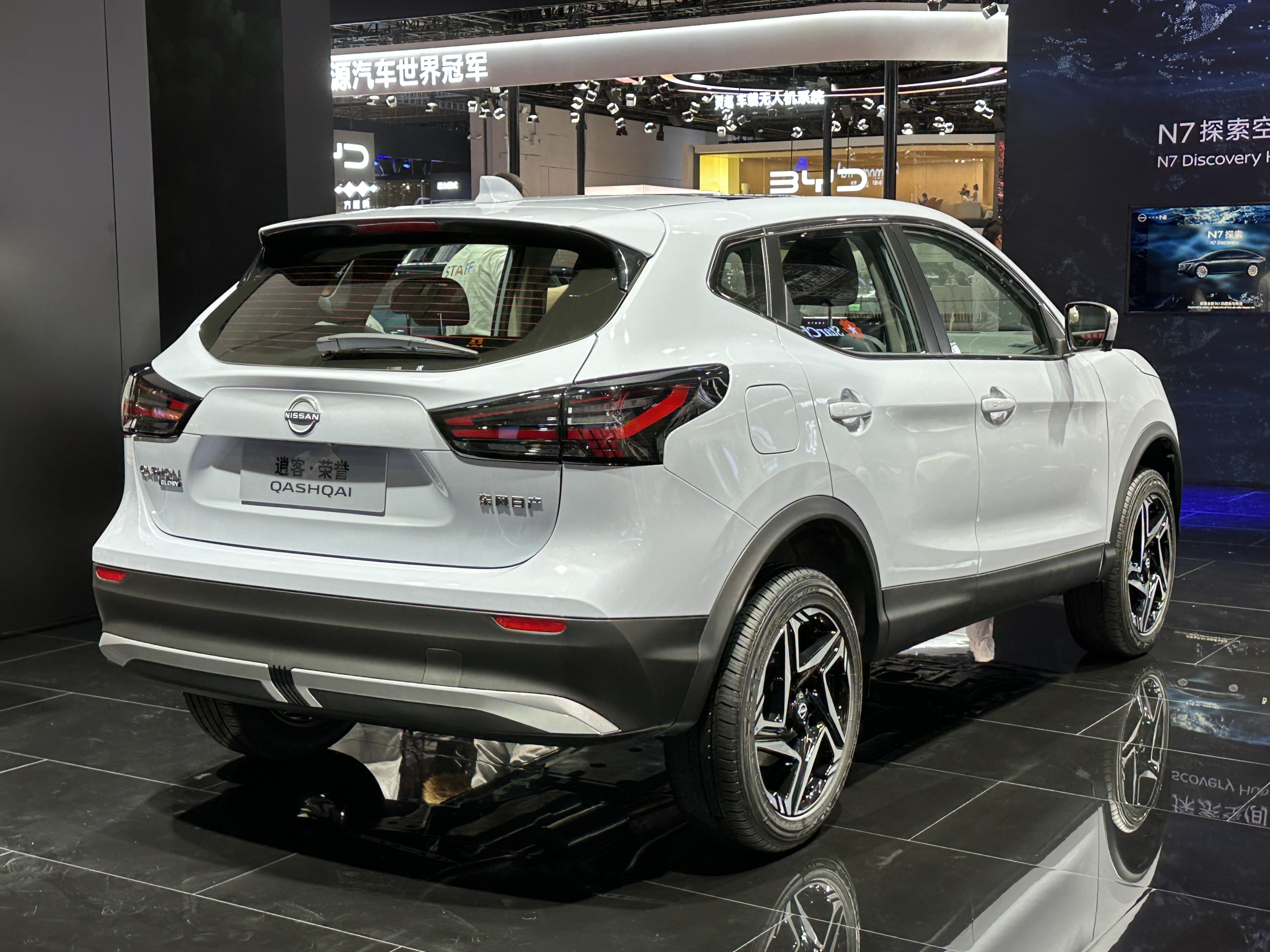
Qashqai Glory rear end

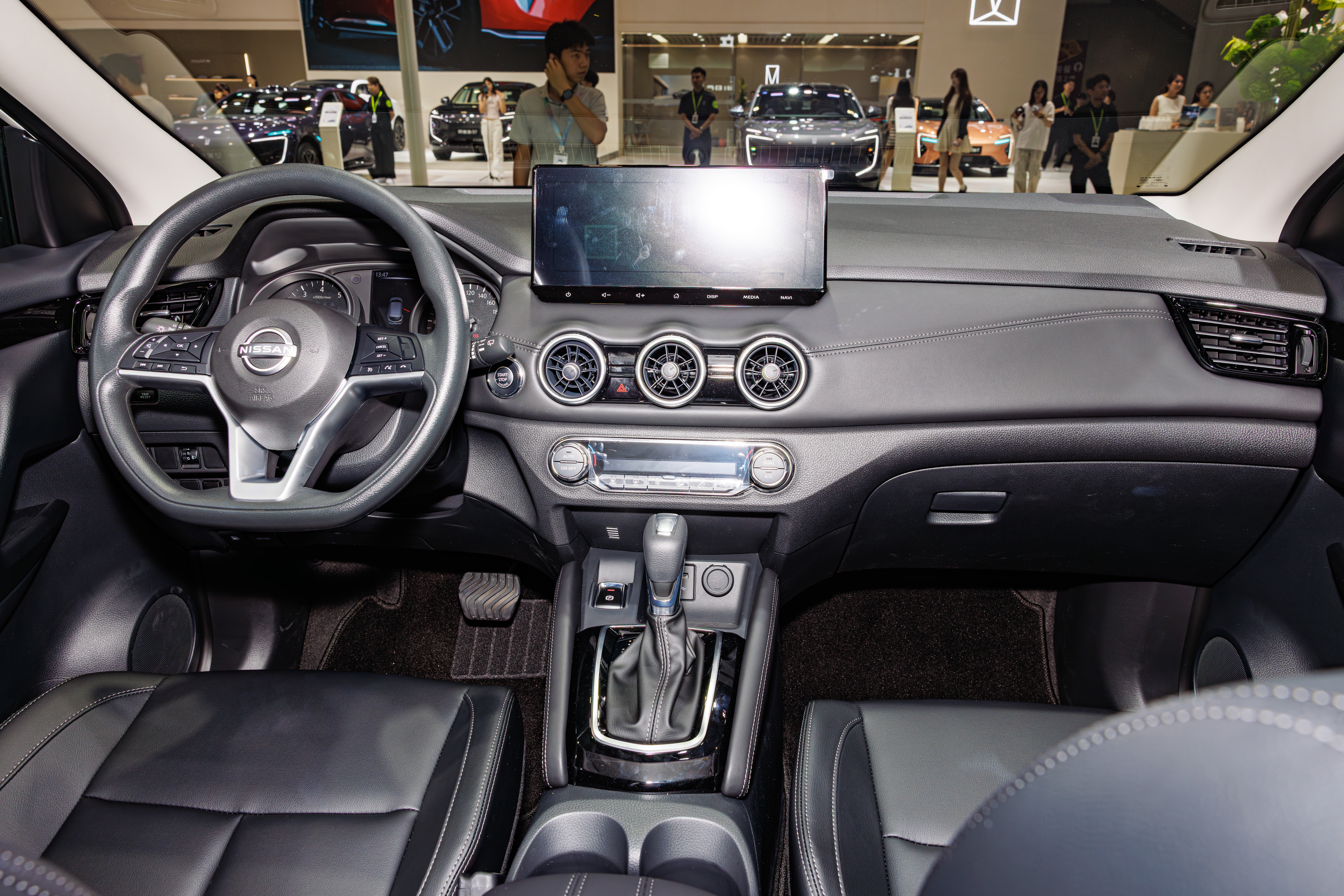
Qashqai Glory Interior

==== Russia ====
Since 2014, the second-generation Qashqai was assembled in Nissan's Russian plant in Saint Petersburg in order to free up some production capacity in the UK plant and avoid import tariffs. Nissan stopped assembling Qashqai at their St. Petersburg plant from March 2022 and went on to exit the Russian market entirely, selling its factory for 1 Euro.

=== South Korea ===
The Nissan Qashqai was introduced to the South Korean market on 13 November 2014 by defunct manufacturer Nissan Korea. However, sales were later suspended due to an emissions manipulation scandal.

In 2016, Nissan was accused of emission cheating with the UK-Built Nissan Qashqai by South Korea. The Japanese company was fined ₩330 Million by the South Korean government for manipulation of emissions tests. The UK, however, found no evidence of emission cheating, noting that they had tested the older Euro 5 norm models, South Korea, by contrast tested the newer Euro 6 norm models.

According to South Korean claims, Nissan installed a defeat device to reduce the emissions of Nitrogen Oxide during the test. The South Korean regulator tested the emissions of 20 diesel vehicles after the VW diesel scandal and found the Qashqai to be the only one that failed the tests.

Finally, in May 11, 2017. Due to the emissions scandal, sales of the Nissan Qashqai in South Korea were banned by the South Korean Government.

Some models of the South Korean Nissan Qashqai were sold through some Second-hand car exporters like Be Forward.

=== Powertrain ===
Petrol engines
Model	Year(s)	Displacement	Power	Torque	0–100 km/h (0–62 mph)	CO_{2} emissions
1.3i DIG-T 4X2 HR13DDT DCT	2018–present	1,332 cc (81.3 cu in)	159 PS (117 kW; 157 bhp)	270 N⋅m (199 ft⋅lb_{f})	10.2 s	162 g/km (WLTP)
1.3i DIG-T 4X2 HR13DDT	2018–present	1,332 cc (81.3 cu in)	159 PS (117 kW; 157 bhp)	260 N⋅m (192 ft⋅lb_{f})	10.2 s	162 g/km (WLTP)
1.2i DIG-T 4X2 HR12DDT	2013–present	1,199 cc (73.2 cu in)	116 PS (85 kW; 114 bhp)	190 N⋅m (140 ft⋅lb_{f})	10.6 s	129 g/km
1.2i DIG-T 4X2 XTRONIC	2014–present	1,199 cc (73.2 cu in)	116 PS (85 kW; 114 bhp)	165 N⋅m (122 ft⋅lb_{f})	12.9 s	129 g/km
1.6i DIG-T 4X2 MR16DDT	2014–present	1,618 cc (98.7 cu in)	163 PS (120 kW; 161 bhp)	240 N⋅m (177 ft⋅lb_{f})	9.1 s	134 g/km
MR20DE	2009–2013	1,997 cc (121.9 cu in)	140 PS (103 kW; 138 bhp)	200 N⋅m (148 ft⋅lb_{f})	10.53 s	
MR20DD	2014–present	1,997 cc (121.9 cu in)	147 PS (108 kW; 145 bhp)	201 N⋅m (148 ft⋅lb_{f})		

Diesel engines
Model	Year(s)	Displacement	Power	Torque	0–100 km/h (0–62 mph)	CO_{2} emissions
1.5 dCi 4X2	2013–present	1,461 cc (89.2 cu in)	110 PS (81 kW; 108 bhp)	260 N⋅m (192 ft⋅lb_{f})	11.9 s	99 g/km
1.6 dCi 4X2	2013–present	1,598 cc (97.5 cu in)	130 PS (96 kW; 128 bhp)	320 N⋅m (236 ft⋅lb_{f})	9.9 s	115 g/km
1.6 dCi 4X2 XTRONIC	2013–present	1,598 cc (97.5 cu in)	130 PS (96 kW; 128 bhp)	320 N⋅m (236 ft⋅lb_{f})	11.1 s	119 g/km
1.6 dCi All Mode 4X4-i	2013–present	1,598 cc (97.5 cu in)	130 PS (96 kW; 128 bhp)	320 N⋅m (236 ft⋅lb_{f})	10.5 s	129 g/km
1.7 dCi All Mode 4X4-i	2019–2020	1,749 cc (106.7 cu in)	150 PS (110 kW; 148 bhp)	340 N⋅m (251 ft⋅lb_{f})	11.2 s	

=== Safety ===
Euro NCAP test results* Nissan Qashqai 1.5 dCi Acenta (LHD) (2014)
Test	Points	%
Overall:	5 /5 stars	
Adult occupant:	33.8	88%
Child occupant:	40.8	83%
Pedestrian:	24.9	69%
Safety assist:	10.3	79%

IIHS scores (US model year 2017)
Small overlap front (driver)	Good
Moderate overlap front (original test)	Good
Side (original test)	Good

ANCAP test results* Nassin Qashqai (2014)
Test	Score
Overall	5 /5 stars
Frontal offset	15.56/16
Side impact	16/16
Pole	2/2
Seat belt reminders	3/3
Whiplash protection	Good
Pedestrian protection	Adequate
Electronic stability control	Standard

ANCAP test results* Nassin Qashqai (2017)
Test	Score
Overall	5 /5 stars
Frontal offset	15.56/16
Side impact	16/16
Pole	2/2
Seat belt reminders	3/3
Whiplash protection	Good
Pedestrian protection	Adequate
Electronic stability control	Standard

== Third generation (J12; 2021) ==
Third generation
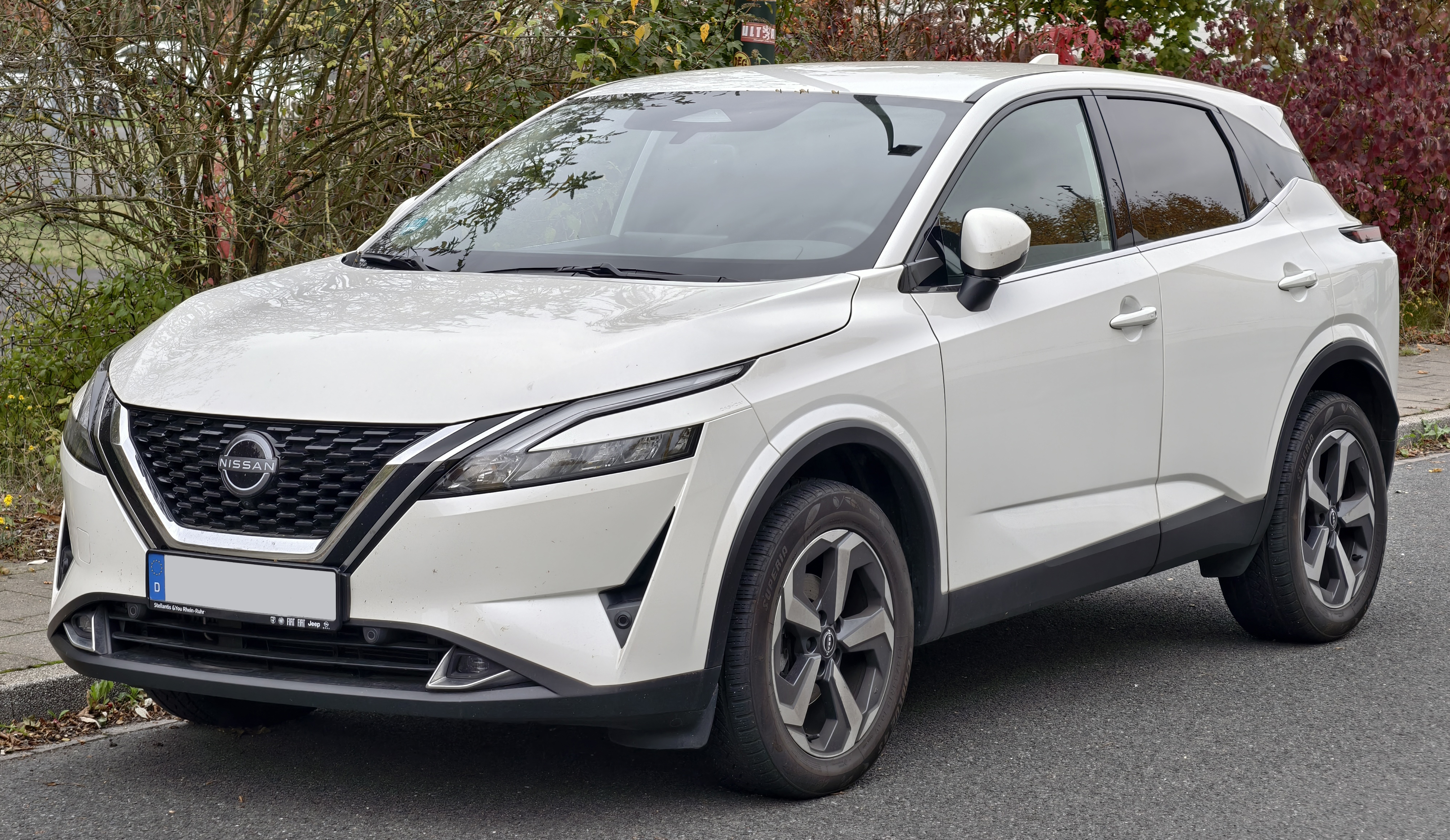
- Nissan Qashqai (pre-facelift)

Overview
- Model code: J12
- Production: 2021–present (UK); May 2023 – 2026 (China)
- Assembly: United Kingdom: Sunderland (NMUK); China: Dalian (Dongfeng Nissan)

Body and chassis
- Platform: Renault–Nissan CMF-CD platform
- Related: Nissan Rogue/X-Trail (T33); Renault Austral

Powertrain
- Engine: Petrol: 1.3 L HR13DDT DIG-T I4; Petrol hybrid: 1.5 L KH5T turbo I3; 1.5 L ZR15DDTe turbo I3
- Electric motor: 12V electric motor/generator micro-hybridization solution (μHEV); AC3 synchronous (e-Power)
- Power output: 103 kW (138 hp; 140 PS) and 117 kW (157 hp; 159 PS) (HR13DDT); 117 kW (157 hp; 159 PS) (KH5T e-Power)
- Transmission: 6-speed manual; CVT-Xtronic; Single speed constant ratio (e-Power)
- Hybrid drivetrain: Mild hybrid (1.3L 12V ALiS); Series hybrid (e-Power)
- Battery: 12-volt advanced lithium-ion battery system (ALiS); 2 kWh Panasonic lithium-ion (e-Power)

Dimensions
- Wheelbase: 2,666 mm (105.0 in)
- Length: 4,425 mm (174.2 in)
- Width: 1,838 mm (72.4 in)
- Height: 1,635 mm (64.4 in)

=== Nissan IMq concept ===
The Nissan IMq concept was showcased on 5 March 2019, which was previewed the third-generation Qashqai.

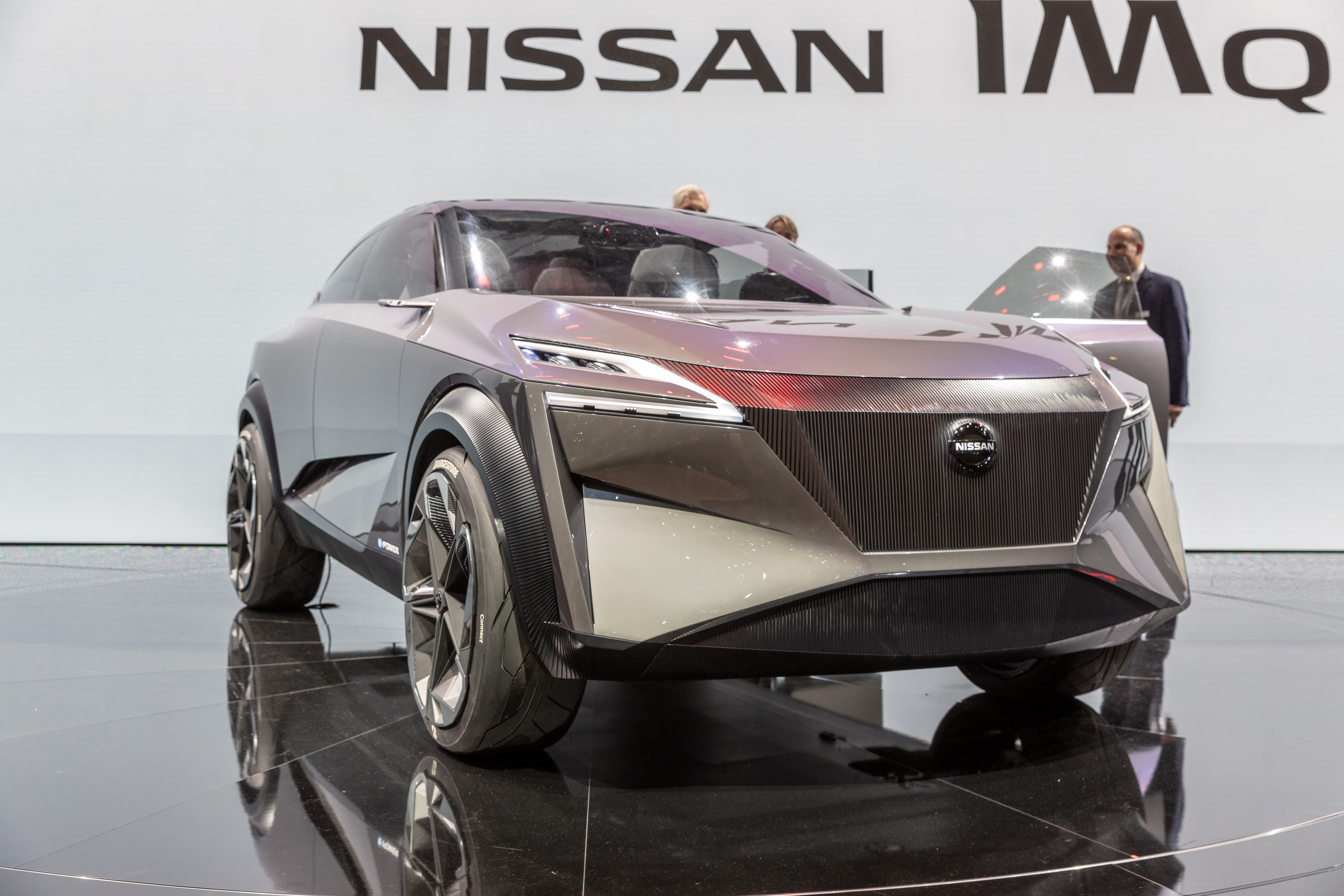
Nissan IMq concept

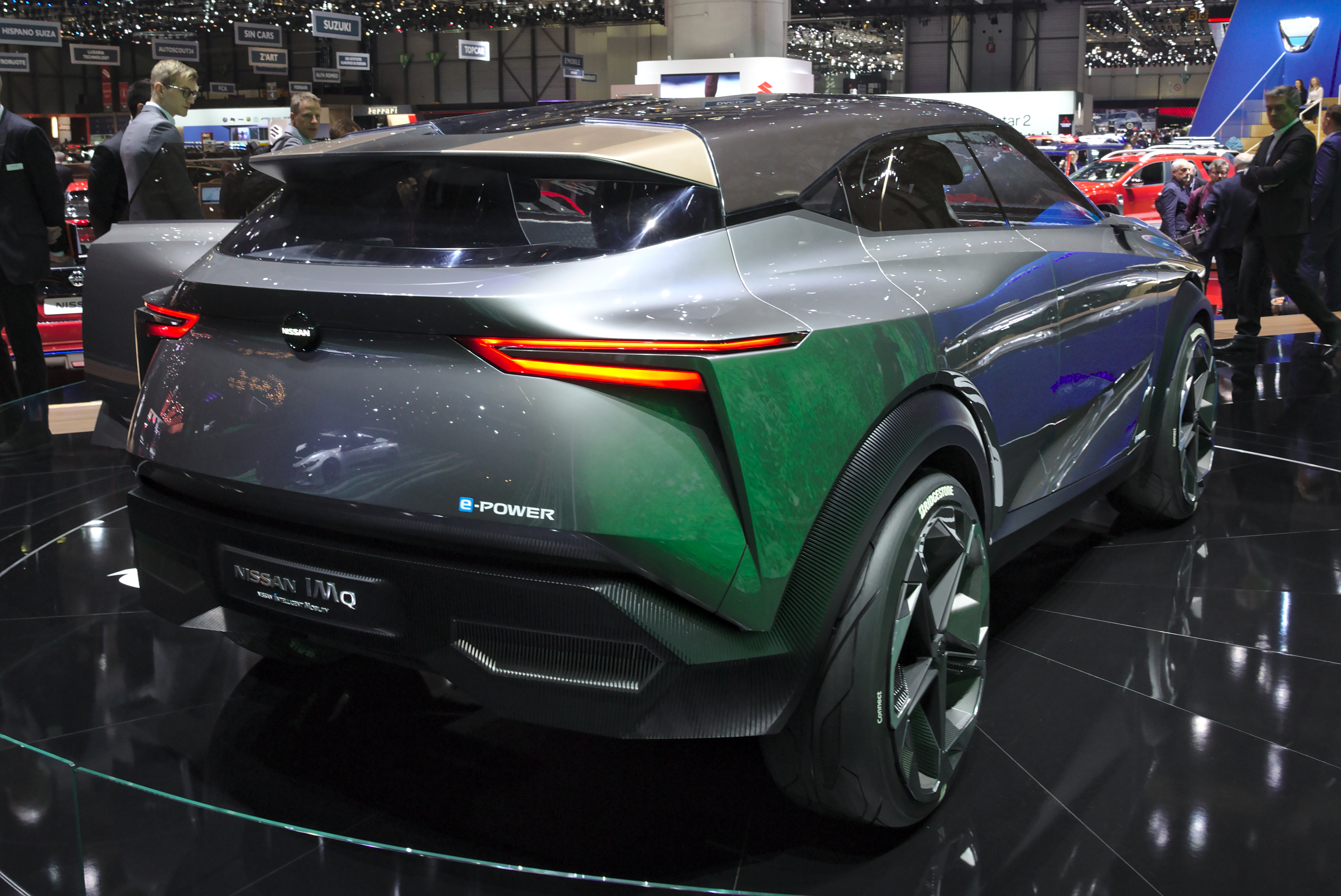
Rear view

=== Overview ===
The third-generation Qashqai was announced and released on 18 February 2021. The vehicle is slightly larger than before, being 35 mm (1.4 in) longer, 32 mm (1.3 in) wider and 25 mm (1.0 in) taller, while its wheelbase is 20 mm (0.8 in) longer, and is based on the CMF-CD platform shared with the Nissan Rogue/X-Trail (T33) and Renault Austral. Since this generation, Nissan has stopped the use of the Rogue Sport name in the United States due to the discontinuation of the second-generation there, reverting to Qashqai globally.

It is claimed to use more lightweight materials and advanced stamping and welding techniques in its construction to increase strength and reduce weight. The bonnet, front fenders and doors are made of aluminium and are 21 kg (46 lb) lighter, while the tailgate is made from composites and saves 2.3 kg (5.1 lb).

For better visibility, Nissan engineered a thinner A-pillar design and the mounting of the wing mirrors on the doors instead of the A-pillar. Rear knee room for passengers has grown by 28 mm (1.1 in) to 608 mm (23.9 in), while headroom has increased by 15 mm (0.6 in). The boot is also 50 litres larger due to the lower cargo floor and redesigned suspension.

The base engine option is the mild hybrid 1.3-litre four-cylinder DIG-T turbocharged petrol engine which makes 138 hp (140 PS; 103 kW) at 5500 rpm with 220 N⋅m (162 lbf⋅ft) at 1500–3500 rpm and 157 hp (159 PS; 117 kW) with 270 N⋅m (199 lbf⋅ft) at 1800–3500 rpm. It is paired to either a 6-speed manual or an Xtronic CVT-X transmission. All-wheel-drive is available for the 156 hp option with CVT.

For the first time, the Qashqai range also includes the e-Power hybrid powertrain. The system uses the ICE engine as a generator of electricity and is not connected to the driven wheels. The system combines a 154 hp (156 PS; 115 kW) 1.5-litre variable-compression petrol engine with a 187 hp (190 PS; 139 kW) electric motor, a power generator, and an inverter, making it a series hybrid with no plug-in capability.

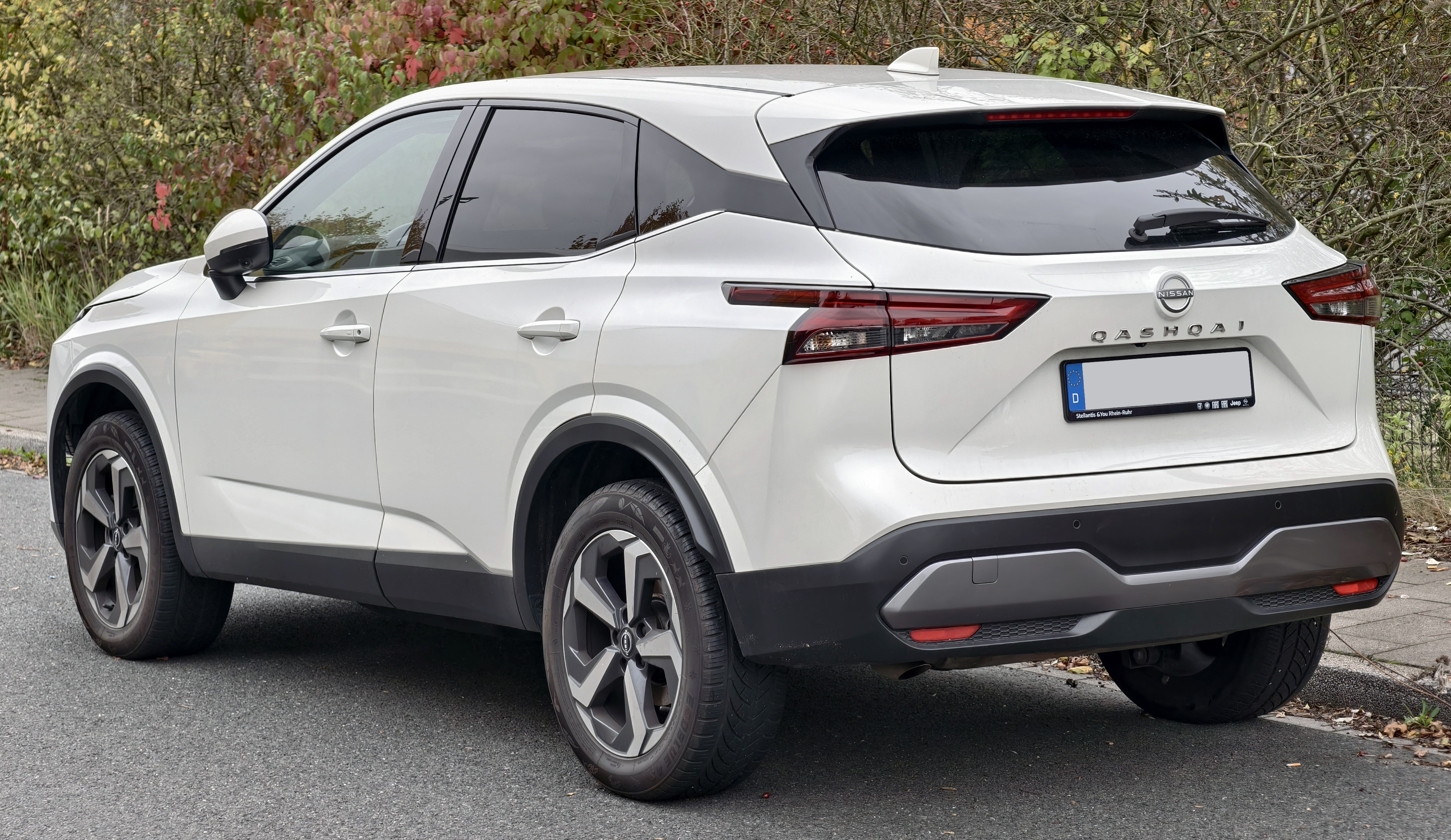
Rear view

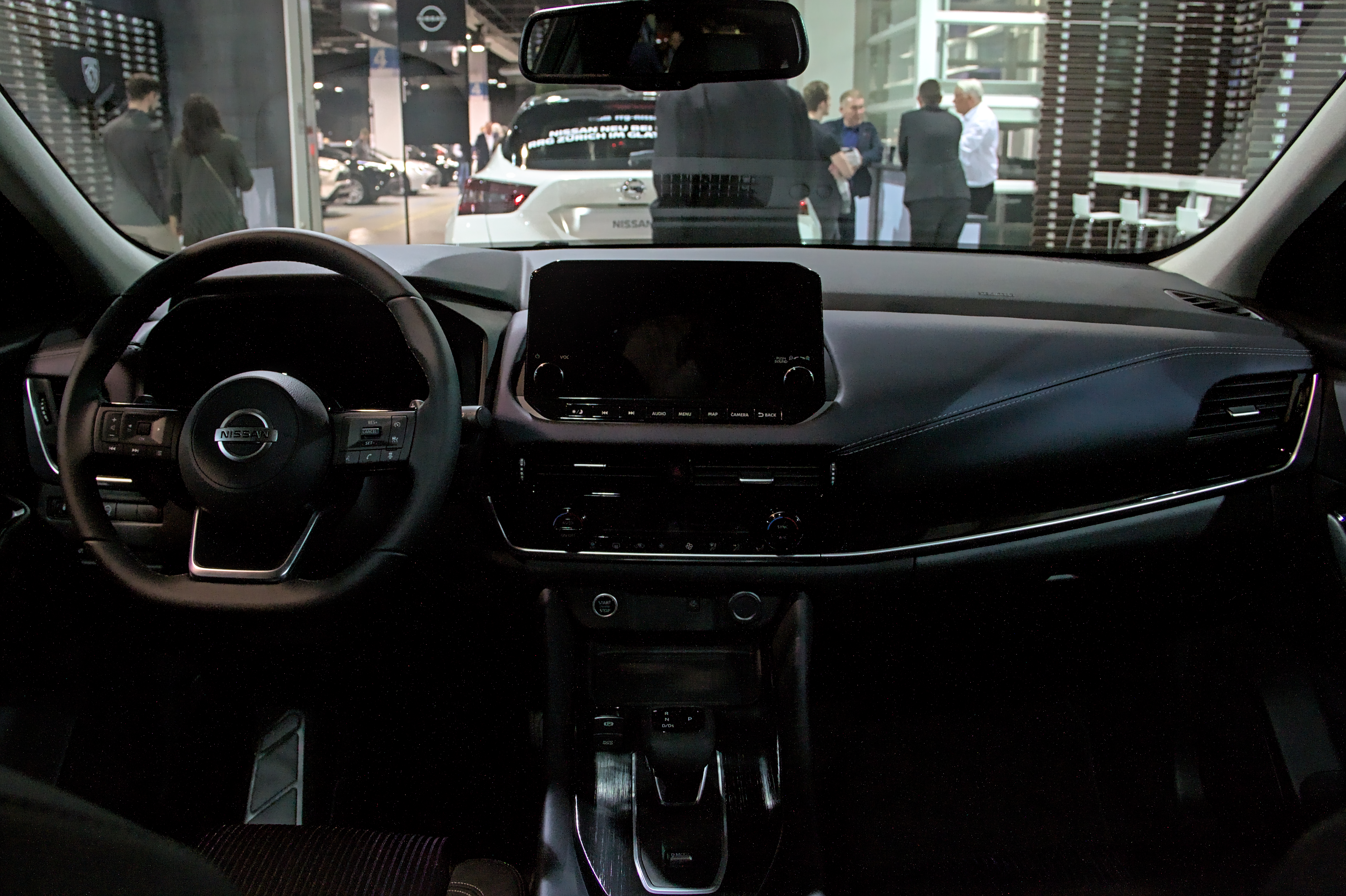
Interior

=== Facelift ===
The facelifted Qashqai was revealed on 17 April 2024. Changes include redesigned headlights and taillights, a new front fascia inspired from the Ariya, new exterior colours can be optioned with satin chrome or gloss black elements, new alloy wheel designs, new seat designs, new interior materials, the infotainment system uses Google built-in services, an updated Around View Monitor feature with a front camera viewing angle of 200-degrees, and a new Driver Assist Custom Mode feature allows drivers to preference certain safety features. There is a new N-Design grade for the facelifted range.

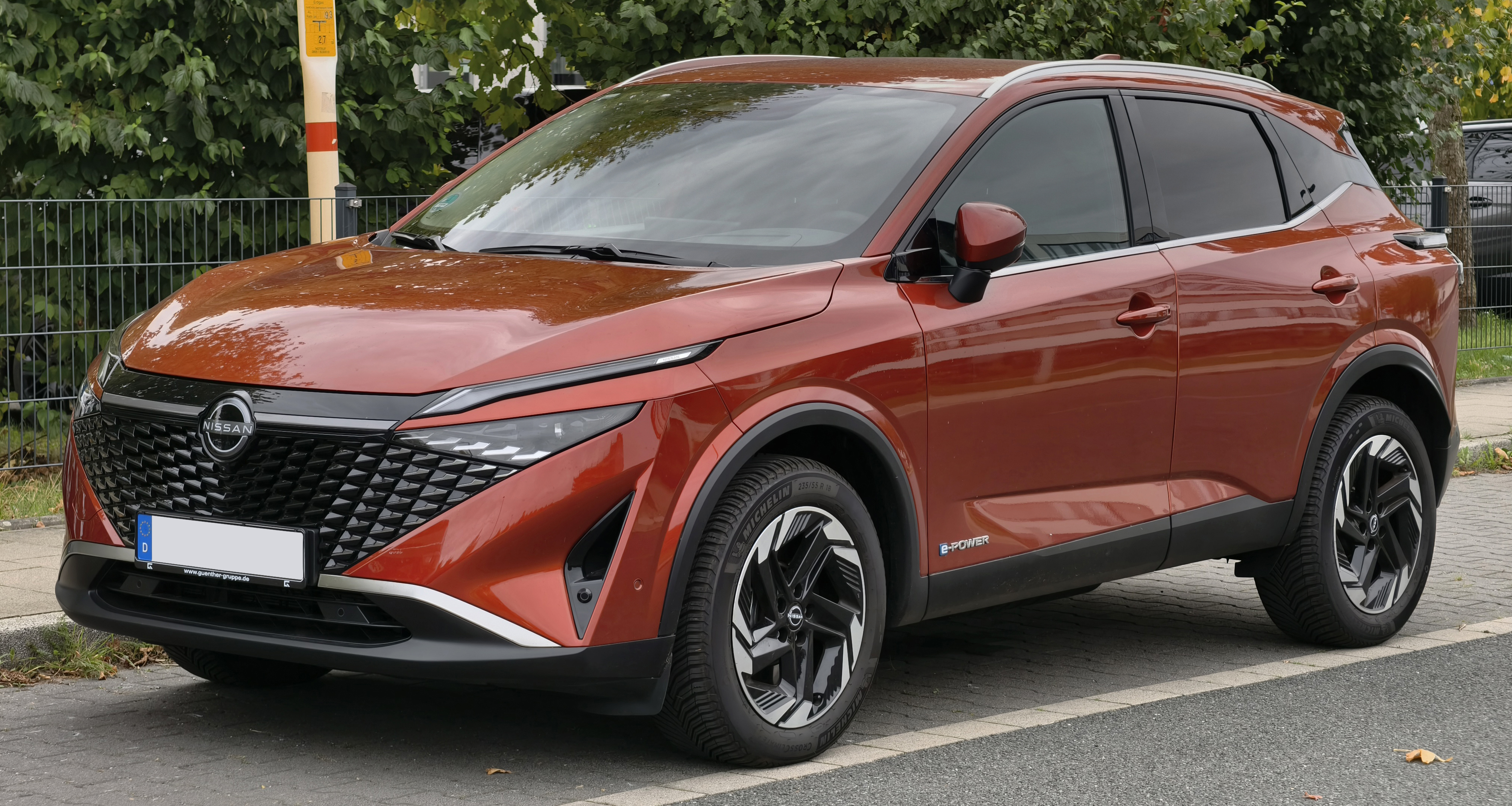
Nissan Qashqai e-Power (facelift)

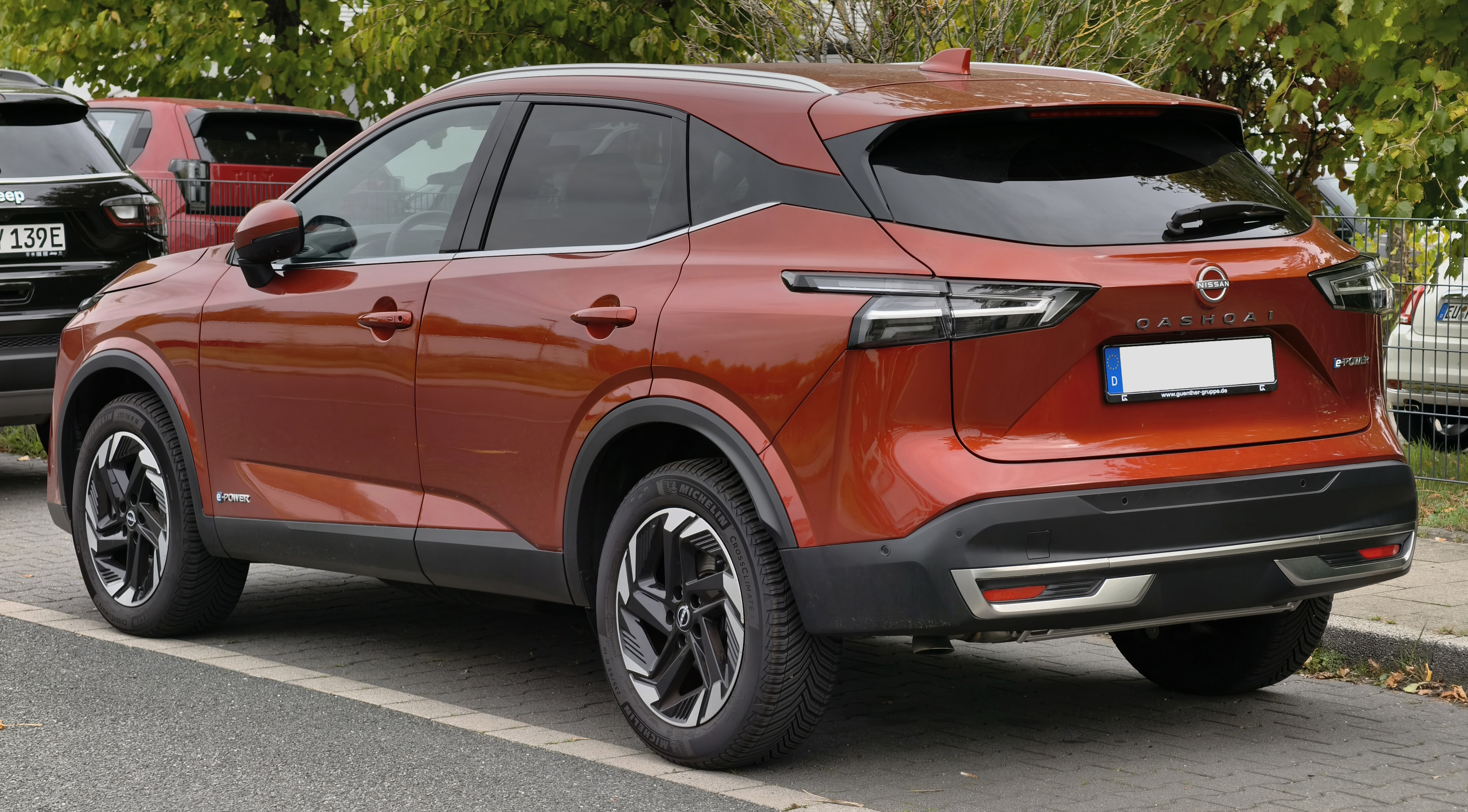
Nissan Qashqai e-Power (facelift)

Interior (facelift)

=== Safety ===
The UK-built Qashqai in its most basic Latin American market configuration with 6 airbags, airbag switch, load limiters, UN127, ESC, ISA, and full SBR received 5 stars from Latin NCAP 3.0 in 2022 under its new protocol (similar to Euro NCAP 2014).

Latin NCAP 3.0 test results Nissan Qashqai + 6 Airbags (2022, similar to Euro NCAP 2014)
Test	Points	%
Overall:	5 /5 stars	
Adult occupant:	37.46	94%
Child occupant:	45.09	92%
Pedestrian:	25.75	54%
Safety assist:	36.95	86%

Euro NCAP test results Nissan Qashqai 1.3 petrol 4x2 Acenta (LHD) (2021)
Test	Points	%
Overall:	5 /5 stars	
Adult occupant:	34.8	91%
Child occupant:	44.8	91%
Pedestrian:	38.2	70%
Safety assist:	15.2	95%

Euro NCAP test results Nissan Qashqai 1.5 N-Connecta (LHD) (2025)
Test	Points	%
Overall:	4 /5 stars	
Adult occupant:	31.4	78%
Child occupant:	41.8	85%
Pedestrian:	41.3	65%
Safety assist:	11.3	62%

ANCAP test results Nissan Qashqai (2021, aligned with Euro NCAP)
Test	Points	%
Overall:	5 /5 stars	
Adult occupant:	34.84	91%
Child occupant:	45.78	93%
Pedestrian:	40.17	74%
Safety assist:	15.56	97%

ANCAP test results Nissan Qashqai (2025, aligned with Euro NCAP)
Test	Points	%
Overall:	4 /5 stars	
Adult occupant:	31.39	78%
Child occupant:	44.78	91%
Pedestrian:	43.29	68%
Safety assist:	11.33	62%

== Sales ==
Year	Europe (Note: Europe: 2020 EU 27 + UK + Switzerland + Norway + Iceland)	Turkey	Canada	China
2006	54	~45,000		
2007	89,919	~45,000		
2008	144,879	~45,000		23,772
2009	180,468	~45,000		33,877
2010	207,077	~45,000		62,075
2011	208,649	~45,000		111,304
2012	207,515	~45,000		105,143
2013	201,722	~45,000		124,589
2014	202,914	~100,000		87,448
2015	230,661	~100,000		60,072
2016	233,496	~100,000		139,684
2017	247,199	~100,000	8,970	156,322
2018	229,382	~100,000	19,662	175,045
2019	218,946	~100,000	18,526	179,773
2020	135,829	~100,000	11,074	161,193
2021	113,276	7,587	11,973	156,890
2022	116,365	5,449	10,631	150,621
2023		16,993		113,559
2024	166,800	19,132		112,050
2025		20,694		77,259

Nissan does not provide exact sales figures for the Rogue Sport in the US, instead grouping them together with the Rogue.
