= Nissan Korea =

2004–2020 company in South Korea

Nissan Korea Co., Ltd.
- Company type: Subsidiary
- Industry: Automotive
- Founded: 2004
- Defunct: 2020
- Headquarters: Seoul, South Korea
- Products: Automobiles
- Parent: Nissan
- Website: www.nissan.co.kr

Nissan Korea Co., Ltd. was the South Korean arm of Japanese automaker Nissan that specialized in the sales and distribution of Nissan and Infiniti automobiles in South Korea.

== History ==
Nissan Korea was established in February 2004. Considering the market situation and customer preferences, in July 2005, the Infiniti brand was launched in South Korea and car sales started. After that, Nissan Korea decided to launch the Nissan brand in November 2008. In April 2015, Infiniti Korea Co., Ltd. was established, thus separating Infiniti brand from Nissan Korea.

In mid-2020, Nissan announced it would exit the South Korean car market. They announced that the Infiniti brand would be pulled out from South Korea as well alongside the Nissan brand by December due to worsening business environment amidst the COVID-19 pandemic in South Korea and the 2019 boycott of Japanese products in South Korea. Nissan announced that service centers will be managed to provide after-sales services such as vehicle quality assurance and parts management for eight years.
