= Renault Koleos =

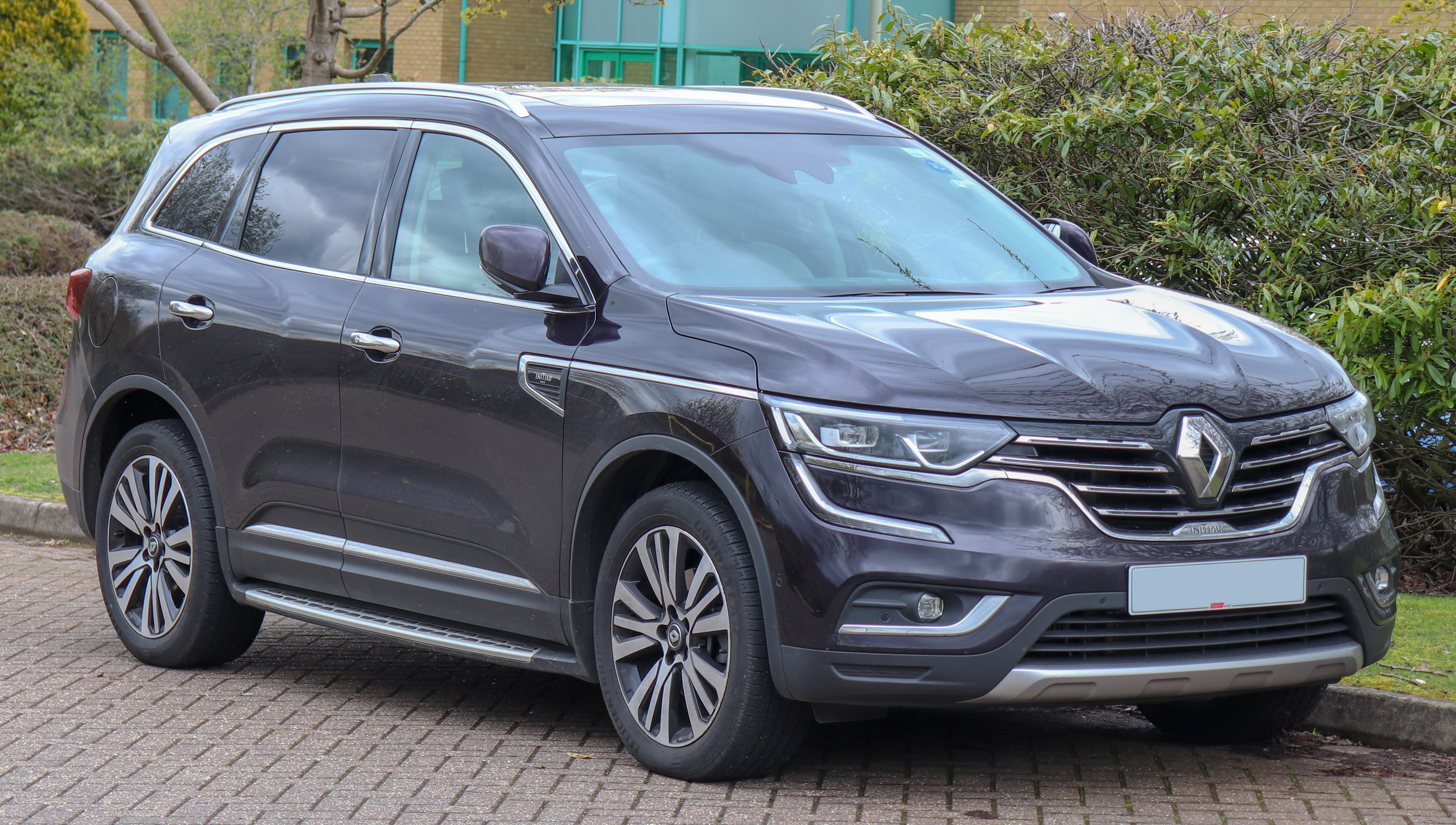

Overview
- Manufacturer: Renault
- Production: 2007–present

Body and chassis
- Class: Compact crossover SUV (2007–2017); Mid-size crossover SUV (2017–present)
- Body style: 5-door SUV
- Layout: Front-engine, front-wheel-drive; Front-engine, four-wheel-drive

Chronology
- Successor: Renault Espace VI (Europe)

The Renault Koleos, also known as Renault Samsung QM5 for the first generation and Renault QM6 in South Korea for the second generation (until 2022, it was marketed as the Renault Samsung QM6), is a five-passenger compact, later mid-size crossover SUV manufactured by the French manufacturer Renault over three generations. It is primarily manufactured in Busan, South Korea by Renault Korea (previously Renault Samsung Motors).

In South Korea, its main market, the first generation was marketed as the Renault Samsung QM5 and the second generation is marketed as the Renault Samsung QM6. The latter uses the Renault–Nissan CMF-CD modular platform shared with the Nissan X-Trail/Rogue (T32) and Renault Kadjar. The third generation is marketed as the Renault Grand Koleos and moved to the Compact Modular Architecture platform developed by Geely. It is based on the Geely Xingyue L / Monjaro.

== First generation (HY; 2007) ==
First generation
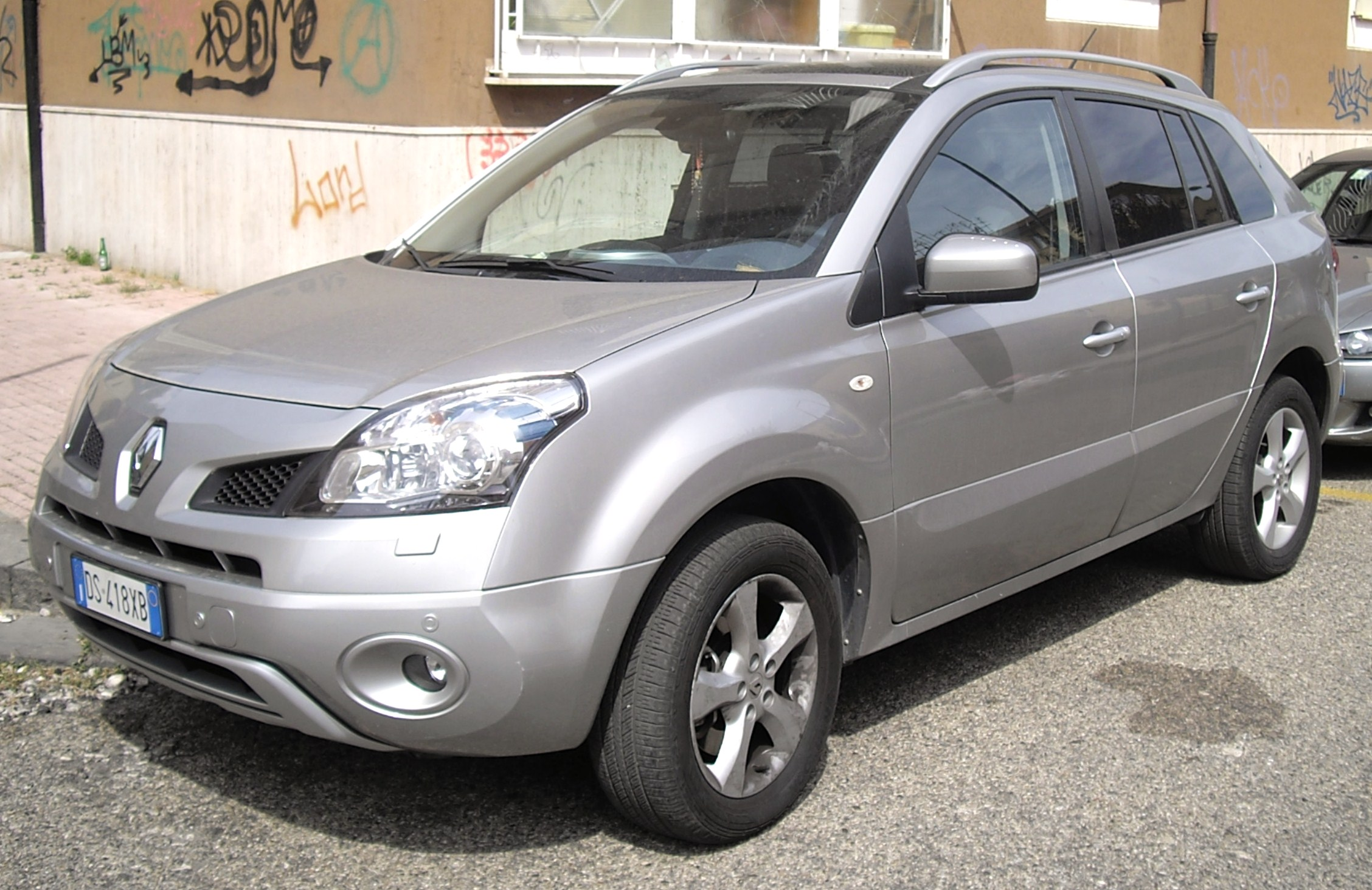

Overview
- Model code: HY
- Also called: Renault Samsung QM5 (South Korea)
- Production: 2007–2016
- Assembly: South Korea: Busan (Renault Samsung); India: Chennai (Renault Nissan India) (2010–2017); Russia: Moscow (Avtoframos) (2012–2014)
- Designer: Patrick Le Quément

Body and chassis
- Class: Compact crossover SUV
- Platform: Renault–Nissan C platform
- Related: Nissan Rogue (S35); Nissan Qashqai (J10); Nissan X-Trail (T31)

Powertrain
- Engine: Petrol: 2.0 L M4R I4 16V (China, Russia); 2.5 L Nissan QR25DE I4 16V; Diesel: 2.0 L M9R I4
- Transmission: 6-speed manual 6-speed automatic CVT

Dimensions
- Wheelbase: 2,690 mm (105.9 in)
- Length: 4,520 mm (178.0 in)
- Width: 1,855 mm (73.0 in)
- Height: 1,695 mm (66.7 in)
- Curb weight: 1,639–1,784 kg (3,613–3,933 lb)

The Koleos was an addition to the Renault compact SUV market, after selling the Scénic RX4 and the Kangoo, but it has never produced a true crossover SUV. A Koleos concept car was shown in the media as early as February 2000.

The Koleos was unveiled in 2006 as the Renault Koleos Concept at the Paris Motor Show. The production model was launched at the end of 2007 in South Korea, and in 2008 in other markets.

The Koleos' body design was based on the Renault Koleos and Renault Egeus concept cars. Some of the Koleos's competitors, such as the Citroën C-Crosser and the Peugeot 4007, were also presented by the time it was launched. ADAC of Germany awarded five stars to the Koleos, in a crash test done in August 2008.

A facelifted Koleos was unveiled in July 2011, and shown at the Frankfurt Motor Show in September 2011. In August 2010, the Koleos was withdrawn from the United Kingdom, due to poor sales of under 2,600 units. Production ended in March 2015.

=== Worldwide Marketing ===
==== South Korea ====
For the market in South Korea, the Koleos was manufactured by Renault Samsung Motors (a subsidiary of Renault) at its Busan plant in South Korea, and was sold as the Renault Samsung QM5 (H45).

==== India ====
In the market in India, Renault introduced the Koleos in September 2011. It was available with a 2.0 dCi diesel engine, with a maximum power output of 150 PS at 4000 rpm, and peak torque of 320 Nm at 2000 rpm.

=== Safety ===
ANCAP test results Renault Koleos (2008)
Test	Score
Overall	5 /5 stars
Frontal offset	13.12/16
Side impact	15.96/16
Pole	2/2
Seat belt reminders	2/3
Whiplash protection	Not Assessed
Pedestrian protection	Marginal
Electronic stability control	Standard

=== Engines ===
The range of engines:

Engine	Displacement	Power	Top speed	0–100 km/h (0-62 mph)
2.0 L 16V	1997 cc	103 kW (140 PS; 138 bhp)	174 km/h (108 mph)	9.5 s
2.5 L 16V	2488 cc	126 kW (171 PS; 169 bhp)	180 km/h (112 mph)	9.3 s
2.0 L dCi	1998 cc	110 kW (150 PS; 148 bhp)	190 km/h (118 mph)	10.4 s
2.0 L dCi	1998 cc	129 kW (175 PS; 173 bhp)	200 km/h (124 mph)	9.8 s

=== Gallery ===
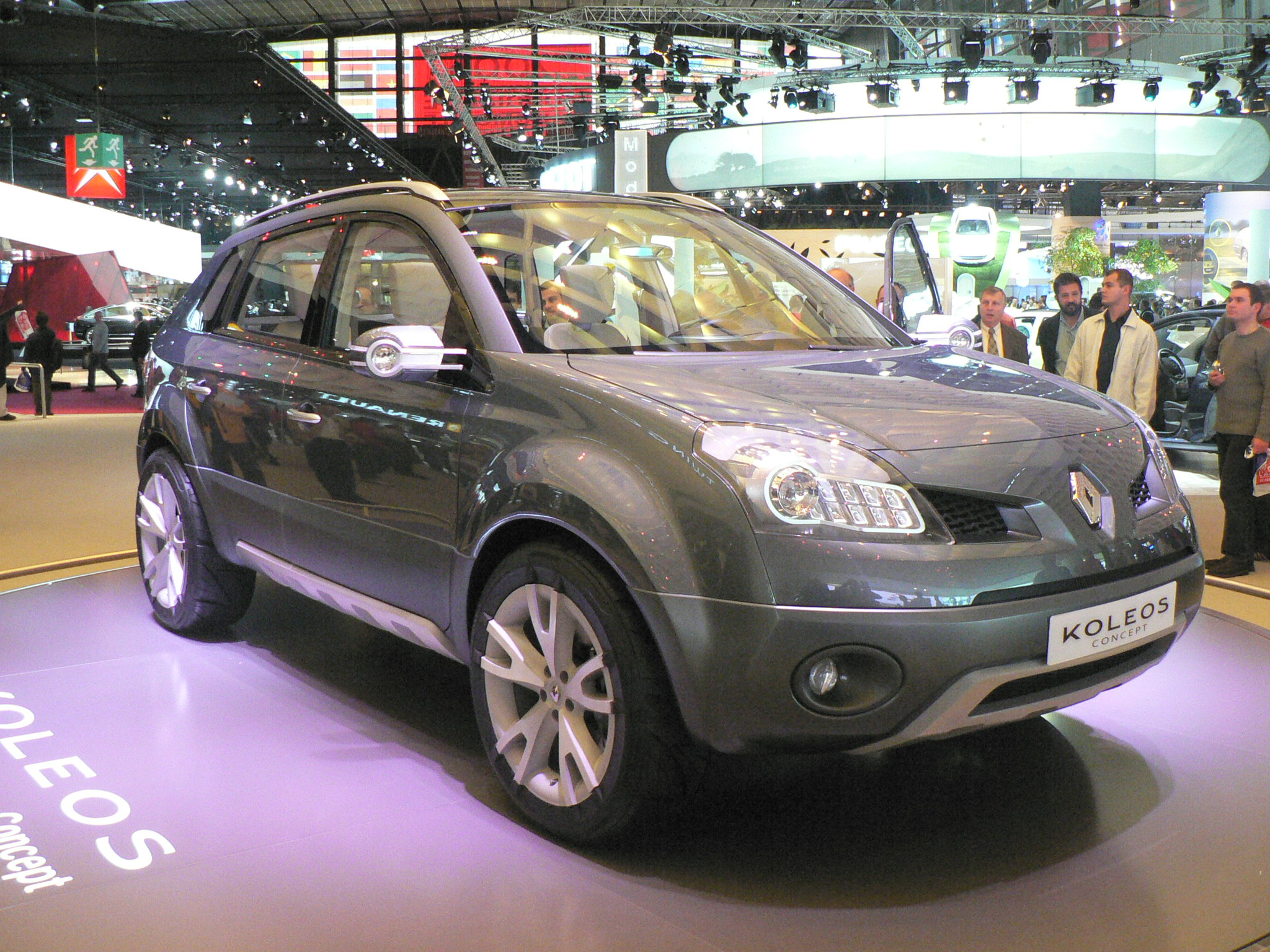
Renault Koleos Concept

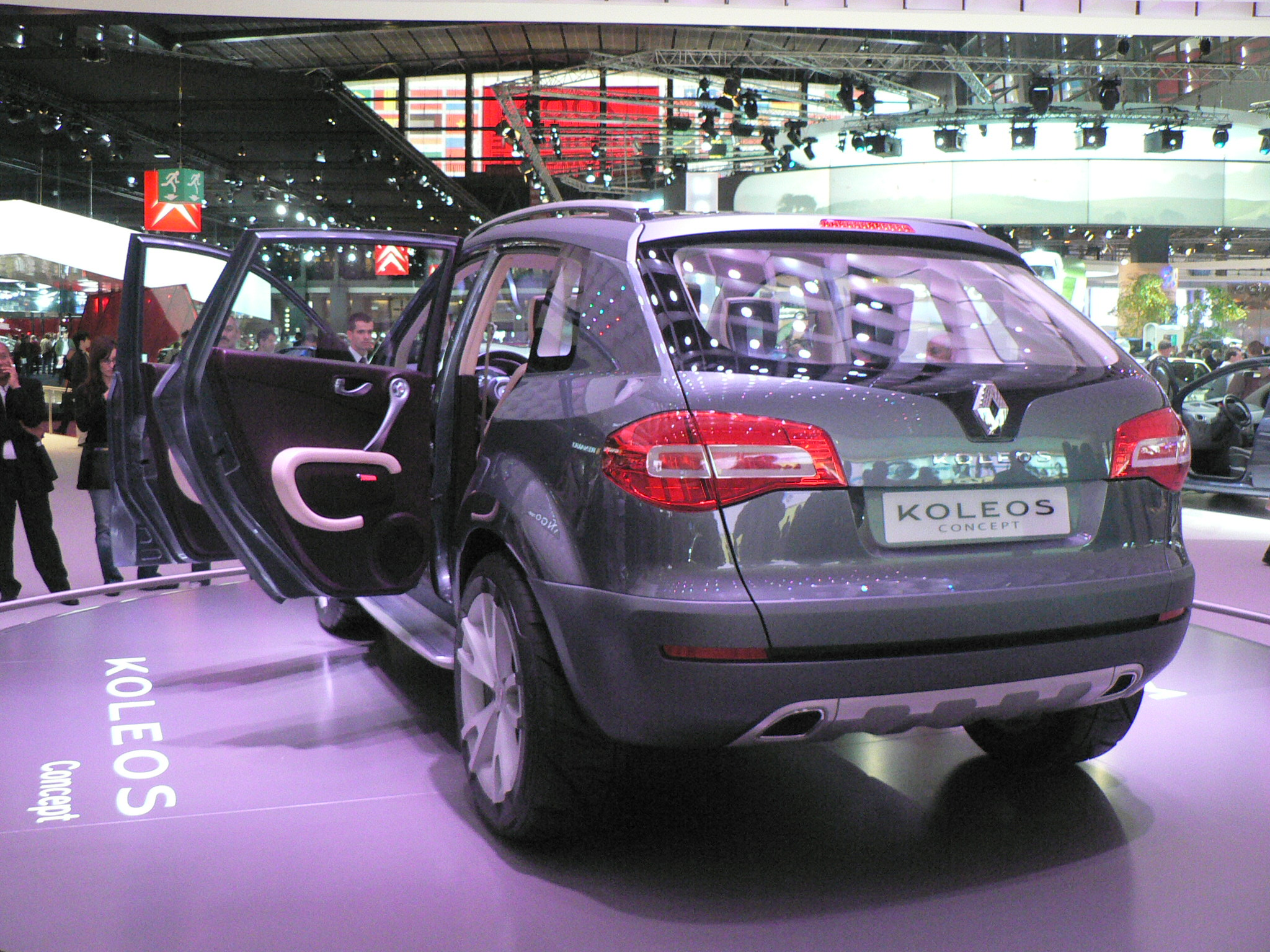
Renault Koleos Concept

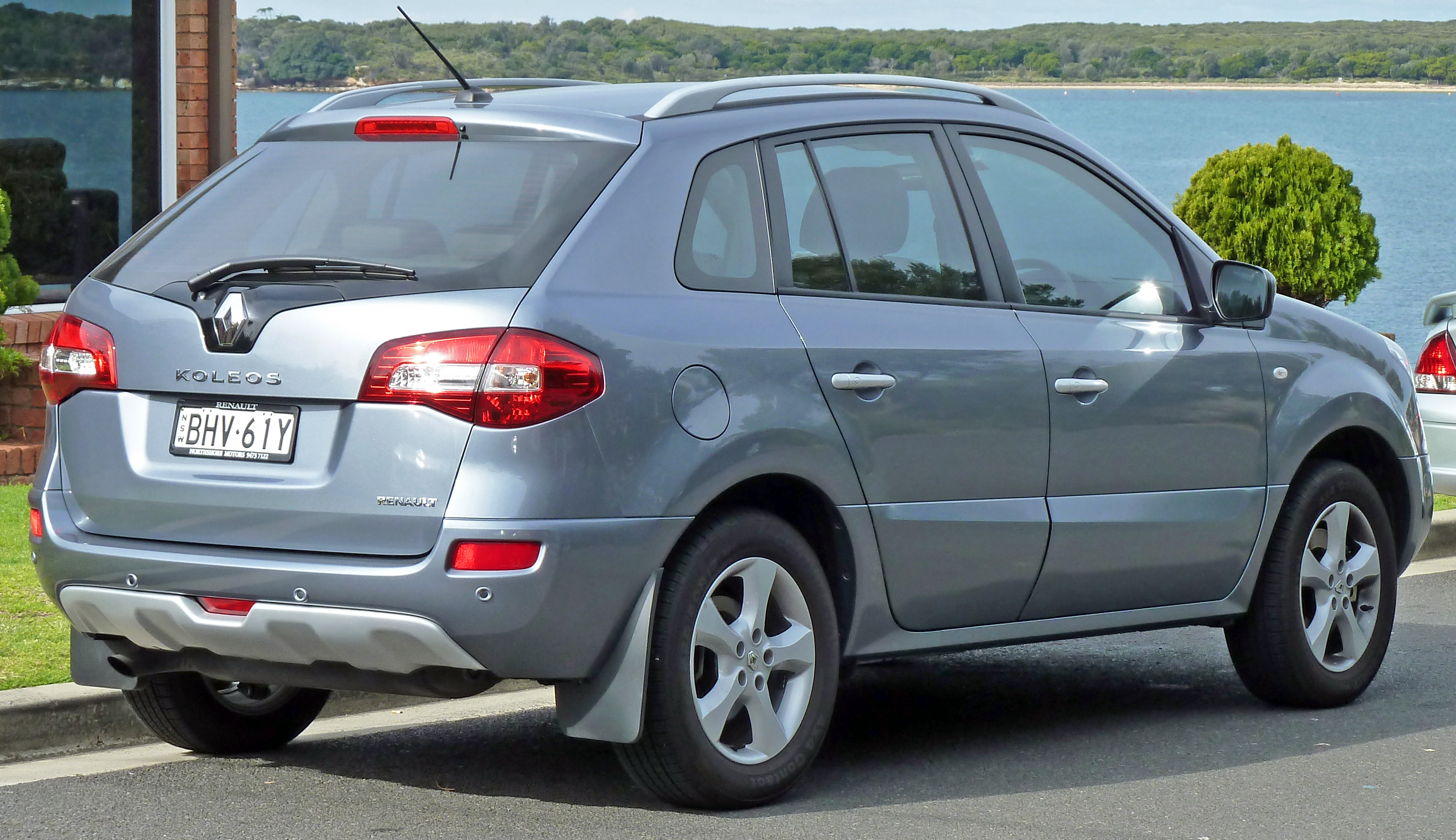
Renault Koleos (pre-facelift)

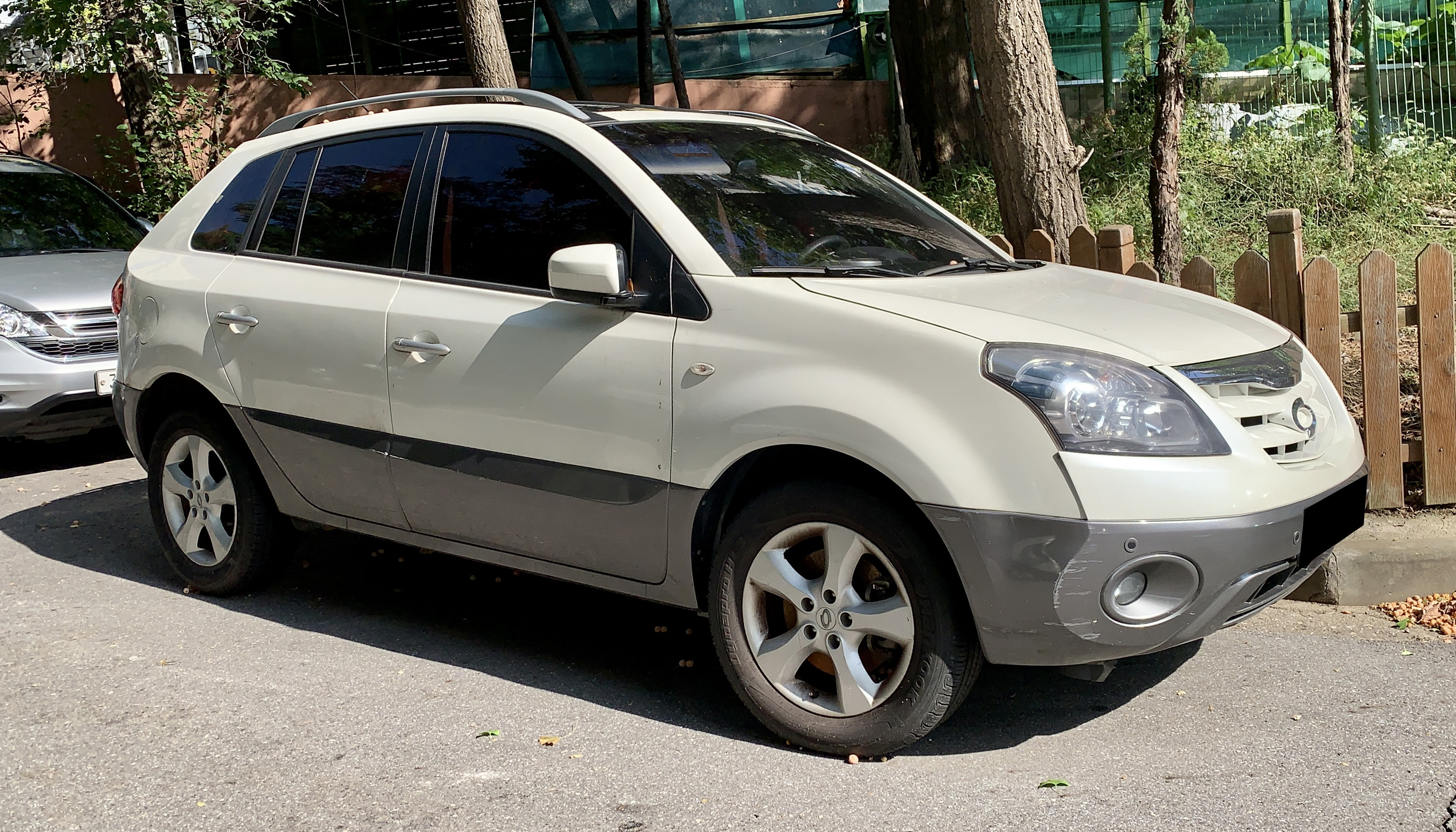
Renault Samsung QM5 (pre-facelift)

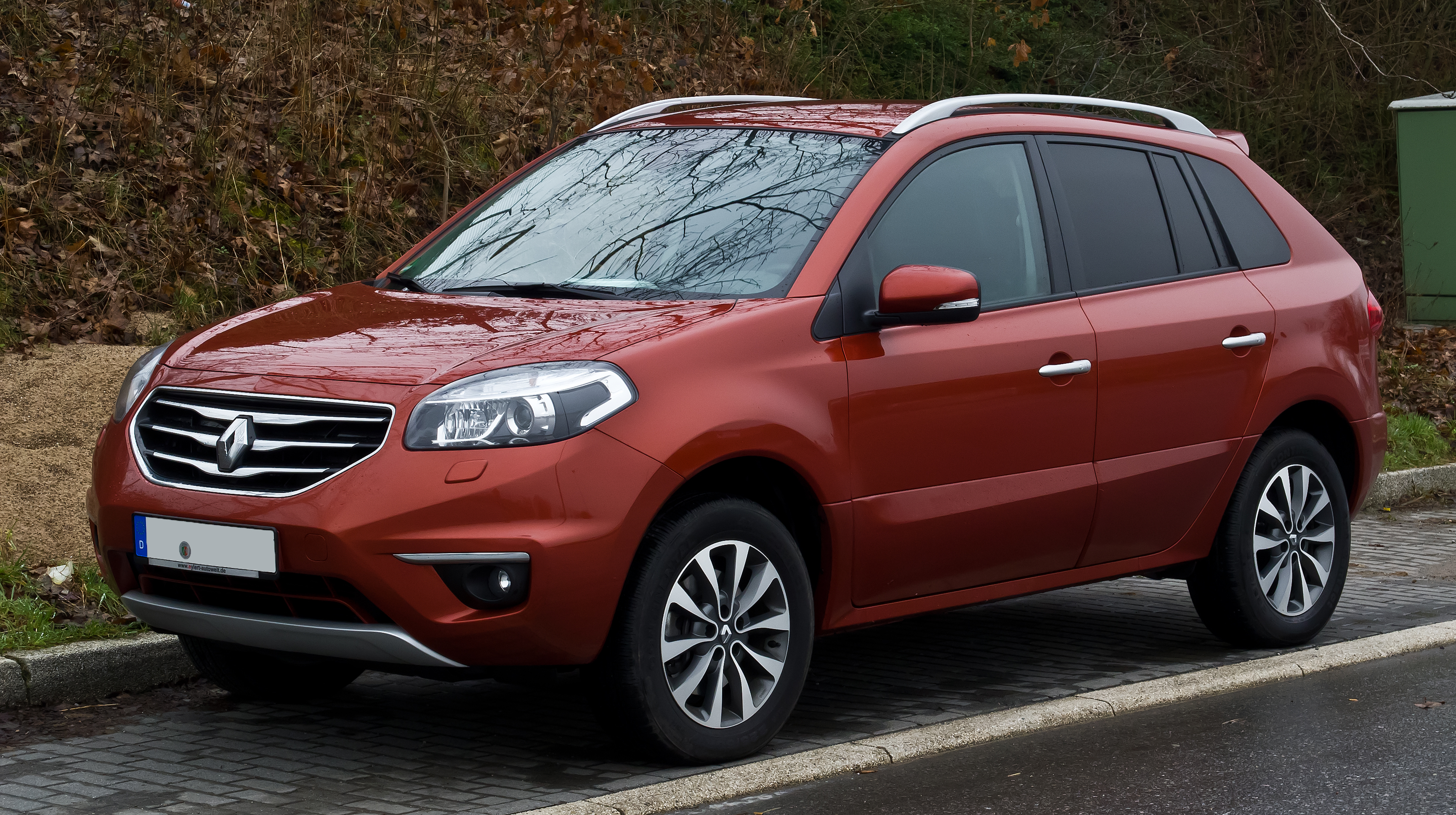
Renault Koleos (facelift)

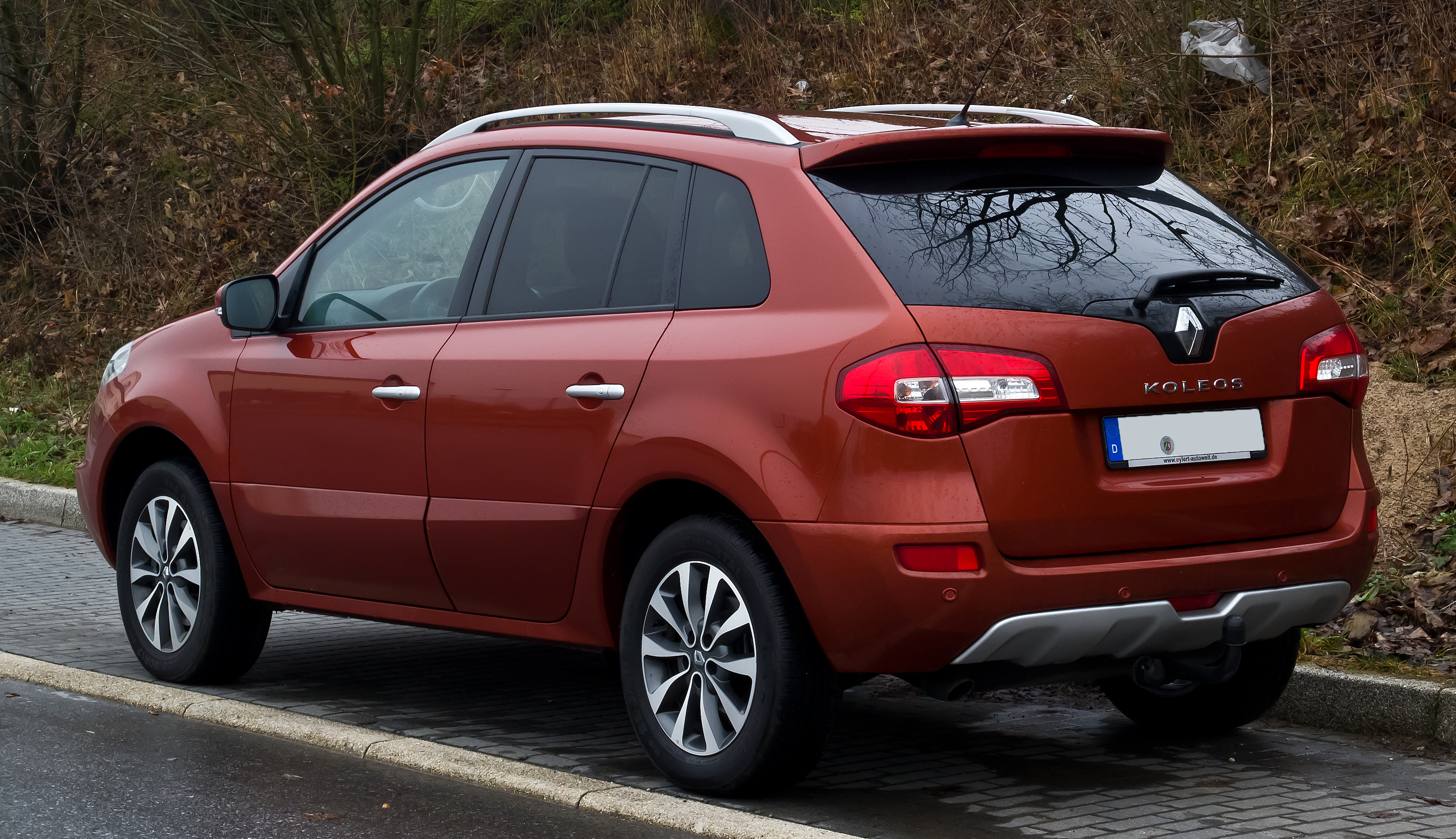
Renault Koleos (facelift)

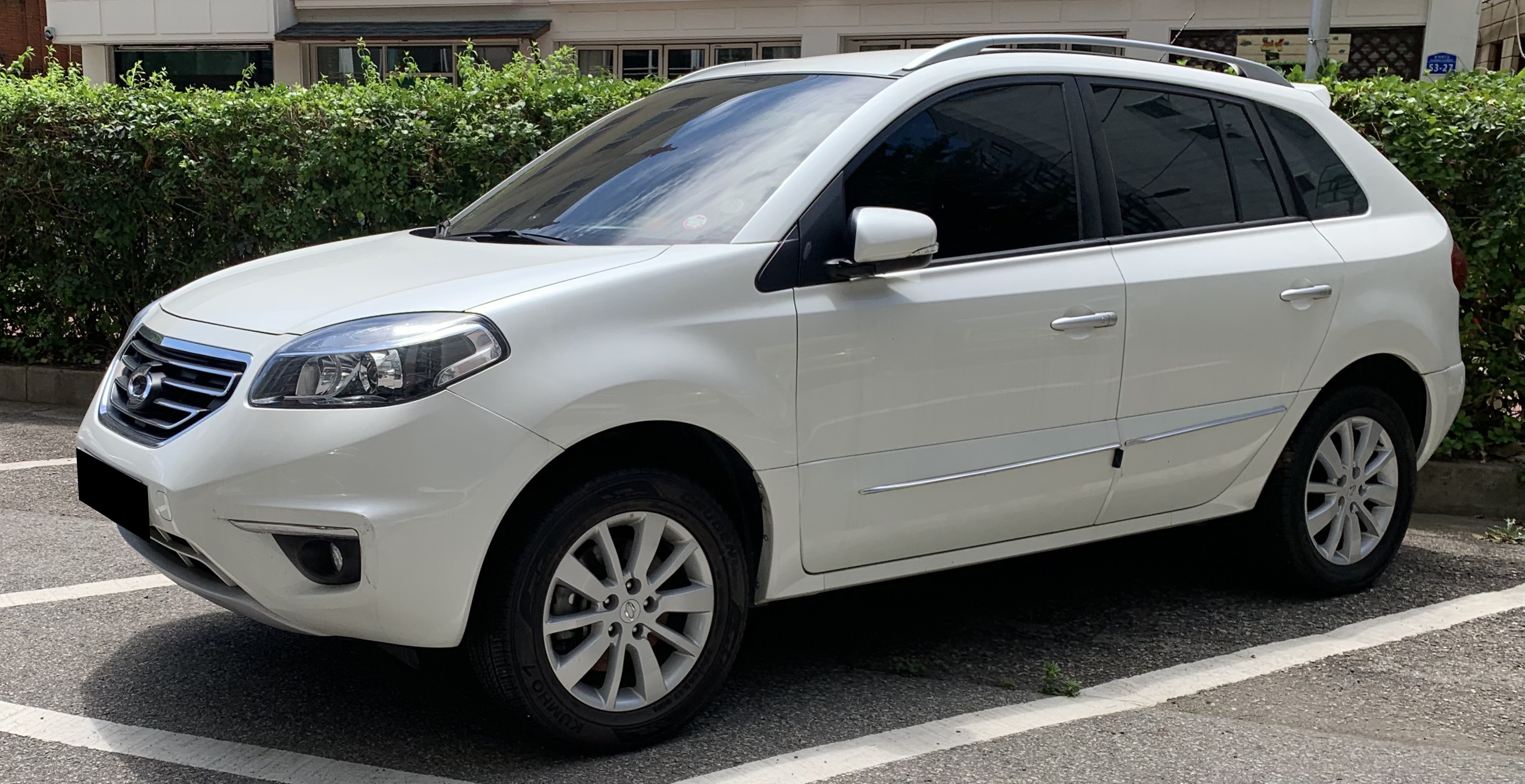
Renault Samsung QM5 (facelift)

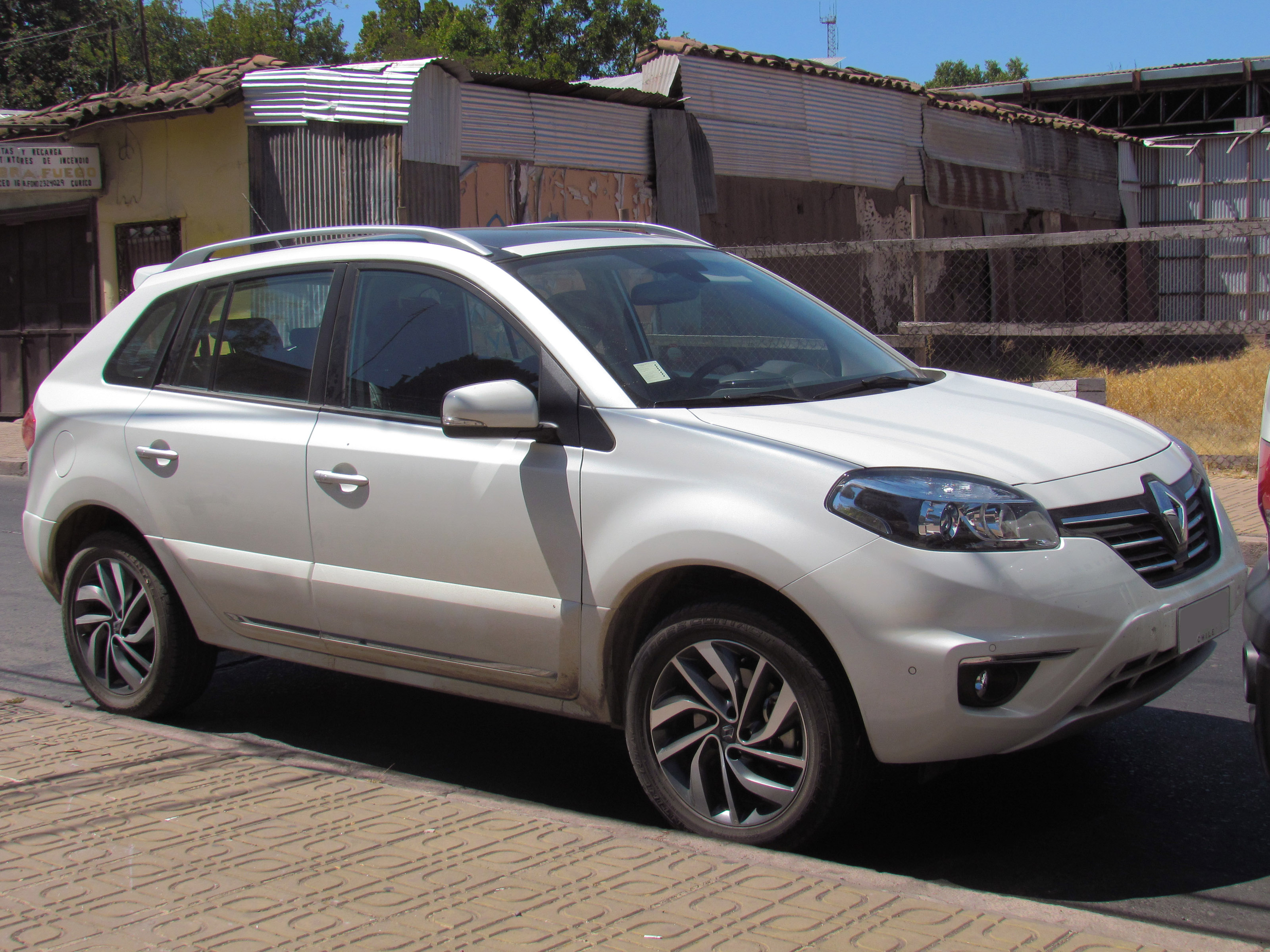
Renault Koleos (second facelift)

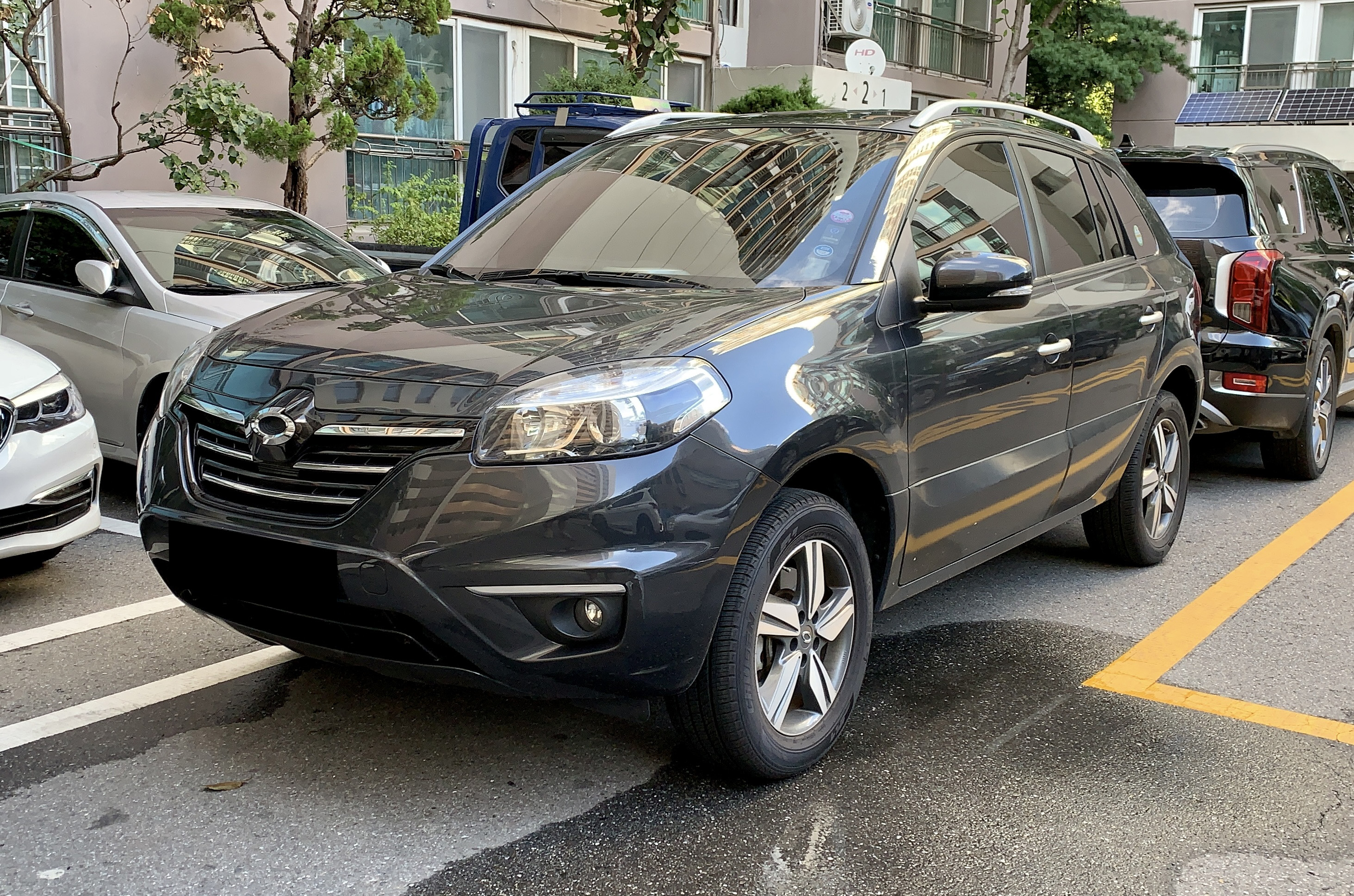
Renault Samsung QM5 (second facelift)

== Second generation (HC; 2016) ==
Second generation
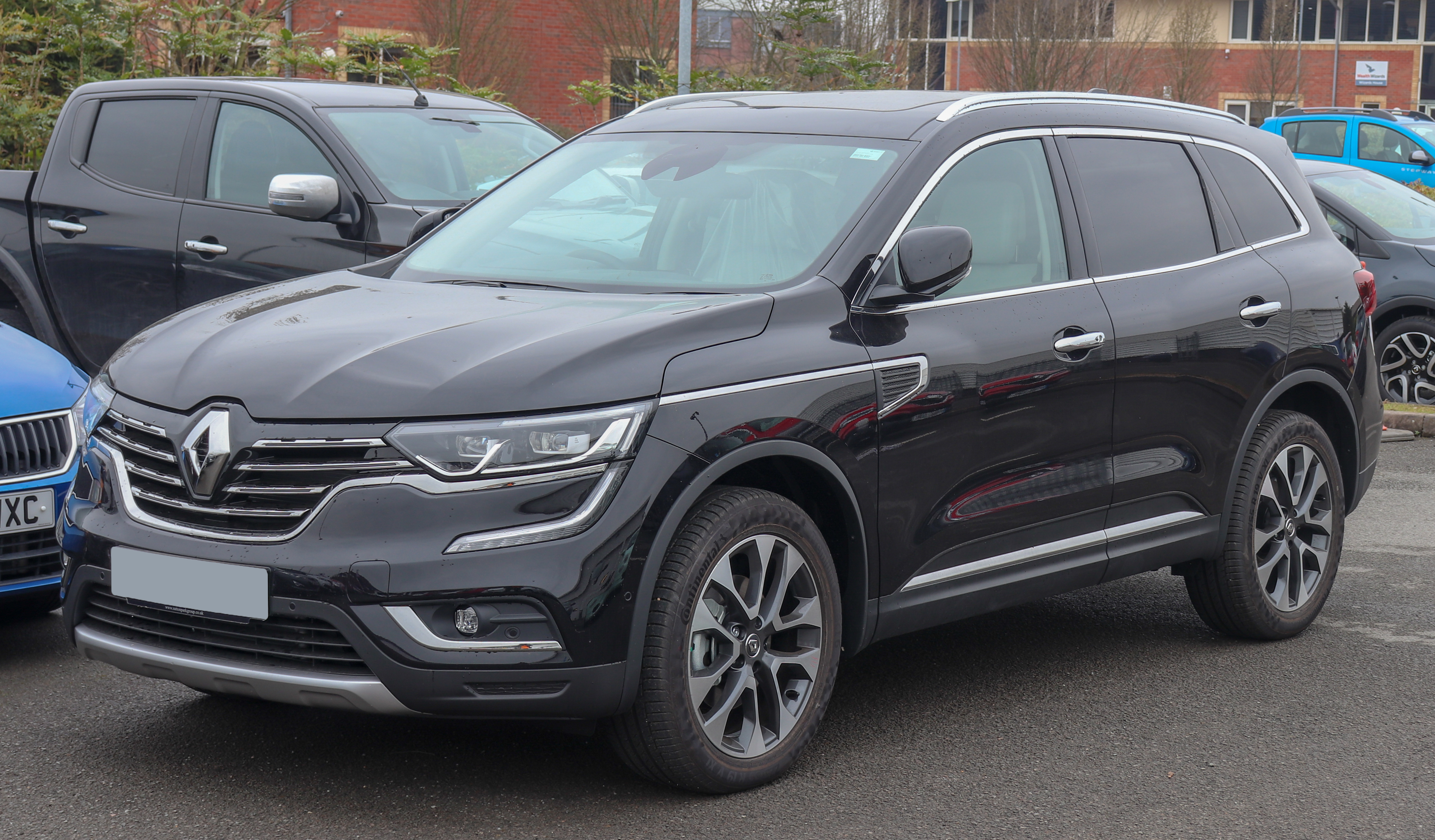

Overview
- Model code: HC
- Also called: Renault Samsung QM6 (South Korea, 2016–2022); Renault QM6 (South Korea, 2022–2025)
- Production: 2016–2025 (Korea); 2016–2020 (China)
- Assembly: South Korea: Busan (Renault Korea); China: Wuhan (Dongfeng Renault); Iran: Salafchegan (Soroush Motor Mabna)
- Designer: Alexis Martot

Body and chassis
- Class: Mid-size crossover SUV (D)
- Platform: Renault–Nissan CMF-CD platform
- Related: Nissan X-Trail/Rogue (T32); Renault Kadjar; Renault Talisman

Powertrain
- Engine: Petrol: 1.3 L H5Ht I4 turbo; 2.0 L M5R I4; 2.5 L Nissan QR25DE I4; Diesel: 1.6 L R9M I4; 2.0 L M9R I4
- Transmission: 6-speed manual; Jatco X-TRONIC CVT8 CVT; 7-speed EDC

Dimensions
- Wheelbase: 2,705 mm (106.5 in)
- Length: 4,672 mm (183.9 in)
- Width: 1,843 mm (72.6 in)
- Height: 1,678 mm (66.1 in)
- Curb weight: 1,520–1,654 kg (3,351–3,646 lb)

A second generation of the Koleos was introduced at the 2016 Beijing Motor Show, by Renault's chief Carlos Ghosn. Despite a wide-ranging rumour that the latest Renault SUV would be called the Maxthon, the company has instead decided to reinstate the name Koleos.

The larger second-generation Koleos uses the Common Module Family (CMF-CD) modular platform developed jointly by Renault and Nissan, and already used on similar vehicles as the third-generation Nissan X-Trail and the Renault Kadjar.

In some versions, the car has three drivetrain options: two-wheel drive, four-wheel drive mode that adapts power, torque distribution between axles to improve traction, and a standard four-wheel drive. The updated Koleos has been awarded a five-star safety rating by Euro NCAP.

As standard, the car has a seven-inch touchscreen, while higher trim levels have an infotainment system with an 8.7 inch touchscreen (called R Link 2). Gearboxes are manual and automatic. The new Koleos first went on sale in Australia on 1 August 2016 and has been rolled out in most of Asia, Europe, and South America by the middle of 2017.

The facelift of 2020 arrived in Mexico in the end of October 2019. The SUV was scheduled to be shown at the 2020 Manila International Auto Show on April 2, 2020, by Renault Samsung Motors as the QM6.

It was discontinued in the United Kingdom in July 2020 due to sluggish sales, three years after it was reintroduced to the British market and ten years after the original model ended UK sales.

Outside of South Korea, it is replaced in 2023 by the sixth-generation Renault Espace. The production of the vehicle ceased in April 2023, except for the South Korean, Australian, African, South American to Mexican market where it was given a minor facelift.

In 2024, Renault Korea rebranded itself, and replaced the Eye of the Typhoon emblem with the new losange logo on the QM6. The model was from then on known as the Renault QM6 and came exclusively with the 2.0L M5R engine in either gasoline or LNG forms. In November 2025, production of the HC Renault QM6 ended.

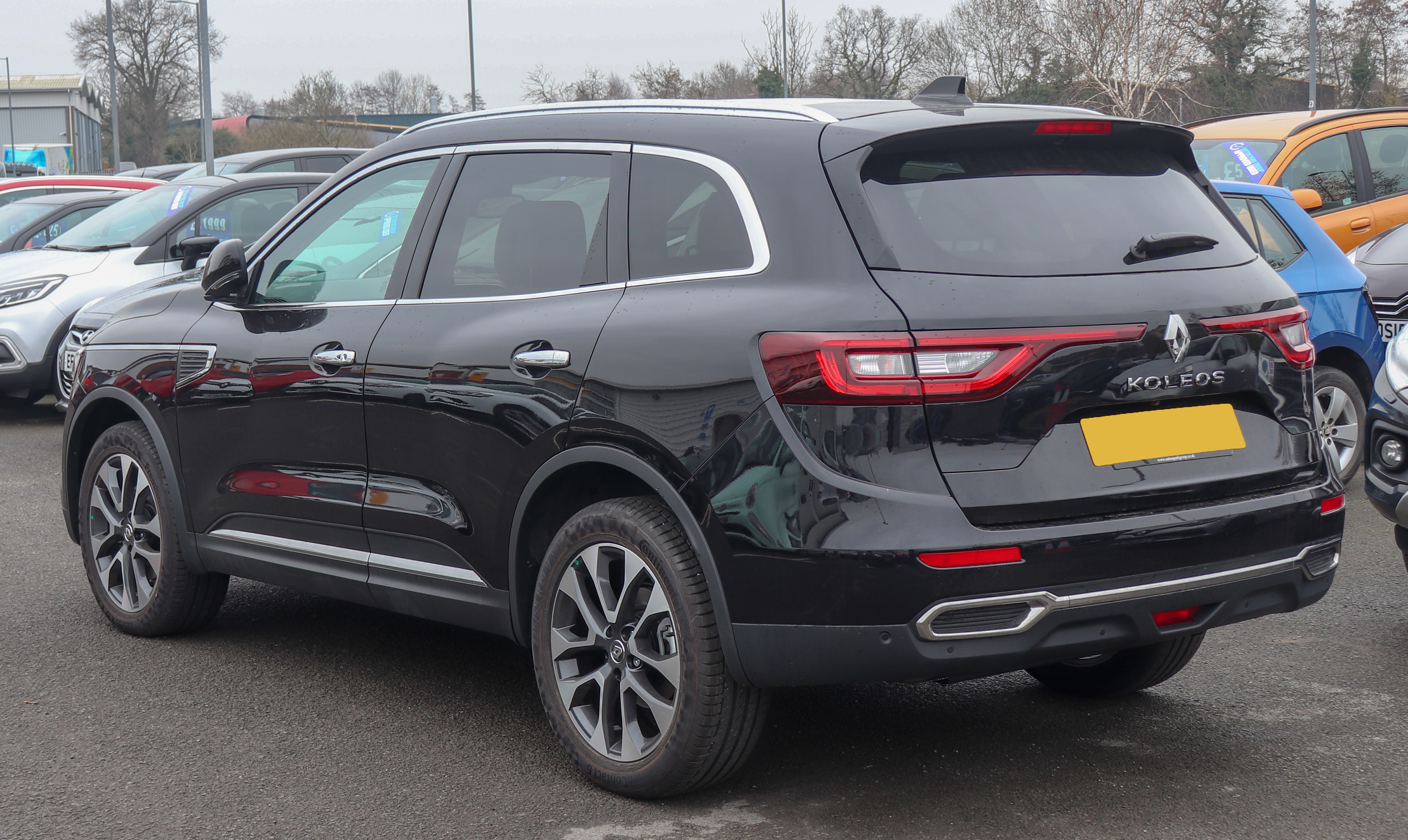
Rear view

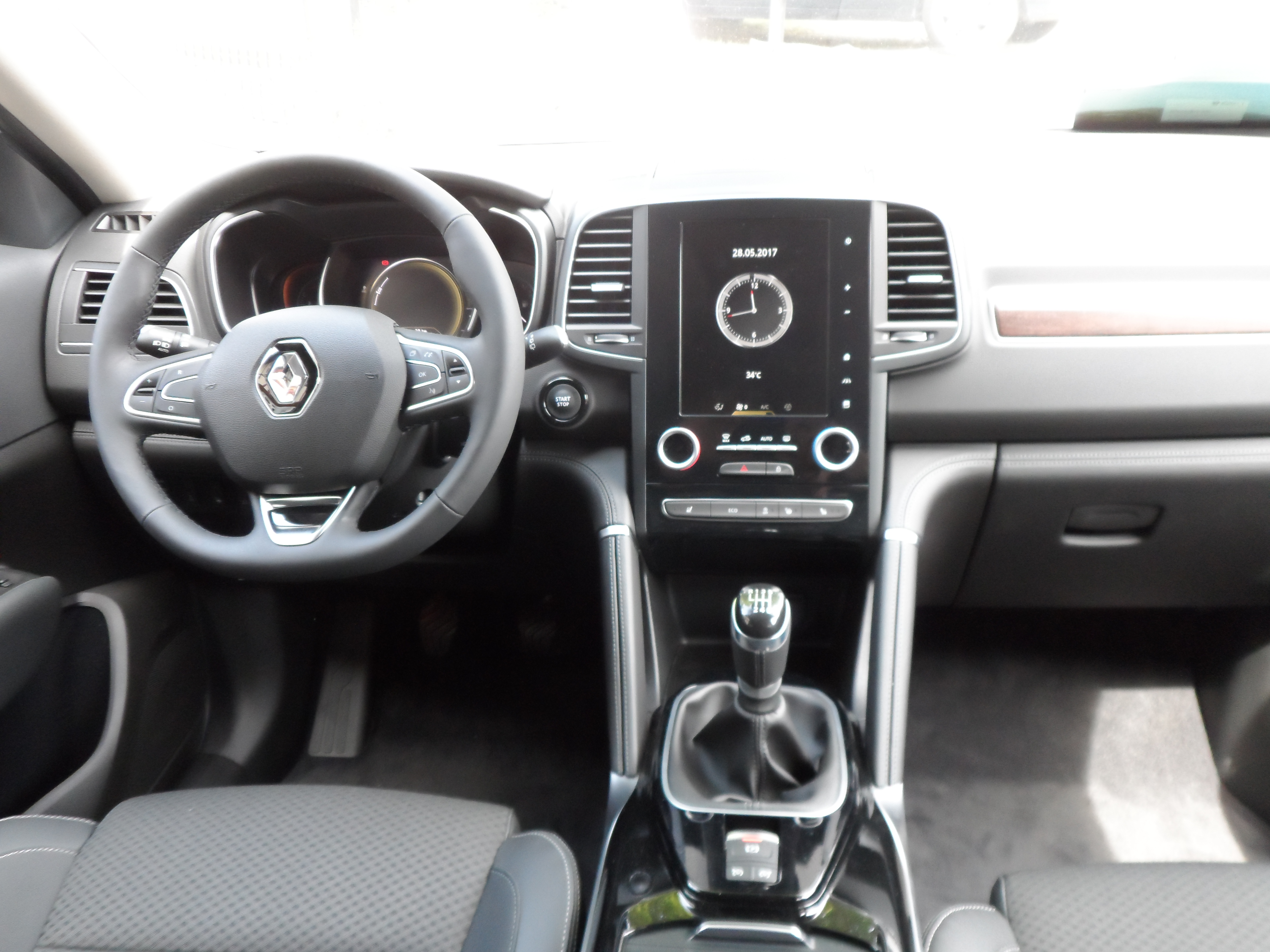
Interior

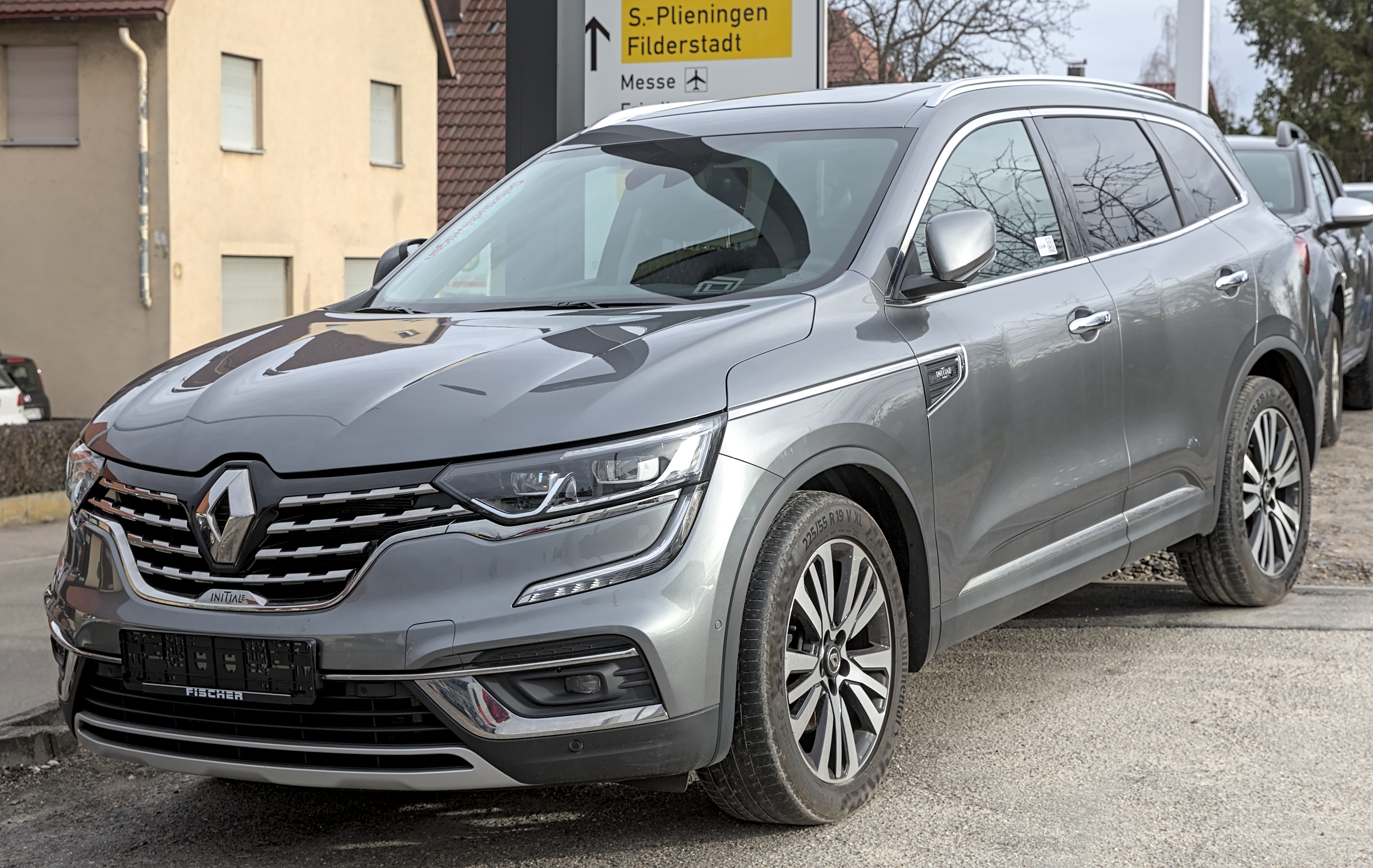
Renault Koleos (facelift)

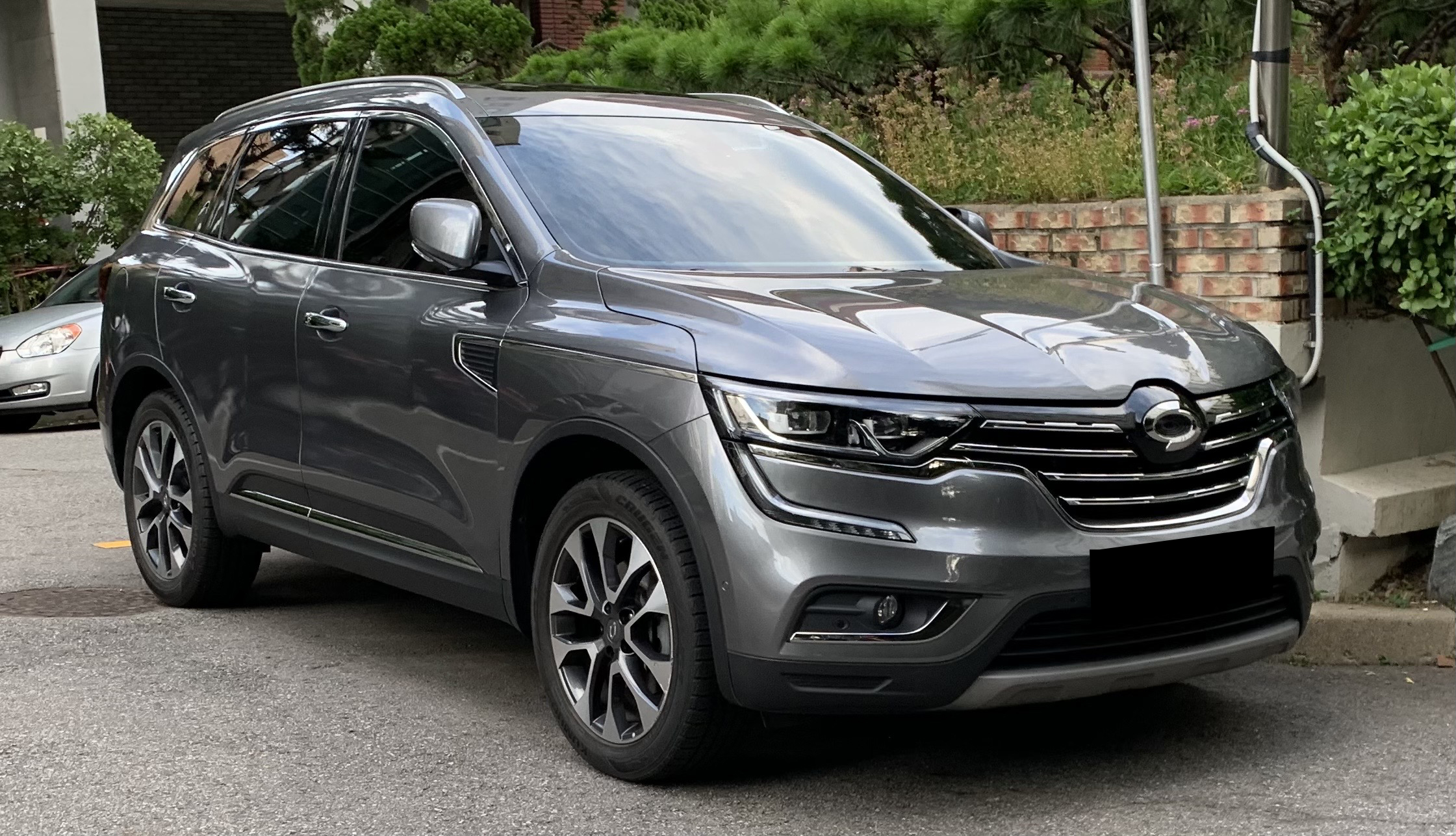
Renault Samsung QM6 (pre-facelift)

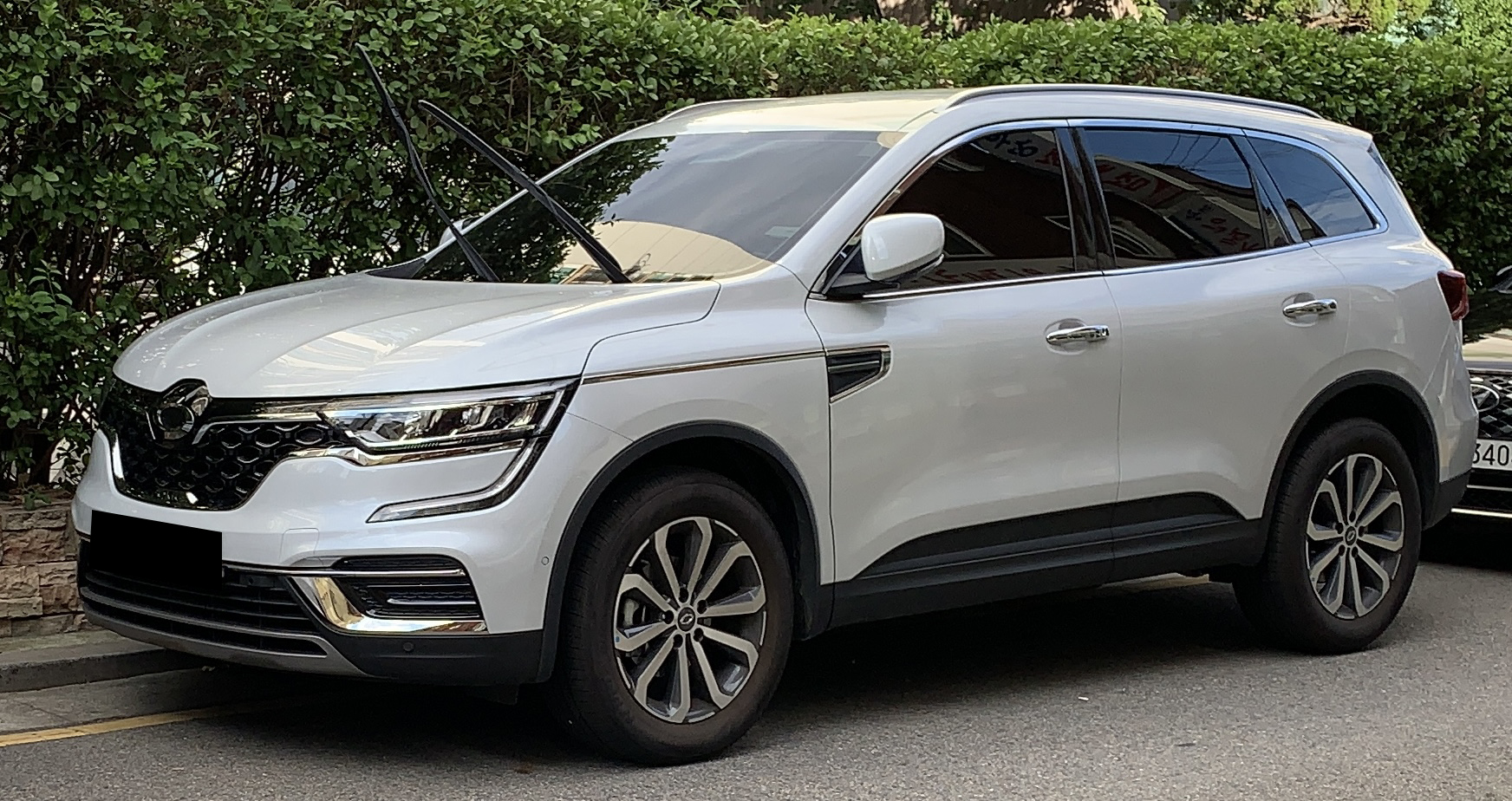
Renault Samsung QM6 (facelift)

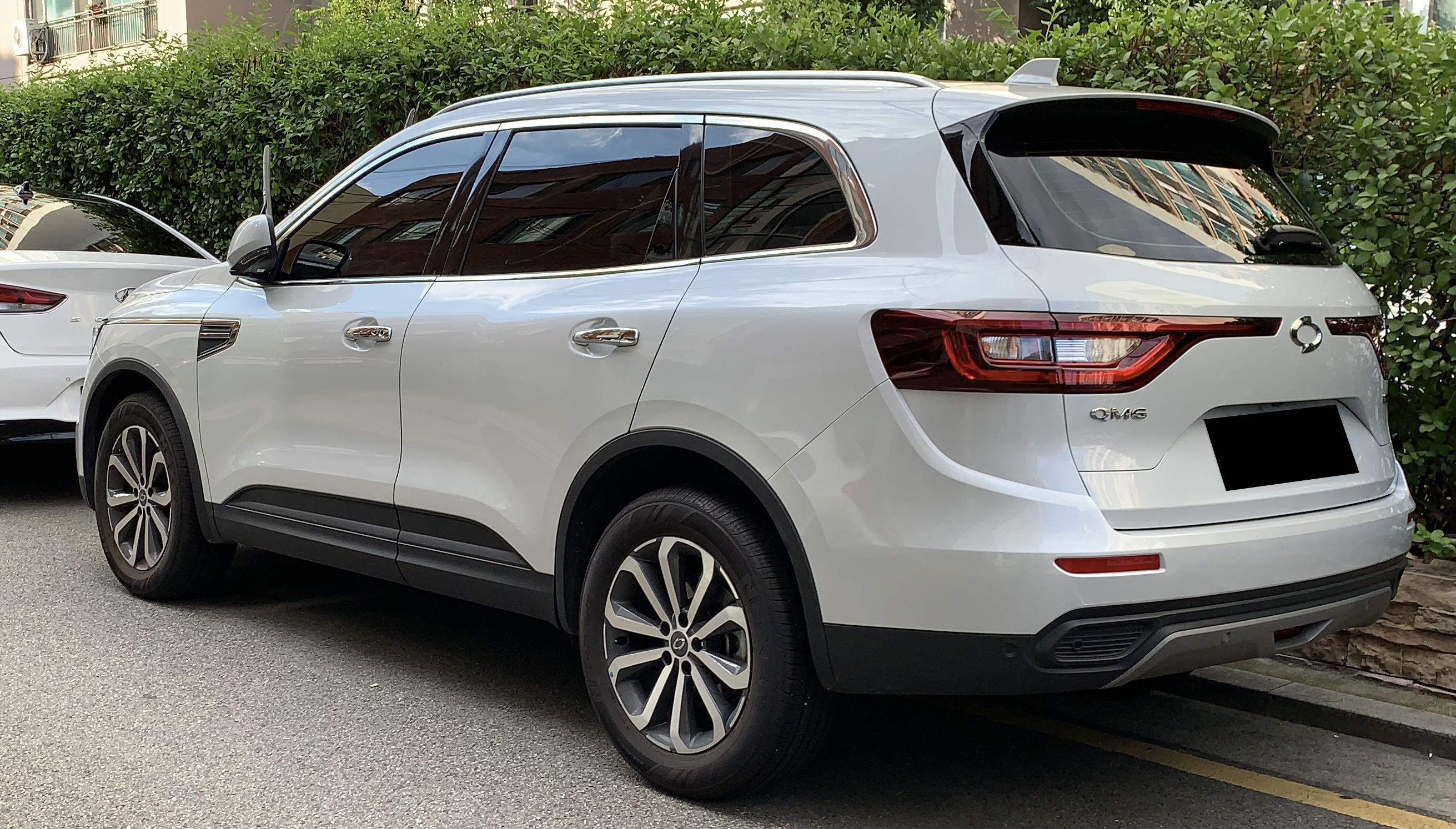
Renault Samsung QM6 (facelift)

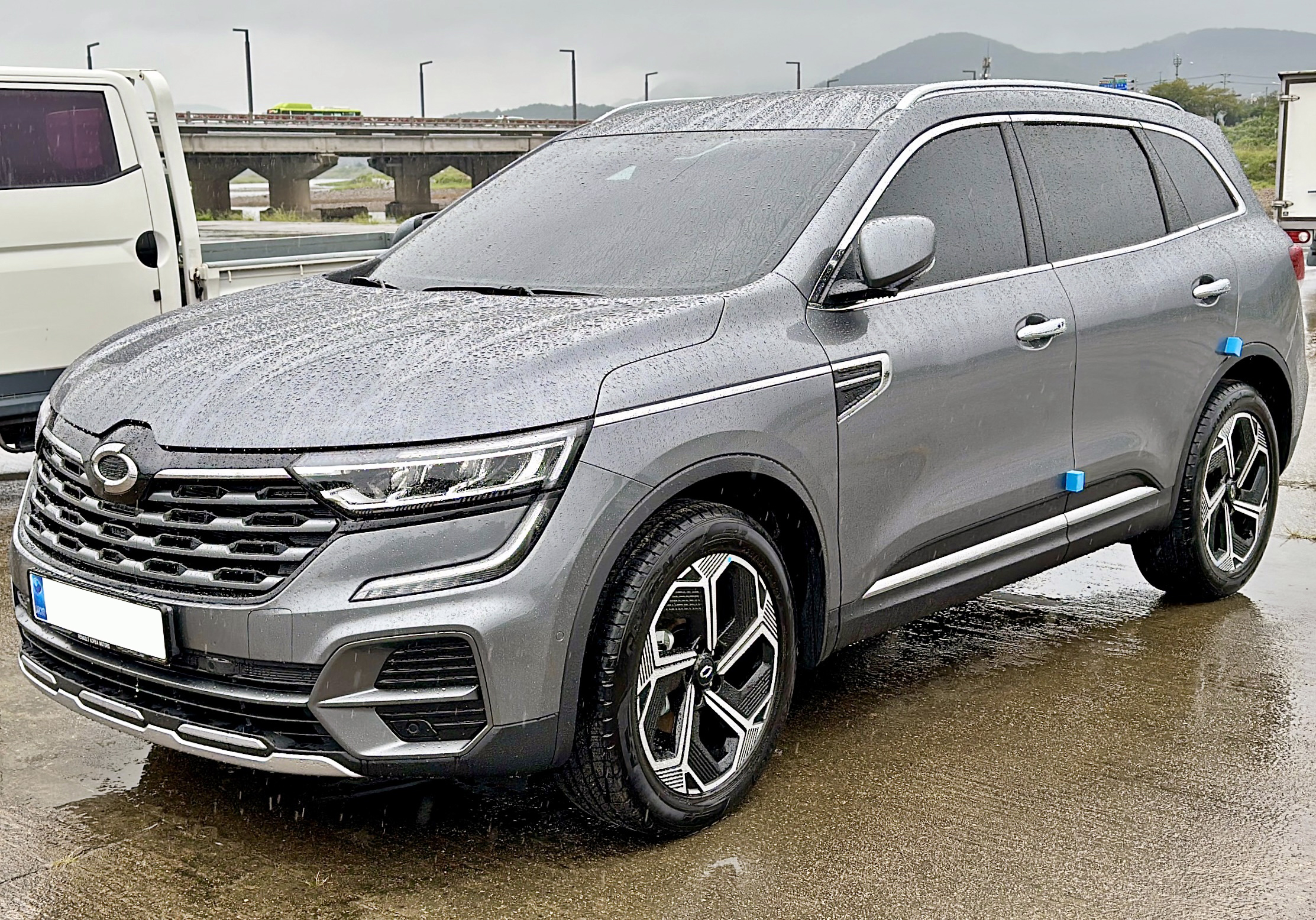
Renault Samsung QM6 (second facelift)

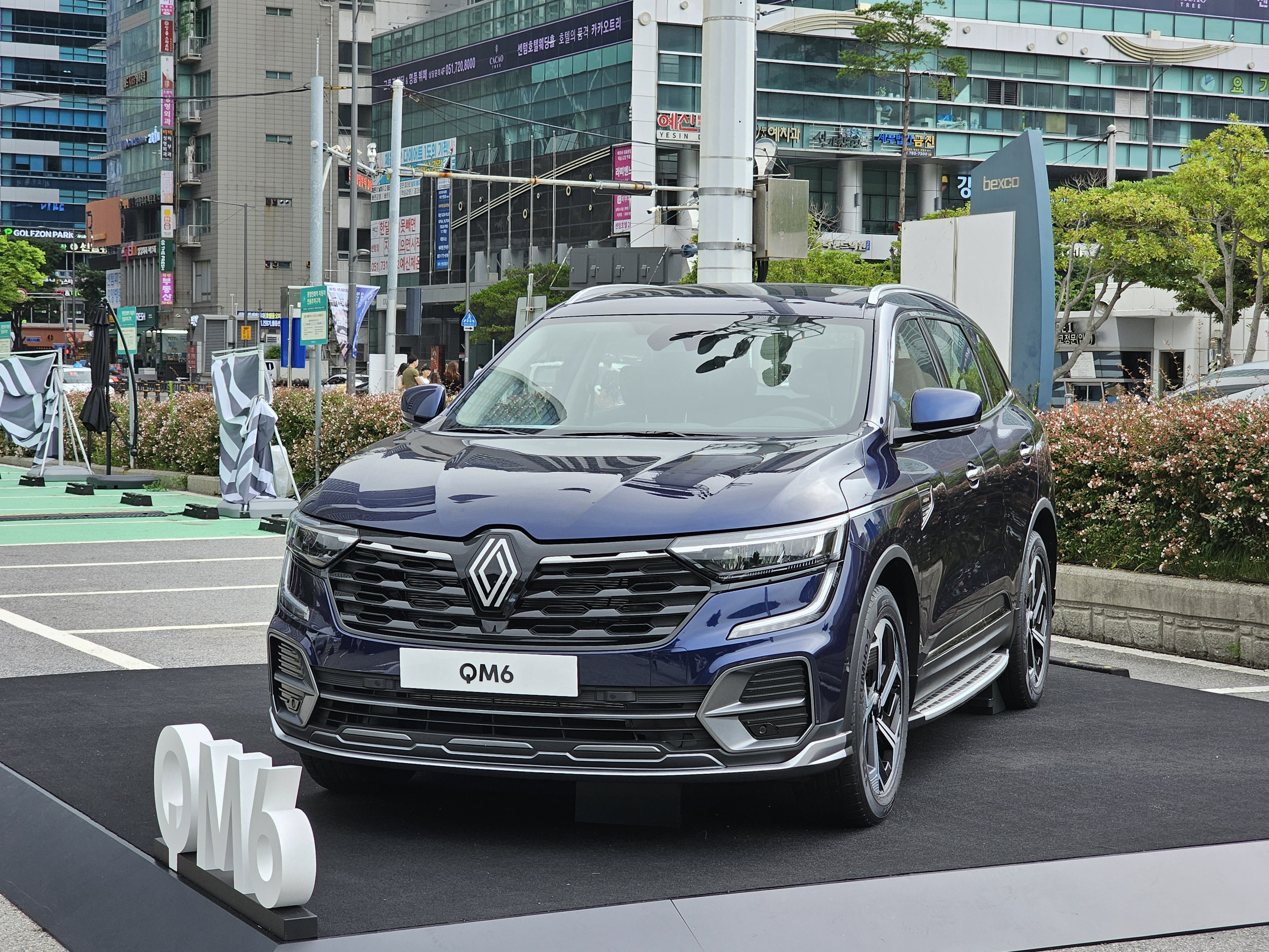
Renault QM6

=== Safety ===
ANCAP test results Renault Koleos (2017, aligned with Euro NCAP)
Test	Points	%
Overall:	5 /5 stars	
Adult occupant:	32	84%
Child occupant:	38.9	79%
Pedestrian:	26	62%
Safety assist:	6.3	52%

=== Powertrain ===
Engine	Displacement	Type	Power	Gearbox	Transmission
2.0 16v	1997cc	M5R	110 kW (148 hp)	X-CVT8	2WD
2.5 16v	2488cc	QR25	137 kW (184 hp)	X-CVT8	2WD or 4WD
1.6 dCi	1598cc	R9M	97 kW (130 hp)	6 speed manual	2WD
2.0 dCi	1995cc	M9R	132 kW (177 hp)	6 speed manual or X-CVT8	2WD or 4WD

== Third generation (AR1; 2024) ==
Third generation
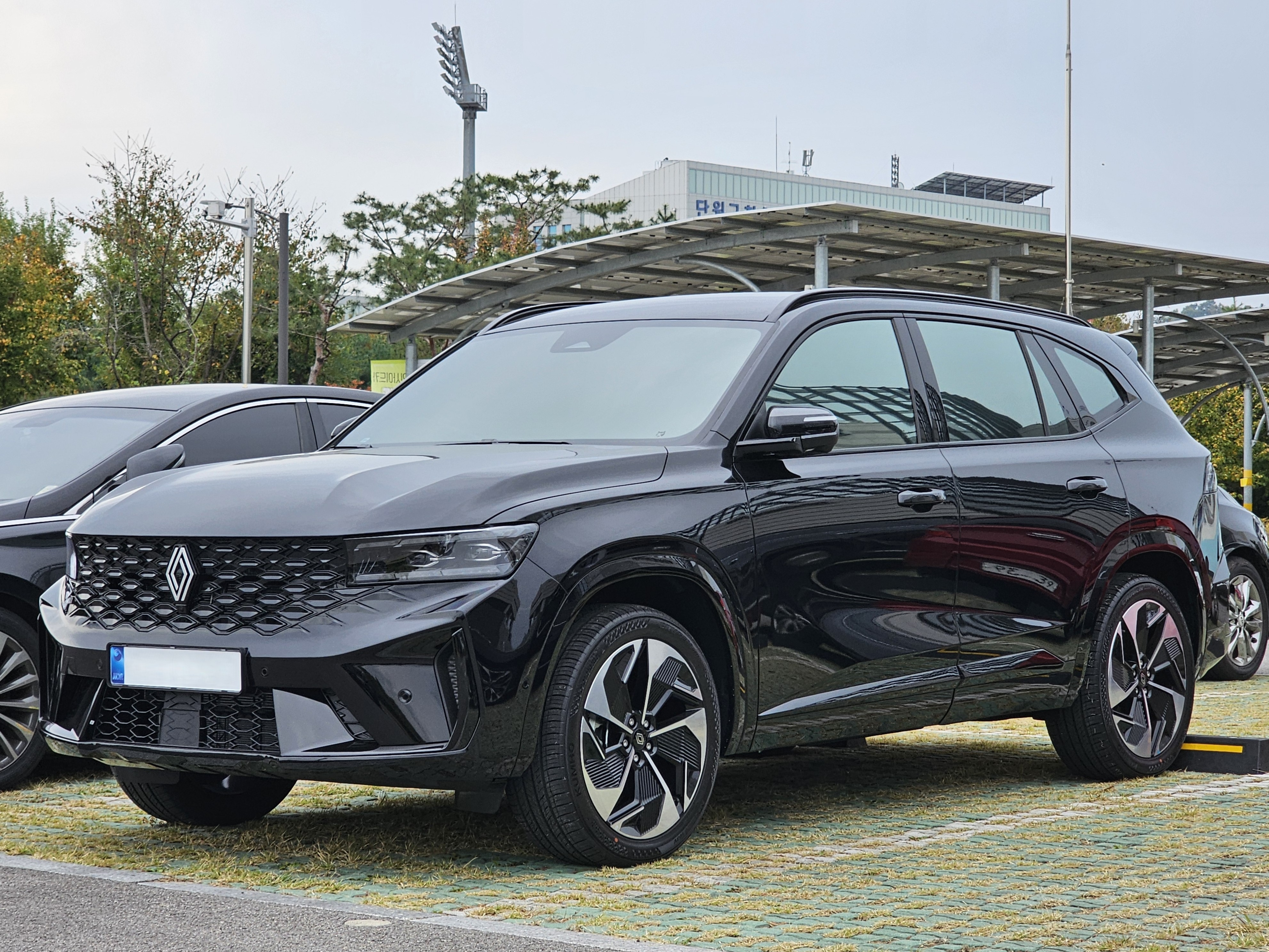

Overview
- Model code: AR1 (Aurora 1)
- Also called: Renault Grand Koleos (South Korea)
- Production: 2024–present
- Assembly: South Korea: Busan (Renault Korea)

Body and chassis
- Class: Mid-size crossover SUV (D)
- Platform: Compact Modular Architecture
- Related: Renault Filante; Geely Xingyue L / Monjaro

Powertrain
- Engine: Petrol: 2.0 L JLH-4G20TDB turbo I4; Petrol hybrid: 1.5 L BHE15-BFZ turbo I4
- Transmission: 7-speed DCT (FWD); 8-speed automatic (AWD); 3-speed DHT (hybrid)
- Battery: 1.64 kWh (hybrid)

Dimensions
- Wheelbase: 2,820 mm (111.0 in)
- Length: 4,780 mm (188.2 in)
- Width: 1,880 mm (74.0 in)
- Height: 1,680–1,705 mm (66.1–67.1 in)
- Curb weight: 1,655–1,750 kg (3,649–3,858 lb)

On 27 June 2024 at the Busan International Mobility Show, Renault Korea introduced the third-generation Koleos, marketed as the Renault Grand Koleos in South Korea. It is marketed as the Renault Koleos in export markets. The vehicle is heavily based on the Geely Xingyue L / Monjaro as part of Renault and Geely partnership in South Korea, and based on the Compact Modular Architecture vehicle platform. Exterior revisions compared to the Xingyue L include redesigned front and rear fascia, "borderless" front grille, and reshaped body panels.

The Grand Koleos was codenamed Aurora 1 during its development. It is the first introduction of the Koleos nameplate in South Korea, as the previous generations were marketed as the QM5 and QM6. Its design work was shared between Renault's design team in France and in Seoul, South Korea. Production in Renault Korea's plant in Busan is claimed to be supported by 200 local suppliers. It started in July 2024.

The model is larger than its predecessor, with Renault claiming a "class-leading" legroom for rear-seat passengers, and up to 2,034 litres of boot space with the rear seats folded. It shares the same dashboard with the Geely Xingyue L, including a 12.3-inch digital instrument display, 12.3-inch infotainment screen, and another 12.3-inch touchscreen for the front passenger, all marketed as "openR" and powered by Qualcomm's infotainment platform. Notable equipment include a 10-speaker Bose sound system, 25.6-inch augmented reality head-up display and 5G connectivity.

For the South Korean market, three trims are available: Techno, Iconic, and the four-wheel drive (4WD) Esprit Alpine. The petrol-powered model of the Grand Koleos is a 2.0-litre turbocharged direct injection engine with a 7-speed dual-clutch transmission (or a 8-speed automatic for the 4WD model), producing a maximum output of 211 PS (208 hp; 155 kW) and 325 N⋅m (33.1 kg⋅m; 240 lb⋅ft). The 4WD models are equipped with BorgWarner's 6th generation four-wheel-drive system. The hybrid powertrain, marketed as E-Tech Hybrid is a Geely-developed system combining a 1.64 kWh battery with a 1.5-litre turbocharged petrol engine and a multi-mode gearbox, delivering a peak output of 245 PS (242 hp; 180 kW). It is able to operate electric-only driving in 75% of a trip in urban areas below 40 km/h (25 mph).

The third-generation Koleos was unveiled in the Middle East on 12 May 2025. It was also shipped to Mexico and Colombia in May 2025. Argentina in August 2025. There are plans to market the Korean-assembled Koleos in Brazil, Uruguay, Panama, the Dominican Republic, and African countries.

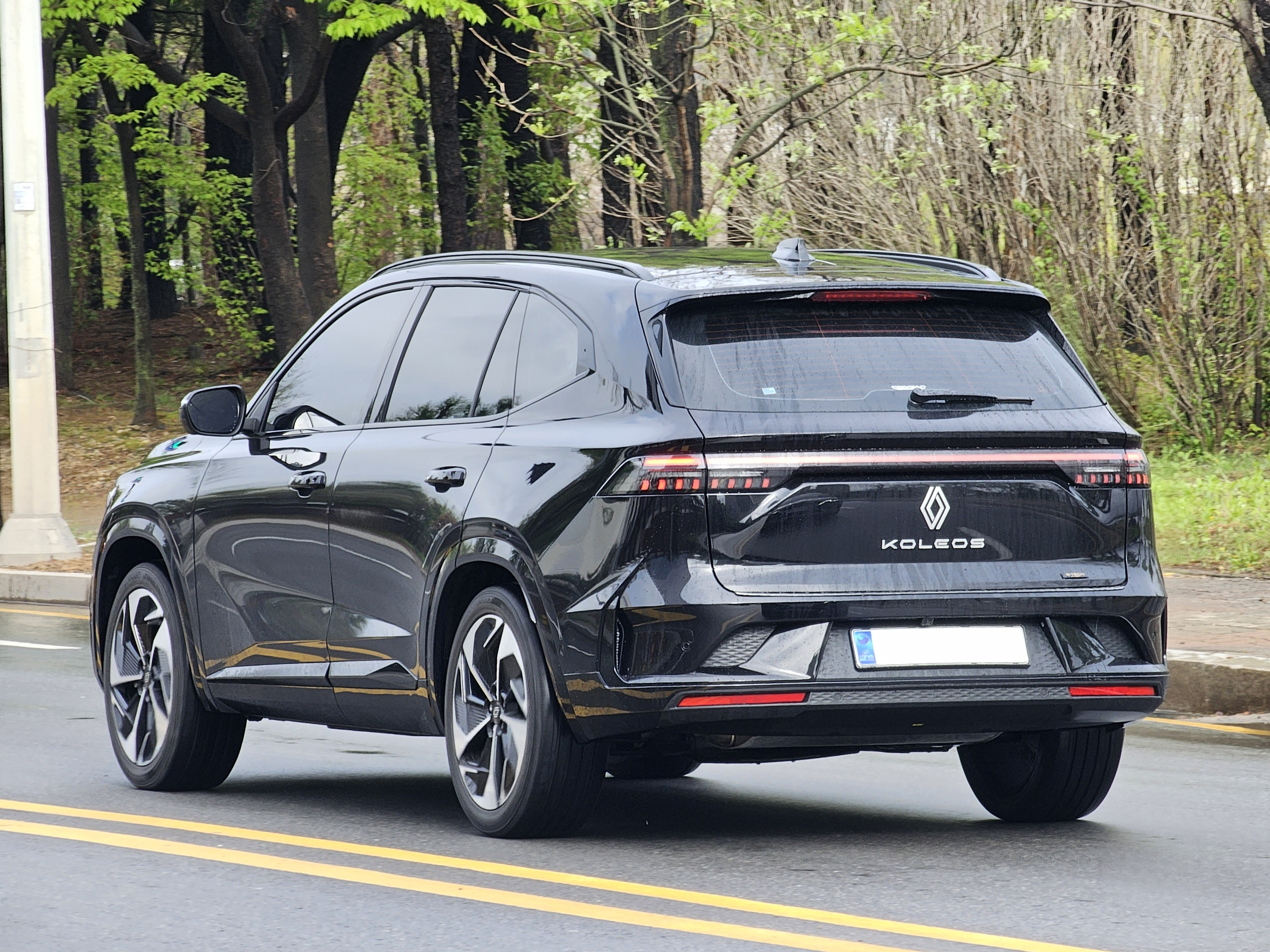
Rear view

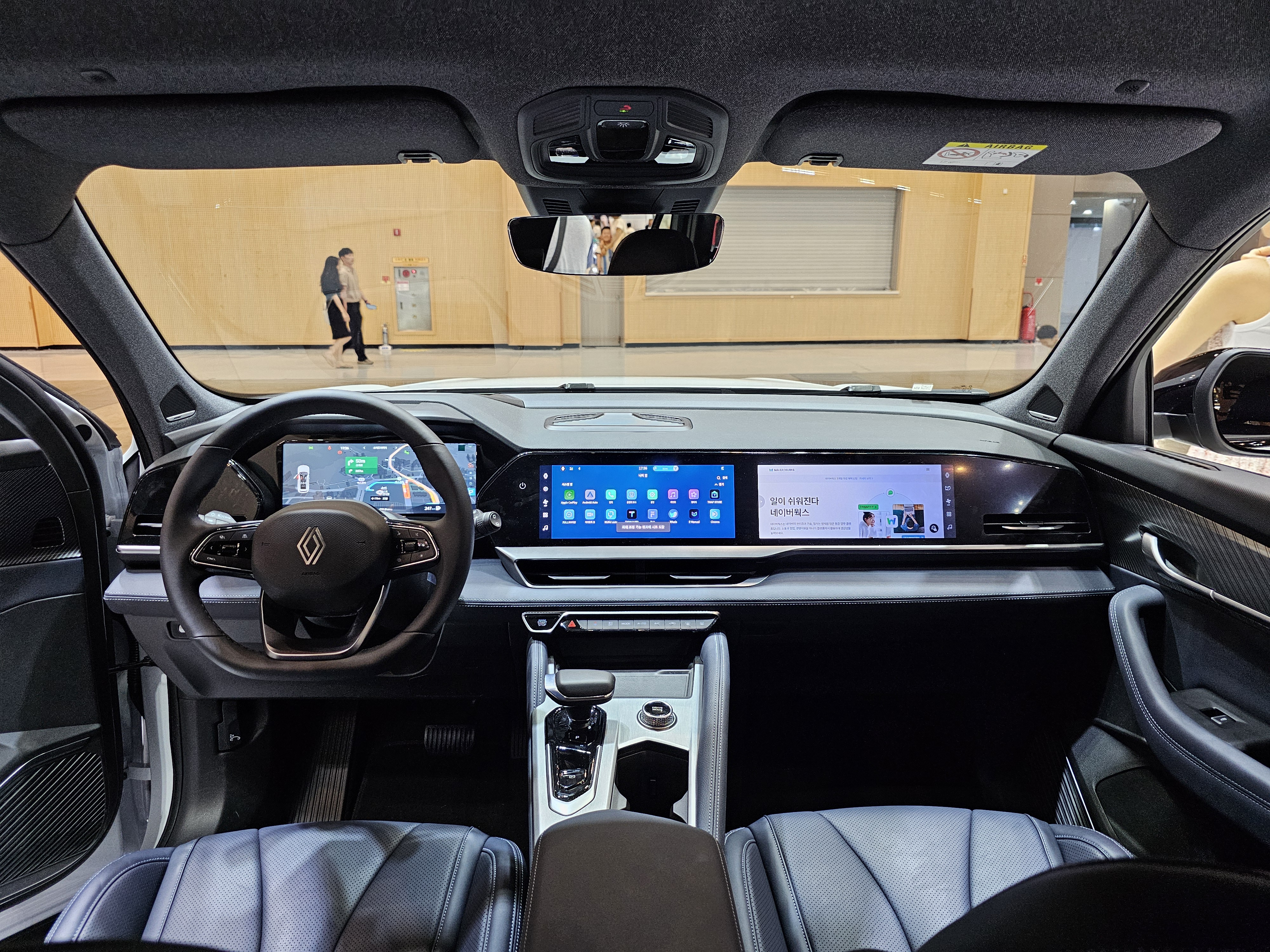
Interior

== Sales ==
Year	Europe	China	Australia	Mexico	South Korea		
Year	Europe	China	Australia	Mexico	QM5	QM6	Grand Koleos
2007	1						
2008	17,645						
2009	21,765						
2010	13,828						
2011	16,874						
2012	15,282						
2013	8,404						
2014	7,418		1,709		8,947		
2015	4,675		1,419		6,804		
2016	186	6,027	1,524		1,163	14,126	
2017	13,232	46,321	3,120	2,486		27,837	
2018	18,999	32,606	2,992	2,089		32,999	
2019	12,371	8,445	2,533	1,815		47,640	
2020	6,916	578	2,408	1,611		46,825	
2021	6,048		1,937	2,568		37,747	
2022			1,202			27,440	
2023						9,047	
2024							22,034
2025							40,877
