= Renault Filante (crossover) =

Full hybrid mid-size crossover SUV

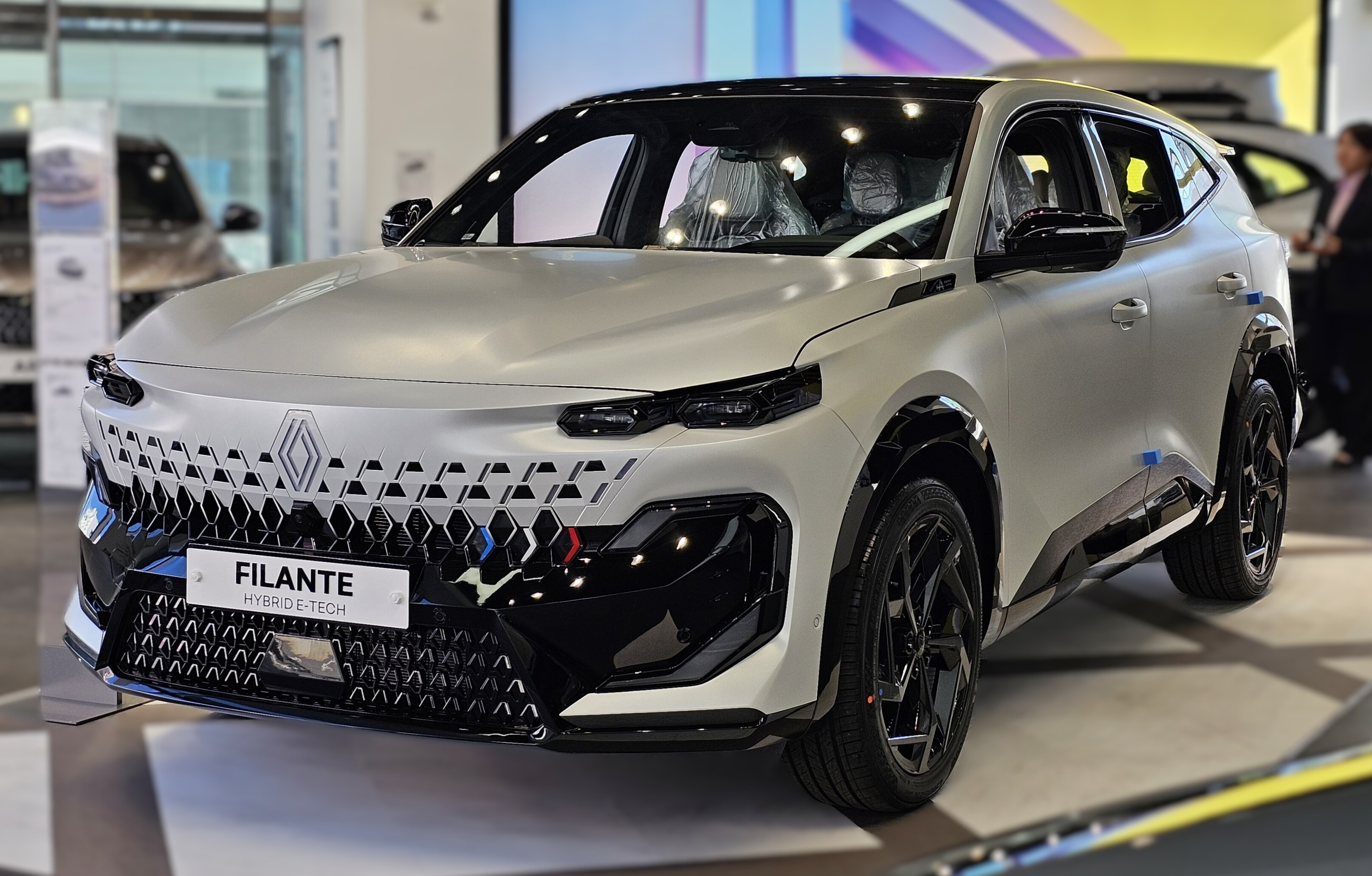
- The Renault Filante Hybrid E-Tech Esprit Alpine 1955 at a dealership in Goyang, South Korea.

Overview
- Manufacturer: Renault
- Model code: AR2
- Production: 2026–present
- Assembly: South Korea: Busan (Renault Korea)

Body and chassis
- Class: Mid-size crossover SUV (D)
- Body style: 5-door SUV
- Layout: Front-engine, front-motor, front-wheel-drive
- Platform: Geely Compact Modular Architecture
- Related: Geely Xingyue L / Monjaro; Renault Koleos / Grand Koleos

Powertrain
- Engine: Gasoline hybrid: 1.5 L BHE15-BFZ turbocharged I4
- Transmission: 3-speed DHT
- Hybrid drivetrain: Series-parallel
- Battery: 1.64 kWh NMC

Dimensions
- Wheelbase: 2,820 mm (111.0 in)
- Length: 4,915 mm (193.5 in)
- Width: 1,890 mm (74.4 in)
- Height: 1,635 mm (64.4 in)
- Curb weight: 1,820 kg (4,012 lb)

The Renault Filante is a full hybrid mid-size crossover SUV produced by Renault and is based on a platform developed by Geely. It is Renault's largest production SUV at around 4.92 m.

== Overview ==
The Fabrice Cambolive, CEO of Renault, unveiled the brand's "International Game Plan" in 2023 that involves launching 8 new cars outside of the European market. The Filante will be based on Geely's Compact Modular Architecture, which is currently being used by the Grand Koleos. South Korea is where the Filante will initially be sold, and it will also be built there, with production planned to take place in the facility in Busan. It is the 5th of the 8 models that Renault planned to introduce as part of its International Game Plan.

Sylvia Dos Santos, Renault's naming strategy lead, stated that "Filante" was chosen for "its evocation of shooting stars, outer space and journeys," themes that are said to mirror the design of the car. It was unveiled on January 13, 2026. The reveal of the Filante will also be livestreamed digitally.

The Filante itself was designed in South Korea.

=== Design ===
LED lights are embedded in the front bumper, an aerodynamic roofline, and a "muscular" rear shoulder, as described by Thanos Pappas of Carscoops. Jordan Katsianis of Auto Express has also described the front end of the Filante as "similar to those on the latest Clio".

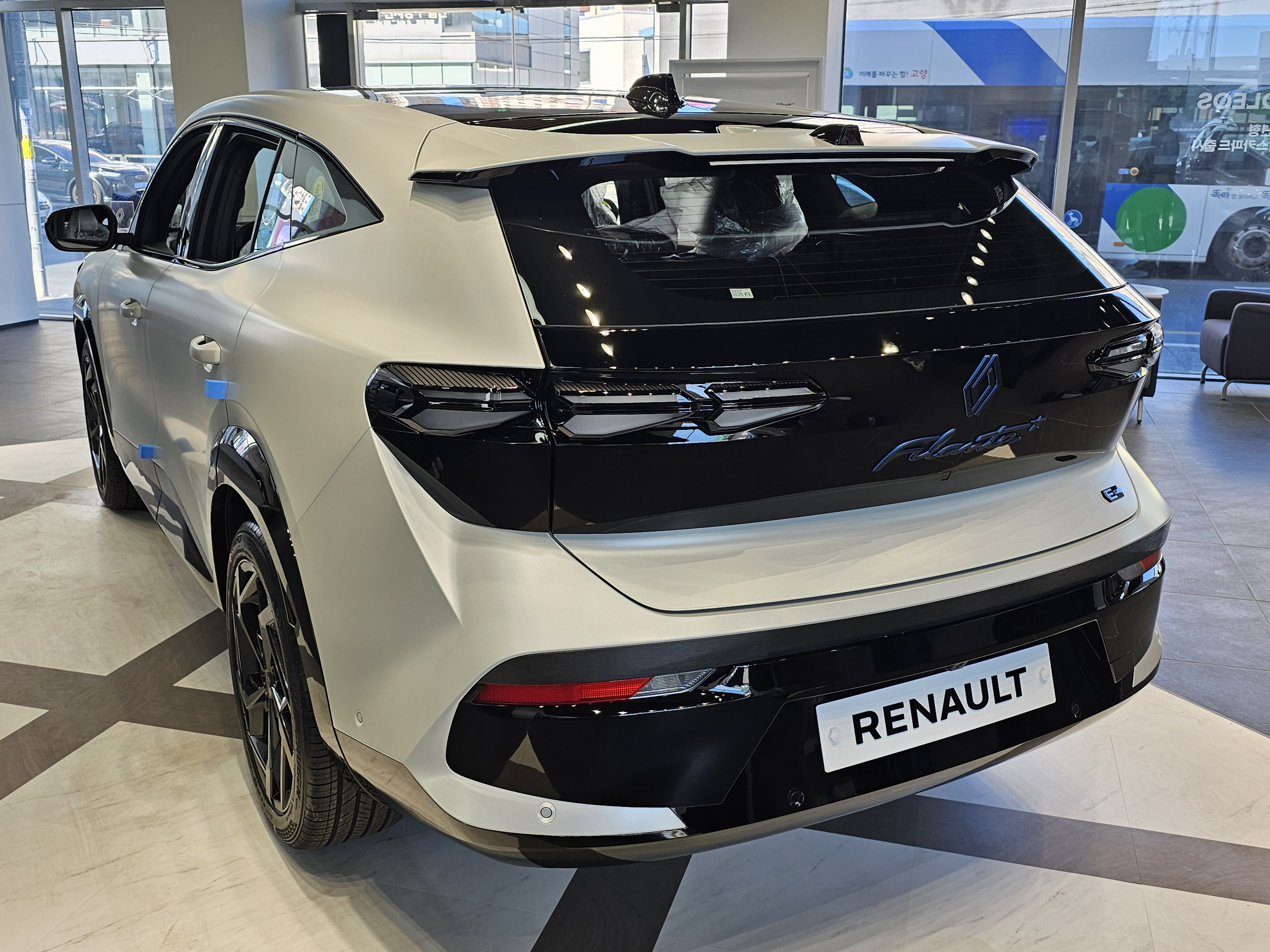
Rear View

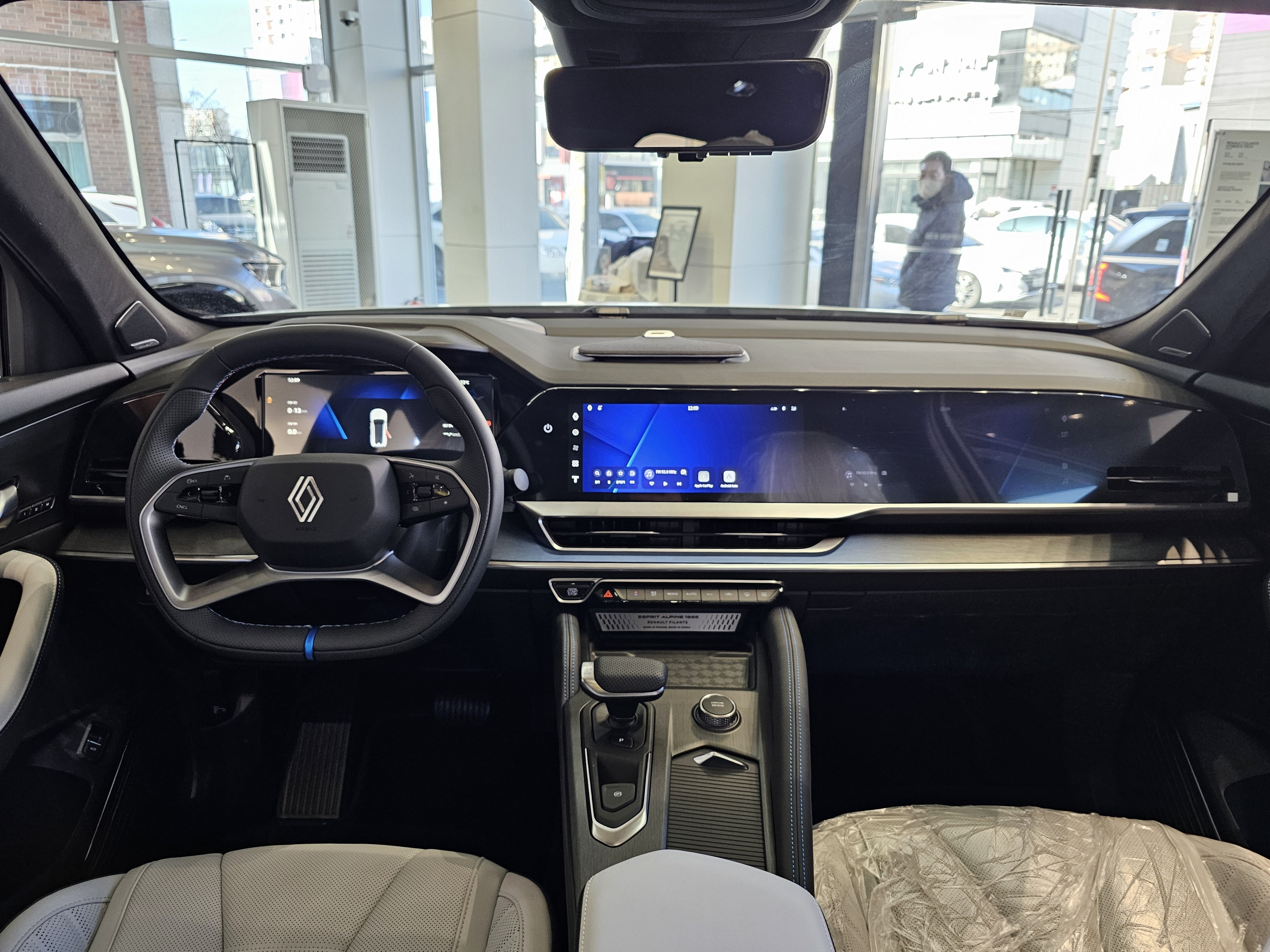
Interior

=== Features ===
The interior of the Filante uses three 12.3-inch screens and a 25.6-inch augmented reality heads-up display. An Arkamys or Bose audio system is included depending on the trim level. Some trims also include tri-zone climate control and a panoramic sunroof.

== Powertrain ==
As the Filante will be based on the same platform as the Grand Koleos, the powertrain options from said model were expected to carry over. This meant the Filante was expected to use a 2-liter turbocharged inline 4 codenamed JLH-4G20TDB for the gasoline version and a 1.5 liter turbocharged inline 4 codenamed JLH-3G15TD (also known by Geely as the BHE15-BFZ) for the hybrid version and would be available in both front-wheel-drive and all-wheel-drive. Both engines are part of the Volvo Engine Architecture.

At the reveal of the Filante, it was confirmed that it would only be offered as a full hybrid. The Filante uses a 1.5 liter turbocharged inline 4 gasoline engine codenamed JLH-3G15TD or BHE15-BFZ, has a power output of 247 horsepower (184 kW; 250 PS), a torque output of 417 pound force-feet (565 N⋅m), and has a 3-speed dedicated hybrid transmission. Unlike the Grand Koleos, the Filante is only available in front-wheel-drive form.
