= Renault GTA =

Renault GTA may refer to:

- A performance version of the Renault Alliance
- The British market name for the Renault Alpine GTA
