= Peugeot 604 =

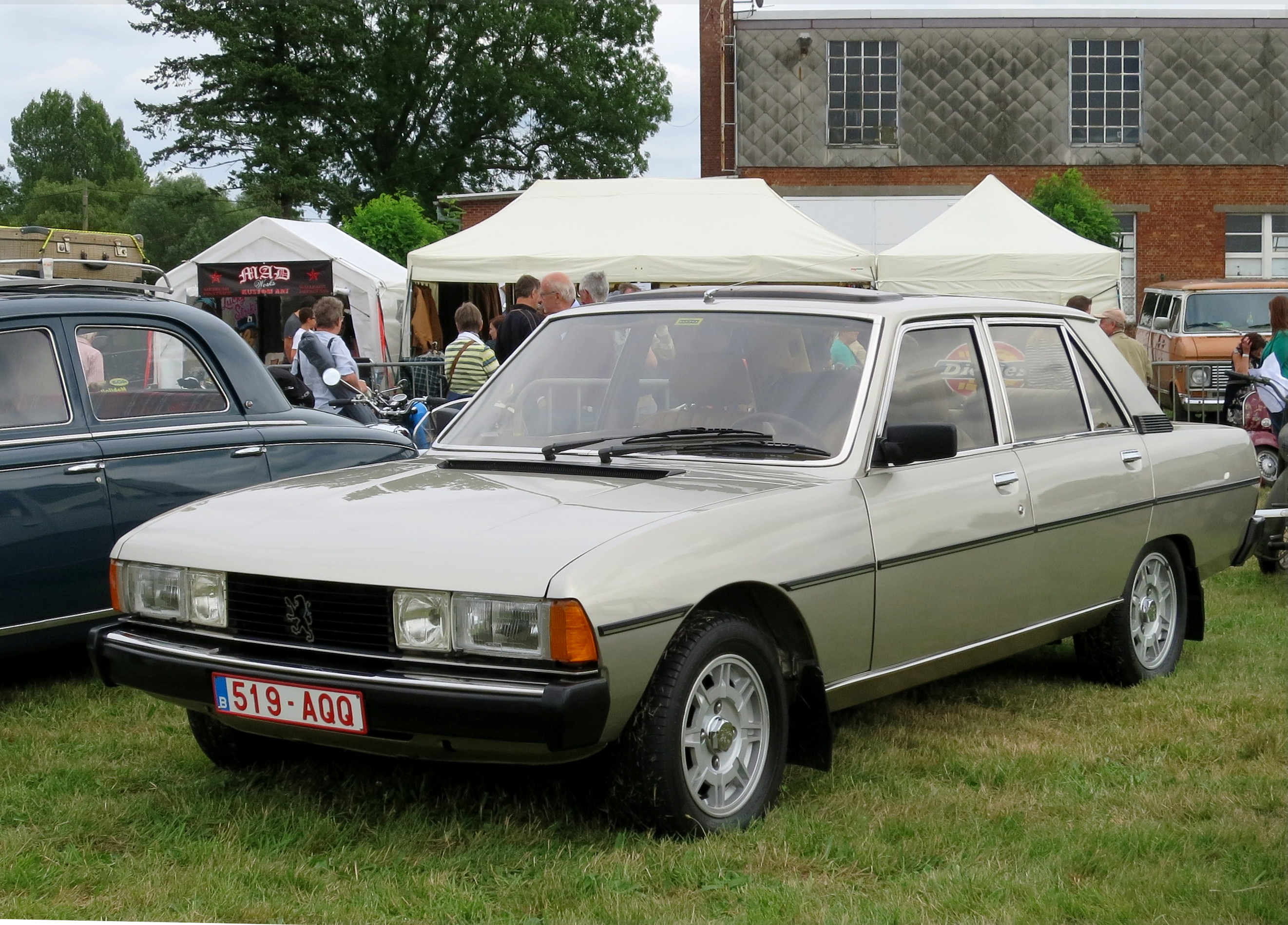

Overview
- Manufacturer: Peugeot
- Production: March 1975 – November 1985
- Assembly: France: Sochaux (Sochaux Plant); France: Cerizay (Heuliez: Limousine); South Korea: Gwangmyeong (Kia: 1979–1981)
- Designer: Aldo Brovarone at Pininfarina

Body and chassis
- Class: Mid-size luxury / Executive car (E)
- Body style: 4-door saloon
- Layout: FR layout
- Related: Peugeot 504

Powertrain
- Engine: petrol; 2.7 L PRV V6; 2.8 L PRV V6; diesel: 2.3 L XD2S turbo I4; 2.5 L XD3S/XD3T turbo I4
- Transmission: 4-speed manual 5-speed manual 3-speed automatic

Dimensions
- Wheelbase: 2,800 mm (110.2 in)
- Length: 4,720 mm (185.8 in)
- Width: 1,770 mm (69.7 in)
- Height: 1,435 mm (56.5 in)
- Curb weight: 1,450 kg (3,197 lb)

Chronology
- Successor: Peugeot 605

The Peugeot 604 is an executive car produced by the French manufacturer Peugeot from 1975 to 1985. 153,252 cars were sold during its 10-year production life. It was made in France and also assembled by Kia in South Korea, between 1979 and 1981.

The Pininfarina-designed 604 was unveiled at the Geneva Motor Show in March 1975 and drew praise for its formal, handsome styling. Denmark's Bilrevyen 1976 ("The Car Review 1976"), for example, described the styling as possessing a "calm elegance". Sales began in September 1975. Based "on the principles of the Peugeot 504", using its bulkhead, doors, and part of the 504 floorpan, and usually powered by the then-new 144 PS (106 kW) 2.7-litre V6 PRV engine, developed in conjunction with Renault and Volvo, the car was Peugeot's first entry into the large luxury saloon market for 40 years - the most recent being the short-lived Peugeot 601 of 1934.

== In the marketplace ==
The Sochaux-built 604 represented Peugeot's first entry into the market segment for executive cars since the 1930s. It augmented the Peugeot range. The drive to enter a product in this class came from the increased affluence of the French market which Peugeot felt could accommodate a car more expensive than the 504.

Price at launch was US$10,990. In the UK the car was sold for £4,785 (compared to £4,399 for a BMW 520, £4,361 for a Citroën CX Pallas, and £3,485 for a Ford Granada 3000 GL).

The 604 had several noteworthy attributes. From the 504, it inherited a damped and supple ride, equal to a contemporary Jaguar XJ6, its "good handling", its spacious passenger compartment and highly rated steering described as "a model of its kind", "highly accurate" and "one of the finest yet produced". The 604 had unusually wide opening doors which made entry and egress very easy for users. This was especially appropriate for the car in its role as a limousine.

Despite critical success, the 604 was a commercial failure. The production of 153,252 units was half that of the V8 engine Rover 3500 and an eighth of its stablemate, the CX. Peugeot made a profit on each car made, primarily because of the shared tooling and engineering with the 504, but the car ceased production without an immediate successor.

France's car manufacturers have not had much success internationally in the executive segment after the Citroën DS's successor, the underpowered Citroën CX. The 604-era was perhaps the last point at which PSA Peugeot Citroën could theoretically have focused resources on becoming a viable long-term competitor in this lucrative market segment. PSA Peugeot Citroën actually went in the opposite direction, creating a third competitor, the Talbot Tagora.

The German manufacturers did not hesitate to exploit this confusion in France, with cars like the 1974 BMW 5 Series (which also entered a segment new for the manufacturer) that had relatively good build quality. German cars created an unassailable position in the executive class auto market during the late 1970s and early 1980s. The Germans were not challenged again until Japan addressed this segment 15 years later.

Like the situation in the US with the Lincoln Town Car, French luxury cars are now primarily used in fleets.

The 604 was introduced during the recession caused by the 1973 energy crisis, which created a marketplace that was even more unfriendly to large-engined cars in France. Contemporary journalists attributed this relative failure to a variety of reasons, such as the conservative styling, the lack of technical innovation, modest performance, and a reputation for problems with rust. Others said that the recent energy crisis made this an inauspicious time for Peugeot (along with Renault, whose own six-cylinder saloon went on sale a few months earlier) to be moving into the market for six-cylinder saloons. However, by the time the oil shock hit the western economies Peugeot, along with joint venture partners Renault and Volvo, presumably believed they had invested too much in the design and development of production facilities for the new shared engine that would power the 604, to abandon the venture.

Over 36,000 cars were built in the first full year of production (1976). The launch of the similarly sized but cheaper Peugeot 505 in 1979 along with another oil crisis, halved sales of the V6-engined 604. By 1981 7,000 examples were produced.

Peugeot did launch some detuned economy versions of the 604, but they did not do much to increase the car's overall sales. Most surprisingly, a turbodiesel version was introduced at the 1978 Geneva Motor Show, alongside the expected 305 D. Peugeot initially tried to convince buyers of the upper-middle class that the 604 had "The engineering of the Mercedes-Benz 280E, the handling of the BMW 5 Series and the elegance of the Jaguar XJ6 " but did not convince enough buyers of this proposition.

Sales, which were only strong for a few years after launch, dipped further in 1980 following the launch of the 505, and the last 604 rolled off the production line in 1985. A mere 581 examples were produced in 1985, with sales continuing into 1986. Peugeot's next major executive car, the 605, was launched in 1989 although a V6-engined 505 served as an interim flagship model.

Today the 604 is a rare automobile in United Kingdom - there are only 17 that are road-legal as of the second quarter of 2014.

=== Development ===
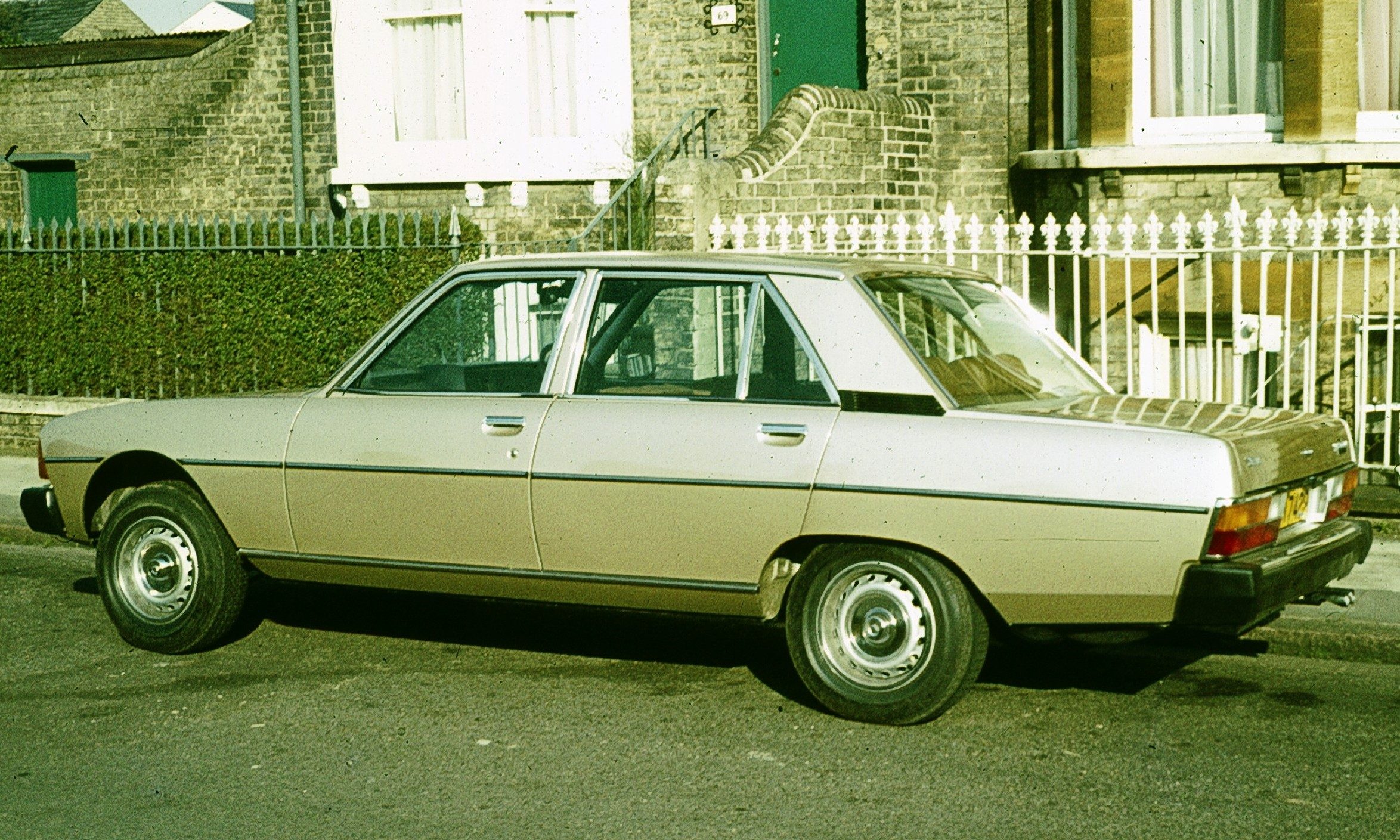
Peugeot 604

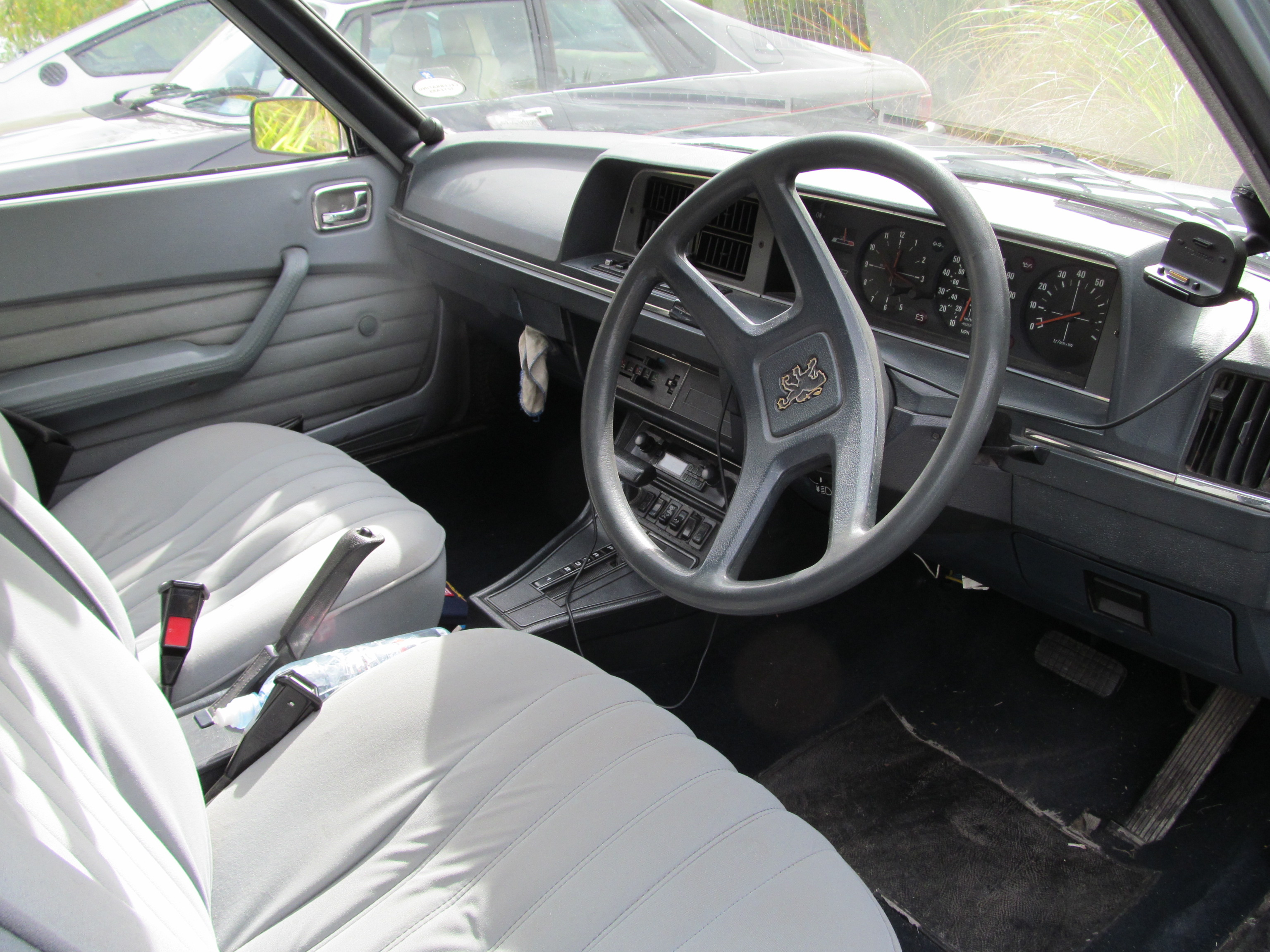
Interior

The 604 was launched in March 1975, at the Geneva Motor Show. It was originally available in a single specification, as the 604 SL. In 1977, the 604 was launched in the US in carbureted V6 SL trim, with twin rectangular headlights and larger bumpers. In September, the somewhat quicker 604 TI model with Bosch K-Jetronic fuel injection and a five-speed manual transmission was added. In late 1978, for the 1979 model year, the 80 horsepower 604 D turbo turbodiesel model was introduced; it entered production in February 1979. The diesel could be ordered with either a four- or a five-speed manual transmission, as well as the GM-sourced three-speed automatic. The six-cylinder 604's received modified gearbox ratios.

For 1979 there were some minor modifications, including the change of the petrol filler cap from round to square. The US 604s receives a larger 2849 cc engine, although with no change in power. In 1980 the 604 underwent a minor facelift, featuring a new rear-view mirror, while the bonnet badge was removed, the indicators were changed to orange, and there was also a new plastic dashboard and gearstick. The limited edition luxury "Grand Comfort" model with power windows and locks, a sunroof, tinted windows, and other amenities was also made available this year. US sales "faded away" during 1980.

In 1981 the 604 STi, with Michelin TRX tyres and alloy wheels, was introduced. From January 1981, the automatic gearboxes used in the 604 were no longer sourced from General Motors' factory in Alsace, but rather from ZF in Germany. The existing diesel model was replaced with two different specifications, GRDT and SRDT. Total body immersion anti-corrosion treatment was also introduced across the entire range. The turbo diesel was now exported to US, where it replaced the already absent V6 entirely. In 1982, the carburetted base 604 SL was discontinued and in 1983 the TI and GRD Turbo versions were removed from the lineup; this left only the STi and SRD Turbo.

In 1984, the 604 GTi with a 2.8-litre engine was introduced, replacing the 2.7-litre STi. Also, the new GTDT diesel model was introduced. US sales were discontinued after 1984. In November of the next year (1985), the production of the 604 came to an end. As a partial replacement, a V6 version of the 505 soon appeared, and in 1989 the front-wheel-drive Peugeot 605 arrived to fill the empty slot left by the 604.

=== Turbodiesel ===
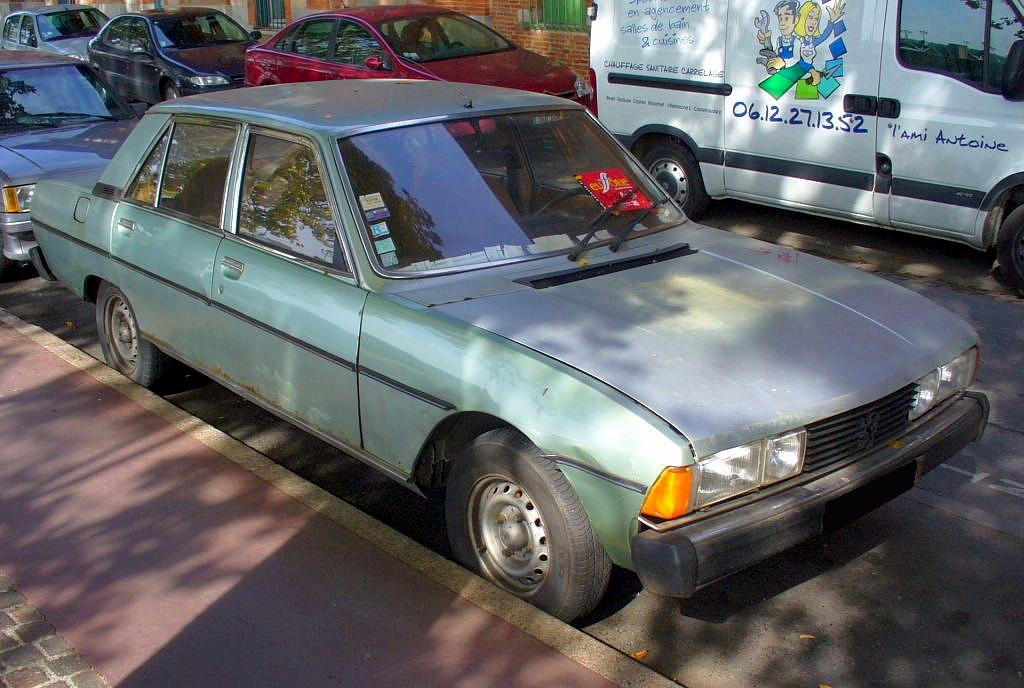
Peugeot 604 D Turbo

The 604 is noted for being the first production turbodiesel car ("604 D turbo") to be sold in Europe, the Mercedes-Benz 300 SD having been marketed in North America since 1977. The turbodiesel was launched in 1979. It uses the 80 PS (59 kW) 2,304 cc Indénor Diesel engine with a turbo fitted, designation XD2S. This was a reliable engine, overshadowed by one major problem. Like many diesel engines of the time they were hard to start in the cold weather, the 604 was one of the worst with this problem, it was a very difficult car to start and some owners ensured it was parked on a hill to get around this. However, some minor tweaks to the glow plugs and compression made the car easier to start.

The tall inline-four diesel engine was slanted at 20 degrees to fit underneath the low bonnet of the 604. Sometime in 1983, this was upgraded to a 2.5-liter version (XD3S), originally producing 90 PS (66 kW) at 4,150 rpm. This version could reach 165 km/h (103 mph) when fitted with the manual transmission. Soon thereafter the engine was upgraded to electronic rather than mechanic fuel injection (XD3T), and then produced 95 PS (70 kW) at the same engine speed. USA and Canadian market turbodiesels mostly were delivered with a three-speed ZF automatic gearbox, which was optional elsewhere - but some five speeds were sold in Canada and the USA. Thus equipped, top speed dropped to 158 km/h (98 mph).

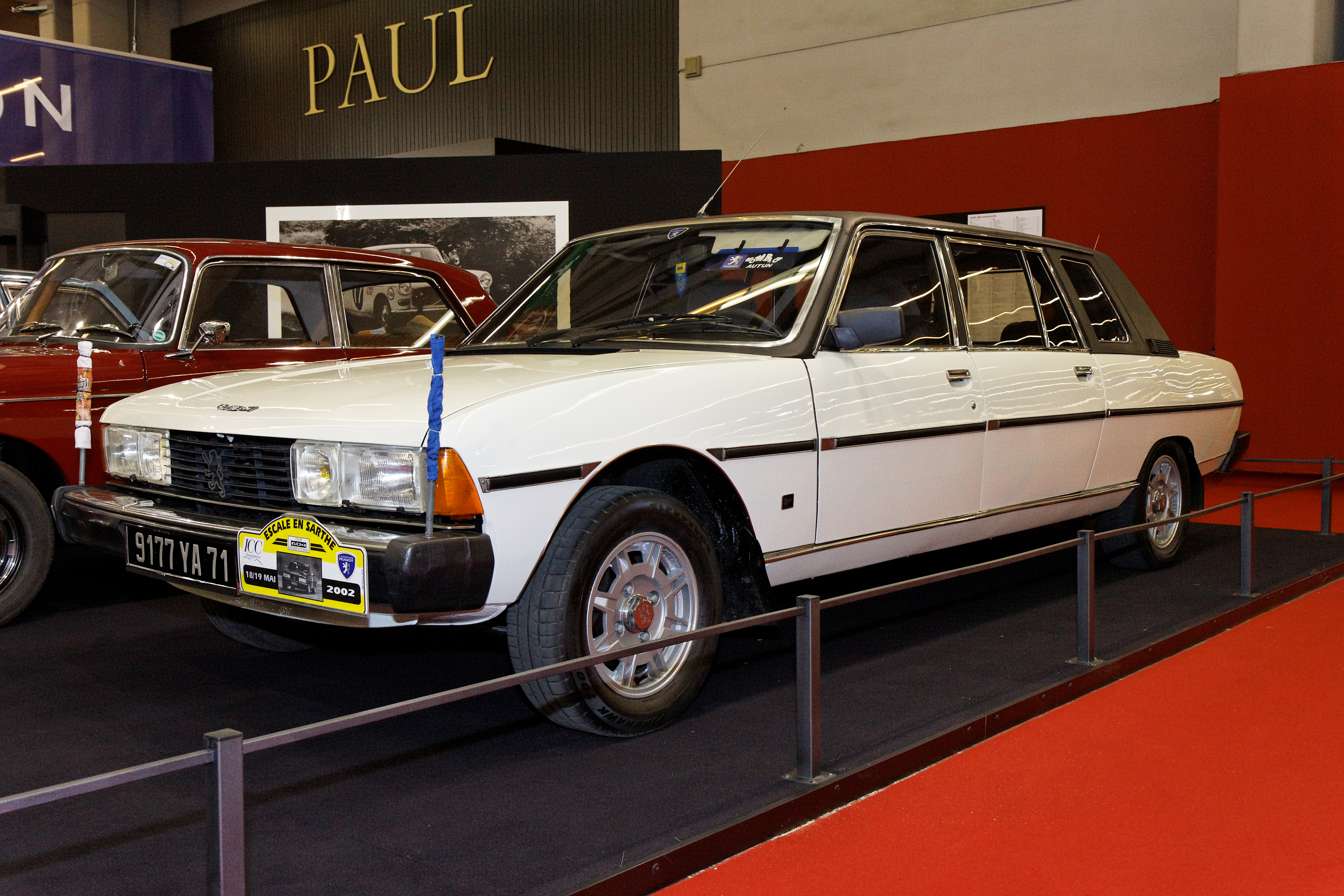
1982 Peugeot 604 GRDT Limousine Heuliez

Autocar's Edward Eves conducted a long-term test of the turbodiesel in 1981. The test concluded that the "604D Turbo is a fine, friendly type of car which really begs to be used. This can be seen in the way the mileage is being built up with it at the rate of 24,000 miles in the year". The overall fuel consumption was estimated at 32.5 miles per gallon (8.7 liters/100 km). The author noted that while the car was not intended as a high-performance vehicle, "it is a very practical vehicle for experienced drivers and is capable of very high point-to-point averages once the technique of driving on the torque curve is mastered". It was also described as "an effortless long-distance car and should be considered by anyone whose motoring is of the order of 30,000 miles a year because this is one of the longest-legged of cars...that I have met". Regarding the diesel engine start-up procedure, the author described it as "remarkably like firing up a petrol engined model". Accommodation inside the car was viewed as being "fully up to international standards for a four-five seater touring saloon with room in the rear seat for two people to travel long-distances in real comfort". The velour seats were praised for their comfort but were viewed as being vulnerable to burns and soiling. Autocar noted that the map pockets in the doors were insufficiently deep and during the test the speedometer cable failed and the foil insert from the rubbing strip on a door detached.

=== Heuliez Limousine ===
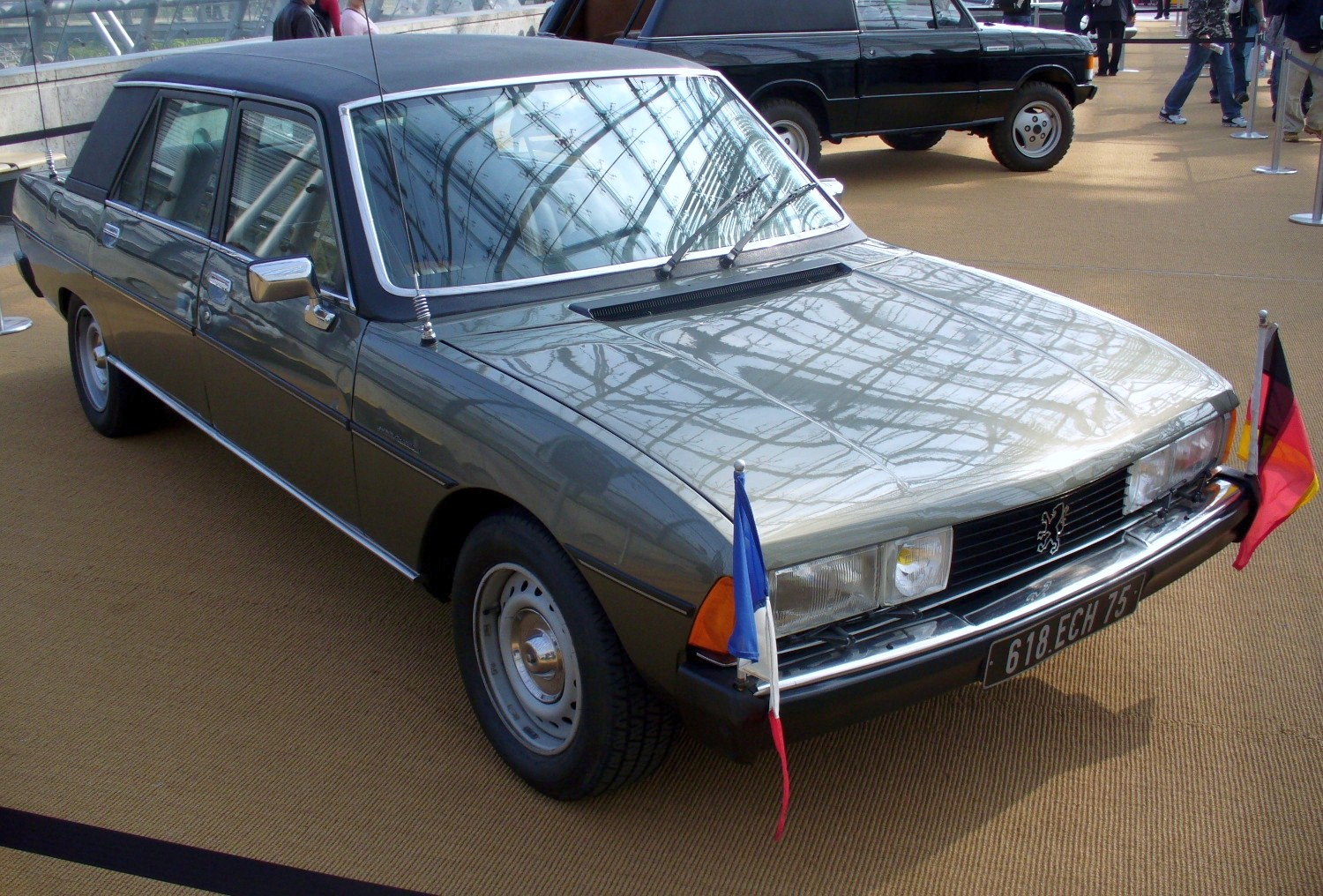
Limousine of French President Valéry Giscard d'Estaing

The French company Heuliez produced 124 long wheelbase limousine versions of the 604. Available in these versions were two extra movable seats. The limousines were produced from 1978 to 1984.

== The boot volume controversy ==
Persistent disagreement existed over the actual luggage capacity of the Peugeot 604, with figures ranging from 356 litres to 501 litres. Peugeot's official claim was that boot capacity was 498 litres. In between these measures, the following figures were also quoted in period reviews: 385 litres, 402 litres, 413 litres and 462 litres. In their 1976 test Motor described the boot as "only average", their testers having been able to fit 356 litres of "Revelation" luggage. However, in 1975 Autocar described the boot as "really capacious," accommodating 699 litres. This figure was "just a little more than the luggage area of the current 504 Family Estate". Autocar's 1977 long-term test of the SL model commented that as well as the cabin being able to accommodate "up to five people, the boot was "one of the largest [the author] could remember, even with the big spare wheel strapped upright on the right hand side. The beauty of the boot is its depth...it has always seemed to me that a really deep boot stood a much better chance of swallowing awkward loads, and the 604 amply proved the point". In Feb 1980 What Car? described the boot as "simply vast". Edward Eves conducted a long-term test of the turbodiesel version for Autocar in 1981. He described the boot as "huge, with four feet of useable width and 33 inches of fore and aft room. As it is, there is ample room for the effects of a family four on a touring holiday" In 1982 Autocar described the boot as "vast". Autocar went on to add that the boot was "not only long, fore and aft, but wide and deep so that full-size suitcases can be packed upright". During the course of the car's road test career the matter was never definitively settled.

== Critical appraisal ==
British motoring journals viewed the 604 favorably upon its initial launch in the UK market, though Motor dissented, viewing the car as generally being a "middle of the road" product. Later commentary noted that its "excellence [was] widely acknowledged". Throughout its career it was rated above all for its ride quality which Car magazine described as being superior to the 1980 Mercedes S-Class W-126 and the equal of Jaguar. Motor magazine viewed the car's ride as being the equal of Jaguars and large Citroëns. As a classic car, the 604 has acquired the lasting image of being "forgotten" and for being less successful than Peugeot hoped, but it is also noted for its "outstanding" ride and accurate, communicative steering.

In August 1975 Car magazine presented an initial review of the 604 and described it as "such a carefully conceived and thoroughly developed car that one can´t help be utterly impressed". Criticisms concerned the weak airflow from certain vents, the slight lack of lumbar and lateral support from the front seats, brake fade, and the lack of central locking. Car praised the refinement of the suspension and the smoothness of the engine which was "an exceptionally flexible unit that has the ability to rev to dizzy heights without uttering the slightest complaint at either extremity". The article concluded that "the Jaguar XJ6, the BMW 525/528, the Fiat 130, Mercedes 280E and Volvo 264 GL are going to have to close ranks against a formidable new intruder".

In November 1975 Car magazine tested the 604 against the BMW 528 and Jaguar XJ 3.4. The test concluded the 604 was faster at cornering than the BMW 528 and was quieter and more comfortable. Car viewed the 604's roadholding the equal of the Jaguar in the dry and superior in wet conditions and, as a limousine, was more successful than the Jaguar. Car concluded that "the Jaguar is still a brilliant car, but in some respects Peugeot have managed to better it. And that takes some doing".

The UK's Motor weekly tested the 604 SL with four-speed manual transmission. The article described the car's styling as both "subtle" and "discreet" with "superb ride, sumptuous and comfortable interior, vary spacious in the back" but the car was let down by its "lack of refinement". The performance was called "lively" but "lacked power below 2,500 rpm", though from 2,500 it "pulled lustily and smoothly up to 6,000 rpm". Detail criticism was focused on the ergonomics (awkward window switch placement, poor driver's seat adjustment, "fussy" speedometer markings), mediocre fuel consumption, and some minor assembly faults. The luggage capacity was described as average (12.6 cubic ft/357 litres). Comparatively, the more expensive Jaguar XJ6 3.4 was rated more highly for its ride and noise suppression while the BMW 520i was judged to be more sporting though overpriced. Motor described the Peugeot as being somewhere between the two.

The Peugeot 604 went on sale in the US market in April, 1977. The US magazine Motor Trend described the rack-and-pinion steering as being "of surpassing excellence and must be experienced to be appreciated" in a review of the 604 SL. Turning to the suspension, Motor Trend wrote that "springing is soft with a great deal of wheel travel. Movement is damped in jounce and particularly rebound in the manner that only the French, and perhaps BMW, seem to be able to achieve". Despite the comfortable ride, the handling remained secure. The car "leans a bit but clings like a limpet in both fast and slow curves". Braking was described as "excellent", having a decelerating g-force of 0.875. The only weak area was performance, the 604 "not coming up the standards of excellence set by ride, handling and stopping ability". The review added that "acceleration and speed are adequate to keep from being overrun by other traffic but by no means can performance be considered brilliant". This was countered by the car's ability to maintain high average speeds on account of its capacity to cope with "twisting, poorly surfaced roads". Overall, given the car's remit as a luxury saloon, Motor Trend viewed this performance limitation as being of secondary importance. In conclusion, Motor Trend viewed the 604 as being "competitively priced" and offering buyers "a new choice, a new arrangement of priorities...if comfort, quality and security are high on the priority list, that fact alone has to make the Peugeot 604 a bit of a bargain".

In November 1977 the UK's respected Car magazine ranked the 604 first in its Giant Test of the Peugeot, BMW 728 and Mercedes 280E. Autocar's long-term test in 1977 of the 604 SL concluded it was very refined, let down mainly by the design of the front seats and minor mechanical defects. In the following year, Car compared the fuel-injected 604 Ti with the Lancia Gamma and Rover 2600 and declared the Peugeot the best car out of the trio: "So strong is its appeal [...]that even the problems some of our team have with the driving position can´t turn us away from it, enhanced as it now is by the extra silkiness that the fuel injection brought, and the greater quietness when cruising that the five-speed transmission allows".

In 1980, What Car? tested the 604 Ti against the newly introduced Vauxhall Royale, the Ford Granada 2.8 Ghia 'S', and Renault 30 TX. Whilst the Peugeot received commendation for its ride ("outstandingly good"), "superb" headlamp performance, the comfort of the rear passenger compartment and the generously sized boot, it lost out to the Royale which was viewed as a more rounded overall design. The Peugeot's driving position, and in particular the design of the seat-runners and cushion, were singled out for particular criticism. Of the four cars, the Peugeot 604 Ti had the highest top speed (119 mph), best 0-60 performance (9.7 seconds) and best fuel consumption figures. It was also the lowest priced of the four cars (9,258 GBP versus the 10,018 GBP for the Ford, 9,771 GBP for the Vauxhall and 9,430 GBP for the Renault).

Autocar magazine carried out a long-term, 36,000-mile, test of the Peugeot 604D turbo. The review concluded saying "This was one car we would dearly have loved to have kept in the family. It offers a rare combination of luxury, big car motoring at a very modest cost. And if this were not enough, the standards of ride and handling are difficult to match at any price". The model was chosen by the magazine for testing because it "was the most advanced diesel engined car on the European market" when it was taken onto the magazine's fleet. Overall, the car's main advantages were its comfort for driver and rear passengers, the large boot capacity, low-noise levels and the quality of the steering. The performance "on paper" compared badly to the petrol though was "excellent by diesel car standards."

In April 1983, Car magazine tested the 604 against the newly launched Volvo 760 and Ford Granada 2.8 Ghia X. The reviewers rated the Peugeot's interior space, headlight effectiveness and ride quality as the best of the trio but the "dated and messy interior" counted against it. Its performance and economy were also lagging behind the competitors. However, the authors still noted that, in their view, the 604 was "the best-riding car on sale today".

Classic & Sportscar carried out a dual test of the Peugeot 604 SL four-speed manual with the Lancia Gamma Berlina (though did not rank them). The reviewer described the 604 as being "suave and smooth, always on its way to that ambassador's reception with a glovebox of Ferrero-Rocher." Criticism of the car focused on the "injection moulded dashboard [being] far from pretty" and the "slightly awkward 4-speed gearbox". The tri-choke Solex carburettor arrangement also received a critical commentary, being responsible for leaving the driver "with an impression of a mid-range flat spot" though the car still "surges forward with brisk authority and a smooth lusty hum....".

== Engines ==
- 2.3 L (2,304 cc) XD2S Diesel I4
- 2.5 L (2,498 cc) XD3S/XD3T Diesel I4
- 2.7 L (2,664 cc) PRV V6
- 2.8 L (2,849 cc) PRV V6
