= What Car? =

British motoring magazine

- Cover of the December 2024 issue
- Editor: Steve Huntingford
- Former editors: Jim Holder; Chas Hallett; Steve Fowler; Rob Aherne; Mark Payton; Richard Feast
- Categories: Car buyer's guide
- Frequency: Monthly
- Circulation: 55,459 (Jan–Dec 2017)
- Publisher: Haymarket Consumer Media
- First issue: November 1973
- Company: Haymarket Media Group
- Country: United Kingdom
- Based in: Twickenham, London, England
- Language: English
- Website: www.whatcar.com
- ISSN: 0307-2991

What Car? is a British monthly automobile magazine and website, currently edited by Steve Huntingford and published by Haymarket Media Group. Other team members include deputy editor Darren Moss, reviews editor Will Nightingale, new cars editor Lawrence Cheung, used cars editor Mark Pearson and consumer editor Claire Evans.

== History ==
Cover of the July 2001 issue, showing previous logo and design.

First published in November 1973, What Car? is intended primarily as a magazine for car buyers rather than dedicated enthusiasts. In addition to first drives and group tests of the latest models, it contains an extensive buyer's guide section to help consumers choose the right car for their needs and provides tips on how to get discounts on cars.

In 1978, the magazine held its first Car of the Year Awards, giving advice on the best models to buy, and this has since been an annual – and eagerly awaited – feature. In 1996, the website www.whatcar.com was launched. More recently, What Car? launched another print edition in 2006, published in India every two months, which subsequently became a monthly publication.

What Car? was featured in the 2018 movie Early Man, though under the name What Chariot?.

== Car of the Year ==
Every year in January, What Car? hosts an awards ceremony, where it names the best cars in each sector of the car market, and an overall Car of the Year, with the Renault 20 receiving the inaugural award in 1978. In 1985, the Volkswagen Golf, in its second generation, became the first model to receive the award twice, having previously won it for the facelifted first generation car in 1981.

As of 2023, Volkswagen is the most successful brand in the history of the awards, having taken the top prize a total of seven times. Members of the Volkswagen Group, such as Audi, SEAT, and Škoda, have won it a further six times between them. Pure-electric cars have won the award four times.

As of 2023, the What Car? Car of the Year Awards are sponsored by MotorEasy.

- 1978 Renault 20
- 1979 Peugeot 305
- 1980 Vauxhall Astra
- 1981 Volkswagen Golf
- 1982 Mercedes-Benz 200T
- 1983 MG Metro
- 1984 Peugeot 205
- 1985 Volkswagen Golf
- 1986 Saab 9000
- 1987 Renault 21
- 1988 BMW 735i
- 1989 Ford Fiesta
- 1990 Rover 214 Si
- 1991 Rover Metro
- 1992 Volkswagen Golf
- 1993 Ford Mondeo
- 1994 Peugeot 306
- 1995 Volkswagen Polo
- 1996 Peugeot 406
- 1997 Renault Scénic
- 1998 Land Rover Freelander
- 1999 Rover 75
- 2000 Škoda Fabia
- 2001 Ford Mondeo
- 2002 Toyota Corolla
- 2003 SEAT Ibiza
- 2004 Volkswagen Golf
- 2005 Land Rover Discovery
- 2006 BMW 320d
- 2007 Vauxhall Corsa
- 2008 Jaguar XF
- 2009 Ford Fiesta
- 2010 Peugeot 3008
- 2011 Audi A1
- 2012 Volkswagen Up
- 2013 Audi A3
- 2014 Nissan Qashqai
- 2015 Škoda Fabia
- 2016 Audi A4
- 2017 BMW 5 Series
- 2018 Volvo XC40
- 2019 Kia e-Niro
- 2020 Ford Puma
- 2021 Dacia Sandero (award later rescinded due to two-star NCAP rating)
- 2022 Kia EV6
- 2023 Volkswagen ID Buzz
- 2024 Lexus LBX
- 2025 Renault 5 E-Tech

== Real MPG ==
In April 2012, What Car? launched a service called 'True MPG', which was rebranded 'Real MPG' in 2023. It claims gives consumers an idea of what they can really expect from a car if they drive it gently and stick to speed limits, but don't resort to any unrealistically slow acceleration or special hypermiling techniques. These True MPG figures are published alongside the official government fuel economy data, that car manufacturers are legally obliged to include in brochures.

== What Car? Approved Used ==
In June 2012, What Car? launched an online car buying service called 'What Car Approved Used', which it claimed provides "peace of mind" to car buyers, by endorsing the "10 Points of Difference" promoted by the National Franchised Dealers Association.

The agreement came to a close in July 2015, and What Car? began to carry listings from other sources, dropping the 'Approved Used' branding.

== New Car Buyer Marketplace ==
In October 2016, What Car? launched a new online car buying service called 'New Car Buyer Marketplace'. Built into the existing whatcar.com website, it lets readers buy discounted cars from dealers in their area who have signed up to a What Car? code of conduct.

What Car?'s 'Target Price' is displayed alongside the dealer price so users can check whether a deal represents good value.

In 2024, the platform was replaced by a partnership with Auto Trader, providing links to help motorists buy new, nearly-new and used cars, or to lease a new car.

== Video reviews ==
What Car? publishes new videos every week. These are mainly reviews of new cars, but also include road trip features and previews of forthcoming models. Doug Revolta is What Car?’s lead presenter and Head of Video and Will Nightingale, also makes regular appearances.

The videos are published on What Car?’s YouTube channel, and across its website, whatcar.com. As of March 2025, What Car? Has 528,000 YouTube subscribers.

What Car? publishes more video content across its social media channels, which include X, Facebook, Instagram and Tiktok. As of March 2025, it has a combined audience of more than 150,000.
