= Renault Alpine GTA/A610 =

The Renault Alpine GTA and the succeeding A610 is a sports coupé automobile produced by the Renault-owned French manufacturer Alpine between late 1984 and 1995. The GTA name was an internal code name (although it was used as a model name in the British market); in Europe it was sold as the Alpine V6 GT or V6 Turbo. It replaced the slow-selling Alpine A310, with which it shared many features, including the layout and engine. The GTA was replaced by the A610 in 1991.

== Alpine GTA ==
Renault Alpine GTA
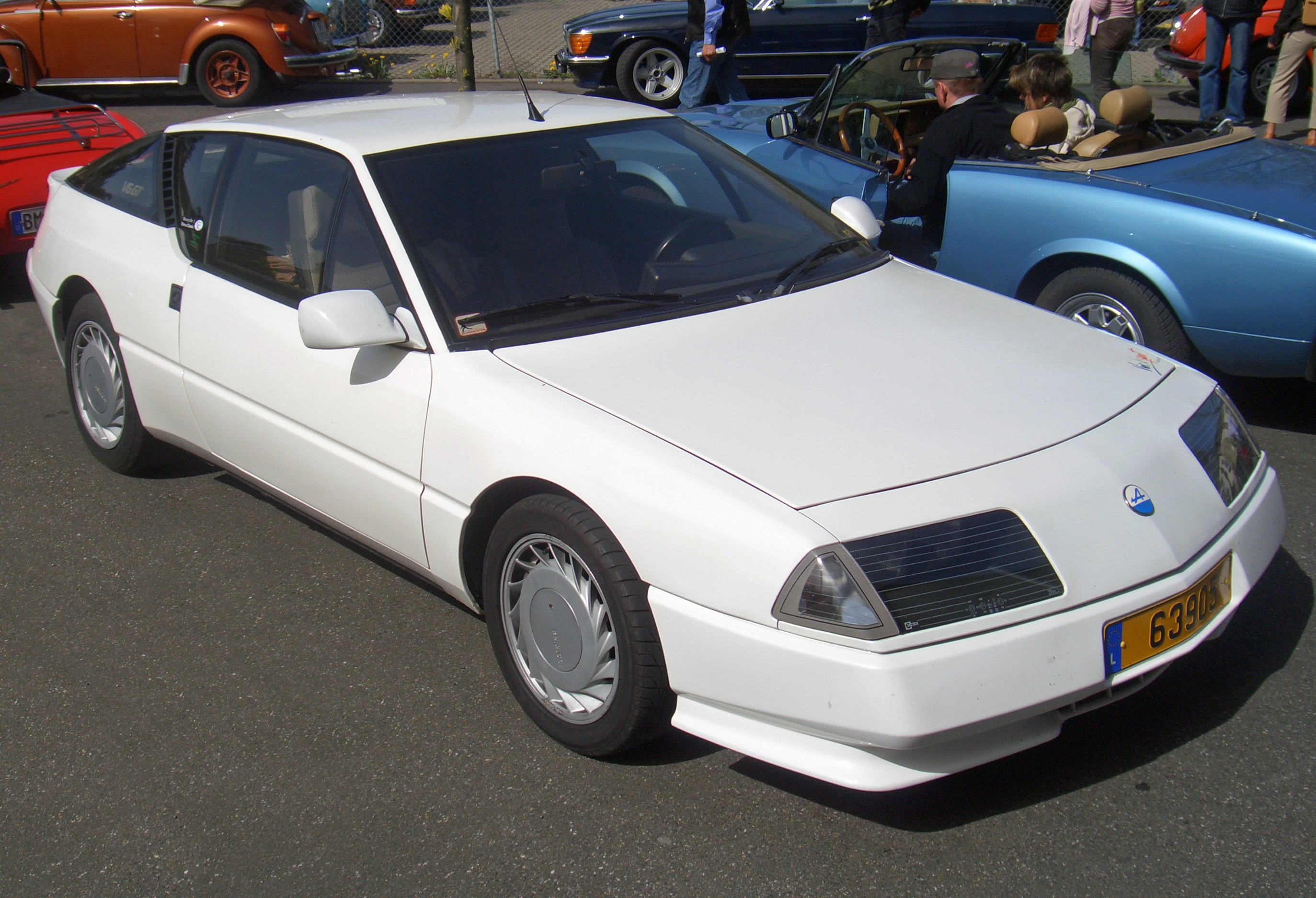

Overview
- Manufacturer: Renault Alpine
- Also called: Renault Alpine V6 GT; Renault Alpine V6 Turbo; Renault GTA (UK)
- Production: November 1984 – February 1991
- Assembly: Dieppe, France
- Designer: Yves Legal

Body and chassis
- Class: Sports car
- Body style: 2+2, 2-door coupé
- Layout: RR layout

Powertrain
- Engine: 2.5L (2458 cc) PRV Z7U turbo V6; 2.9L (2849 cc) PRV Z7W V6

Dimensions
- Wheelbase: 2,340 mm (92.1 in)
- Length: 4,330 mm (170.5 in)
- Width: 1,750 mm (68.9 in)
- Height: 1,200 mm (47.2 in)

Chronology
- Predecessor: Alpine A310
- Successor: Alpine A610

The Grand Tourisme Alpine (or GTA) is a sports car produced by the French manufacturer Alpine, launched in 1985. It is the successor to the Alpine A310, and the first Alpine produced 100% by Renault.

It was the first car launched by Alpine under Renault ownership (though Alpine had been affiliated with Renault for many years, with its earlier models using many Renault parts). Longer, wider, and taller, it effectively updated the design of its predecessor, the Alpine A310, updating that car's silhouette with modern design features like body-integrated bumpers and a triangular C-pillar with the large rear windshield. Like its predecessor, it used the V6 PRV engine in a rear-engined layout, with extensive use of Polyester plastics and fibreglass for the body panels making it lighter and quicker than rivals such as the Porsche 944. Passenger room increased, making the rear seat more useful, while equipment was much more complete and now included items such as power locks. It was one of the most aerodynamic cars of its time, and the naturally aspirated version achieved a record 0.28 drag coefficient in its class. Due to its bigger tires and need for more cooling intakes, the Turbo's drag coefficient was a bit higher: 0.30 $\scriptstyle C_\mathrm x\,$. The GTA name, used to denote the entire range of this generation, stands for "Grand Tourisme Alpine," but in most markets, the car was marketed as the Renault Alpine V6 GT or as the Renault Alpine V6 Turbo. In Great Britain, it was sold simply as the Renault GTA, as Sunbeam (and then Chrysler/Talbot) had been using the "Alpine" badge since the 1950s.

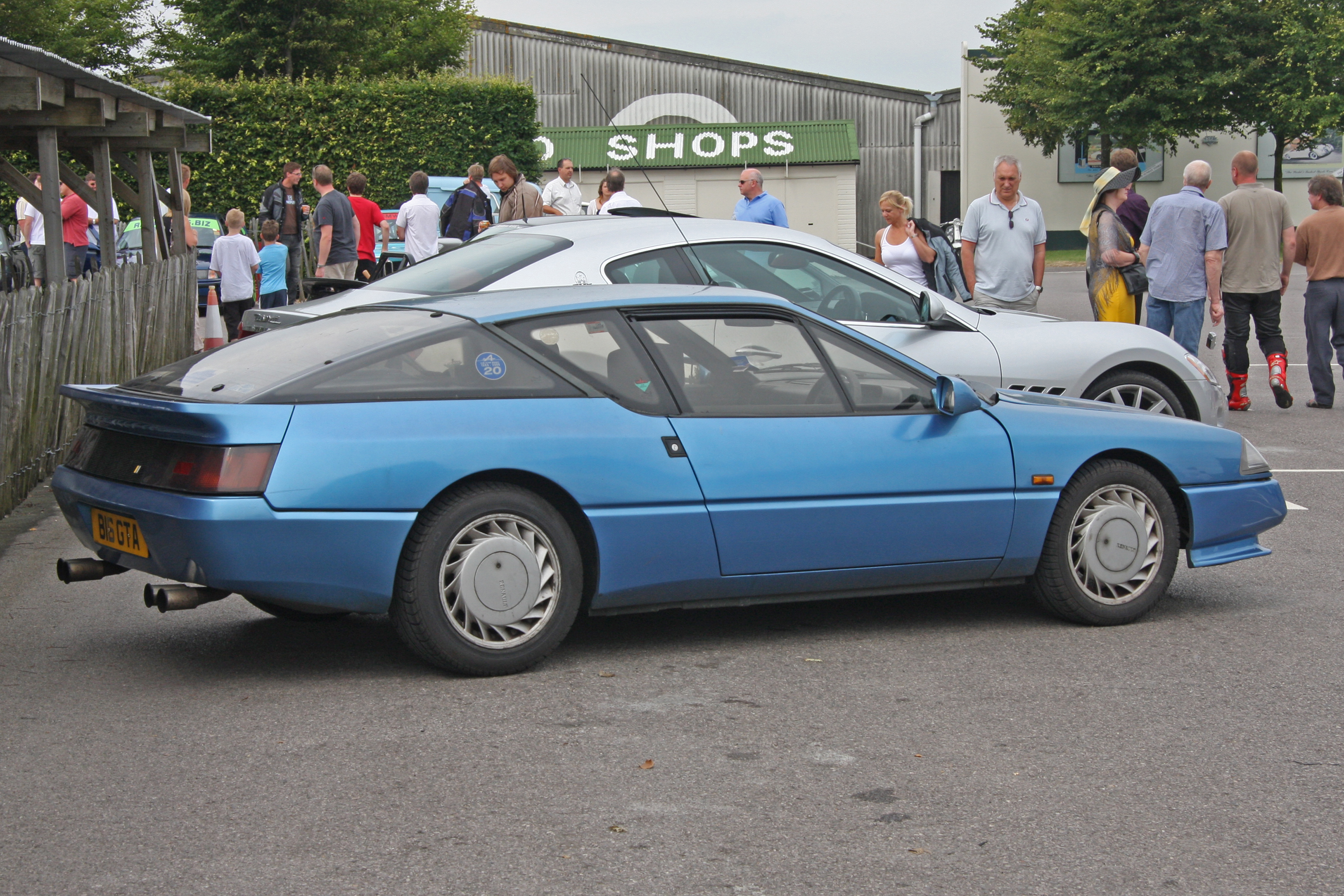
1988 Renault GTA Turbo (UK)

Rather than being molded in a single piece as for the preceding A310, the new Alpine's body was molded in a large number of small separate panels. This required a significant overhaul of the Alpine plant, leaving only the sandblasting machinery intact. The car was also considerably more efficient to manufacture, with the time necessary to build a finished car dropping from 130 to 77 hours - which was still a long time but acceptable for a small-volume specialty car. The PRV engine in the naturally aspirated model was identical to the version used in the Renault 25, a 2849 cc unit producing 120 kW; 160 hp (160 PS). The small power gain compensated for the weight increase, up by 92 kg (203 lb). Also available was the more powerful turbocharged model, which used a smaller (2.5-liter) displacement.

The central backbone chassis (with outriggers for side impact protection) was built by Heuliez and then transferred to Dieppe. Aside from the body, most of the car was subcontracted to various suppliers. The drivetrain was mounted on a separate subframe, meaning it can be removed in as little as two hours. It was also moved 40 mm (1.6 in) forward (making the rear overhang shorter while nearly all other dimensions increased) compared to the A310, improving somewhat on that car's tailwards weight distribution. The transmission was the same Renault 30-based unit that the A310 had used, with some minor changes and somewhat longer fourth and fifth gears. Those gears were taller than for the GT Turbo model. At the time of introduction, the daily production number amounted to ten cars. This soon dropped considerably, as the somewhat less than prestigious Renault had a hard time in the sports car marketplace. The average production for the six full years was just above 1000 per annum, or just above three per day - almost identical to the A310 V6's annual production.

=== Models ===
Alpine wanted to launch a complete range of models. Three models were announced for public use.

=== V6 GT ===
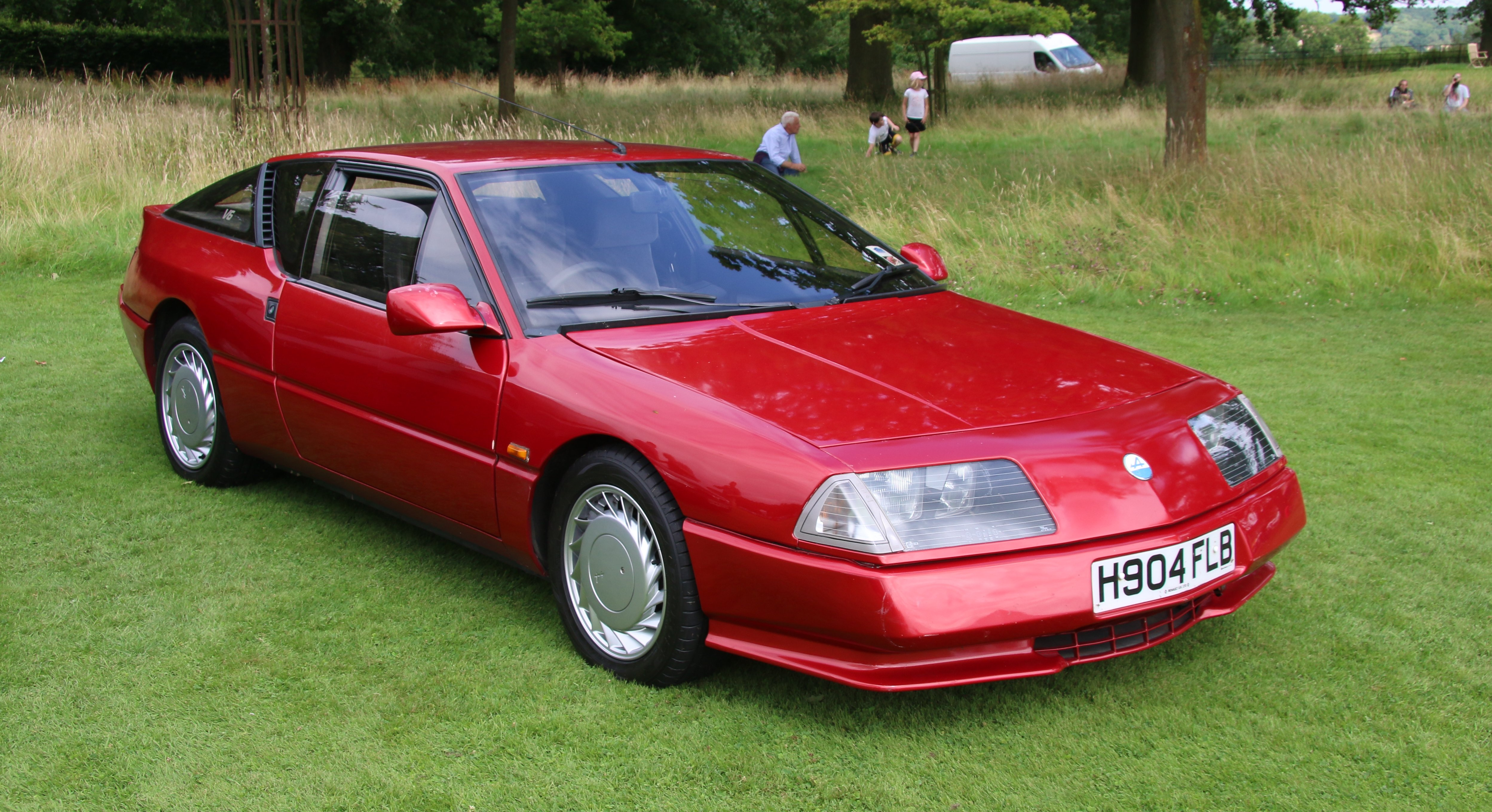
Renault GTA V6 (UK)

Presented in November 1984, it is the base version. With a C_{x} of 0.28, and an SC_{x} of 0.48, the V6 GT set a record for aerodynamics at the time for a car in this category.

The first model introduced was the naturally aspirated V6 GT (D 500), which entered production in November 1984, although press photos had been released in September 1984. The car was first shown at the 1985 Amsterdam Rai, immediately after which it also went on sale.

=== Europa Cup model ===
The Europa Cup was initially rolled out in July 1985. The model was conceived for racing during the Formula 1 Grand Prix in Europe, hence its name. Of the 69 cars manufactured between 1984 and 1987, it is estimated that only seven remain in the "civilian" version. All cars left the production lines of the Alpine factory in Dieppe with their registration certificate, but to recover the VAT, some Europa Cups no longer carry the proper paperwork for registration.

In July 1985, the Europa Cup model appeared; this limited-edition model was intended for a single-make racing championship, and 69 cars were built (54 in 1985 and 15 more in 1987).

=== V6 Turbo ===
The Alpine V6 Turbo model (D 501) was introduced in September 1985. With a larger rear spoiler grille to improve cooling. The C_{x} increases from 0.28 to 0.30. Like the Renault 25 V6 Turbo, the GTA uses the 2458 cc V6 PRV turbocharged engine producing 150 kW; 200 hp (200 PS) at 5750 rpm and 290 N⋅m (214 lb⋅ft) of torque at 2500 rpm. This gave it a 0–97 km/h (0–60 mph) time of 6.3 seconds and a top speed of 240 km/h (149 mph) as tested by Autocar.

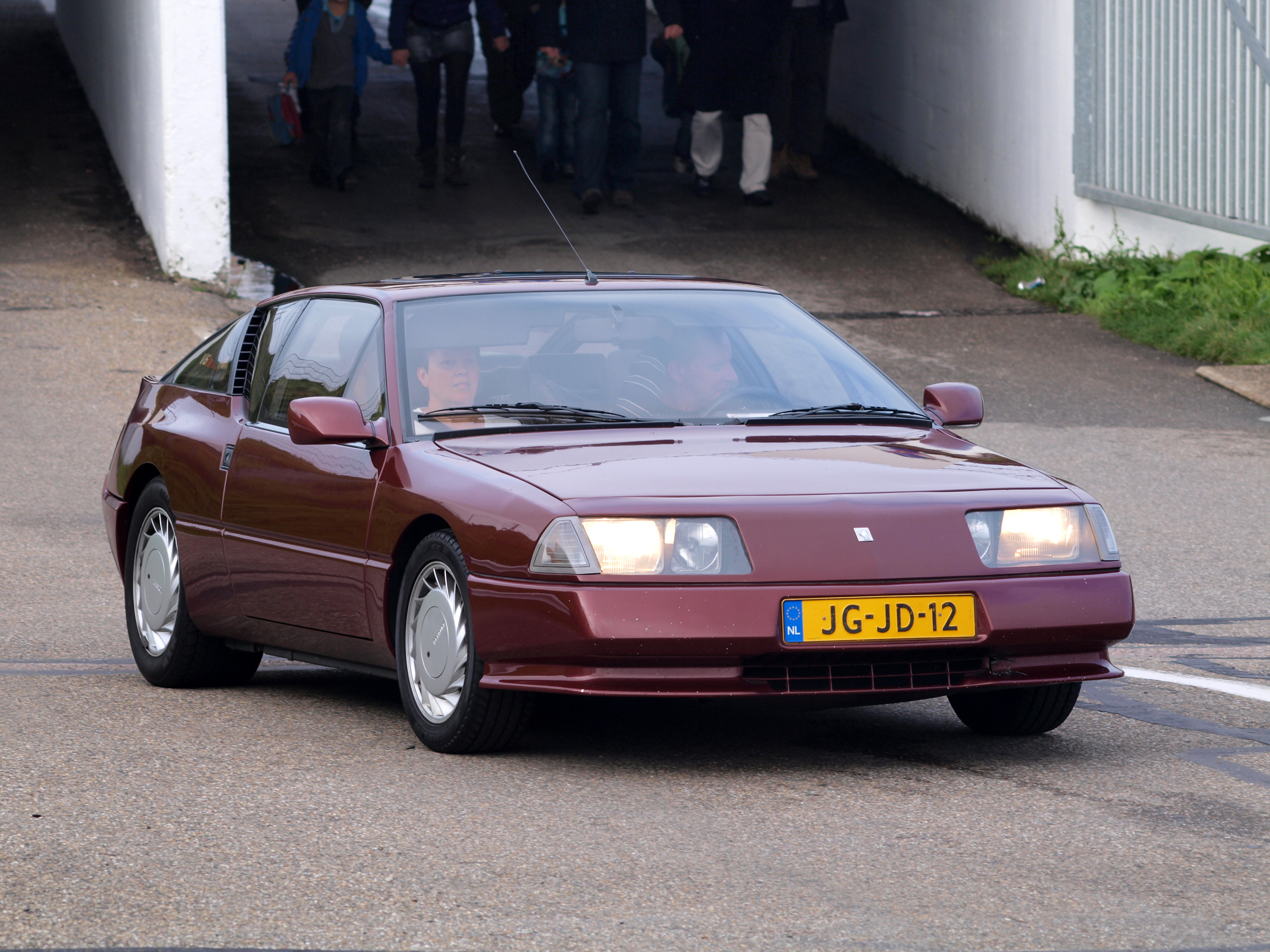
Alpine V6 GT Turbo in Rouge Titien

Sales of the naturally aspirated model were always sluggish, but with the more powerful turbo, things picked up considerably. At the 1986 Birmingham Show, the right-hand-drive version was presented and UK sales, as the Renault GTA, commenced.

In early 1987 a catalyzed version appeared, with 11 kW (15 hp) less power. This meant that the Turbo could finally be sold in Switzerland and later in other European countries such as Germany and the Netherlands when they adopted stricter legislation. The catalyzed model had lower gearing in the fourth and fifth gears to mask its power deficit. In 1988 anti-lock brakes became available. For the 1989 model year the Mille Miles version appeared. With the non-catalyzed engine, this model heralded a re-focus on the Alpine name. The Renault logo was gone from the car, with an alpine logo up front and a large "Alpine" print appearing between the taillights. However, as the name 'Alpine' could not be used in the UK the name Alpine was removed from cars destined for the UK; there was no large print at the back of these cars and a UK specific logo was fitted to the front of the car. The Mille Miles, a limited edition of 100 cars, also featured a special dark-red metallic paintjob, polished aluminium wheels, and a large silver-gray triangular stripe with the Alpine "A" across the left side of the front.

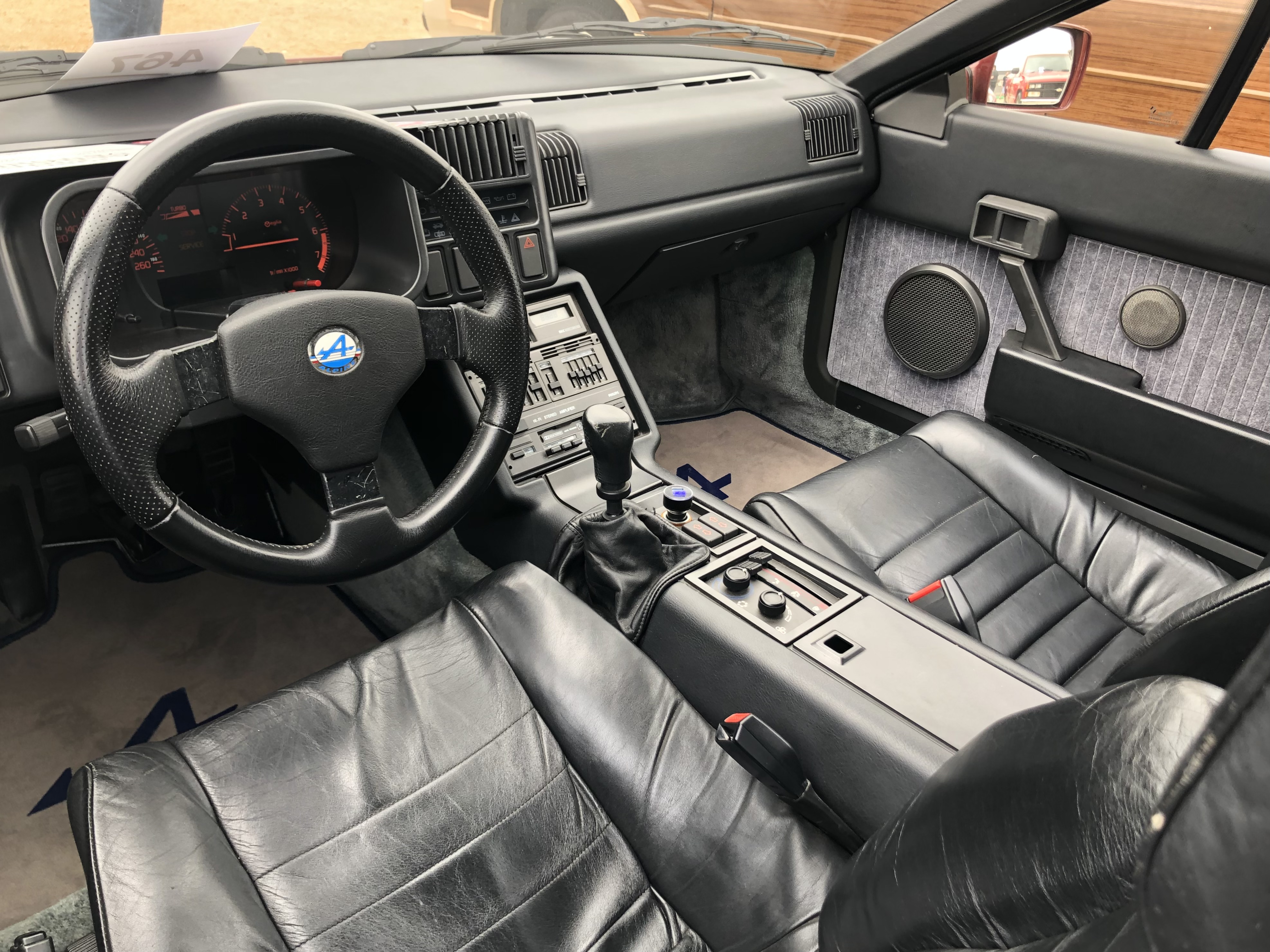
Alpine V6 Turbo interior

In February 1990 the limited edition Le Mans arrived, this car had a more aggressive body kit with polyester wheel arch extensions and a one-piece front with smaller headlights. Wheels were 3-piece BBS-style produced by ACT, 8x16" front & 10x17" rear. Many of these changes were adopted for the succeeding A610. The regular V6 GT and V6 Turbo ended production during 1990, while the Le Mans version continued to be produced until February 1991. 325 of these were built in total. Also in 1990, Renault was forced to install the less powerful catalyzed engine in cars destined for the home market, leading to grumbling amongst Alpine enthusiasts about the loss of power (down to 136 kW (185 PS)) while the 25 Turbo saloon actually gained power when it became catalyzed. In response Danielson SA, a famous French tuner, created an upgraded version of the Le Mans with 154 kW (210 PS).

==== Federalized version ====
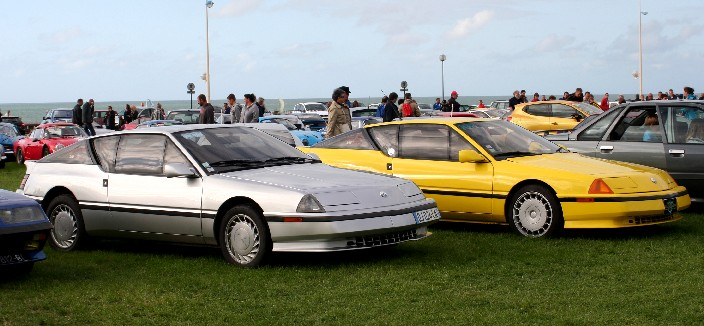
Federalized Renault Alpines in France.

Renault and Alpine quickly considered exporting the GTA to the United States through American Motors, then-partially owned by Renault. A model derived from the V6 Turbo was therefore designed and finalized to adapt to local constraints. In compliance with North American regulations, it lost its front lights under the canopy in favor of retractable optics, its bumpers were more protruding and deformable, and side lights were inserted into the bumpers and integrated into adhesive protections. The front bumper grille was widened to improve cooling. Amber side markers were integrated into the bumper. A third brake light was inserted under the rear spoiler. The GTA USA benefitted from a major redesign of the chassis. The tubes of the front structure were replaced by pressed sheet metal. Energy dampers for the shields were added. The sides were reinforced with bars in the doors and doubled side reinforcements. Many of the developments made for the GTA USA chassis were reused on the A610.

Renault had planned a federalized version of the Alpine V6 Turbo, originally for the 1986 model year, but development proceeded slowly. The US model had an engine with emissions controls 130 kW; 180 PS (180 hp), bigger bumpers, and flip-up headlamps. Various crash safety improvements were also carried out, and it was planned to install softer suspension. AMC/Renault was planning a mid-1987 introduction, hoping to sell 3,000 Alpines per year (with an additional 300 cars slated for Canada). In March 1987, however, Renault sold its share in American Motors to Chrysler and began to withdraw from the American and Canadian markets. Commentators had already expressed concern about AMC dealers being able to handle such an expensive and complicated car. By the time of the withdrawal, 21 pre-series cars had been finished. Twelve of these were sold by Alpine directly to specially selected customers in France.

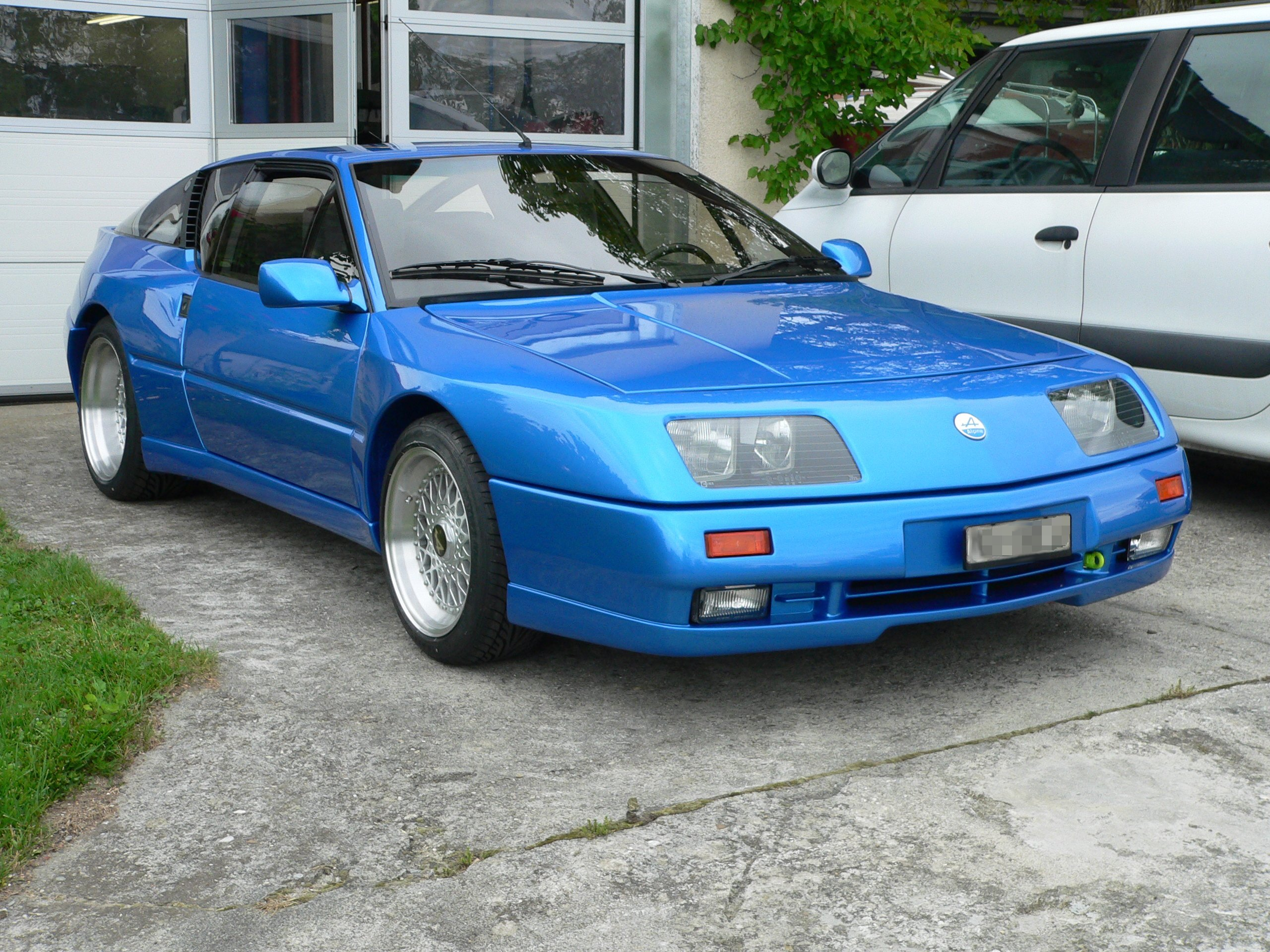
Renault Alpine Le Mans (1990-1991)

== Limited editions ==
=== Le Mans ===
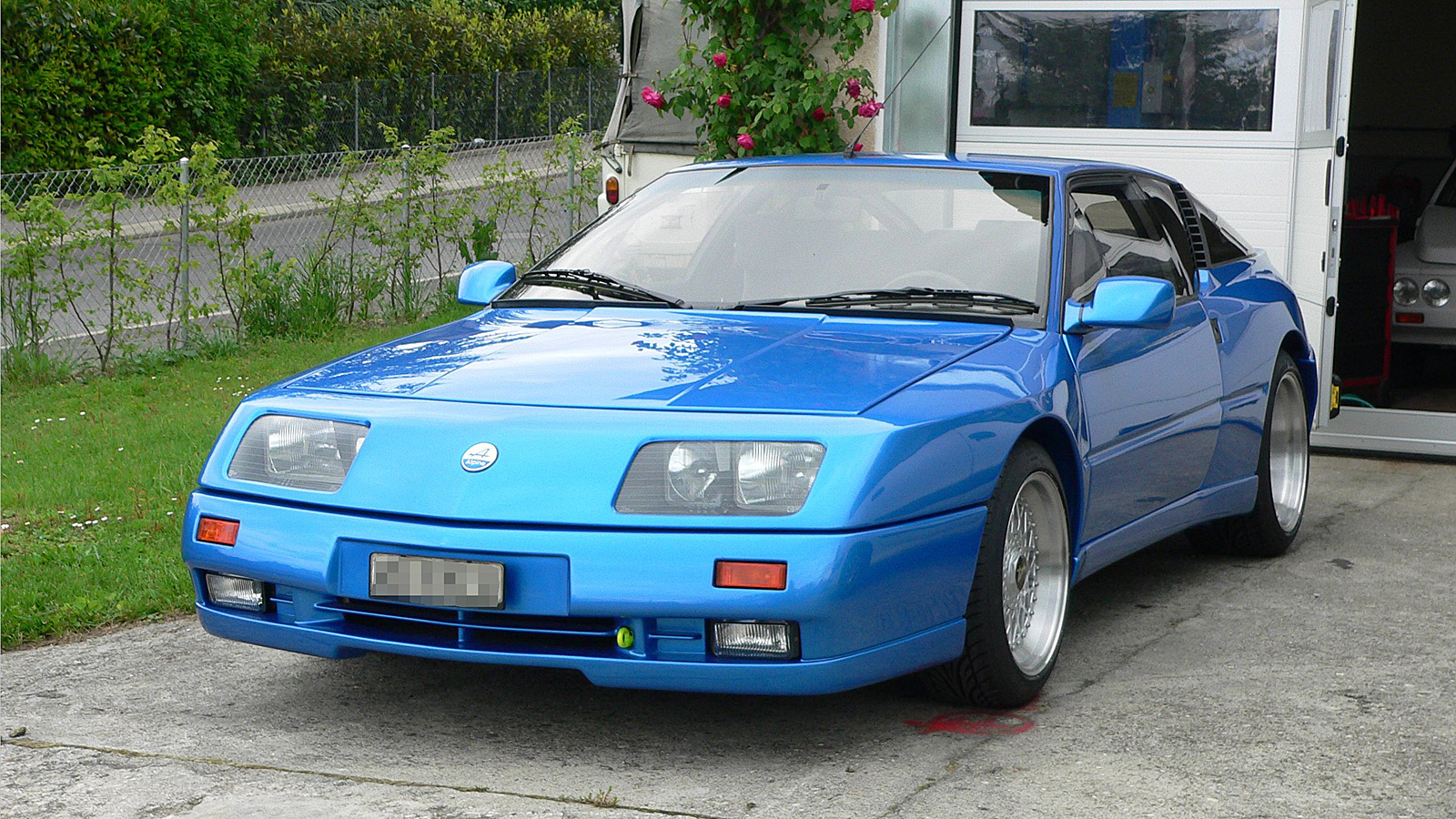
Alpine Le Mans

The Le Mans was released in February 1990, with a plan of building 300 units. 325 were built until February 1991. It used the catalyzed V6 Turbo engine, with power dropping from 200 to 185 PS. It was equipped with a body kit derived from the one proposed by a German tuner. The fenders were widened, and the front turn signals migrated from the fender tips to the bumper. The fenders and front mask were formed in one piece and rocker panels were added. It has specific ACT wheels "BBS style" with a false central nut. Only three colours were offered: Alpine Blue (No. 488), Imperial Red (No. 570) and Beetle Green (No. 592). This body kit led directly to the style of its successor, the A610.

In 1990, Alpine had been obliged by French regulations to clean up its engines. Contrary to the Renault 25 V6 Turbo which saw its power going from 182 to 205 hp, the V6 Turbo of the GTA dropped from 200 to 185 PS because of the various adaptations required to fit it at the rear of the car, in particular for the inclusion of the gearbox. With a totally different engine environment, the engineers could not optimize the GTA's pollution control at a reasonable cost without reducing power. The sales volumes of the Alpine did not allow such investments. Apart from the top speed, which dropped from 250 to 240 km/h (160 to 150 mph), the decrease in performance was considered to be hardly noticeable.

With the help of the Danielson SA company, Alpine developed through their after-sales & service dealers a simple and inexpensive engine modification intended to calm discontented Alpine buyers. The engine management was optimized and the power increased from 185 to 210 PS. The competition group registration was modified accordingly. The Danielson "Le Mans" has almost the same performance as the non-catalyzed V6 Turbo. In acceleration, it can be as fast as a Porsche 911 (964) Carrera 2 or a Ferrari 348 TB (from 100 to 140 km/h (62 to 87 mph) in 9.3 s in fifth gear). This modification cost at the time 16 000 FRF in addition to the 375 000 FRF of the basic car.

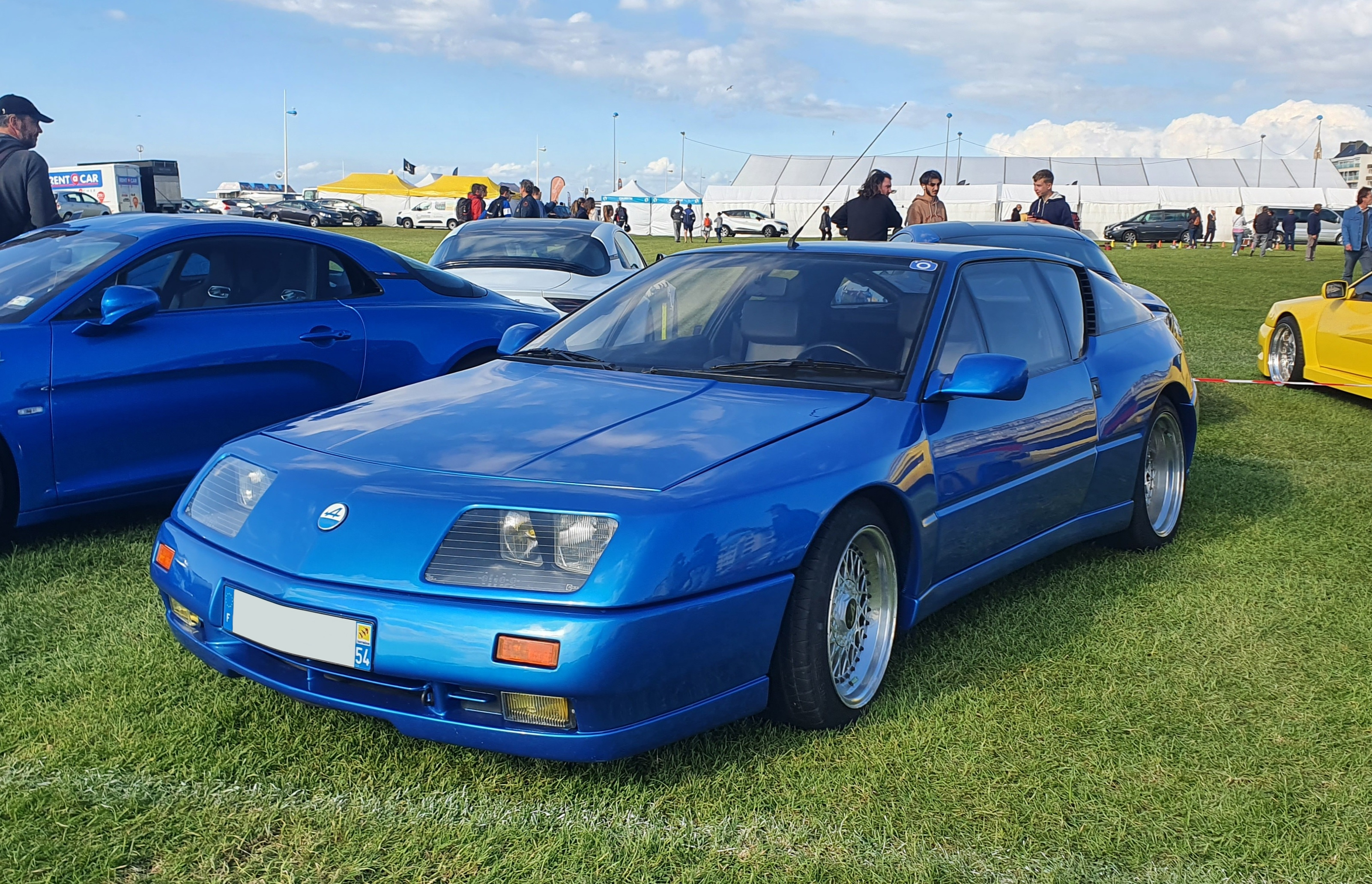
Alpine GTA Le Mans in blue Alpine.

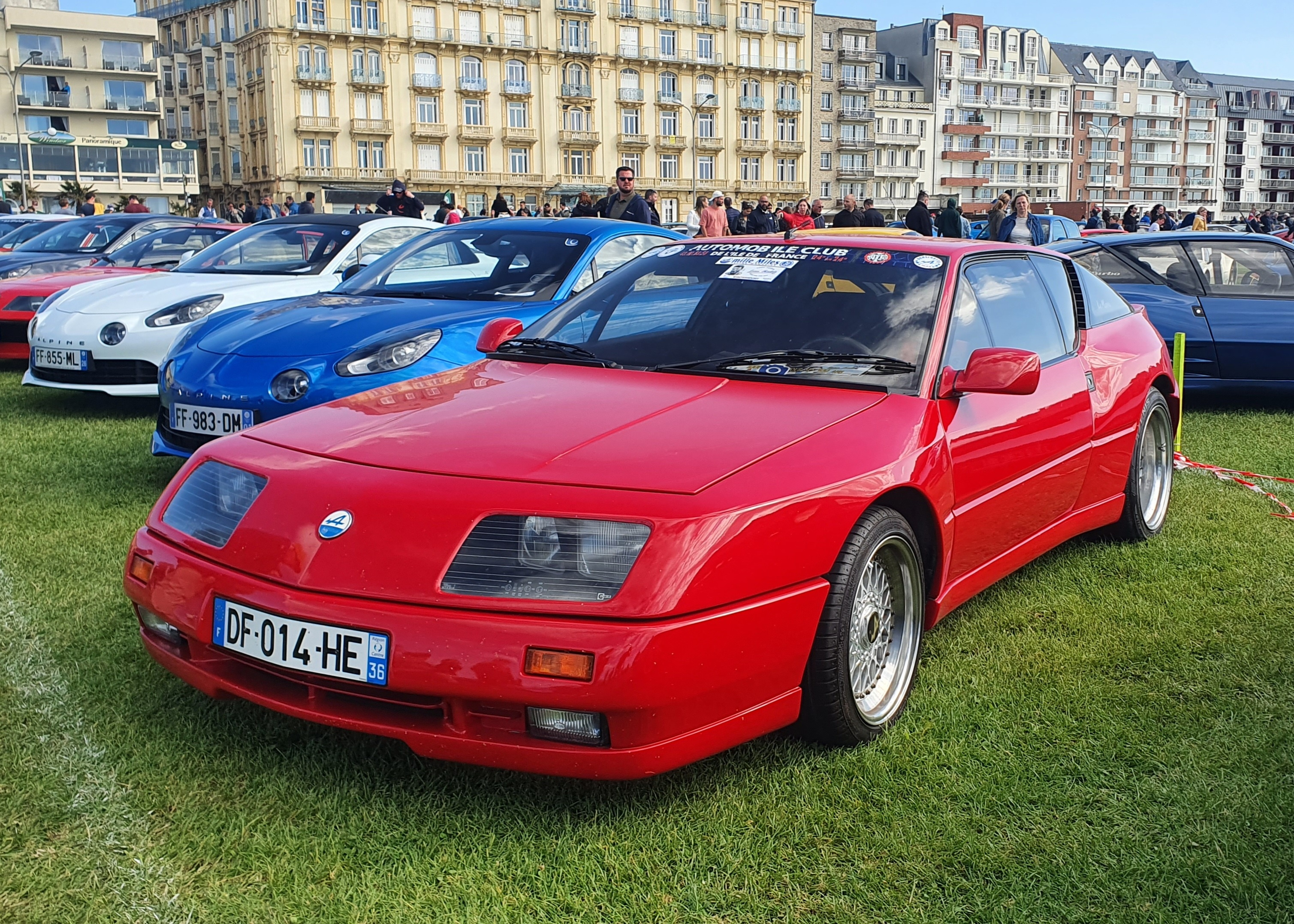
Alpine GTA Le Mans in imperial red.

=== Specifications ===
| Model | V6 GT; D500 05 | V6 Turbo; D501 05 | V6 Turbo; D50 A (USA) | V6 Turbo Cat; D501 05 (CH) | V6 Turbo Cat; D502 05 | V6 Turbo Cat "Le Mans" D502 05 A | V6 Turbo Cat tuning "Le Mans" D502 05 A (Danielson) |
| Engine | PRV V6 | | | | | | |
| Type | Longitudinal | | | | | | |
| Cylinders | 6 cylinders | | | | | | |
| Valves | 12 valves | | | | | | |
| Camshaft | top | | | | | | |
| Engine size | 2849 cc | 2458 cc | | | | | |
| Compression ratio | 9.5 : 1 | 8.6 :1 | 8 : 1 | | | | |
| Max power | 160 PS (118 kW; 158 hp) at 5750 rpm | 200 PS (147 kW; 197 hp) at 5750 rpm | 182 PS (134 kW; 180 hp) at 5900 rpm | 185 PS (136 kW; 182 hp) at 5500 rpm | 185 PS (136 kW; 182 hp) at 5750 rpm | 185 PS (136 kW; 182 hp) at 5750 rpm | 210 PS (154 kW; 207 hp) at 5200 rpm |
| Max torque | 221 N⋅m (163 lb⋅ft) at 3500 rpm | 285 N⋅m (210 lb⋅ft) at 2500 rpm | 276 N⋅m (204 lb⋅ft) at 4000 rpm | 288 N⋅m (212 lb⋅ft) at 2250 rpm | 288 N⋅m (212 lb⋅ft) at 2200 rpm | 288 N⋅m (212 lb⋅ft) at 2200 rpm | 350 N⋅m (260 lb⋅ft) at 2200 rpm |
| Catalytic converter | No | | Yes | | | | |
| Fuel | RON 97 | | RON 95 or 98 unleaded | | | | |
| Carburetor | Carburetor SC 34 + DC 35 | electronic injection | | | | | |
| Air supply | atmospheric | Turbocharged 0.65 bar (9.4 psi) | | Turbocharged 0.70 bar (10.2 psi) | | | Turbocharged 1.0 bar (15 psi) |
| Kilometer start-stop | 28.4 s | 26.8 s | - | - | - | 27.5 s | 26.7 s |
| 0 to 100 km/h | 8.0 s | 7.0 s | - | 7.0 s | 7.0 s | 6.7 s | 5.7 s |
| Max speed | 235 km/h (146 mph) | 250 km/h (160 mph) | - | 238 km/h (148 mph) | 243 km/h (151 mph) | 240 km/h (150 mph) | 247 km/h (153 mph) |
| Consumption 90 km/h 120 km/h Town | 7.0 L/100 km 7.9 L/100 km 14.7 L/100 km | 6.4 L/100 km 8.1 L/100 km 12.8 L/100 km | - - - | - - - | - - - | 7.1 L/100 km 9.0 L/100 km 13.9 L/100 km | 8.3 L/100 km 10.1 L/100 km 13.7 L/100 km |
| Fuel tank | 72 L (15.8 imp gal; 19.0 US gal) | 72 L (15.8 imp gal; 19.0 US gal) + 1 L (0.2 imp gal; 0.3 US gal) | 57 L (12.5 imp gal; 15.1 US gal) | 72 L (15.8 imp gal; 19.0 US gal) + 1 L (0.2 imp gal; 0.3 US gal) | | | |
| Aerodynamic | Cx : 0.28; SCx : 0.48 | Cx : 0.30; SCx : 0.51 | | | | Cx : 0.30; SCx : 0.59 | |

== Alpine A610 ==
Alpine A610
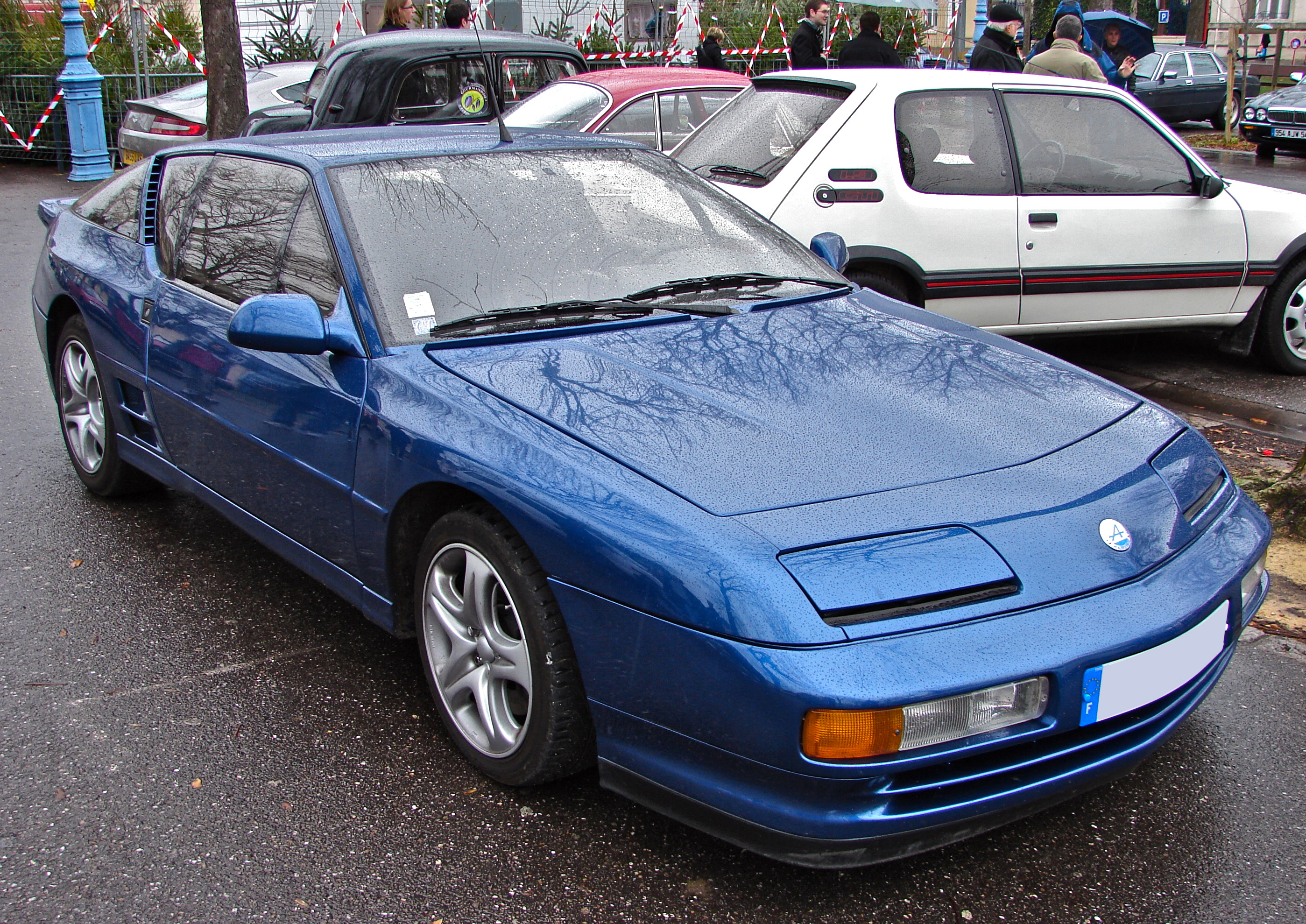

Overview
- Manufacturer: Alpine
- Production: 1991–1995
- Assembly: Dieppe, France
- Designer: Yves Legal

Body and chassis
- Class: Sports car
- Body style: 2+2, 2-door coupe
- Layout: Longitudinally-mounted, rear-engine, rear-wheel-drive

Powertrain
- Engine: 3.0 L PRV turbo V6
- Transmission: 5-speed manual

Dimensions
- Wheelbase: 2,340 mm (92.1 in)
- Length: 4,420 mm (174.0 in)
- Width: 1,762 mm (69.4 in)
- Height: 1,188 mm (46.8 in)

Chronology
- Predecessor: Alpine GTA

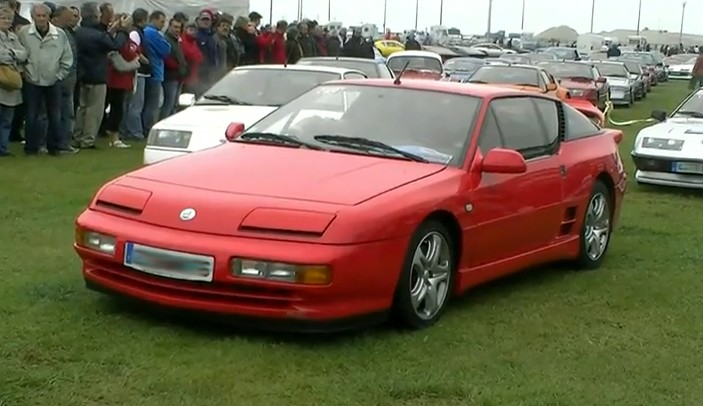
Alpine A610 red

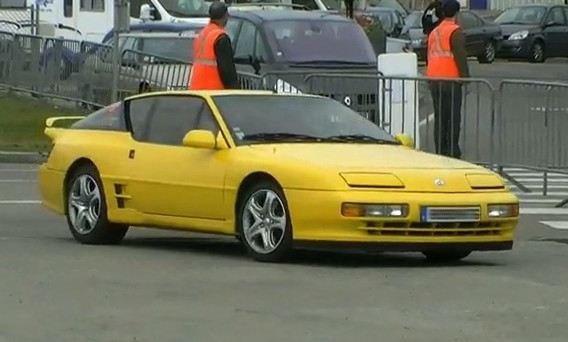
Alpine A610 yellow

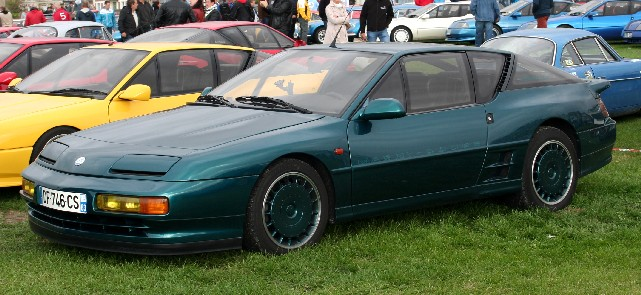
Alpine A610 Magny-Cours

The successor to the Alpine GTA, the Alpine A610 was produced by the Renault-owned French manufacturer Alpine from 1991 to 1995. Due to a limited budget at the beginning of the project, its appearance does not differ much from the GTA, and it looks quite similar to the USA GTA with its pop-up headlights. Nonetheless, it is a completely different car, sharing only the windows with the GTA. The basic concepts of all Alpine cars are there (e.g. the rear engine, and the steel backbone chassis that all Alpines since the A110 have had). The car was solely branded as an Alpine, as linking Alpine and Renault together (first as Alpine-Renault then Renault-Alpine) seemed to detract from the Alpine brand's sporty image. The PRV engine remained, but it was enlarged to 3.0 litres (2,975 cc), which enabled it to produce 184 kW; 247 bhp (250 PS) at 5,750 rpm and 350 N⋅m (258 lbf⋅ft) of torque at 2,900 rpm. As with all PRV engines, the 610's engine was downsized to 2,963 cc (3.0 L; 180.8 cu in) in March 1993 to better fit the Swiss taxation system.

The A610 Albertville 92 was presented in 1991 for the Olympic Games. Two examples, and other Renault cars, were used to drive VIPs, before being sold. They had a specific color (Gardenia White) and interior, but used the standard engine and technical specifications.

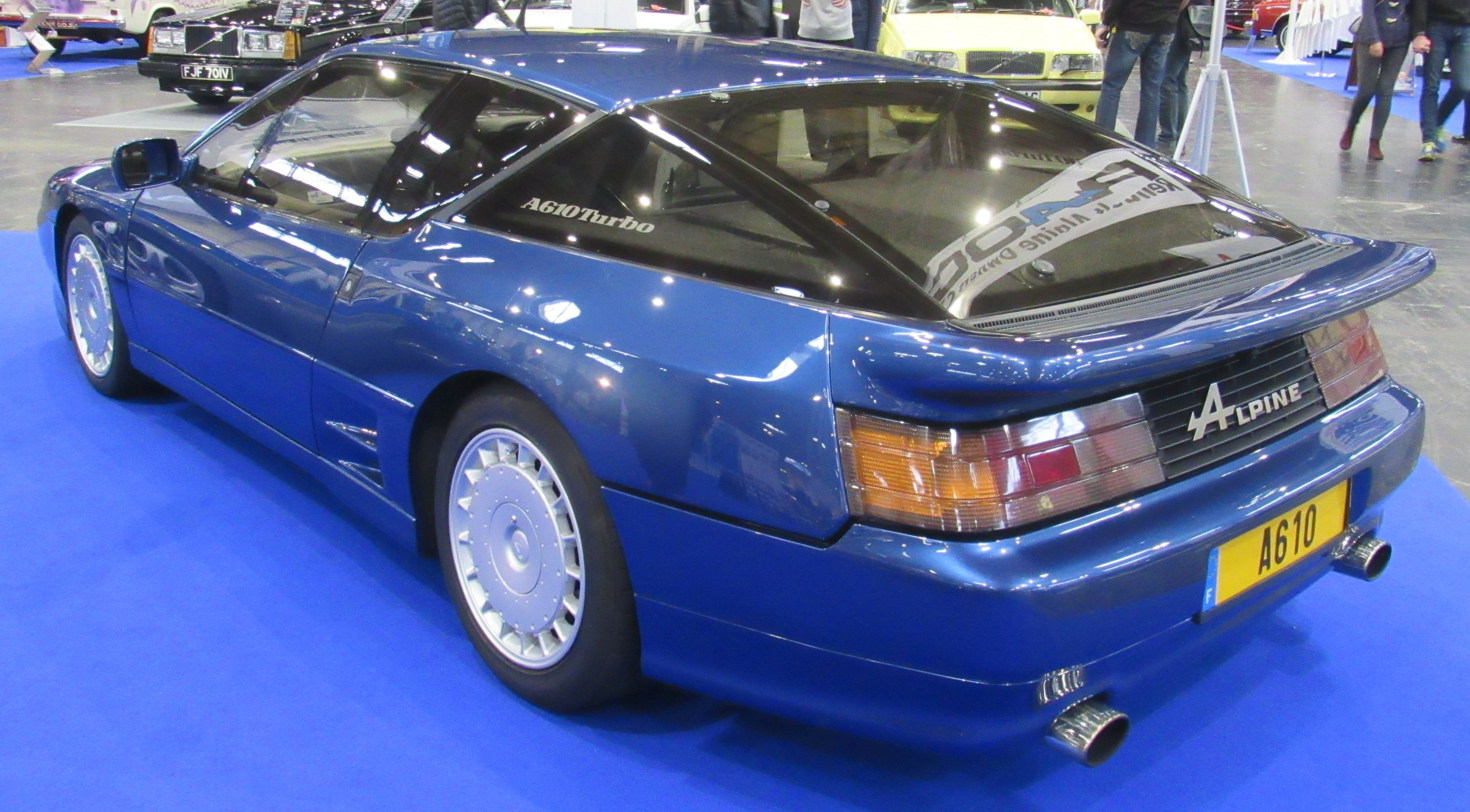
1992 Alpine A610 Turbo 3.0 rear view

The A610 Magny-Cours was created for the Williams-Renault Formula One victory in the French Grand Prix at Magny-Cours in July 1991. 31 cars were built, with specific color and interior. They carry a "Magny-Cours" legend on the doors and have body-colored rims.

The A610 did not result in an improvement in sales over the commercially disappointing GTA and the car was discontinued in 1995, despite acclaim from the motoring press, and approval from the British car show Top Gear. The A610 was to be the last car to carry the Alpine name until the 2017 release of the new Alpine A110. After production of the A610 ended, the Alpine factory in Dieppe produced the Renault Spider. 818 were built, 67 of which were right-hand-drive. Sales the first two years were acceptable, but from 1993 until production ended in 1995 a mere 80 cars were built. Total production numbers for the GTA and A610 amounted to roughly 7,300 units.

In Jeremy Clarkson's 2007 direct to DVD film Supercar Showdown, the production infamously destroyed a particularly rare right-hand-drive example of the A610, by driving it into a concrete K-rail.

=== Specifications ===
| Model | A610 - D 503 05 |
| Engine type | PRV 90º V6 Code: Z7X-744 |
| Position | Longitudinally-mounted, Rear-engine, rear-wheel-drive layout |
| Fuel feed | Renix Bendix-Siemens fuel injection |
| Valvetrain | SOHC 2 valves per cylinder |
| Bore X Stroke | 93 mm × 73 mm (3.66 in × 2.87 in); 72.7 mm (2.86 in) stroke from March 1993 |
| Displacement | 2975 cc 2963 cc from March 1993 |
| Compression ratio | 7.6:1 |
| Max. power | 184 kW (250 PS; 247 bhp) at 5,750 rpm |
| Max. torque | 350 N⋅m (258 lb⋅ft) at 2,900 rpm |
| Catalytic converter | 3-way Lambda-sensor |
| Fuel type | RON 95 or 98 unleaded petrol |
| Aspiration | Garrett AiResearch T3 Turbocharger 0.76 bar (11.0 psi) |
| Gearbox | 5 speed manual transmission |
| Kilometer start-stop | 25 to 26 s |
| 0 to 100 km/h (62 mph) | 5.9 s or 5.7 s |
| Max. speed | 265 km/h (165 mph) |
| Consumption 90 km/h (56 mph) 120 km/h (75 mph) Town | 7.3 L/100 km (39 mpg_{‑imp}; 32 mpg_{‑US}); 9.2 L/100 km (31 mpg_{‑imp}; 26 mpg_{‑US}); 14.7 L/100 km (19.2 mpg_{‑imp}; 16.0 mpg_{‑US}) |
| Fuel tank | 80 L (17.6 imp gal; 21.1 US gal) |
| Aerodynamic Drag coefficient | Cx : 0.30 - SCx : 0.54 |
