= PRV engine =

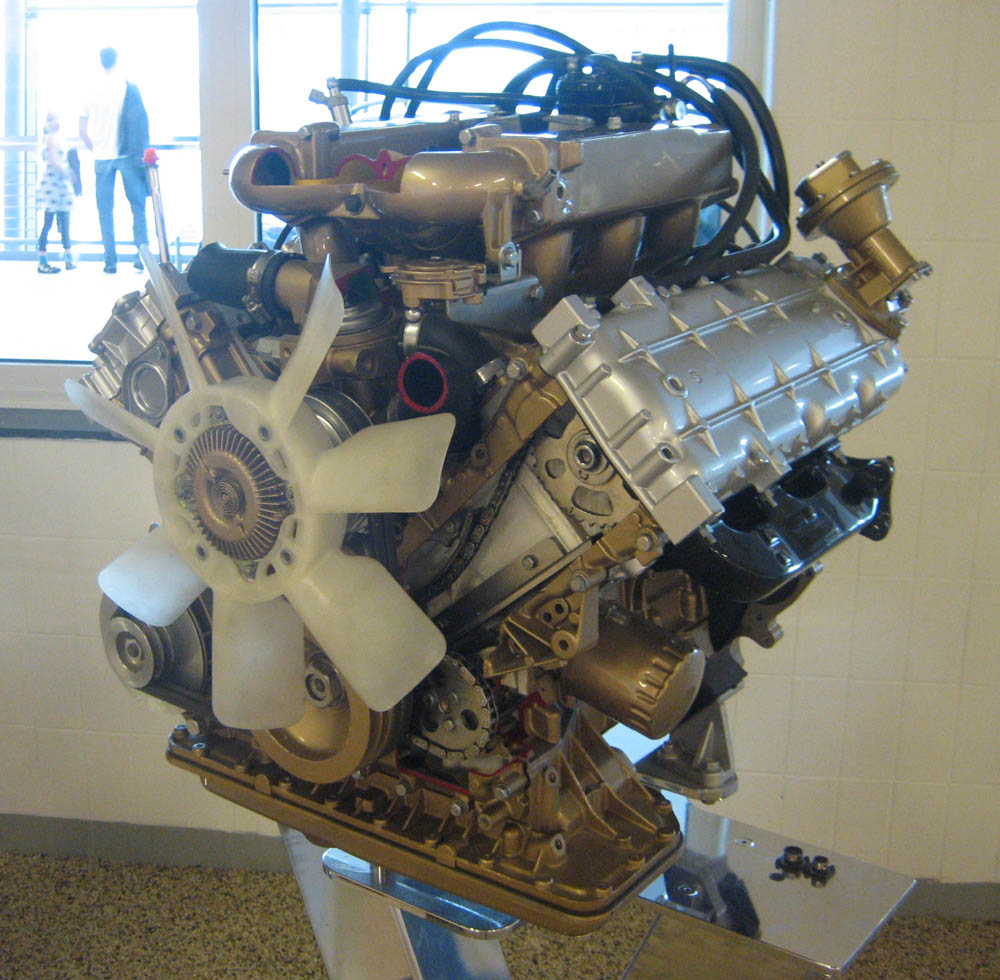

Overview
- Manufacturer: Française de Mécanique
- Production: 1974–1998

Layout
- Configuration: 90° V6
- Displacement: 2,458 cc (2.5 L; 150.0 cu in); 2,664 cc (2.7 L; 162.6 cu in); 2,849 cc (2.8 L; 173.9 cu in); 2,963 cc (3.0 L; 180.8 cu in); 2,975 cc (3.0 L; 181.5 cu in)
- Cylinder bore: 88 mm (3.46 in); 91 mm (3.58 in); 93 mm (3.66 in)
- Piston stroke: 63 mm (2.48 in); 72.7 mm (2.86 in); 73 mm (2.87 in)
- Cylinder block material: Aluminium
- Cylinder head material: Aluminium
- Valvetrain: SOHC 2 or 4 valves per cyl DOHC 4 valves per cyl (race engine)

Combustion
- Turbocharger: Various versions
- Fuel system: Carburetor; Fuel injection
- Fuel type: Gasoline
- Oil system: Wet sump
- Cooling system: Water-cooled

Output
- Power output: 97–300 kW (132–408 PS; 130–402 bhp)
- Torque output: 208–520 N⋅m (153–384 lbf⋅ft)

Chronology
- Successor: V6 ESL engine Volvo Modular engine

The PRV engine is an overhead cam V6 automobile engine designed and manufactured by the company "Française de Mécanique" for PRV, an alliance of Peugeot, Renault and Volvo Cars. Sold from 1974 to 1998, it was produced in four displacements between 2.5 L and 3.0, and in both SOHC and DOHC and 2-valve and 4-valve per cylinder configurations. Originally carbureted, it adopted fuel-injection for improved emissions compliance and improved performance. It was also offered in turbo and twin-turbo versions in a limited number of vehicles made by Renault, Chrysler Motors, and French sports car manufacturer Venturi.

It was gradually replaced after 1994 by another engine jointly developed by Peugeot-successor PSA and Renault, known as the ES engine at PSA and the L engine at Renault.

== Corporate history ==
In 1966, Peugeot and Renault entered a cooperative agreement to manufacture common components. The first joint subsidiary, La Française de Mécanique (also called Compagnie Française de Mécanique or simply FM) was launched in 1969. The FM factory was built in Douvrin near Lens in northern France. The PRV engines are sometimes referred to as "Douvrin" engines, though that name is more commonly applied to a family of straight-fours produced at the same time.

In 1971, Volvo joined Peugeot and Renault in the creation of PRV, an equally-held public limited company (plc). PRV originally planned to build V8 engines, although these were later scrapped in favor of a smaller and more fuel-efficient V6.

The PRV engine followed a standard V8 90-degree cylinder bank configuration rather than the customary 60, but had its crankpins 120 degrees apart. The Maserati V6 of the Citroën SM followed a remarkably similar pattern of development.

The 1973 energy crisis, and taxes levied against engine displacement greater than 2.8 litres made large V8 engines less attractive, and expanded the market for smaller displacement engines.

Additionally, Renault needed a V6 engine to fit in its new model, the Renault 30. Renault's internal designation for the PRV was Z-Type.

Machinery for assembling the engines arrived at Douvrin in early June 1973, and buildings for producing the engines were finished in January 1974. The first PRV engines were officially introduced on 3 October 1974 in the Volvo 264, designated the B27 by the automaker. Adoption was swift, and the PRV V6 had been sold in at least five different models by the end of 1975.

The B27 was used in the Volvo 264/265 until 1980. The B28 was also used in the Volvo 264/265 and in a rare version of the 240 GLT (244/245 GLT 6) between 1980 and 1983, and in the Volvo 760 between 1982 and 1986. The last version of the PRV engine in a Volvo was the B280, installed in the Volvo 760 from 1987 to 1990 and in the Volvo 780 (all model years). The Volvo 262 C was also fitted with the PRV, the first years with the B27 and the last years with the B28. The B280 was significantly changed; only the engine block remained the same as the B27/B28, the rest is different. The B280 was also installed in a small number of 960s in 1991.

In 1984, the first commercially available turbocharged PRV V6 was sold in the Renault 25 V6 Turbo. This was the first to be even-fire with split crankpins, and was the first of the second generation, and indeed EFI engine of any sort. Turbocharged versions went on to be used in the Renault Alpine GTA V6 Turbo (essentially the same engine as the 25 Turbo at 2.5 L (2,458 cc), Renault Alpine A610, and Renault Safrane Bi-turbo – both with 3.0 L (2,963 cc) low compression. Naturally aspirated 2963 cc and 2975 cc versions of both low- and high-compression 3-litre engines appeared in a number of Peugeot, Citroën and Renault cars until 1997.

While Renault were working forced induction into the PRV, Peugeot and Citroën developed their own 24-valve engines as an option in the 605 and XM respectively. The compression remained the same as the Renault 12v, but the pistons differed, as did some of the timing gear, and the heads were re-engineered to allow easier maintenance (the camshaft being fitted from the opposite end for example). This engine was however extremely expensive, and suffered cam wear problems. This was due to the exhaust valves sharing a single lobe, while each inlet valve had its own lobe. This was at least partially solved by the use of ceramic followers as one of a succession of recalls.

Meanwhile, French sports car manufacturer Venturi had been developing their own versions of the PRV. The most powerful versions they built were in the Atlantique 300 at 207 kilowatts (281 PS; 278 bhp) from a turbocharged, 12-valve 3.0 L iteration, and they successfully raced at the 24 Hours of Le Mans with the 600LM with a twin turbocharged, 24-valve 3.0-litre, pushing out over 450 kilowatts (610 hp) in race spec, and the road-going spin-off, the 400GT managed 300 kilowatts (408 PS; 402 bhp). This used the low compression bottom end common to the Renault turbo engines, coupled to 24-valve cylinder heads with bespoke rockers and tappets.

Peugeot too allowed a small group of engineers to create a team for endurance racing, and after a few years the team grew to be called WM Peugeot. The ultimate version of the car used a low compression 3.0-litre bottom end coupled to bespoke twin-cam heads. It is the only DOHC PRV. This car still holds the top speed record at 24 Hours of Le Mans set in 1988. By taping over the engine cooling intakes to improve aerodynamics, the team managed to push the car to 407 kilometres per hour (253 mph) on the 5 kilometres (3.1 mi) straight before the engine was destroyed.

Volvo began to withdraw from the PRV consortium in the late 1980s and the year model 1991 was the last year for the PRV in a Volvo, shifting its powerplant reliance onto in-house inline engines: the successor to its PRV-powered 760, the 960, debuted with a new inline six "white block" Modular engine. Peugeot, Renault and Citroën continued using the PRV until 1997.

After producing 970,315 units, production of the PRV V6 was stopped on 15 June 1998.

== Engineering ==
=== Uneven firing order ===
The original engineering work done on the V8 engine can still be seen in the resulting V6 engine: its cylinder banks are arranged at 90°, instead of the much more common 60°. V8 engines nearly universally feature 90° configurations, because this allows a natural firing order. V6 engines, on the other hand, produce even firing intervals between cylinders when their two banks of cylinders are arranged at 120°. 90-degree V6 engines, like the PRV, experience uneven firing, which can be addressed using split crankshaft journals. 90° V6 engines are shorter in height and wider than 60° engines, allowing lower engine bay hood/bonnet profiles.

First-generation PRV engines (1974–1985) featured uneven firing order. Second-generation PRV engines (introduced in 1984 in the Renault 25 Turbo) featured split crankshaft journals to create evenly spaced ignition events. Other similar design examples are the odd-fire and even-fire Buick V6 and the Maserati V6 seen in the Citroën SM.

=== PRV varieties ===
- Z6W-A 700: 2849 cc carbureted version used in Renault Alpine V6 GT
- Z7U-702: Used in the Renault 25 V6 Turbo
- Z7U-730: turbocharged version used in the Renault Alpine V6 Turbo
- Z7X-711: Used in the Eagle Premier/Dodge Monaco
- Z7X-715: Used in the Eagle Premier/Dodge Monaco
- Z7X-726: Renault Safrane Bi-turbo
- Z7X-744: Renault Alpine A610
- ZM112: Carbureted version used in the Peugeot 504
- ZMJ140: Fuel-injected version used in the Peugeot 504
- ZMJ-159: Fuel-injected version used in the DMC DeLorean
- ZN3J 154F: Fuel-injected (Bosch LH-Jetronic) version used in the Peugeot 505
- ZN3J 154X: Catalyzed fuel-injected (Bosch LH-Jetronic) version used in the Peugeot 505
- ZNJK: Fuel-injected version used in the Peugeot 604
- ZPJ S6A: Fuel-injected version used in the Peugeot 605 and the Citroën XM
- ZPJ4 SKZ: Fuel-injected multivalve version used in the Peugeot 605 and the Citroën XM
- B27A: Carbureted version used in the Volvo 260
- B27E: Fuel-injected version used in the Volvo 260
- B27F: Low compression fuel-injected version used in the Volvo 260
- B28A: Carbureted version used in the Volvo 260 and some rare early Volvo 760
- B28E: Fuel-injected version used in the Volvo 260 and the Volvo 760
- B28F: Low compression fuel-injected version used in the Volvo 260 and the Volvo 760
- B280E: Fuel-injected version used in the Volvo 760, Volvo 780 and the Volvo 960 for the 1st year in certain markets
- B280F: Low compression fuel-injected version used in the Volvo 760, Volvo 780 and the Volvo 960 for the first year in certain markets

=== Specifications ===
Displacement	2,458 cc (150.0 cu in)	2,664 cc (162.6 cu in)	2,849 cc (173.9 cu in)	2,963 cc (180.8 cu in)	2,975 cc (181.5 cu in)
Bore × stroke	91 mm × 63 mm	88 mm × 73 mm	91 mm × 73 mm	93 mm × 72.7 mm	93 mm × 73 mm
Number of valves	12			12 or 24	
Engine aspiration	Turbo	Naturally aspirated		Naturally aspirated or turbo	
Compression ratio	8.2–8.6:1	8.8–9.5:1	8.8–10.5:1	9.5:1; 7.6:1 (turbo)	9.5:1; 7.3–7.6:1 (turbo)
Power	134–136 kW (182–185 PS; 180–182 bhp) at 5500 rpm	92–110 kW (125–150 PS; 123–148 bhp) at 5500–6000 rpm	95–143 kW (129–194 PS; 127–192 bhp) at 5500–6000 rpm	123–147 kW (167–200 PS; 165–197 bhp) at 5500–6000 rpm 184 kW (250 PS; 247 bhp) at 5000–5750 rpm (turbo)	123–147 kW (167–200 PS; 165–197 bhp) at 5600–6000 rpm 184–300 kW (250–408 PS; 247–402 bhp) at 5750 rpm (turbo)
Torque	276–288 N⋅m (204–212 lbf⋅ft) at 2200–4000 rpm	207–218 N⋅m (153–161 lbf⋅ft) at 3000–3500 rpm	207–255 N⋅m (153–188 lbf⋅ft) at 2750–4000 rpm	235–260 N⋅m (173–192 lbf⋅ft) at 3600–4600 rpm 350 N⋅m (258 lbf⋅ft) at 2900 rpm (turbo)	235–260 N⋅m (173–192 lbf⋅ft) at 3600–4600 rpm 350–456 N⋅m (258–336 lbf⋅ft) at 2900 rpm (turbo)
Firing order	1-6-3-5-2-4				
Mass	–		156 kg (344 lb)	–	

== PRV powered automobiles ==
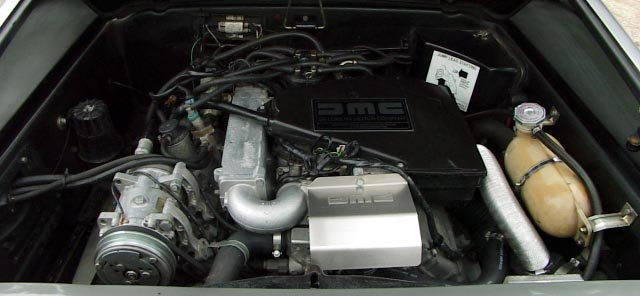
PRV engine in a DeLorean

The dates following each entry denote the introduction of a PRV V6-equipped models.

- 2458 cc:
  - Alpine GTA (September 1985–February 1991)
  - Renault 25 (1985–1995)
  - Venturi 180/200/210 (1987–1992)
- 2664 cc:
  - Alpine A310 (October 1976–1985)
  - Peugeot 504 coupé/cabriolet (1974–1983)
  - Peugeot 604 (March 1975–1984)
  - Renault 25 (1984–1988)
  - Renault 30 (March 1975–1984)
  - Talbot Tagora (1980–1983)
  - Volvo 260/264/265 (October 1974–1980)
  - Volvo 262C (1977–1980)
  - Volvo 363CS (1977, prototype)
- 2849 cc:
  - Alpine GTA (November 1984 – 1990)
  - DMC DeLorean (1981–1983)
  - Lancia Thema (1984–1992)
  - Panhard ERC
  - Panhard VCR
  - Peugeot 505 (July 1986–1992)
  - Peugeot 604 (1979–1985)
  - Peugeot P4
  - Peugeot Proxima (1986, prototype)
  - Peugeot Oxia (1988, prototype)
  - Renault 25 (1988–1992)
  - Renault Espace II (1991–1996)
  - UMM Alter II (90's)
  - Venturi 160 (1987–1992)
  - Venturi 260 (1989–1996)
  - Volvo 260/264/265 (1980–1982)
  - Volvo 262C (1980–1981)
  - Volvo 760/780 (February 1982–1991)
  - Volvo 960 (rare 1991 models)
- 2963 cc:
  - Alpine A610 (1993–1995)
  - Citroën XM (1993–1997)
  - Peugeot 605 (1990–1995)
  - Renault Espace III (1996–1998)
  - Renault Laguna I (1994–1997)
  - Renault Safrane (1992–1997)
- 2975 cc:
  - Alpine A610 (1991–1993)
  - Citroën XM (1989–1993)
  - Dodge Monaco (1990–1992)
  - Eagle Premier (1988–1992)
  - Peugeot 605 (1990–1995)
  - RJ Racing Helem V6 (1995, modified Renault Sport Spider)
  - UMM Alter II (90's)
  - Venturi 300 (1996–1998)
  - Venturi 400 (1994–1997)

== PRV engines in racing ==
- ALD C289 (1992 24 Hours of Le Mans endurance prototype)
- Alpine A310 Group 4 & B/12
- Alpine A610 GT2
- Chevron B36 (1987 24 Hours of Le Mans endurance prototype)
- Fouquet buggies
- Peugeot 504 V6 Coupé Rallye Group 4
- Peugeot P4 V6 Paris Dakar
- RJ Racing Helem V6
- Schlesser Original
- UMM Alter II
- Venturi 260LM, 400GTR, 500LM and 600LM
- WM P series (1976–1989 24 Hours of Le Mans endurance prototypes, including P80 that finished at 4th place at 1980 24 Hours of Le Mans and the famous P88 (Note: WM 1988 entry was built for speed, not meant to endure 24 hours; it failed after just 59 laps) that was known for setting the all-time Mulsanne Straight speed trap record of 407 km/h (253 mph) at 1988 24 Hours of Le Mans)
- Ultima Mk1/2/3

The PRV was also the basis for the 90° V6 engine used by Alfa Romeo in the 155 V6 Ti in the 1996 DTM/ITC season from Silverstone onwards. The engines in that series required the use of bank separation angle and cylinder bore spacing from a production based engine, and as a 90° V6 has greater room between banks than a 60° V6 for a more optimal induction system, Alfa Romeo used the PRV as a basis as it had been used in the Lancia Thema, a car which shared its platform with the Alfa Romeo 164, as well as the Fiat Croma and Saab 9000.

Other sources declare that the 90° V6 engine in 1996 Alfa Romeo 155 V6 Ti is based on a 2.6 L V8 from 1970 Alfa Romeo Montreal with two cylinders removed, as allowed by the rules, however the FIA homologation documentation shows the homologated production engine was a "2850cm³" capacity "V6" engine. The bore spacing of the Montreal engine was too close to be suitable for the 155 V6 Ti in any case. Limone invented the "Montreal V8" story to throw the press off the scent and to satisfy FIAT management who were unhappy that a non-FIAT group developed engine was being used.

== See also ==
- List of engines used in Chrysler products
