= Renault 20/30 =

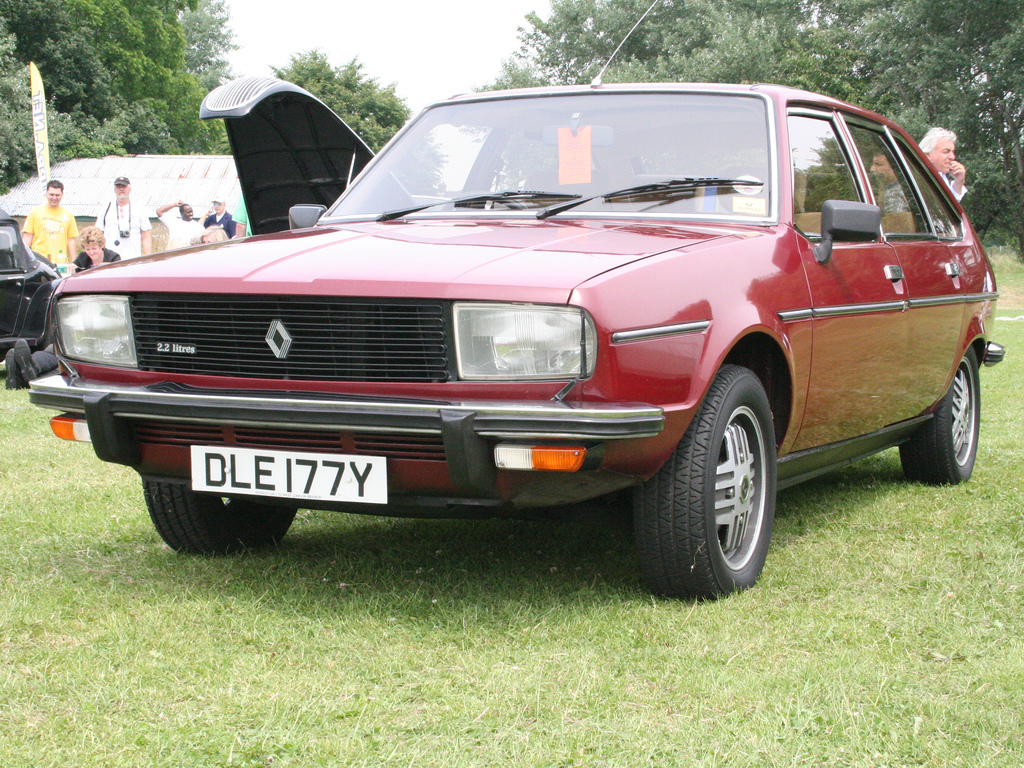
- 1983 Renault 20 TX

Overview
- Manufacturer: Renault
- Also called: Dacia 2000
- Production: 1975–1983 (Renault 30); 1976–1983 (Renault 20); 1979–1989 (Dacia 2000)
- Assembly: France: Sandouville (Sandouville Renault Factory); Australia: Heidelberg (Renault Australia); Romania: Ștefănești, Argeș (Dacia); Thailand; Venezuela: Valencia
- Designer: Gaston Juchet

Body and chassis
- Class: Executive car (E)
- Body style: 5-door hatchback
- Layout: Front-engine, front-wheel-drive

Powertrain
- Engine: Petrol: 1.6 L A2M/A6M I4; 2.0 L J6R I4; 2.2 L J7T I4; 2.7 L PRV V6; Diesel: 2.1 L J8S I4; 2.1 L J8S turbo I4
- Transmission: 4 / 5-speed manual; 3-speed automatic

Dimensions
- Wheelbase: 266 cm (104.7 in) (R20 1.6); 266.5 cm (104.9 in) (most); 267 cm (105.1 in) (1977–1980 R20 TS, R20 TX, R30 V6)
- Length: 452 cm (178.0 in); 450 cm (177.2 in) (R30, R20 post 1981)
- Width: 172.5 cm (67.9 in) (R20 1.6); 173 cm (68.1 in)
- Height: 143 cm (56.3 in); 143.5 cm (56.5 in) (R20 1.6, diesel)
- Curb weight: 1,175–1,320 kg (2,590–2,910 lb)

Chronology
- Predecessor: Renault 16
- Successor: Renault 25

The Renault 20 (R20) and Renault 30 (R30) are two executive cars produced by the French automaker Renault between 1975 and 1983. The most upmarket and expensive Renaults of their time, the two cars were almost identical with regard to sheet metal and mechanicals; the R30 was the larger-engined and more expensive of the two. The two cars were easily distinguished between each other from their differing headlight configuration – the Renault 20 had two single rectangular headlights, whereas the Renault 30 had quadruple round headlights. The interior specifications differed substantially, however, with the Renault 30 having a higher specification in all models. Over 622,000 R20s and 145,000 R30s were produced in Sandouville near Le Havre, France.

The 20 variant won 1978 What Car? "Car of the Year".

The Renault 30 variant had a reputation for heavy depreciation. Motorists Guide reported the cost of a brand new 30 TX Automatic as £11,950 in May 1984; by June 1986 a good example was worth about £3,450 within the motoring trade.

== Introduction ==
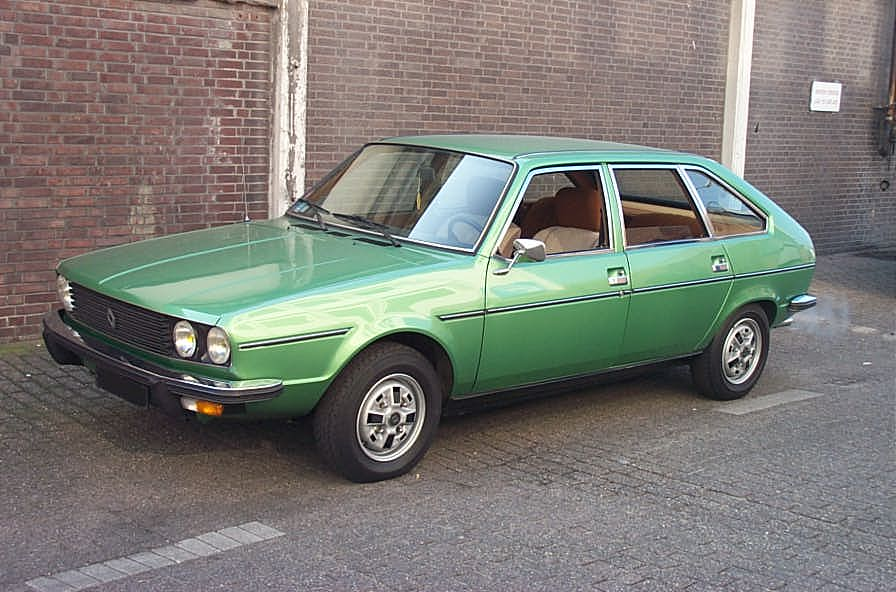
Renault 30

Launched in March 1975 at the Geneva Motor Show, the Renault 30 TS was marketed as Renault's flagship model and it was the first Renault with an engine having more than four cylinders since the pre-war Renault Vivastella. It was one of the first cars (the other two being the Peugeot 604 and Volvo 264) to use the then newly introduced 2664 cc PRV V6 engine, which was developed jointly between Peugeot, Renault and Volvo; the PRV produced 130 PS (96 kW) and could power the R30 to a top speed of 185 km/h (115 mph). The vehicle's hatchback styling was derivative of the extremely successful Renault 16.

The more affordable Renault 20 was presented at the Paris Salon in November 1975 (exactly eight months after the Renault 30 TS) and used the same hatchback body styling as the R30 but with two rectangular headlights instead of the R30's quadruple round lights. The Renault 20 was essentially a successor to the Renault 16, albeit in a rather larger body shell. Under the bonnet, the R20 had the smaller four-cylinder 1647 cc engine (from the Renault 16 TX) rated at 90 PS (66 kW). Other technical differences between the 20 and 30 were that 20 used drum brakes at the rear wheels, 13 inch wheel rims, and a smaller 60-litre fuel tank. The 20 came in three different trim variations: L, TL and GTL. The two cars were effectively two 'badge engineered' versions of the same car with separate numeric classification. The R20 received an all-new 2068 cc diesel engine in November 1979, Renault's first diesel automobile.

Both the 20 and 30 were advanced in terms of safety, featuring front and rear crumple zones as well as side impact protection. Aside from the unusual proportions, the 20/30 also received unique, downwards-folding door handles on the first two model years. These were changed to regular units in August 1976, for the 1977 model year.

=== In the market ===
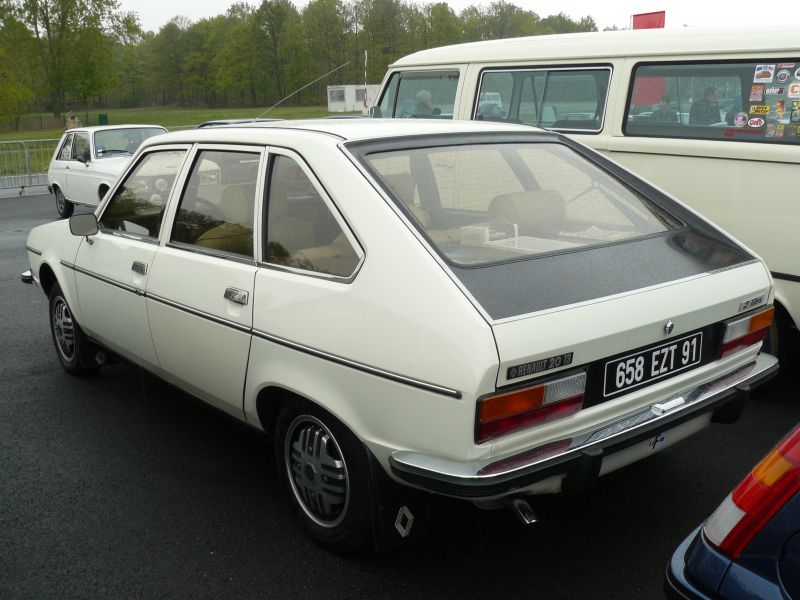
Rear view of a Renault 20 TS

Reliability issues, such as niggling mechanical faults (which sometimes proved expensive to fix) plagued both cars throughout their lifetimes. This was a factor in the cars' heavy depreciation on the used car market in the UK. Other large cars with steep depreciation included the Peugeot 604 and Rover SD1. Rust was another major concern (in a Belgian owner referendum 70% of owners named it as the car's biggest problem); as a response Renault improved rust protection and began offering a five-year warranty against rust on 1 January 1982.

The Renault brand was never strong in the upper segments of the market, particularly outside of France. Coupled with the hatchback bodywork, anaemic engines (to suit the French tax structure), and quality concerns, export sales were always low. In the end, over 63 percent of the total 20/30 production was sold in the French home market. However, the Renault 20 and 30 was assembled from complete knock-down kit in certain countries. In Venezuela, the R30 TS was assembled between 1979 and 1984, while the R20 TS was assembled in Australia from 1979 to 1981 and in Thailand in 1979 and 1980. While never sold in the United States, the R30 was brought to Canada in small numbers (426 cars according to a Renault Canada employee).

The Renault 30 was also officially imported for into Renault Argentina as a luxury car to compete with other imports in 1979 and 1982, mostly in TS V6 and TX versions.

A Renault 30 was used as an official state car for President François Mitterrand during his election campaigns from 1979 onwards, and then during first years in office, including when he won the election in 1981. In 1984, he switched to its successor, Renault 25.

=== Changes ===
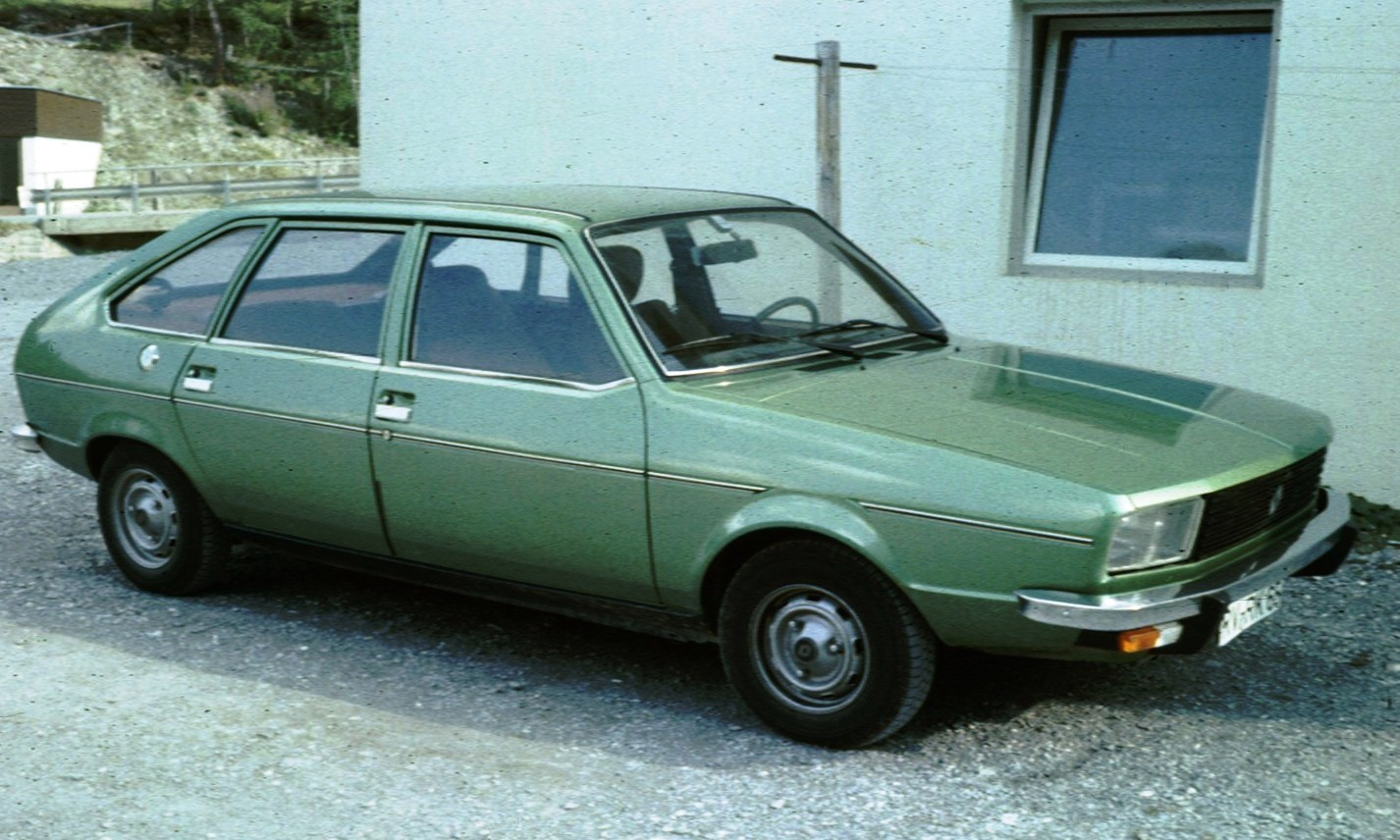
A very early Renault 20, still with the upside-down door handles

Shortly after their introduction, it soon became quite clear that the Renault 20 was too underpowered to cope with the overall size and weight of the car and that the Renault 30 was seen as too expensive for what was effectively the same car. In response to this, the R20TS was introduced, and used a new four-cylinder 1995 cc overhead camshaft engine rated at 109 PS (80 kW) (which was shared with the Citroën CX and later the Peugeot 505). The new 2.0-litre engine was universally regarded as a big improvement. The following year (October 1978) saw the introduction of the R30 TX, a more luxurious fuel-injected version of the R30 TS, then the R20 Diesel in late 1979. By late 1981, all 1.6-litre R20s were discontinued, leaving the LS 2.0 as the smallest model in the range.

In 1980 the NG1 five-speed transmission was switched for the longer-geared and smoother shifting 395 unit. In July 1980, the 2.2-litre fuel-injected R20 TX was added to the range, followed by the R30 Turbo Diesel one year later. The R30 Diesel Turbo has the trim of the R30 TX, albeit with unique alloys, with an engine delivering 85 PS (63 kW) derived from the naturally aspirated diesel engine. In France this engine was also available as an R20, beginning in early 1982. The range was facelifted for the 1981 model year. Production of the 20 and 30 ceased on 16 October 1983 to make way for the Renault 25.

=== Timeline ===
- March 1975 – Introduction of the Renault 30 TS, a large 5-door hatchback available in only one specification, the TS with the 2664 cc V6 PRV engine (developed jointly between Peugeot, Renault and Volvo), with a choice between a 4-speed manual or 3-speed automatic gearbox. The R30 TS had power-assisted steering, four round Quartz-Iodide headlights, electric front windows and central locking.
- October 1975 – Introduction of the Renault 20, in L, TL and GTL specifications, with the smaller four-cylinder 1647 cc (90 PS (66 kW)) engine and 4-speed gearbox. All three variations of the R20 had two rectangular headlights instead of the four round ones like on the R30 TS. The L had very basic trim and no hubcaps. The TL had a better equipment level, while the GTL had much the same equipment level as the TS. Automatic transmission was optional on the R20 TL and R20 GTL. Quartz Iodide Headlights optional on all R20 models.
- 1976 – The 1647 cc engine from the R20 had the power rating increased to 96 PS (71 kW).
- August 1976 – The updated R1275 version replaced the original R30 TS (R1273), with some minor engine modifications and now with grey headlight surrounds, a new fuel lid and with regular doorhandles replacing the upside-down ones originally used. The power of the V6 dropped from 131 to 125 PS (96 to 92 kW).
- July 1977 – Introduction of the R20 TS. It had a new 1995 cc engine rated at 109 PS (80 kW), with the choice of a 4-speed manual or 3-speed automatic gearbox. The equipment level remained largely the same as the R20 GTL.
- Late 1977/Early 1978 – The R20 L was dropped from the range because of slow sales, not helped by its low price. All models got a restyled instrument panel visor. Optional steel wheels with Michelin TRX tyres.
- October 1978 – Introduction of the R30 TX. It had a more powerful Bosch K-Jetronic fuel-injected 144 PS (106 kW) version of the 2664 cc V6 engine, 5-speed manual or 3-speed automatic gearbox. It also had alloy wheels, electric windows all-round, electric sunroof, velour upholstery, and front and rear head restraints.
- 1979 – Revisions to all models: driver's side rear fog light and rear seat belts. The R20 TS got a new cooling fan, inertia reel rear seat belts, a new windscreen wiper switch and the choice of a 5-speed gearbox. The R30 TS got a more powerful 130 PS (96 kW) engine and a small pocket in the drivers sun visor. Also in that year, the introduction of the R20 LS. It had the same mechanical specification as the R20 TS but the equipment specification of the R20 TL.
- November 1979 – Introduction of the R20 Diesel (in TD and GTD forms) with a new 2,068 cc 63.5 PS (47 kW) diesel engine, 5-speed gearbox, negative offset front suspension and larger four-stud wheel rims. The R20 TD was the equivalent to the R20 TL/LS, while the R20 GTD was the equivalent to the R20 TS, only it added power-steering.
- 1980 - All models got a pantograph driver's side wiper and a completely restyled interior with new dashboard and instrument panel from the Renault Fuego. All petrol models got a new type of automatic transmission option. R20 TL/GTL got a new alternator with built-in electronic regulator and new, 3-spoke wheel rims. The R20 TS now had the wheel rims from the R30 TS. The R30 TS/TX got a chrome grille surround.
- July 1980 – The R20 LS is introduced. along with the R20 TX, with a new 2165 cc engine rated at 115 PS (85 kW).
- 1981 – All R20 models got a new dual-circuit braking system and negative offset front suspension. The R20 GTL was discontinued, briefly leaving the R20 TL the only model to have the 1.65-litre engine. The R30 TX got new bumpers and computer-controlled cruise control.
- July 1981 – A new turbodiesel is introduced with the R30 Turbo D.
- September 1981 – R20 TL is discontinued.
- Late 1981 – R30TS is discontinued
- 16 October 1983 — The R20 and R30 cease production, to be replaced by the Renault 25.

== Production figures ==
- R1270: 20/30 Turbo-D 8,706/18,895
- R1271: 20 L/TL/GTL 187,001
- R1272: 20 TS 201,401
- R1273: early 30 TS 32,497
- R1275: 30 TS 68,401
- R1276: 20 TD/GTD 84,801
- R1277: 20 LS/TS 100,401
- R1278: 30 TX 40,401
- R1279: 20 TX 33,801

== Foreign assembly ==
The Renault 30 TS was assembled in Venezuela as well, with the carburetted PRV V6 engine in combination with either the four-speed manual or the automatic transmission. 748 examples were built, beginning in 1979.

=== Dacia (Romania) ===
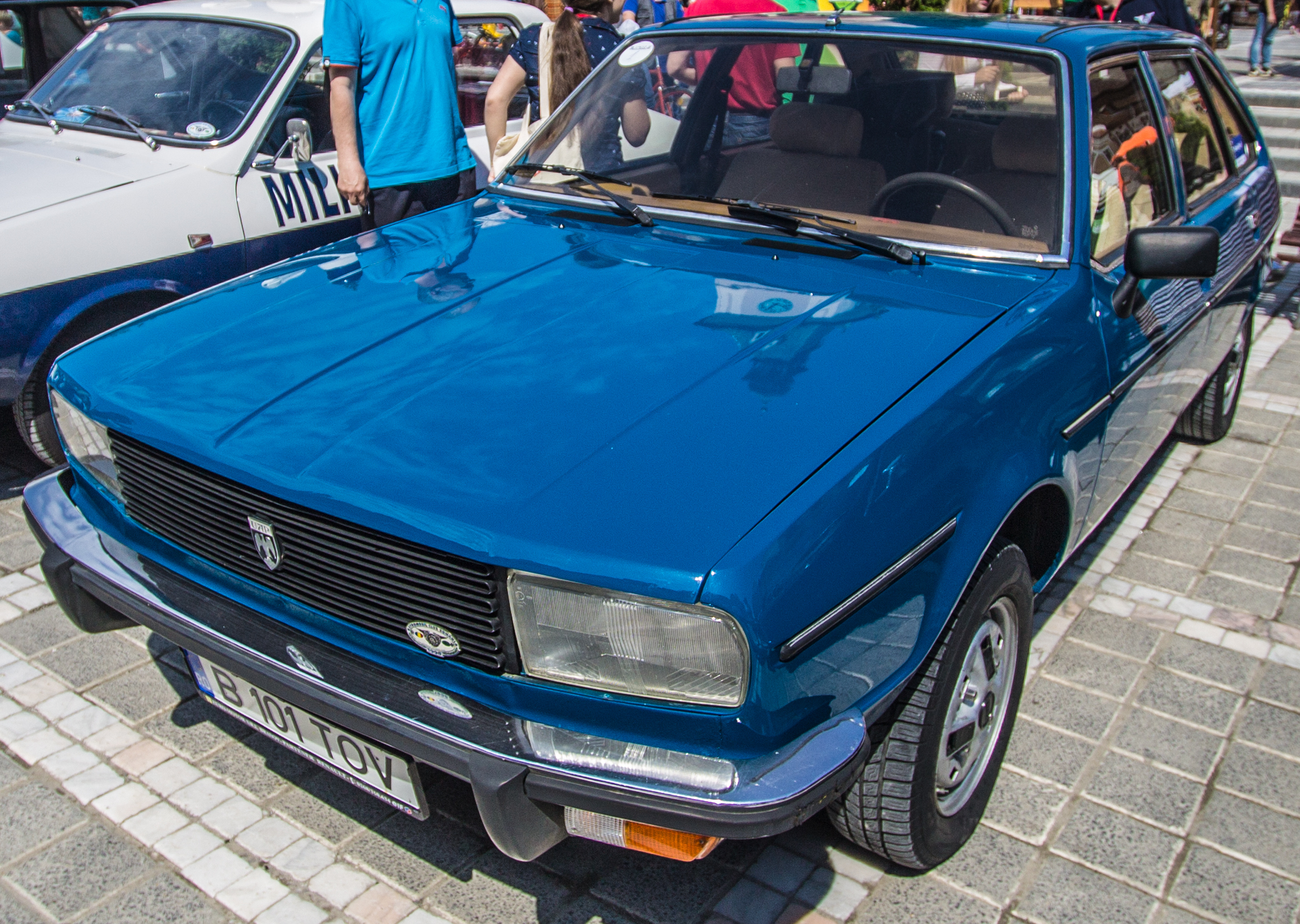
Dacia 2000 (Romania)

Between 1979 and 1985, the then state-owned Romanian manufacturer Dacia produced a small number of Renault 20s under the name Dacia 2000, reserved entirely for the dignitaries and secret police of the Communist government led by Nicolae Ceauşescu. It used the 109 PS (80 kW) 2-liter engine of the R20 TS.

== Motorsport ==
A specially prepared Renault 20 Turbo 4x4 driven by Bernard Marreau won the Paris-Alger-Dakar Rally in 1982. It had a turbocharged 1.6 litre engine as used in the Renault 18 Turbo and also had four-wheel drive.
