= Renault 25 =

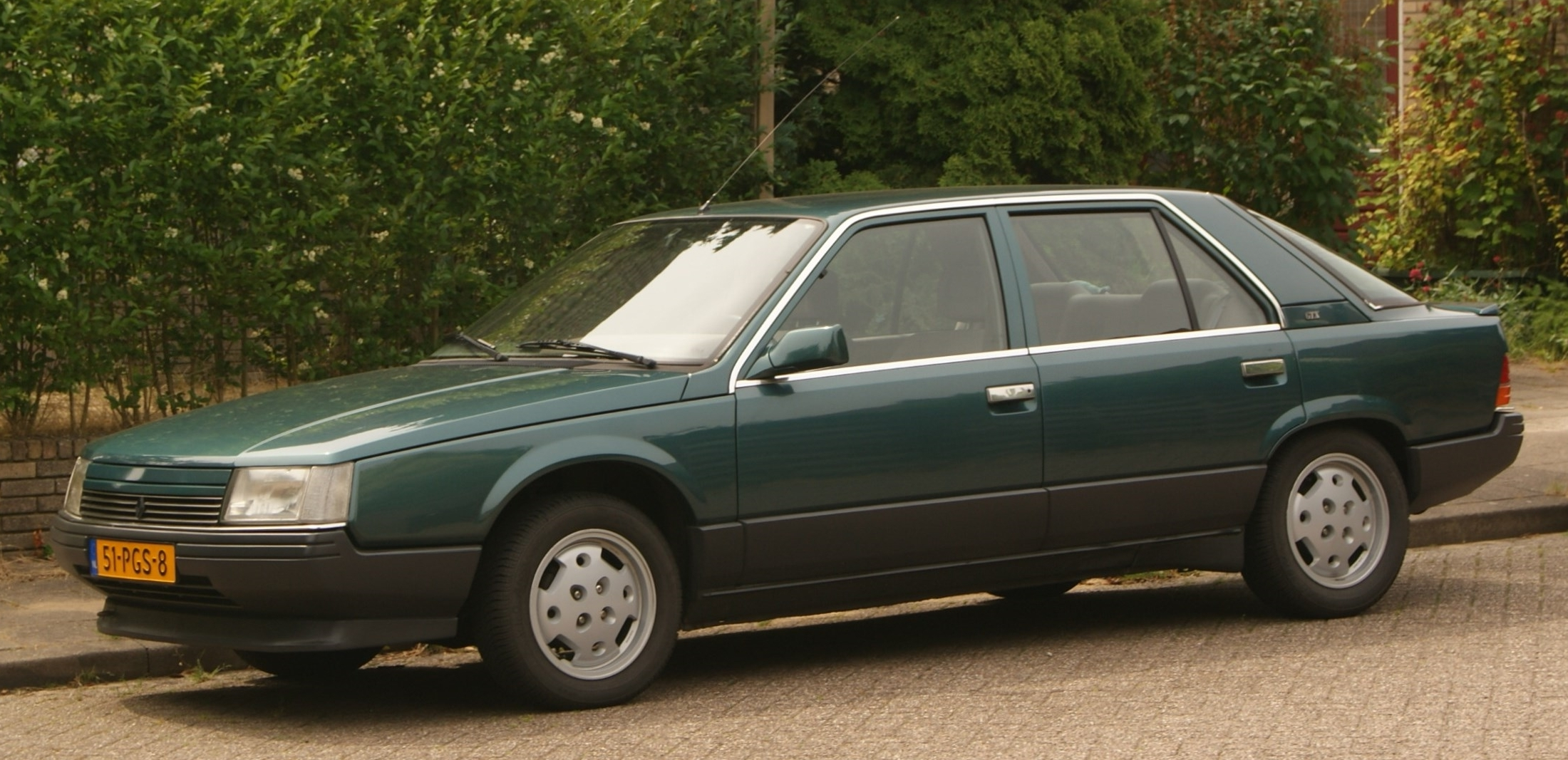
- 1985 Renault 25 GTX

Overview
- Manufacturer: Renault
- Production: 1983–1992
- Assembly: France: Sandouville (Sandouville Renault Factory)
- Designer: Robert Opron

Body and chassis
- Class: Executive car (E)
- Body style: 5-door liftback
- Layout: FF layout
- Related: Eagle Premier; Dodge Monaco

Powertrain
- Engine: Petrol and diesel from 2.0 to 2.8 L

Dimensions
- Wheelbase: 2,718 mm (107.01 in)
- Length: 4,713 mm (185.55 in)
- Width: 1,806 mm (71.10 in)
- Height: 1,410 mm (55.51 in)
- Curb weight: 1,180–1,410 kg (2,601–3,109 lb)

Chronology
- Predecessor: Renault 20/30
- Successor: Renault Safrane

The Renault 25 is an executive car produced by the French automaker Renault from 1983 to 1992.

The 25 was Renault's flagship, the most expensive, prestigious, and largest vehicle in the company's line up. It placed second in the 1985 European Car of the Year rankings. In total, 780,976 were built from 1983 until 1992.

All 25s were built in Sandouville, near Le Havre, France.

== Introduction ==
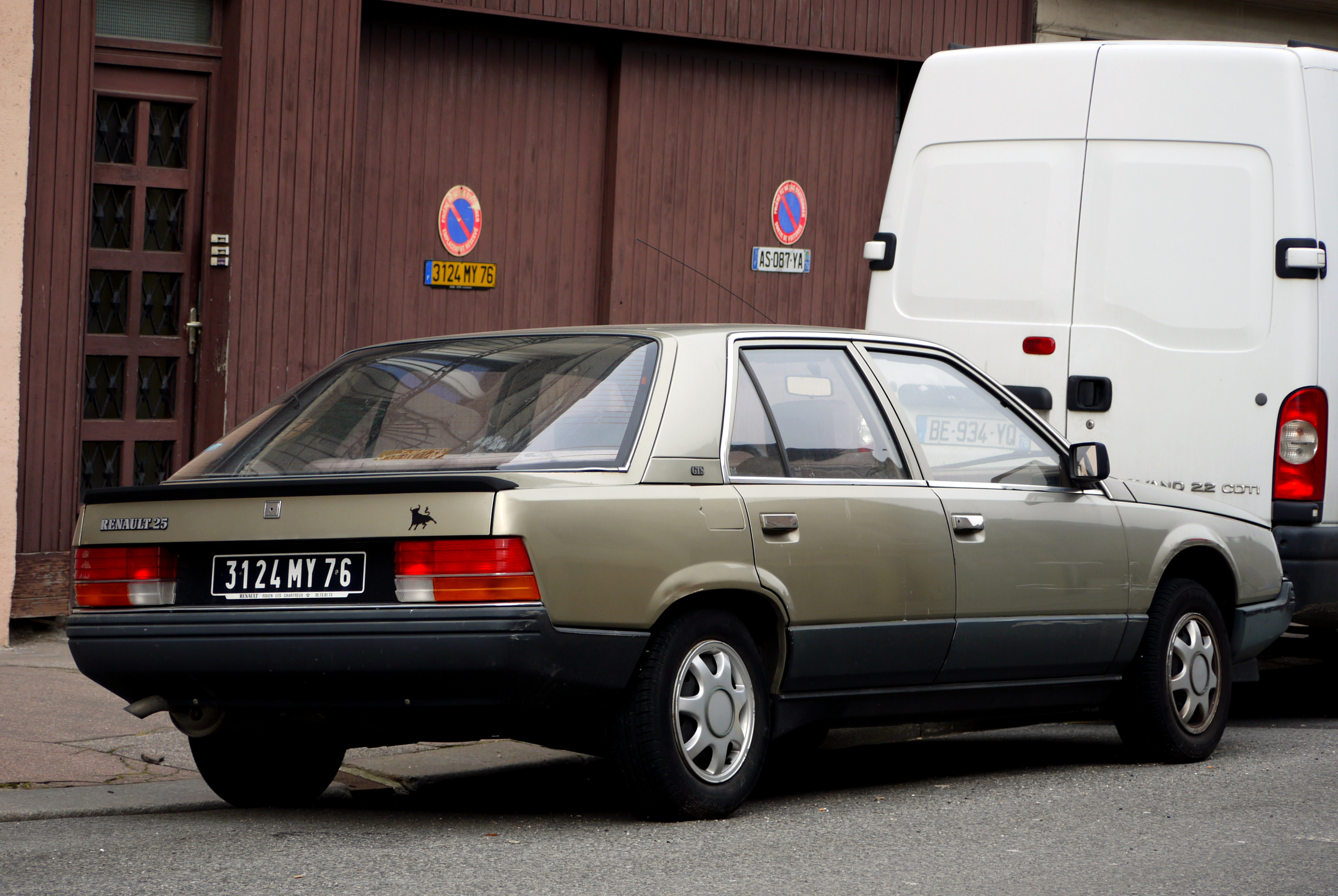
Pre facelift Renault 25

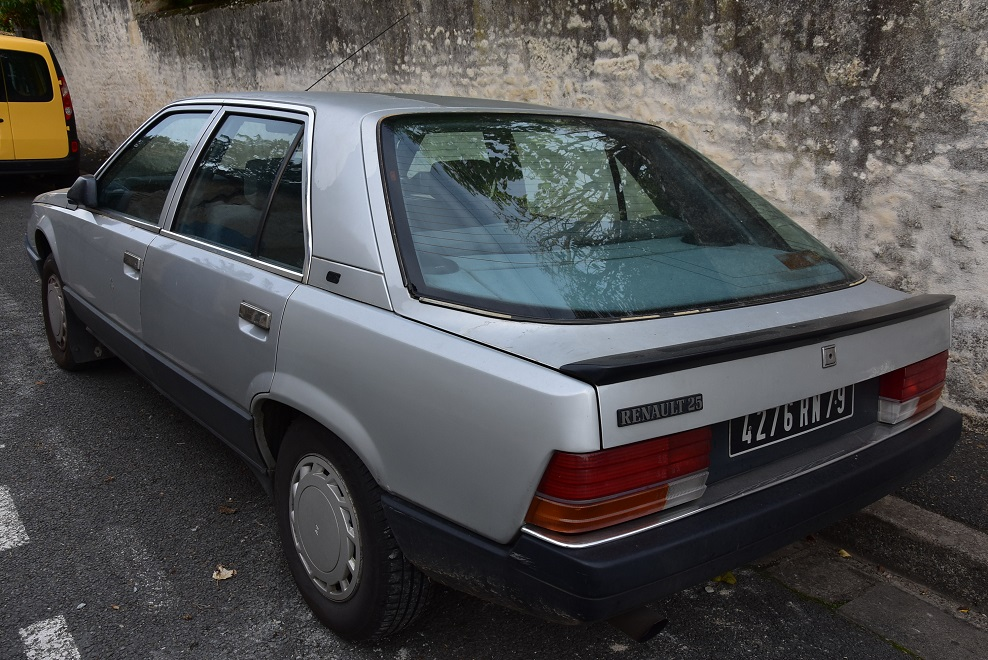
Renault 25 GTS '88, last model year before facelift

Introduced at the end of 1983 for a March 1984 start of sales, the Renault 25 was a large step forward in nearly every aspect from the Renault 20 / Renault 30 range it was replacing. Its five-door liftback body was penned by designers Gaston Juchet and Robert Opron of Citroën SM fame, and the unconventional style was aimed at giving the car a notchback look in order to overcome customer preference for formal saloons in the segment outside of France. The wraparound rear window was one of Opron's signature design features, used on many of his earlier designs such as the SM, the Renault Fuego, and the Renault 11.

The 25 was designed from the start for aerodynamic efficiency, giving a drag coefficient (C_{d}) as low as 0.28 on 2 litre models, rising up to 0.33 for diesel and V6 models, a key factor in improving fuel economy. The TS model briefly held the unofficial title of "world's most aerodynamic mass production car" with a C_{d} of 0.28.

All Renault 25 models were front-wheel drive, with four-cylinder (2 and 2.2 L petrol injection or 2.1 L diesel) and six-cylinder (2849 cc and 2458 cc turbo injection) engines mounted longitudinally forward of the front axle. The 25's performance was above average for its class, at least in the V6 Turbo specification. A turbodiesel version of the J8S engine was also available.

The 25 was praised for its ride comfort and spirited handling (despite slight understeer, and torque steer on V6 Turbo models). A newly designed manual transmission drew unanimous praise for its precision and smoothness (although the detent spring on fifth gear could cause misselection of third gear). The futuristic interior was designed by Italian designer Marcello Gandini (of Lamborghini fame) and was somewhat controversial, but the 25's passenger compartment was considered quiet, spacious, and well lit.

The 25 included, among other features, an express up and down feature on the driver's power window, voice alerts (covering items such as improperly shut doors/bonnet/boot – oil pressure, engine temperature/charging circuit and blown bulbs), and one of the world's first remote stereo controls, mounted to the right of the steering column (controlling volume +/–, station search, station select (jog wheel) in radio mode with volume +/–, mute and track advance (if supported)). For the first time since World War II, Renault had an entry in the full-size market segment outside France.

== Automatic transmission ==
The Renault 25's least durable part was the automatic transmission. As a result, most 25s remaining are the five-speed manual and few automatics have survived. Three automatic transmissions were used on R25: MJ3, 4141, both three-speed, and a new four-speed AR4, later used on the Renault Safrane as AD4/AD8. Due to the poor quality and design of the ATF cooler, especially on the later AR4, these versions have gained a poor reputation for reliability. A leaking ATF cooler could lead to gearbox failure with little or no physical warning, except for ATF stains beneath the vehicle to which not all drivers paid attention or not quickly enough.

The first transmissions started failing within a few years, while the model was still in production. Renault then prepared a package that was to replace the original poor-quality cooler regardless of vehicle age and mileage. However, the cooler location in front of the right wheel could not be changed. As a result, Renault 25 Automatics with the AR4 transmission are rare today.

== Facelift ==
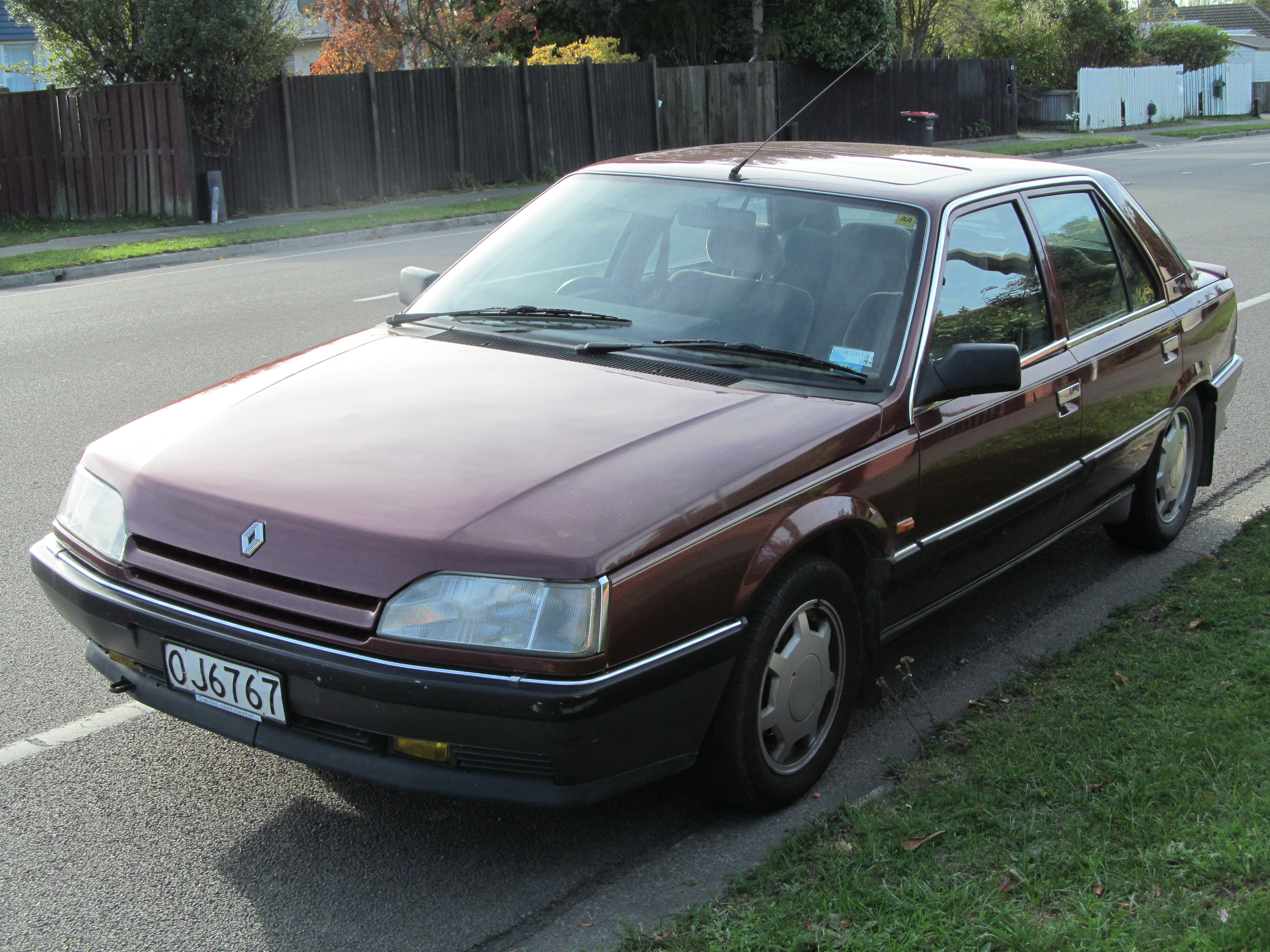
1989 Renault 25 Versailles (post facelift)

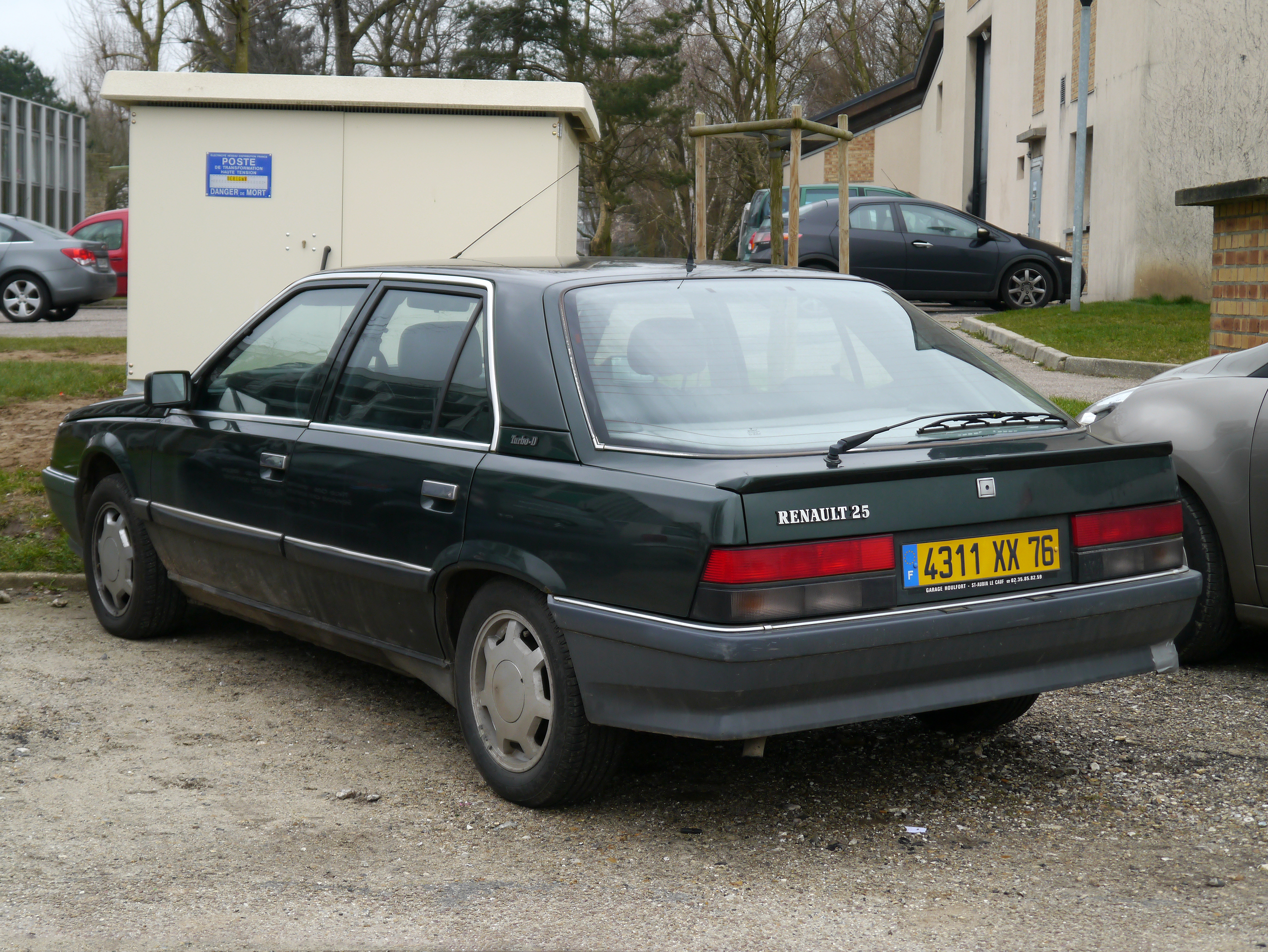
Post facelift Renault 25

The car underwent a facelift in June 1988, with a new front end, taillights, interior materials, and front suspension. Essentially, every panel was changed on the facelifted car, with the intent to smooth the styling. The new version also featured more powerful engines, the 2.2i engine being dropped and replaced by a 12v version of the 2.0i engine which produced 140 PS (103 kW).

There were a small number of run-out post-facelift cars fitted with the 2.2i engine, mainly to use up stocks. Power increased marginally and these were rated at 126 PS (93 kW). The 2.2 engine was removed from French listings in 1990 but production continued for certain export markets until production of the 25 ended in February 1992, to make way for the Renault Safrane.

== Trim levels ==
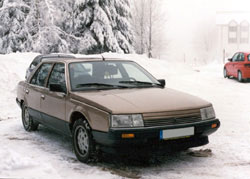
Dual-beam headlights in a pre-facelift Renault 25 V6

French market specifications:

- Level 1: Power steering, front power windows, and sound system optional. No side body cladding or rear window wiper. Single beam headlights.
- Level 2: Power steering, front power windows, two-speaker stereo, side body cladding, and rear window wiper standard. 2 x 6 W sound system with steering wheel-mounted controls (specially designed by Philips for this model) optional.
- Level 3: Front and rear power windows, power mirrors, and 2 x 6 W Philips sound system standard. Trip computer and digital fuel gauge on gasoline versions. Anti-lock brakes, air conditioning, and 4 x 20 W Philips sound system with steering wheel-mounted controls optional.
- Level 4: 4 x 20 W Philips sound system and express up/down driver's power window standard. dual-beam headlights.
- Level 5: Air conditioning, leather interior, anti-lock brakes, seven-way power front seats, adjustable rear headrests, and elmwood inserts (door panels, gear shift knob) standard.
- Level 6: Automatic climate control, cruise control, voice synthesizer, inflatable cushions, memory seat, memory mirrors, power door locks, power trunk release, power trunk close, variable assistance (speed-sensitive) power steering, alarm.
- Level 7: Electronically controlled hydraulic system for Baccara models (Variable rate shock absorption suspension. This system can be used in one of two ways: sport or automatic. In automatic mode, the electronic module will control three shock absorption levels known as "comfort", "medium" and "sport" mode, which will be selected automatically in accordance with a strategy taking into account the parameters of vehicle speed, longitudinal acceleration, transverse acceleration, vertical acceleration and "stop" lights switch).

=== Renault 25 Baccara ===
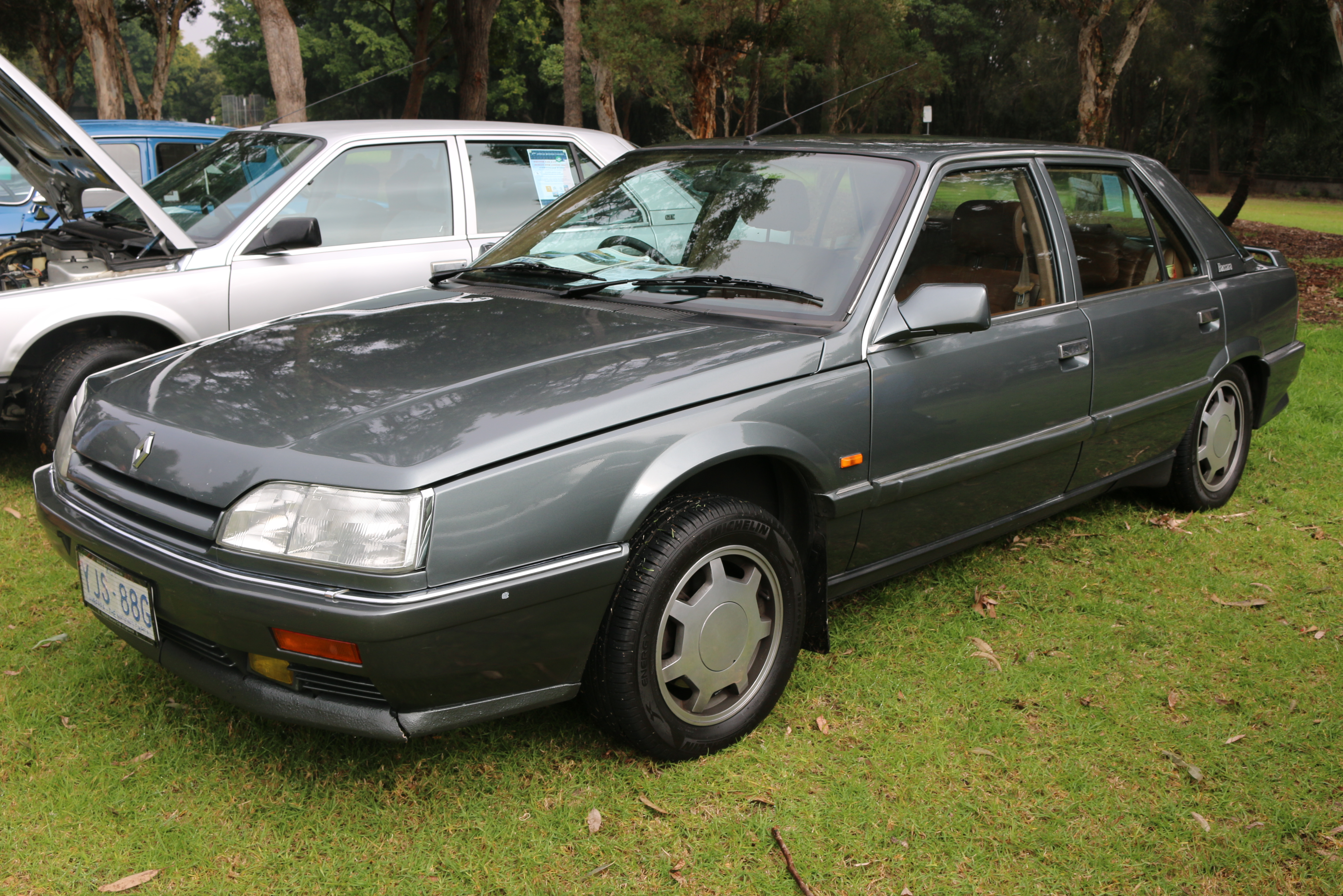
1990 Renault 25 Baccara

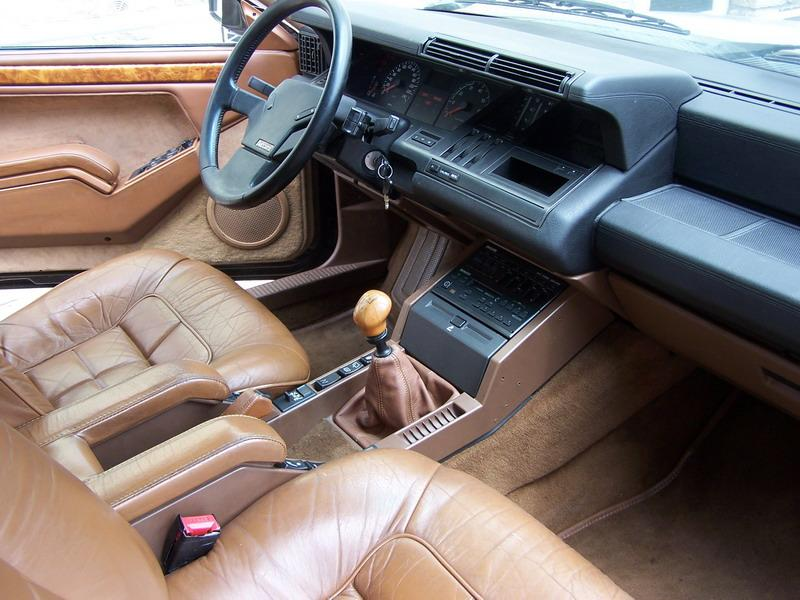
The interior of the Baccara was only available in Ambre or Cendre

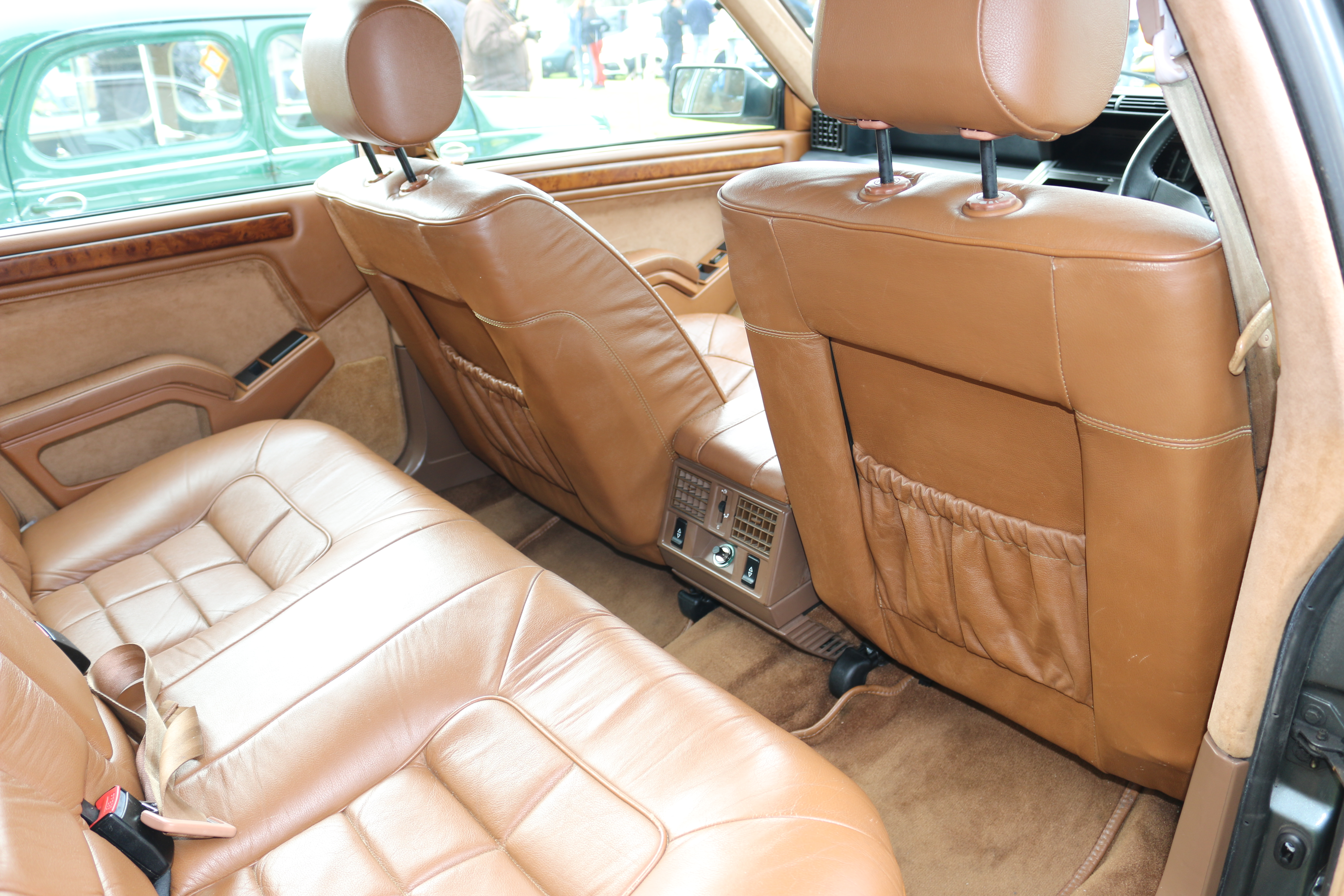
Rear seats

In October 1988, during phase 2, a particularly luxurious finish was made available on the V6 Injection: Baccara, available with Amber leather seats only.

From April 1990 (phase 3), with the appearance of the Euro 1 anti-pollution standard requiring a catalytic converter, this finish was added to the V6 Turbo versions which will also have new electronic management of the turbo among others. Thus the V6 Turbo will see their power increase from 182 to 205 PS (134 to 151 kW), while power dropped from 160 to 153 PS (118 to 113 kW) for the V6 Injection.

The Baccara phase 3 offers as standard: ABS, front and rear electric windows, automatically regulated air conditioning, cruise control, height-adjustable headrests, leather cover for clothes under the rear parcel shelf, colored leather seats Amber or Cinder exclusively, the "Ergomatic" pack (with airbags for the front seats, memory and electrical adjustment of the driver's seat positions), the doors, pillars and roof receive upholstery in Alcantara, door strip and gear lever knob are in real elm burl, the 3-spoke leather steering wheel signed "Baccara". The dashboard is imitation leather.

A spoiler and "Baccara" light alloy rims (BBS spoke rims on V6 Turbo), as well as the "Baccara" monogram on the quarter pillars and the tailgate appear. The shades available are Arabica Brown, Tungsten Gray, Bordeaux Black Sherry, all decorated with a double gold-colored side stripe. Other colors such as Tyrol Green 999, Prussian Blue 447, Black 676 and Persian Red 777 without forgetting the Bleu Sport 449 for the Turbo were offered almost until the end of marketing.

=== Renault 25 Limousine ===
An extended-wheelbase version of the initial Renault 25 was called the Renault 25 Limousine. It was 22.7 centimetres (8.9 in) longer than the standard car and was available in two variants. The standard 25 Limousine had the same rear bench seat as the standard-wheelbase model whereas the Executive version had two individual seats with electric adjustment. The limousine (only available with the 2.7 L V6 for RHD markets) was dropped from the range of Renault UK, within two years of its introduction in 1985, but continued in other European markets.

Coachbuilders, such as Boonaker, provided bulletproof variants as well as fitting 2.5 L V6 Turbo engines. For a time, the President of France used an armored limousine variant of the Renault 25.

=== Renault 25 station wagons ===
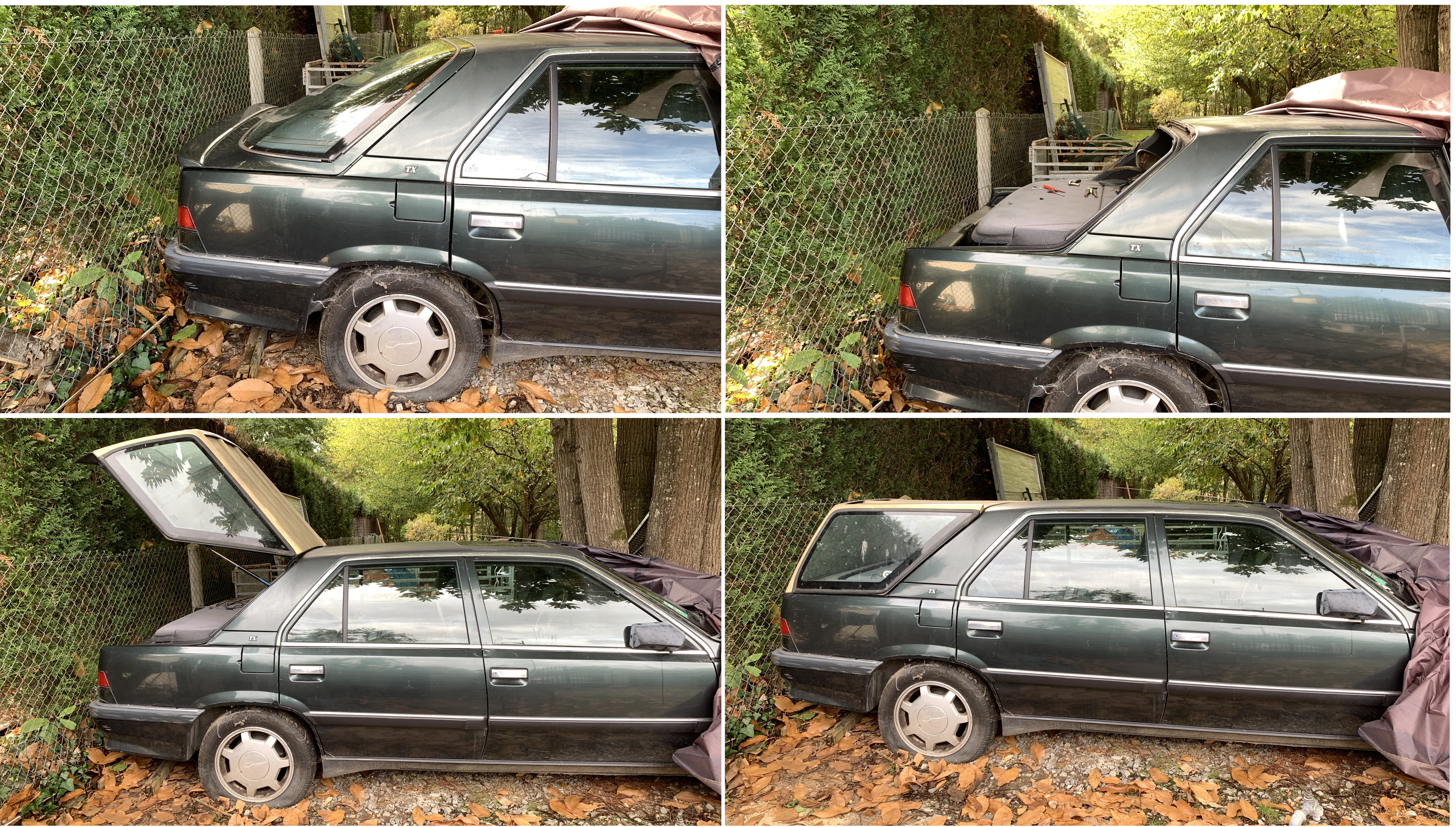
Renault 25 with the EBS kit

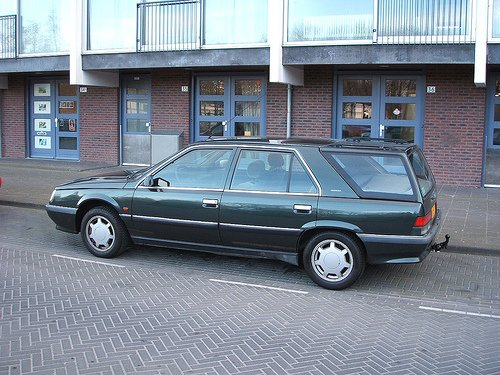
Renault 25 Break by EBS

A station wagon project from coachbuilder Heuliez based on the limousine was proposed to Renault, who refused it. Called the "Sologne", it was never even turned into a prototype.

A kit from the Belgian company EBS (Ernest Berg Systemes) which also produced the R25 Cabriolet, made it possible to quickly transform a Renault 25 into a Renault 25 shooting brake (station wagon) with a rear tailgate.

== Engines ==
(French-market specifications unless indicated otherwise. All hp metric.)

=== Petrol engines ===
- 2.0 L carbureted 8v I4 103 PS (76 kW) TS (1984–92, trim level 1) and GTS (1984–92, trim level 2). Top speed: 182 km/h (113 mph)
- 2.0 L fuel-injected 8v I4 120 PS (88 kW) (107 with catalytic converter on export versions)
  TX (1987–88, trim level 2; 1989–92, trim level 3) and TXE (1990–92, trim level 4) Top speed: 195 km/h (121 mph)
- 2.0 L fuel-injected 12v I4 136 PS (100 kW) TI (1991–92, trim level 3) and TXI (1990–92, trim level 4) Top speed: 203 km/h (126 mph)
- 2.2 L fuel-injected 8v I4 123–126 PS (90–93 kW)
  GTX (1984–89 on all markets, trim level 3; 1990–92 for export only, trim level 4) Top speed: 205 km/h (127 mph)
- 2.2 L fuel-injected 8v I4 110 PS (81 kW)
  GTX (1984–89 on all markets, trim level 3; 1990–92 for export only, trim level 4) Top speed: 189 km/h (117 mph)
- 2.7 L PRV fuel-injected 12v V6 144 PS (106 kW) V6 Injection (1984–88, trim level 4) Top speed: 201 km/h (125 mph)
- 2.8 L PRV fuel-injected 12v V6 160 PS (118 kW) (153 PS (113 kW) with catalytic converter after 1990)
  TX-V6 (1991–92, trim level 3), V6 Injection (1989–92, trim level 4), and Baccara (1989–92, trim level 5) Top speed: 212 km/h (132 mph)
- 2.8 L PRV fuel-injected 12v V6 153 PS (113 kW)
  TX-V6 (1991–92, trim level 3), V6 Injection (1989–92, trim level 4), and Baccara (1989–92, trim level 5) Top speed: 208 km/h (129 mph)
- 2.8 L PRV fuel-injected 12v V6 139 PS (102 kW)
  V6 Injection (1987–88) Top speed: 199 km/h (124 mph)
- 2.5 L PRV fuel-injected 12v V6 turbo 182 PS (134 kW) V6 Turbo (1985–90, trim level 4 with model-specific steering wheel, rims, colour-coded bumpers (not available on any other PH1 car) and grille until 1989). Top speed: 225 km/h (140 mph)
- 2.5 L PRV fuel-injected 12v V6 turbo 205 PS (151 kW) V6 Turbo (1990–92, trim level 4) and V6 Turbo Baccara (1990–92, trim level 5) Top speed: 233 km/h (145 mph)

=== Diesel engines ===
- 2.1 L 8v I4 65 PS (48 kW) TD (1984–88, trim level 1) and GTD (1984–92, trim level 2) Top speed: 155 km/h (96 mph)
- 2.1 L 8v I4 88 PS (65 kW) Turbo-D (1984–92, trim level 3) and Turbo-DX (1984–92, trim level 4 except no express up/down driver window before 1989) Top speed: 172 km/h (107 mph)

== Australia and the United Kingdom ==
The 25 was also exported to Australia. Introduced in 1985, it was priced at A$35,000 without cruise control. It had a disc drum brake setup, rather than four-wheel discs as on the Renault 18.

The R25 was exported to the United Kingdom from the beginning of 1984, where its hatchback body style helped it to stand out compared with conventional saloons.

GTX in the United Kingdom was equivalent to Level 3 in the above list and used the 123 hp (92 kW) 2.2i engine. For the facelift versions the equivalent to the GTX was the TXI, with the 2.0 12v engine of 140 hp (100 kW). The 12v head from the 2.0 engine was latterly used in the J7T 2.2i engine in Safrane. The 2.2 engine in the Safrane is effectively a long-stroke version of the 2.0 engine – with better torque but less free-revving.

For the United Kingdom, the pre-facelift range included TS, Monaco (being a special edition with metallic brown paint, Monaco badging on the boot and C-Pillar insert panels, Leather interior, and some other changes from the TS spec), GTX, V6 and V6 Turbo.

The facelift cars were TX (2.0 12v/2.2i special order), TXI (2.0i 12v/2.2i special order), V6, V6 Turbo for a short period, and Baccara (2.8i V6/2.5i V6 Turbo) which was the top of the range. The 2.2i engine with 123 hp (92 kW) in the Phase 2 cars was only available 'while stocks last'. The lower compression 108 hp (81 kW) 2.2 was not sold in the United Kingdom.

== Eagle Premier/Dodge Monaco ==
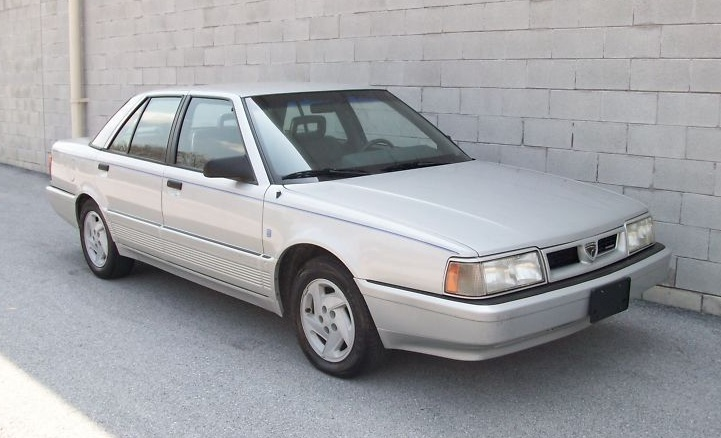
Eagle Premier

The Renault 25 was the basis of the car platform for the Canadian-built, full-sized Eagle Premier that was developed by American Motors Corporation (AMC) and introduced in 1988.

The Premier featured exterior styling by Italdesign Giugiaro using the Renault 25 chassis, although the suspension was derived from the Eagle Medallion (Renault 21). The body was a true 4-door saloon with separate boot lid, rather than a lift-up hatchback. The interior was designed by American Motors.

When introduced, the car was branded as the Eagle Premier, subsequent to Renault selling its 47 percent stake in AMC to Chrysler in 1987. From 1990 to 1992, Chrysler also marketed a rebadged version as the Dodge Monaco.

== Club ==
Throughout the world, there are several clubs concerning this car, particularly in France, such as "Club Renault 25 Français". The club has a large number of parts remanufactured to maintain the Renault 25.
