= Alfa Romeo SZ =

Alfa Romeo SZ Alfa Romeo RZ
- Alfa Romeo SZ

Overview
- Manufacturer: Alfa-Lancia Industriale (1989–1991); Fiat Auto (1991–1994)
- Also called: ES-30 (internal codename); Il Mostro
- Production: 1989–1991 (SZ); 1992–1994 (RZ)
- Assembly: Italy: Terrazzano di Rho (Zagato)
- Designer: Centro Stile Fiat: Robert Opron; Antonio Castellana

Body and chassis
- Class: Sports car (S)
- Body style: 2-door coupé (SZ); 2-door convertible (RZ)
- Layout: Front-engine, rear-wheel-drive
- Related: Alfa Romeo 75

Powertrain
- Engine: 3.0 L (2,959 cc) Busso 12V V6
- Power output: 154 kW (210 PS; 207 hp)
- Transmission: 5-speed manual

Dimensions
- Wheelbase: 2,510 mm (98.8 in)
- Length: 4,060 mm (159.8 in)
- Width: 1,730 mm (68.1 in)
- Height: 1,310 mm (51.6 in) (SZ); 1,300 mm (51.2 in) (RZ)
- Curb weight: 1,260 kg (2,778 lb) (SZ); 1,380 kg (3,042 lb) (RZ)

The Alfa Romeo SZ (for Sprint Zagato) and codenamed ES-30 for Experimental Sportscar 3.0 litre, is a high-performance limited-production sports car built from 1989 to 1991 by a partnership between Centro Stile Zagato, Centro Stile Alfa Romeo and Centro Stile Fiat. It was unveiled as the ES-30 at the 1989 Geneva Motor Show as a prototype by Zagato with the styling house assigned the responsibility of assembling the car.

== Overview ==
The SZ was an attempt to revive Alfa Romeo's sporting heritage after its acquisition by Fiat in 1986, and was meant to recall the Giulietta Sprint Zagato from the late 1950s and early 1960s. A common misconception about the SZ is that the car was designed by Zagato, but was actually designed in-house. Robert Opron of the Centro Stile Fiat was responsible for the initial sketches while Antonio Castellana was largely responsible for the final styling details and interior. Only Zagato's 'Z' logo of was kept on the design, with Zagato's signature double bubble roof being absent. An unusual design detail is its six headlights positioned in a trio on each side - a feature used also on later Alfa Romeo models in the 2000s. The unusual design of the car can be attributed to the use of early CAD/CAM, or computer-aided design and manufacturing by Alfa Romeo.

The car's powertrain and chassis came from the Alfa Romeo 75, with assembly being carried out by Zagato at Terrazzano di Rho near the Alfa Romeo factory in Arese. The thermoplastic injection-moulded composite body panels were produced by Italian company Carplast and French company Stratime Cappelo Systems.

The suspension was from the Alfa Romeo 75 group A/IMSA car, modified by Giorgio Pianta, engineer and team manager of the Lancia and Fiat rally works team. The hydraulic damper system was by Koni. The SZ was originally equipped with Pirelli P Zero tyres (front 205/55 ZR 16, rear 225/50 ZR 16). The car came without any driver's aids to provide a challenging experience to the drivers.

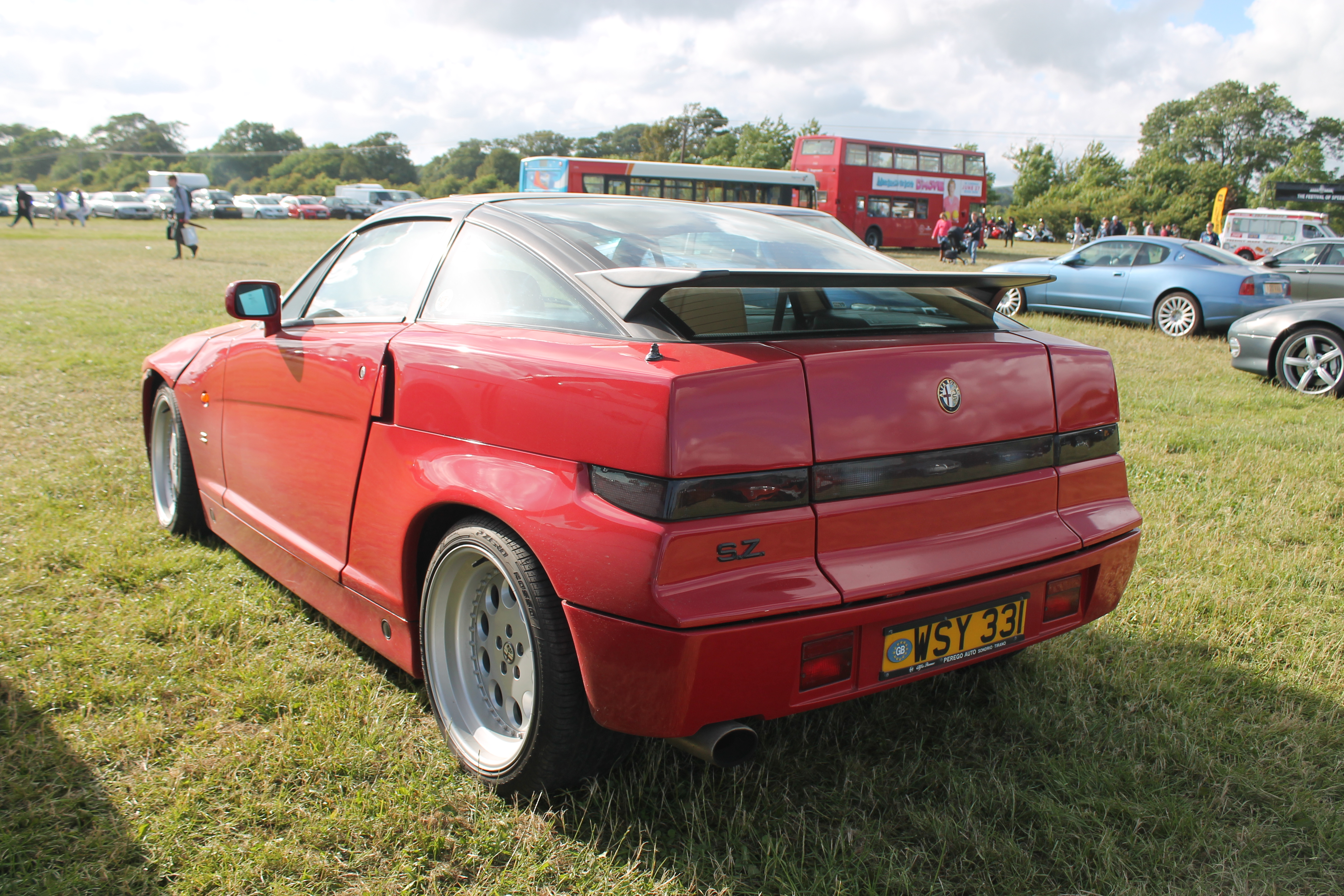
Rear view of the SZ

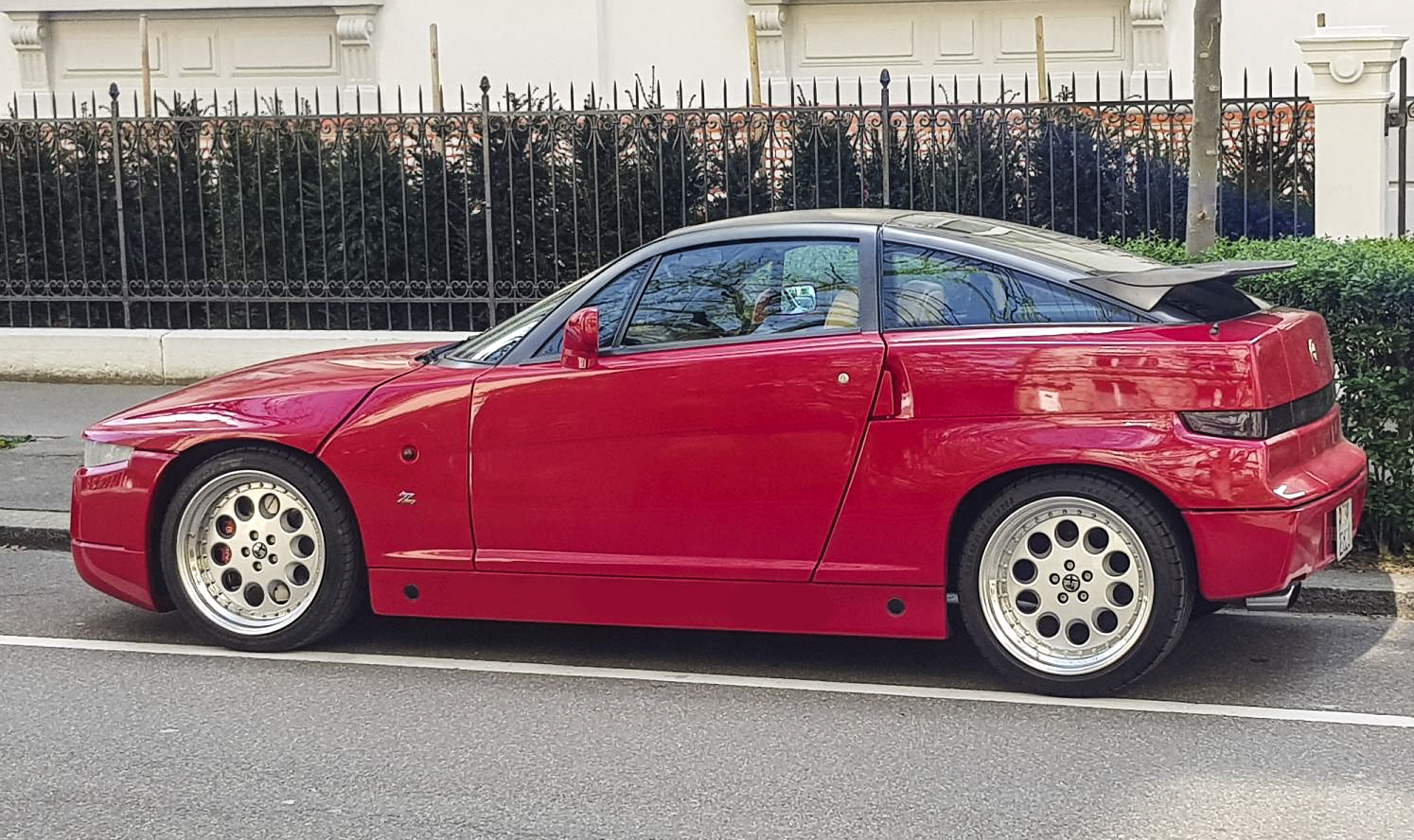
Side profile of the SZ

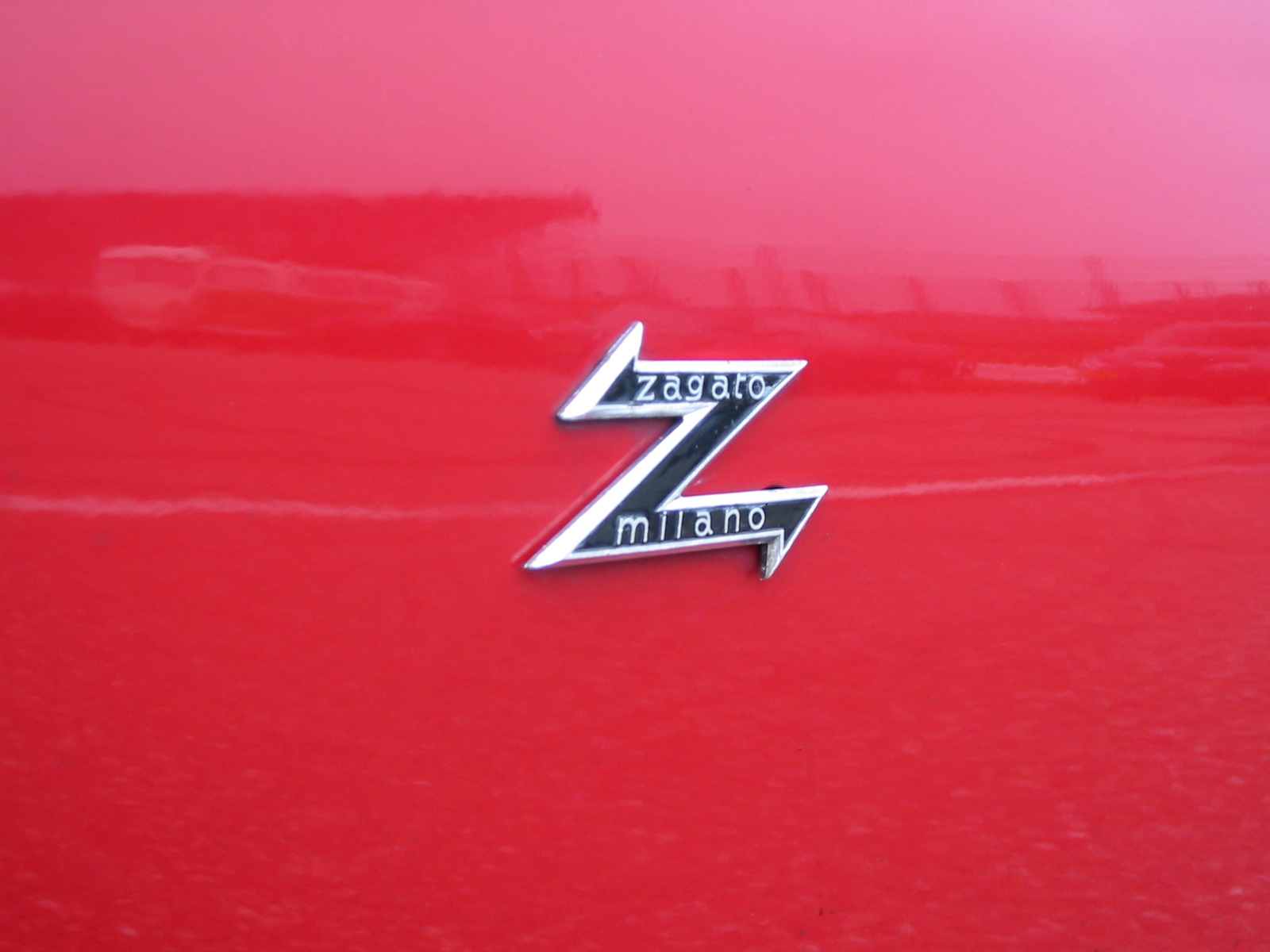
The Zagato badging on the SZ

=== RZ ===
A convertible version of the SZ called the RZ (badged "R.Z." for Roadster Zagato) was produced from 1992 until December 1994. Although almost identical in appearance, the two cars shared no body panels save for the front wings and boot. The RZ had a revised bumper and door sills to give better ground clearance and the bonnet no longer featured the aggressive ridges. Three standard colours were available; black, yellow and red, with black and yellow being more popular choices. Yellow and red cars got a black leather interior and black cars burgundy. Although the interior layout was almost unchanged from the SZ, the RZ had a painted central console that swept up between the seats to conceal the convertible roof storage area. 350 units were planned, but production was halted after 252 units when the Zagato factory producing the cars for Alfa Romeo went into receivership. A further 32 cars were completed under the control of the receivers before production finished at 284 units. Of those, three RZs were painted silver with burgundy interior and the final RZ was painted pearlescent white.

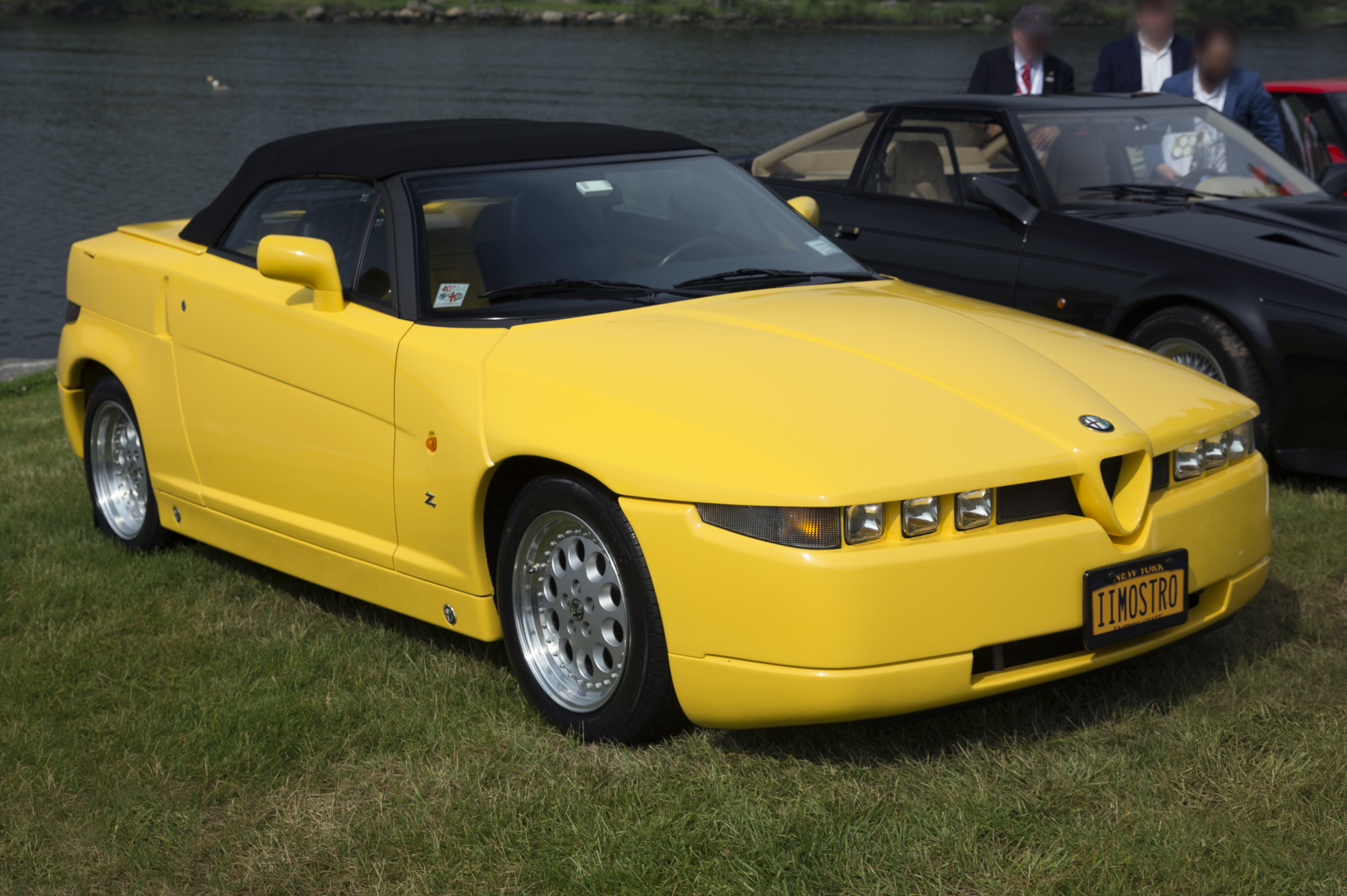
Alfa Romeo RZ

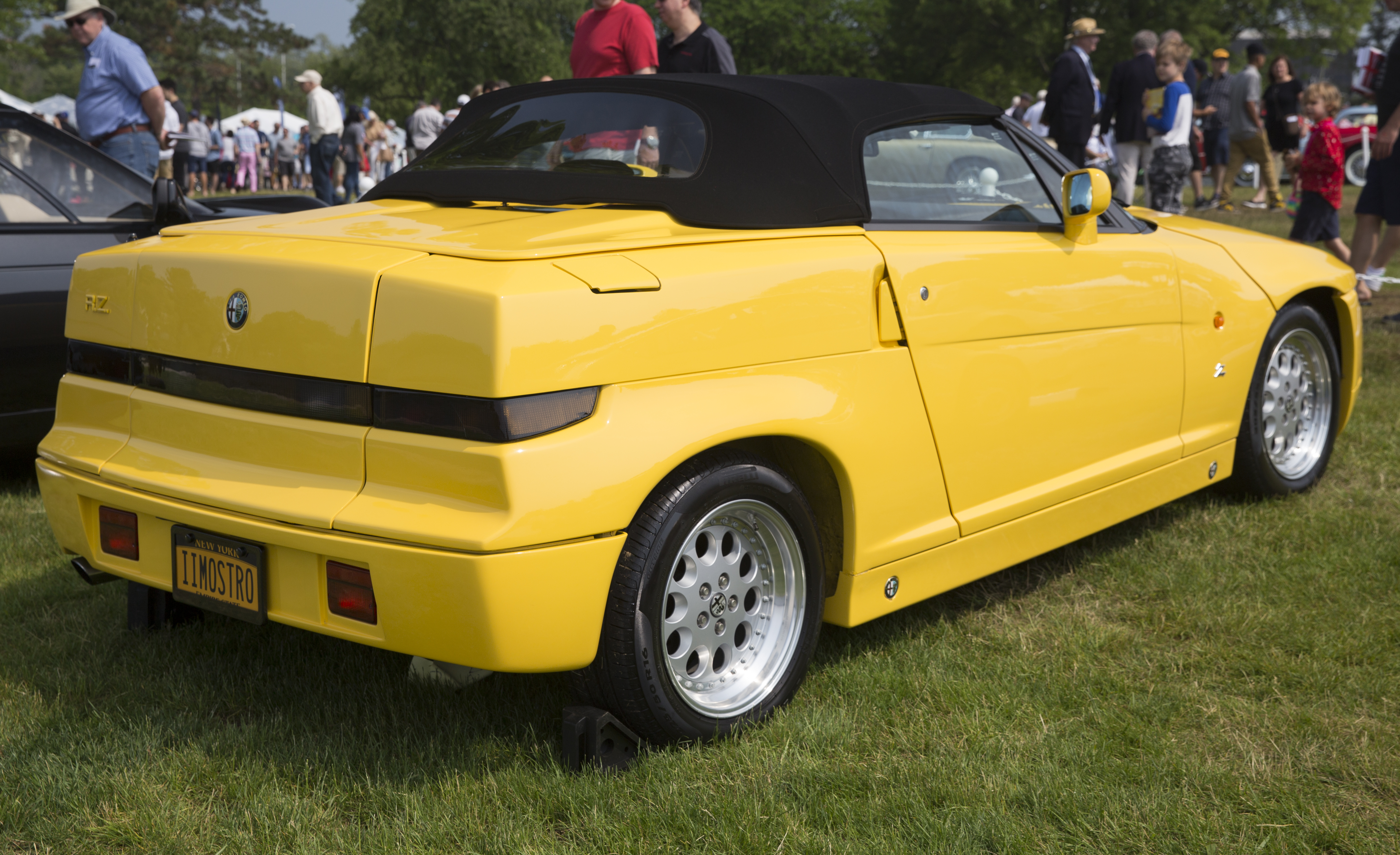
Rear view of the RZ

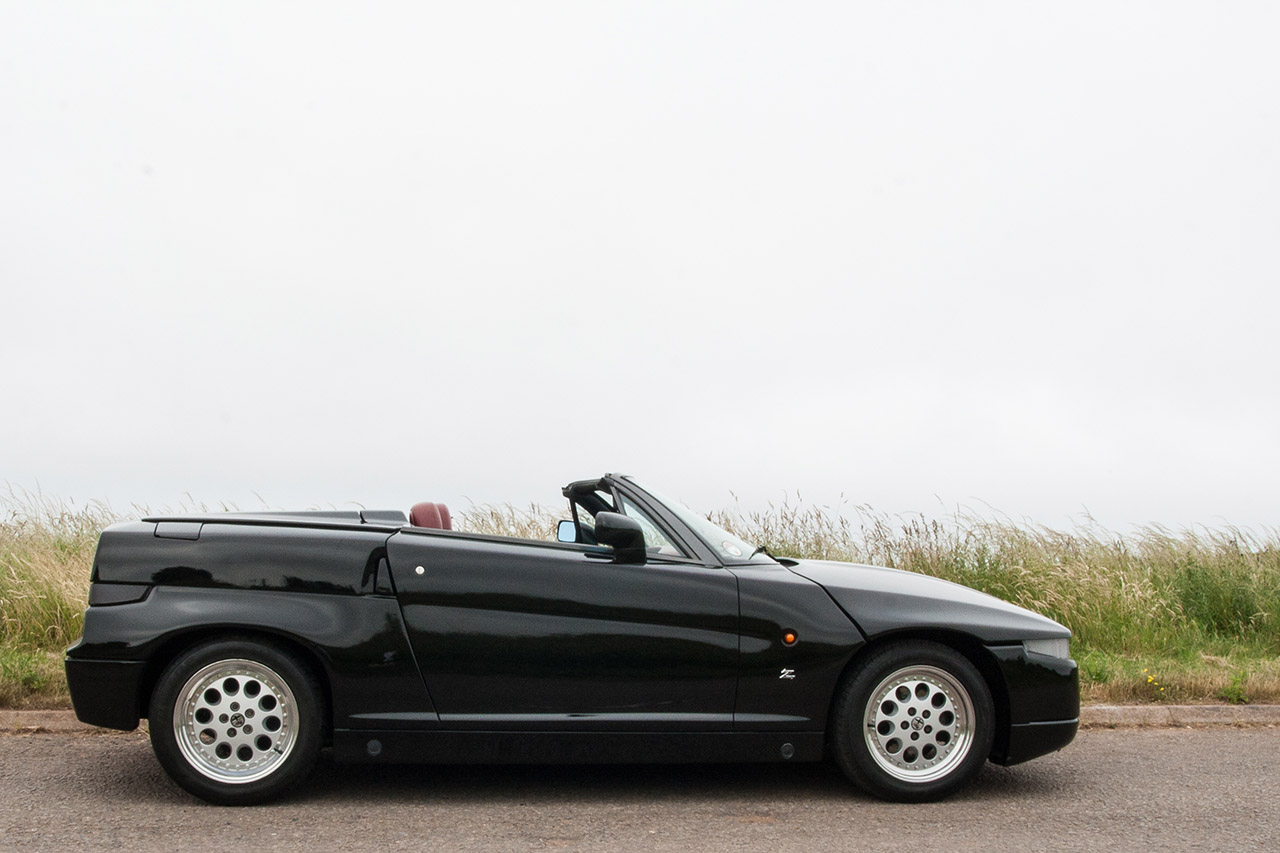
Side profile of the RZ

Performance
	SZ	RZ
Top speed	245 km/h (152 mph)	230 km/h (143 mph)
0–100 km/h (62 mph)	7.0 seconds	7.5 seconds
0–1000 m	27.4 seconds	30.1 seconds
Power to weight ratio	6 kg/PS	6.6 kg/PS

== Characteristics ==
- Powerplant: 2,959 cc (3.0 L; 180.6 cu in) naturally aspirated V6. SOHC, 2 valves per cylinder, Bosch Motronic ML 4.1 fuel injection. Rated at 154 kW (210 PS) at 6,200 rpm and 245 N⋅m (181 lb⋅ft) of torque at 4,500 rpm. Engine code: AR 61501
- SZ : Only one official colour scheme was available: red with grey roof, tan leather interior
- One SZ with a black exterior colour was made for Andrea Zagato
- RZ : Only three official colour schemes were available: red with black leather, yellow with black leather, and black with red leather
- At the end of production, three RZs were made in silver, and one in pearlescent white
- 1,036 SZs were produced, exceeding planned production of 1,000 units. About 100 were exported to Japan.
- 278 RZs were produced of a planned production of 350 units.

== Motorsport ==
=== SZ Trofeo ===
The SZ Trofeo is a modified version of the SZ built for a single-model race series run on circuits throughout Europe, but primarily in Italy at venues such as Imola, Misano, and Mugello. Only 13 cars were built, with most finished in red, and at least one was black. Wheels are 16 inch OZ three-piece items fitted with Pirelli tires, of which each team received three sets. The interior is largely stripped, but retains the dash and door panels, consistent with era regulations. The engine is largely identical to those used in road-going versions of the SZ and RZ, but with balanced internals and different tuning.

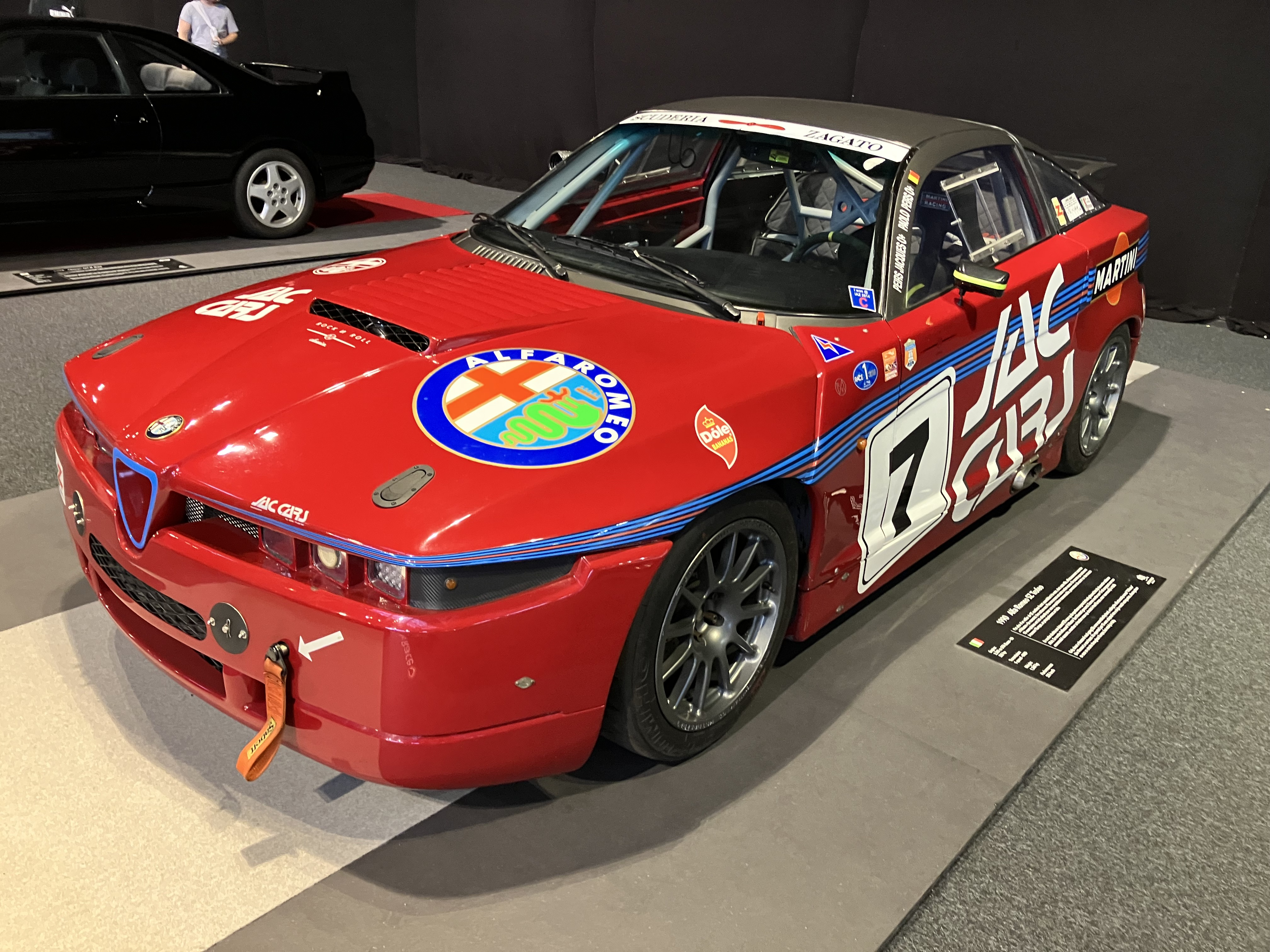

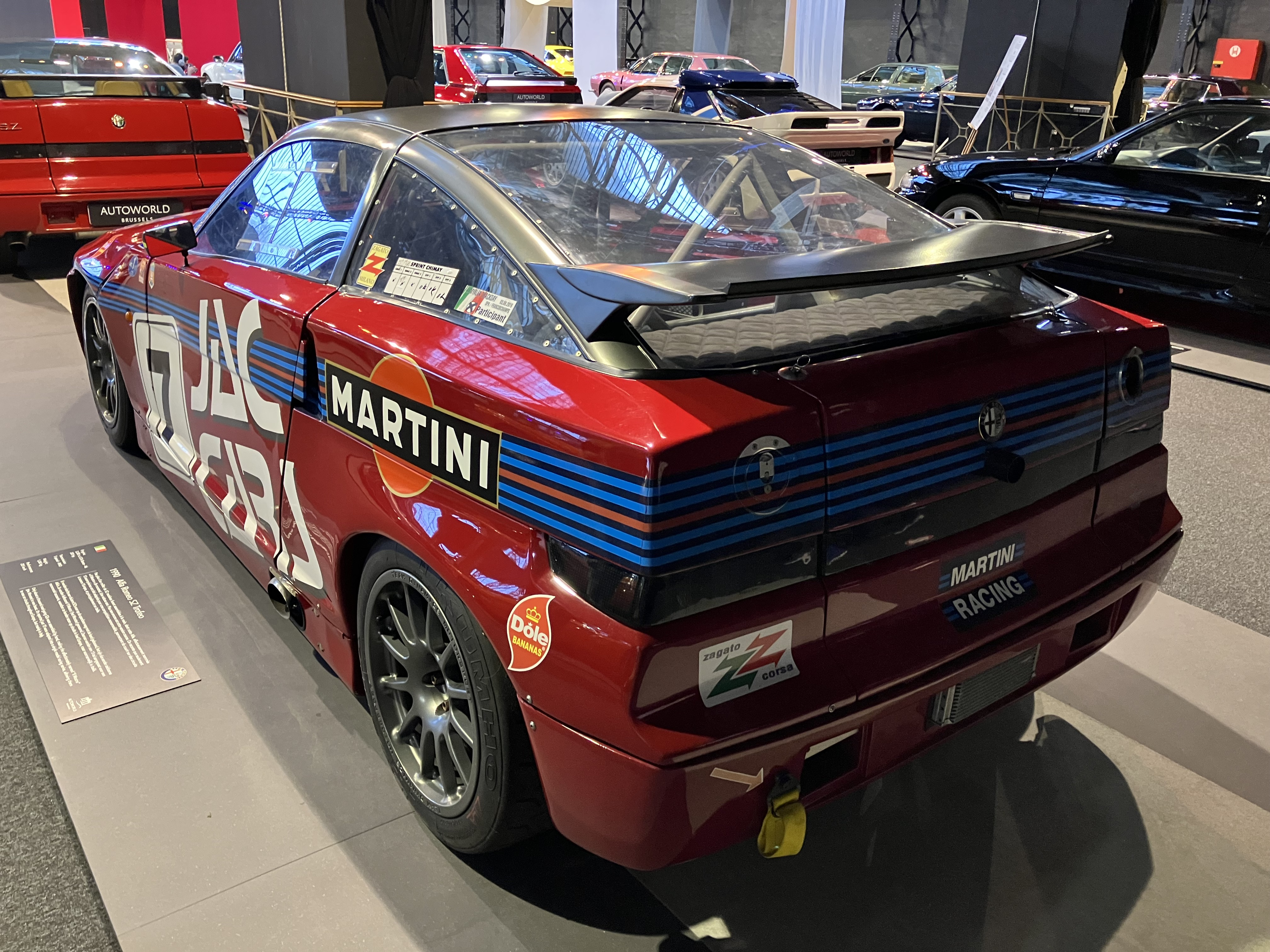
