= Robert Opron =

French car designer (1932–2021)

- Born: Robert Maurice Jean Opron; 22 February 1932; Amiens, France
- Died: 29 March 2021 (aged 89); Antony, Hauts-de-Seine, France
- Occupation: Car designer

Robert Maurice Jean Opron (22 February 1932 – 29 March 2021) was a French automotive designer. He developed or collaborated on numerous projects that became production cars for brands that included Simca, Renault, and Fiat. He is best known for his work at Citroën, which he joined in 1962 and where he became responsable de style (head of the design department) in 1964.

== Biography ==
Opron was born in Amiens in Picardy, France. His father was in the military and received several postings to locations in French Colonial Africa, so Opron grew up in places like Algeria, Mali, and Abidjan.

At 18 years old, Opron contracted tuberculosis and had to recuperate in a sanatorium. He returned to France in 1952 and enrolled in the École des Beaux-Arts in Amiens; one year later, he transferred to the École nationale supérieure des Beaux-Arts in Paris. He studied architecture under Auguste Perret. Altogether, Opron spent eight years studying architecture, painting, and sculpture.

At age 21, he married Geneviève Mercier. In the early 1950s, Opron's interest in aircraft led him to take up flying, including acrobatic flying.

In 1952, Opron began his professional career as a machine designer for the Compagnie Nationale des Sucreries in Ham, a small commune in the Somme department, northern France. In 1954, he was hired by aircraft builder Société Nationale de Constructions Aéronautices du Nord. He specialized in cockpit design and worked on the Nord Noratlas aircraft.

Opron began working at Simca in 1958 at age 26. His department was eliminated in 1961. Opron received a two-year severance payout along with a non-compete clause preventing him from moving to another automaker. Instead, Opron went to Arthur Martin, which is now part of Electrolux. He became Director of Style for major and small appliances from 1960 to 1962, a period he described without pleasure. Opron returned to automotive design with Citroën in 1962.

Over the course of his career, Opron became known for balancing a collaborative, team-based approach to design with creative input from individuals. He finally retired from design work in 2001.

Opron died from complications of COVID-19 on 29 March 2021, in Antony near Paris.

== Awards and recognition ==
Opron was one of twenty-five designers nominated for the 1999 Car Designer of the Century competition. A celebration of his work, OPRON 50 Years of Style, was held on 11 May 2002 in Verrières-le-Buisson on the occasion of his 70th birthday. He received Car Design News' Lifetime Achievement Award in 2016.

== Design history ==
The dolphin, the leopard, the swift, they each move at a speed consistent with their environment, each using a minimum of energy. What a great lesson for a stylist.

— Robert Opron,

All of Opron's car designs have an organic wholeness, as if they have been grown or shaped by the forces of wind, light, scale, and structure. Many agree that one of the signatures of an Opron design is the way it will catch the light, and that it has a dynamic graphical element – movement being intrinsic in its shape even at rest.

— Lance Cole, author,

=== Simca ===
Having joined Simca in 1958, his first significant project for them was designing the 1959 Simca Chambord Présidence V8 cabriolet used by French president Charles De Gaulle.

In 1959, Opron unveiled the futuristic Simca Fulgur concept car. This bubble-topped design was Opron's response to a challenge from the magazine Journal de Tintin to design a car for the 1980s. The magazine supplied a list of anticipated standard features, including radar obstacle detection and gyroscopic stabilization. Opron consulted with an astrophysicist friend to help integrate these not-yet-realized concepts into the car.

While at Simca, he sketched out a two-box hatchback that caught the attention of Fiat's designers. This sketch eventually led to the Simca 1100.

Another sketch by Opron at Simca has been suggested to have been the original concept for what later became the Renault Espace. Others dispute this claim. The design of the Espace is generally credited to Fergus Pollock. In the late 1970s Matra designer Antoine Volanis addressed the need for a replacement for the Matra Rancho by designing an MPV using Simca parts and with input from Opron. This design was presented to PSA management in 1979 as "Project P16", but did not reach production. Opron was at Renault throughout most of the Espace's development and for one year after sales started.

=== Citroën ===
In 1962, Mme. Opron-Mercier noticed an advertisement in Le Monde saying that an "Important industrial group" was looking to hire an experienced designer. Opron responded to the ad and was directed to report to the Quai de Javel, the home of Citroën. The personnel manager asked Opron to return later that day to the Bureau d'Études on the Rue du Théâtre to meet with Flaminio Bertoni, Citroën's chief designer and originator of the 2CV and DS.

When Opron arrived for the meeting with Bertoni, the older man asked to see Opron's portfolio of drawings. Opron recalled that Bertoni "threw them on the floor, poking them with his cane and stated that he did not think much of them." Opron collected his drawings and indicated that he found Bertoni's behavior unacceptable, to which Bertoni replied "I do find you interesting though!" Opron left, vowing to never work for such a man. Three weeks later, he received a letter of appointment from Citroën.

Opron joined Citroën's Bureau d'Études in 1962. For the first three months, he worked in the "Méthodes" section.

Opron became Citroën's Responable de Style, or chief stylist, in 1964 following the death of Bertoni.

Opron was tasked with developing a replacement for the 2CV, which evolved into the 1965 Citroën G-Mini design study.

In 1965, Citroën launched new lines of 3.5–8.0 t (4–9 short tons) trucks, the 350 and 600 series, which earned the nickname Belphégor for their unique cab design. The trucks were designed by Bertoni and Opron.

Opron began working on the second restyling of the Citroën DS as early as 1963 with Projet D29. His "Nouveau Visage" (new face) front, appearing on the 1968 model year DS, was a four-headlamp design with two lamps on each side under glass covers that blended with the body's lines. The inner headlamp on each side pivoted with the steering wheel, while the outer lamps were self-leveling.

In 1967, having abandoned the ambitious Projet F begun by Bertoni and taken over by Opron, Citroën initiated a competition for a new mid-range model that pitted Opron and the Bureau d'Études against Giorgetto Giugiaro and Italdesign. Both teams submitted designs for front wheel drive three- and five-door cars powered by flat-four engines. Opron's proposal carried the day, and his Project G eventually became the GS released in 1970. Some have claimed that Opron based the GS' shape on the Pininfarina Austin 1800 Aerodinamica Berline of 1967. Others assert that, while it may have been influenced by the Italo-English concept car, Opron's design was an independent work, and point out that Citroën has never acknowledged any link. Giugiaro's rejected design was taken up by Alfa Romeo and developed into the Alfasud.

In 1968, Citroën opened a new Centre d'Études at Vélizy, France. Opron oversaw the arrangements for the move, which was completed progressively over several years.

Opron refreshed the Ami 6 to create the Ami 8 of 1969. He also led the team that developed the Citroën M35, a two-door fastback based on the Ami 8 chassis that was powered by a single rotor Comotor engine. Production ran from 1969 until 1971. Although 500 M35s were planned to be built, the total number is believed to be just more than half that.

The first completely new model of the Opron era, and the car he is most closely associated with, was the SM. Assigned the development name Projet S, the original goal was to produce a racing car suitable for Le Mans. Through the influence of Opron and Pierre Bercot, Citroën's managing director, it evolved from a racing car into a premium model in the old Grand Routier tradition.

The SM team, which included Jean Giert, built a full-scale model in the Bureau d'Études workshops on the Rue du Théâtre, making the SM the last model developed in this location before the last of the style department moved to their new location in Vélizy.

A design for a possible GS-based coupé progressed to the full-scale model stage. The car was to be built by Ligier when their contract to assemble the SM expired in 1974–1975, but did not go into production.

The project that was Opron's personal favorite was also his last design for Citroën. Initially called Projet L, the result was the CX, which debuted in 1974 as the successor to the DS.

When Citroën declared bankruptcy in 1974, the French Government stepped in and arranged a merger of Citroën with Peugeot. Opron left shortly after this.

=== Renault ===
In 1975, Opron started work at Renault after reportedly being the target of an executive search by them. For his new employers, he led the redesign of the Alpine A310, a project that stylist Peter Stevens was also involved in. The original four-cylinder A310 was modified to accommodate the V6 PRV engine, and to address some aerodynamic deficiencies of the original shape.

Opron developed a design for an ultra-compact city car called the Véhicule Bas de Gamme (VBG), or Entry Level Vehicle. He was also involved in the Vesta II concept car of 1987, along with designer Gaston Juchet.

Opron's designs at Renault included the Renault Fuego sports coupé of 1980, as well as the Renault 9 and 11, with the 9 sedan released in 1981 and the 11 hatchback in 1983. Opron worked with American Motors's designer Dick Teague to adapt the 9 and 11 models to the American market, where they were marketed by AMC as the Renault Alliance and Encore respectively. When introduced, the Renault Alliance was selected Motor Trend magazine's 1983 Car of the Year and also listed as one of 1983's "10Best" by Car and Driver magazine.

Opron's tenure at Renault was marked by extensive collaborations with other well-known designers and carrosserie. Marcello Gandini influenced the shape of the 25 of 1983, and produced the shape for the Super Cinq in 1984. An association with Giugiaro and Italdesign resulted in the Renault Gabbiano of 1983, and later the Renault 21 of 1986 and Renault 19 of 1988.

In May 1977, Opron sent a letter to François Zanotti, director of Renault's commercial division, proposing a new line of commercial trucks, and included two sketches by designer Guy Greffier. Zanotti approved further development, and Greffier refined his original sketches. As the project progressed, Opron invited Gandini to join the design effort. The result was the Renault AE Magnum truck line released in 1990, when it also won the "European Truck of the Year" award.

Opron wanted to establish a center of advanced styling in the United States. He spent time in the States working to that end, but it did not materialize. When he returned to Europe, he found changes underway in Renault's leadership.

Opron left Renault in 1985.

=== Fiat ===
After Renault Opron moved to Centro Stile at Fiat, where he was put in charge of advanced studies.

He is credited with creating the earliest sketches for a design project called the ES 30, for Experimental Sportscar 3.0 litres. Opron's early concept, which won out against a competing proposal from Giugiaro, was fully developed by Antonio Castellana. The prototype was completed in just nineteen months – quickly enough to appear at the 1989 Geneva Motor Show. This highly controversial design went into limited production as the Alfa Romeo SZ coupé and the later RZ convertible, where the "Z" refers to coachbuilder Zagato. The model was also nicknamed "Il Mostro" (the monster) for its unusual appearance.

In 1992, Opron left Fiat at sixty years of age, having reached mandatory retirement age.

=== Independent consultant ===
From 1991 to 2000, he operated his own independent design consultancy in Verrières-le-Buisson, south of Paris (Essonne).

One of Opron's clients was Ligier, who had become a manufacturer of "voitures sans permis" or "voiturettes", a class of microcar in France that may be driven without an operator's license. For Ligier, Opron produced the original Dué, which debuted at the 1998 Paris Motor Show. The Ligier Dragonfly shown at the 2000 Geneva Motor Show was also an Opron design.

Opron also consulted for Piaggio.

== Design gallery ==
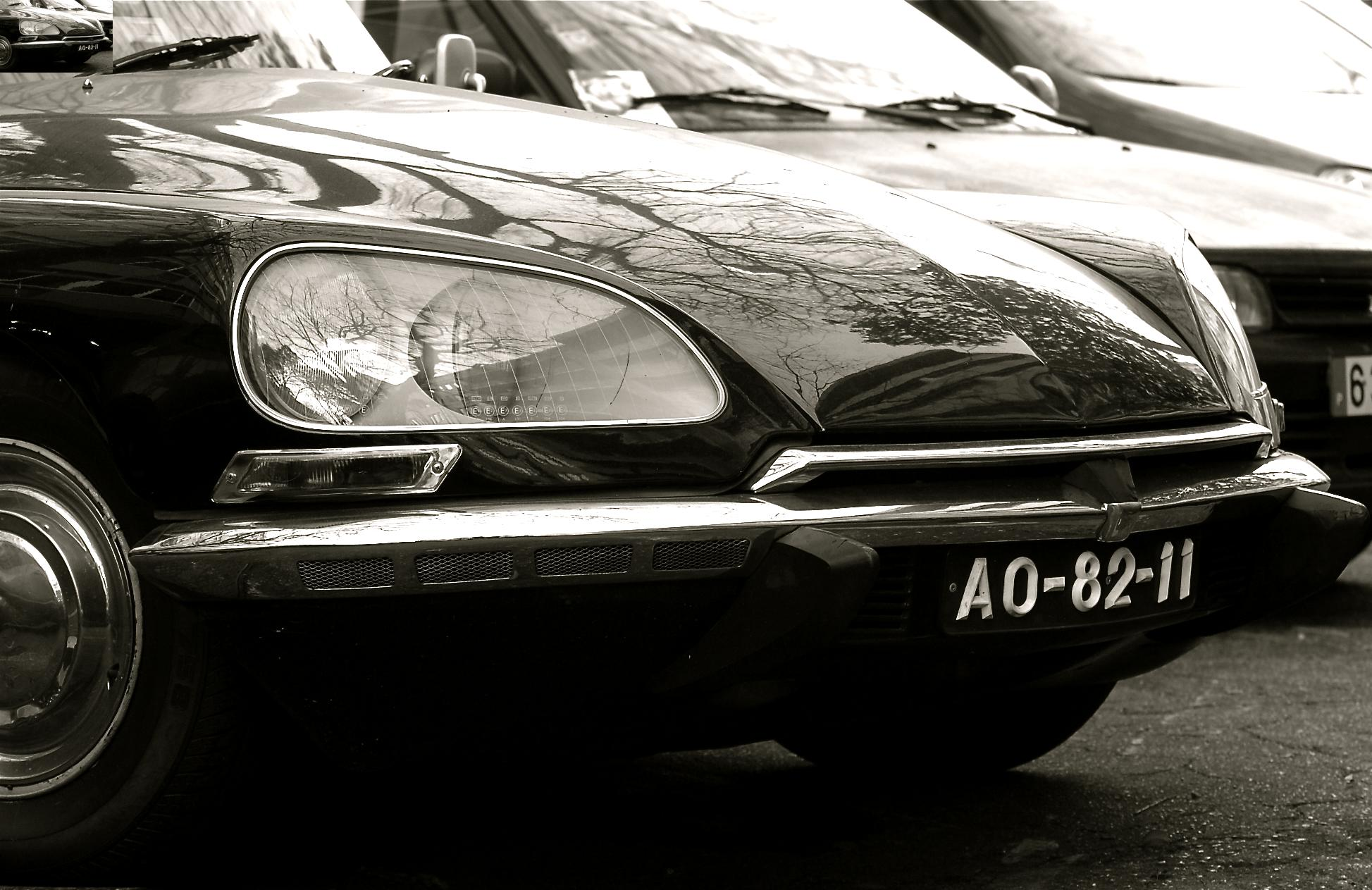
Citroën DS (1967) "Nouveau Visage"

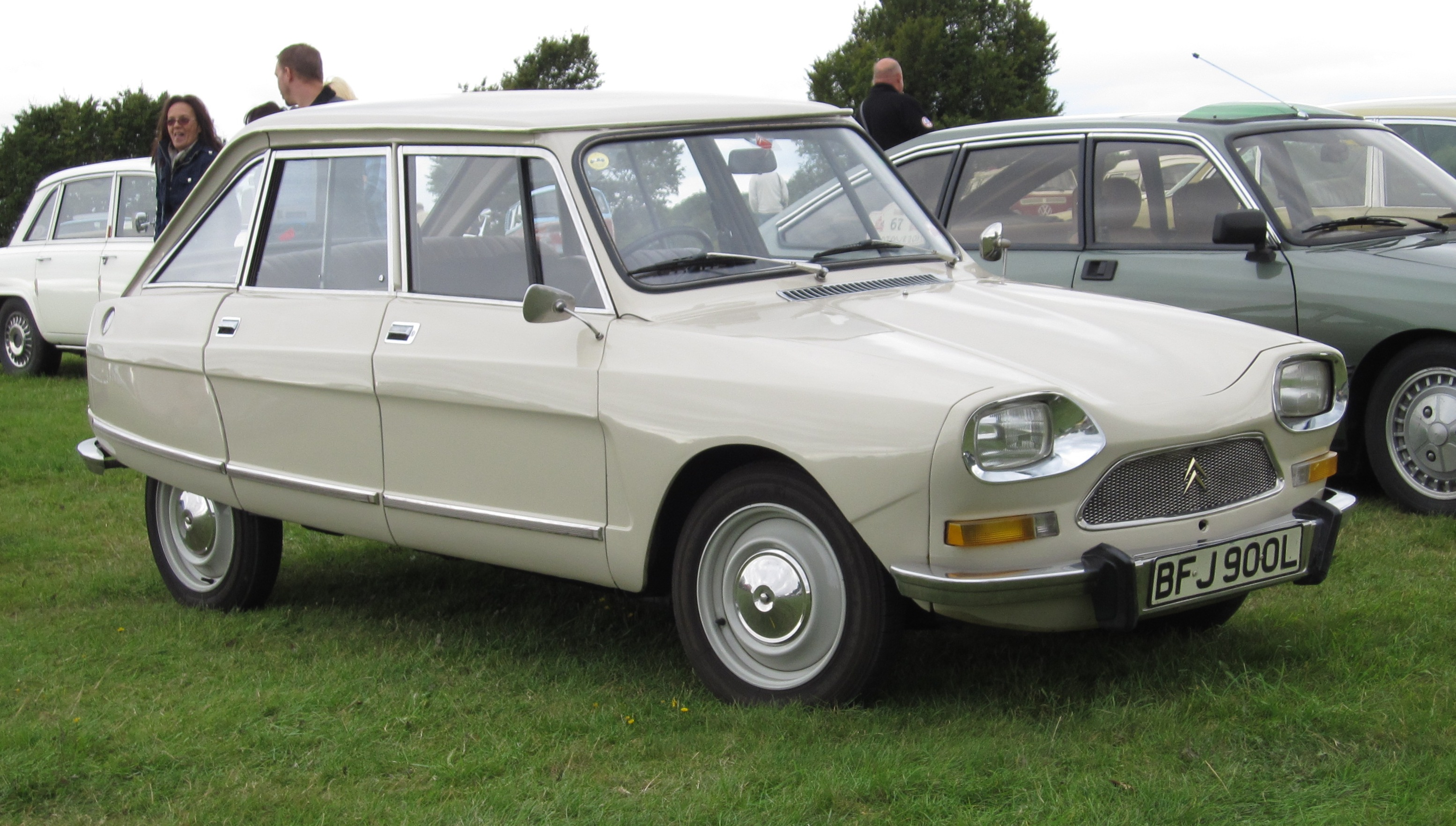
Citroën Ami 8 (1969)

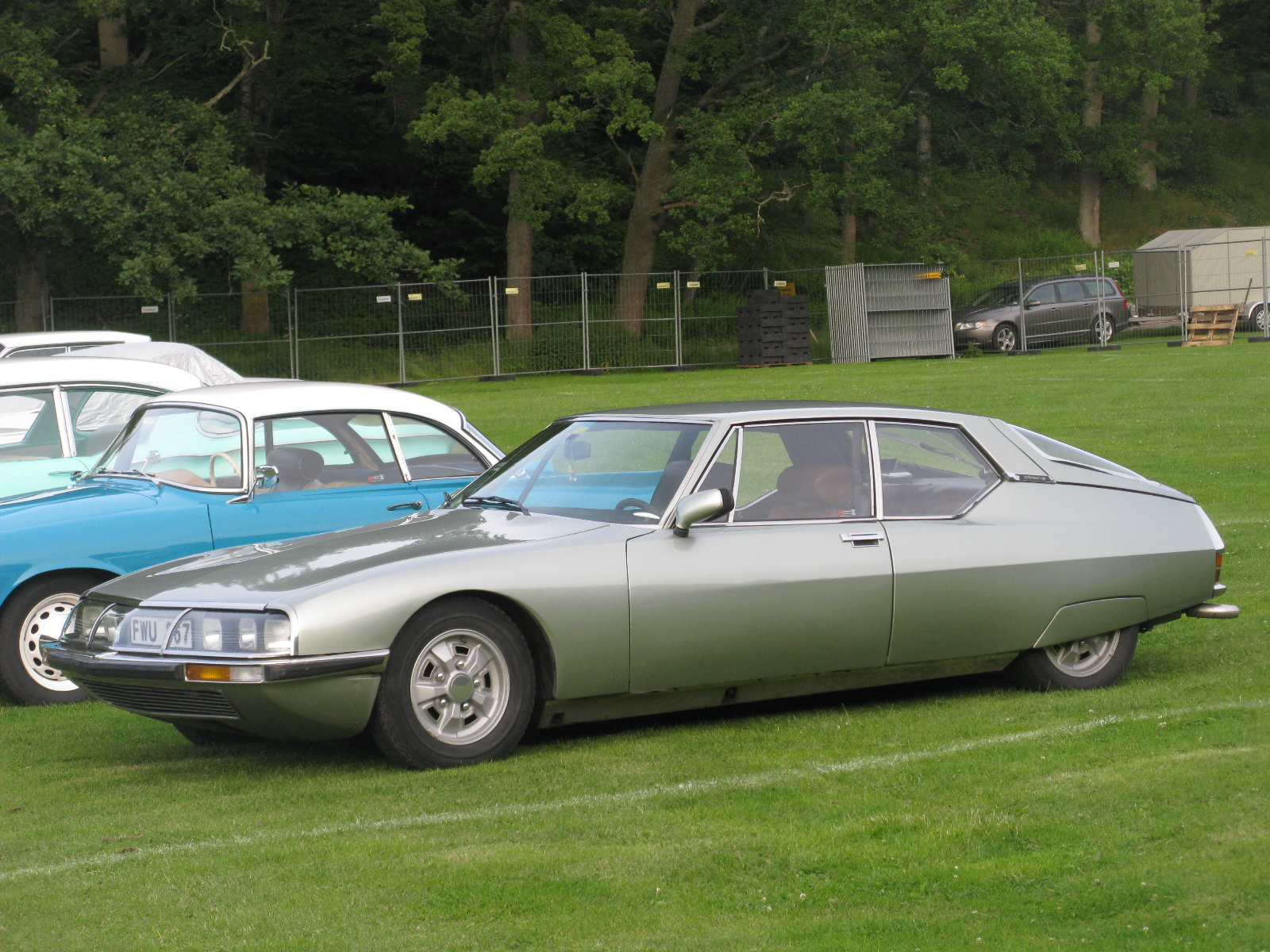
Citroën SM (1970) 1972 Motor Trend Car of the Year

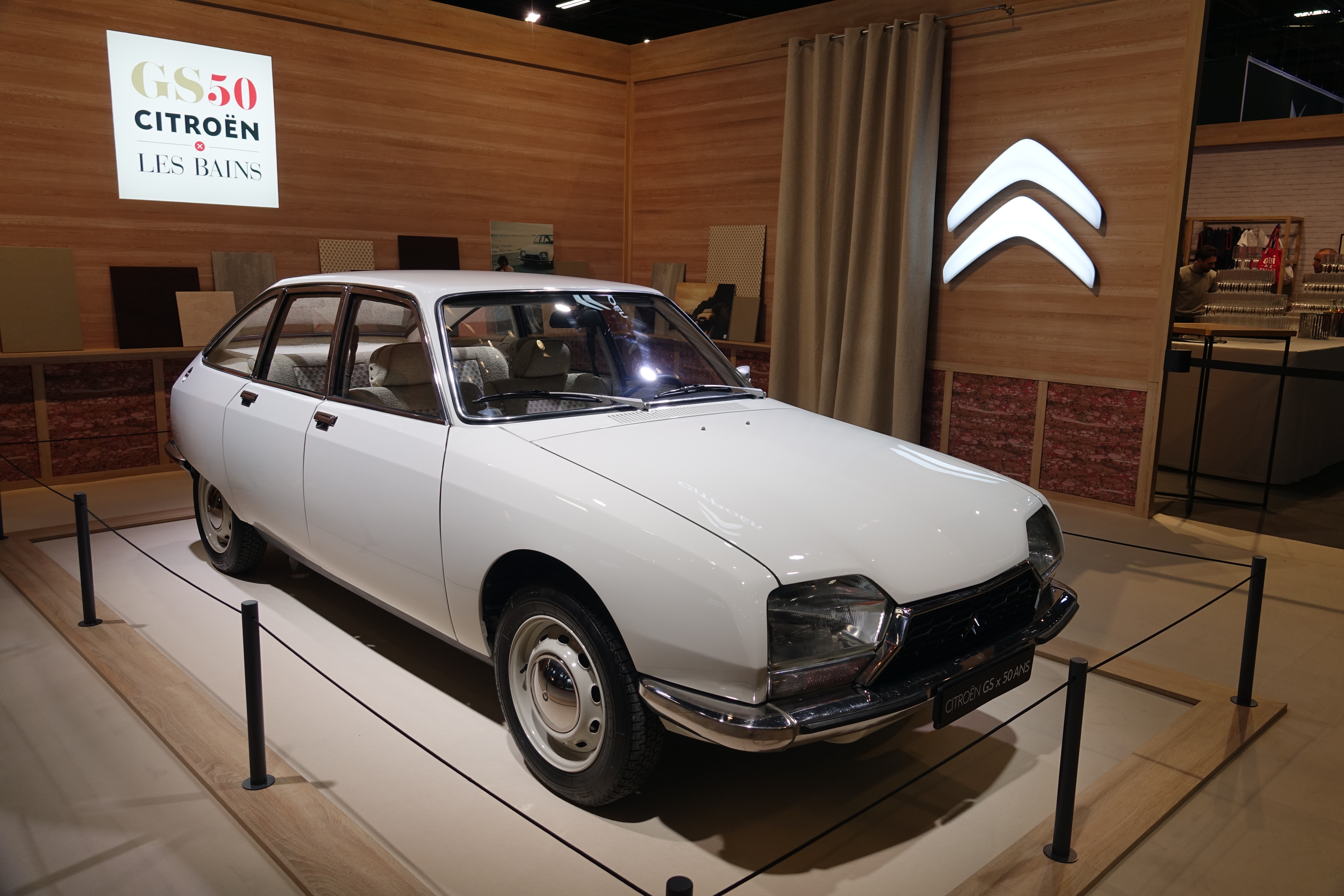
Citroën GS (1970) 1971 European Car of the Year.

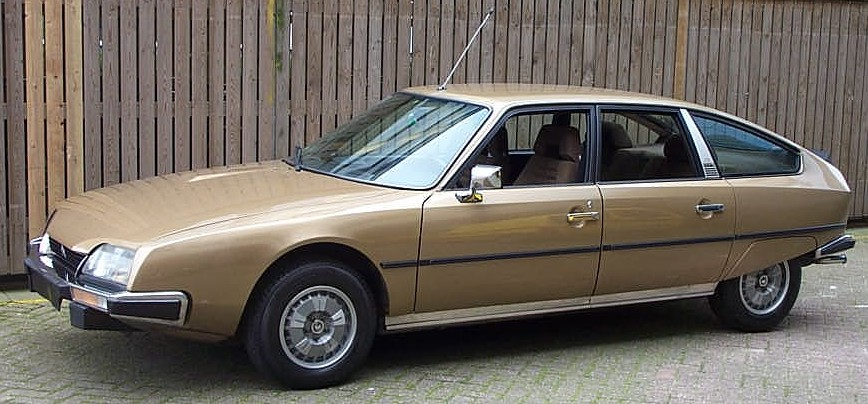
Citroën CX (1974) 1975 European Car of the Year

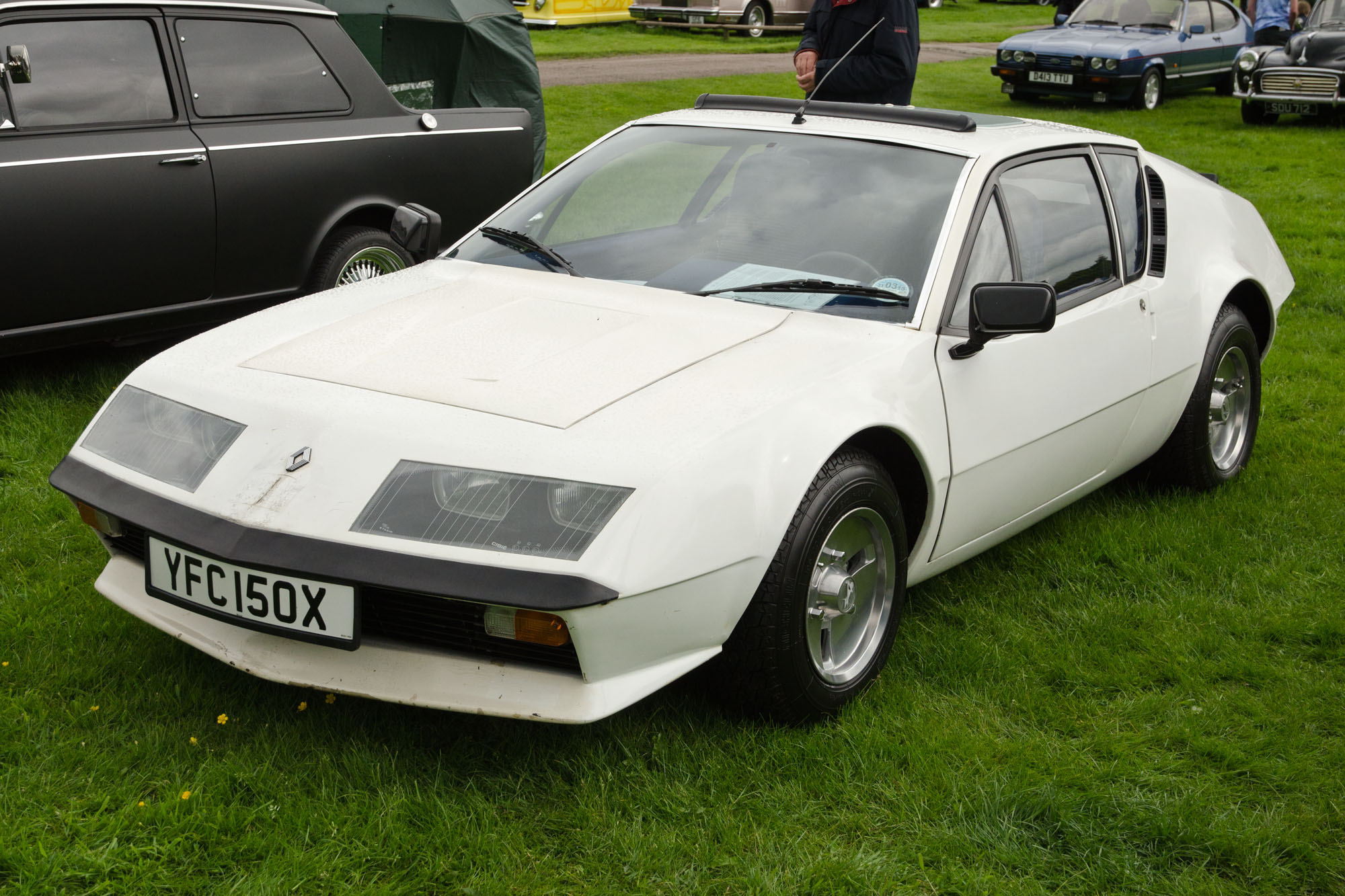
Renault Alpine A310 V6 (1976)

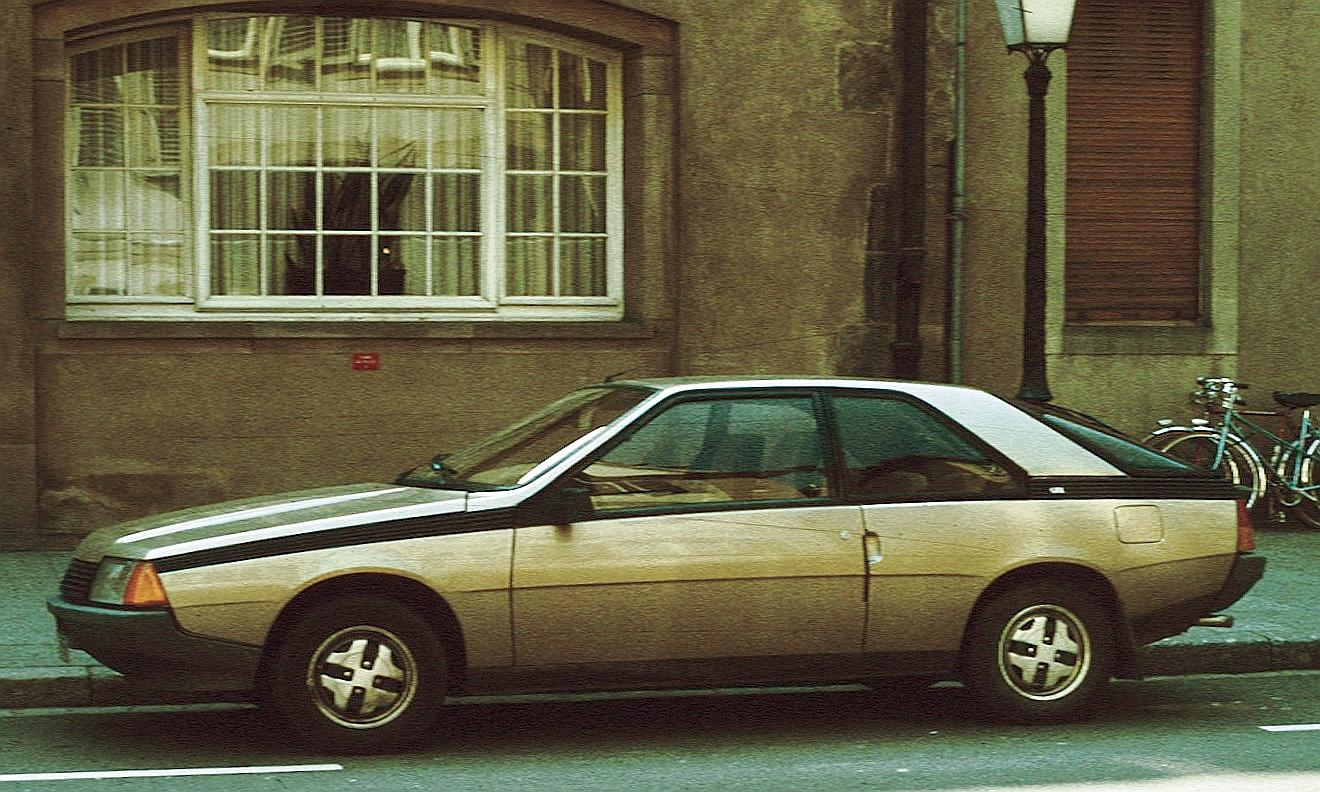
Renault Fuego (1980)

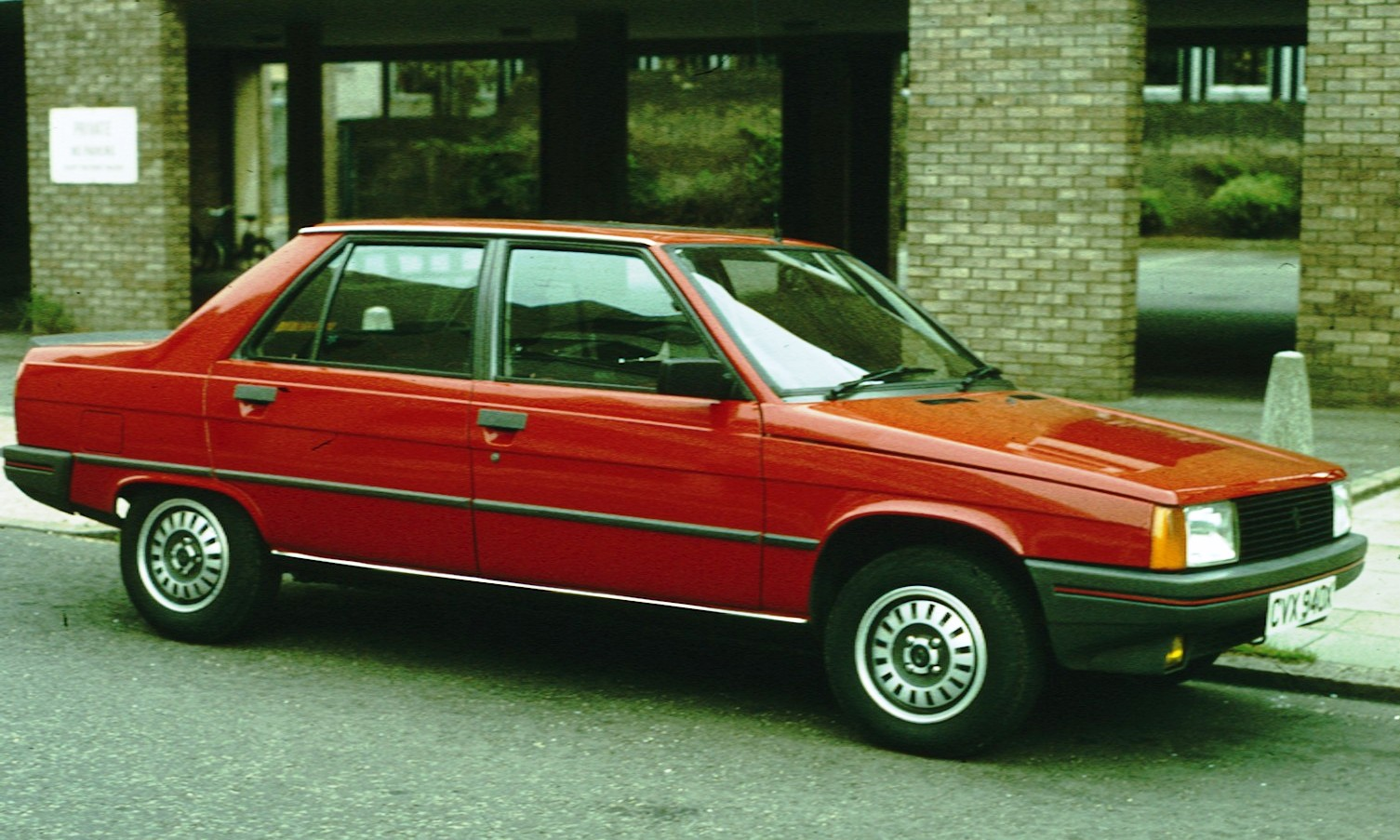
Renault 9 (1981) 1982 European Car of the Year

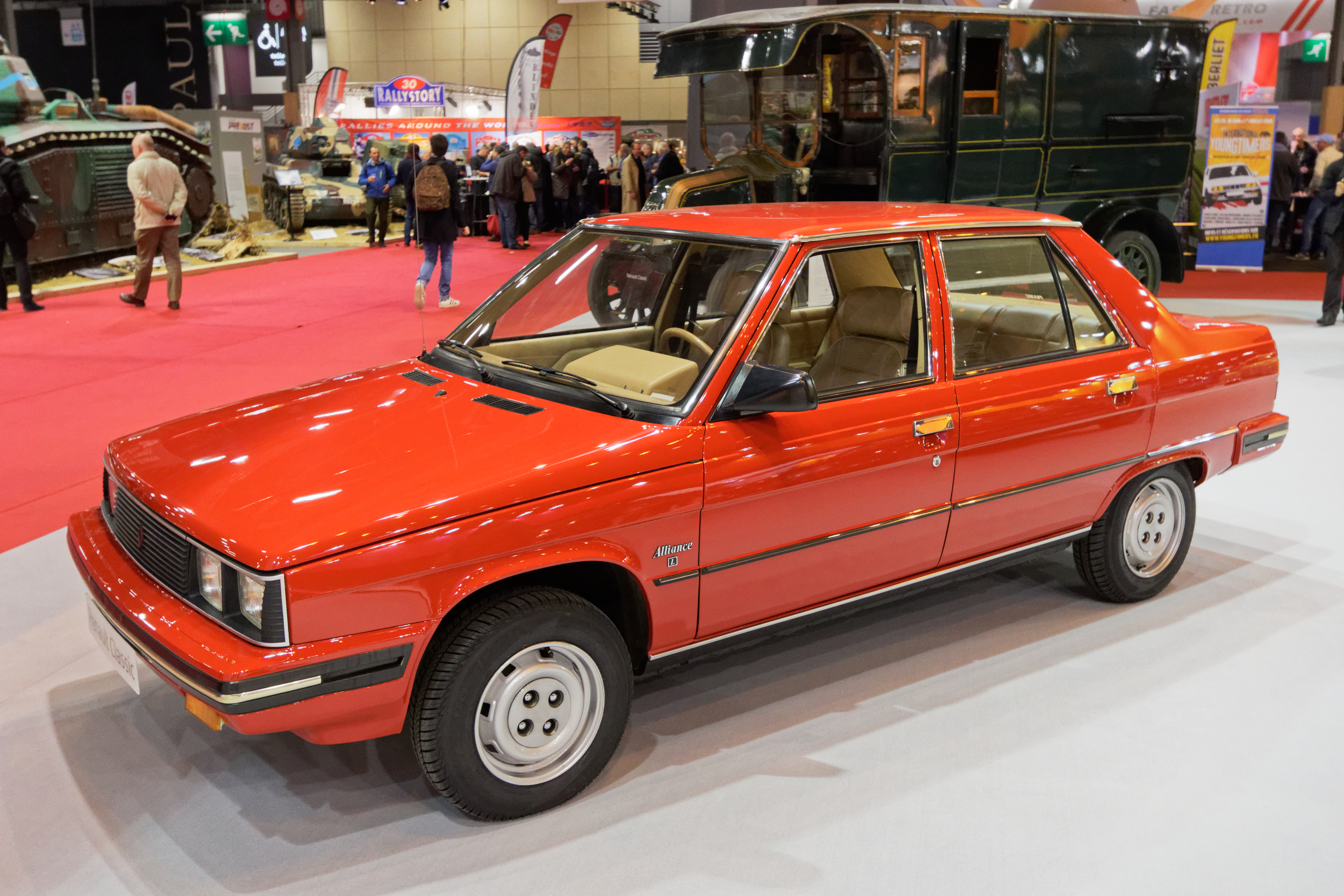
AMC Alliance, 1983 Motor Trend Car of the Year

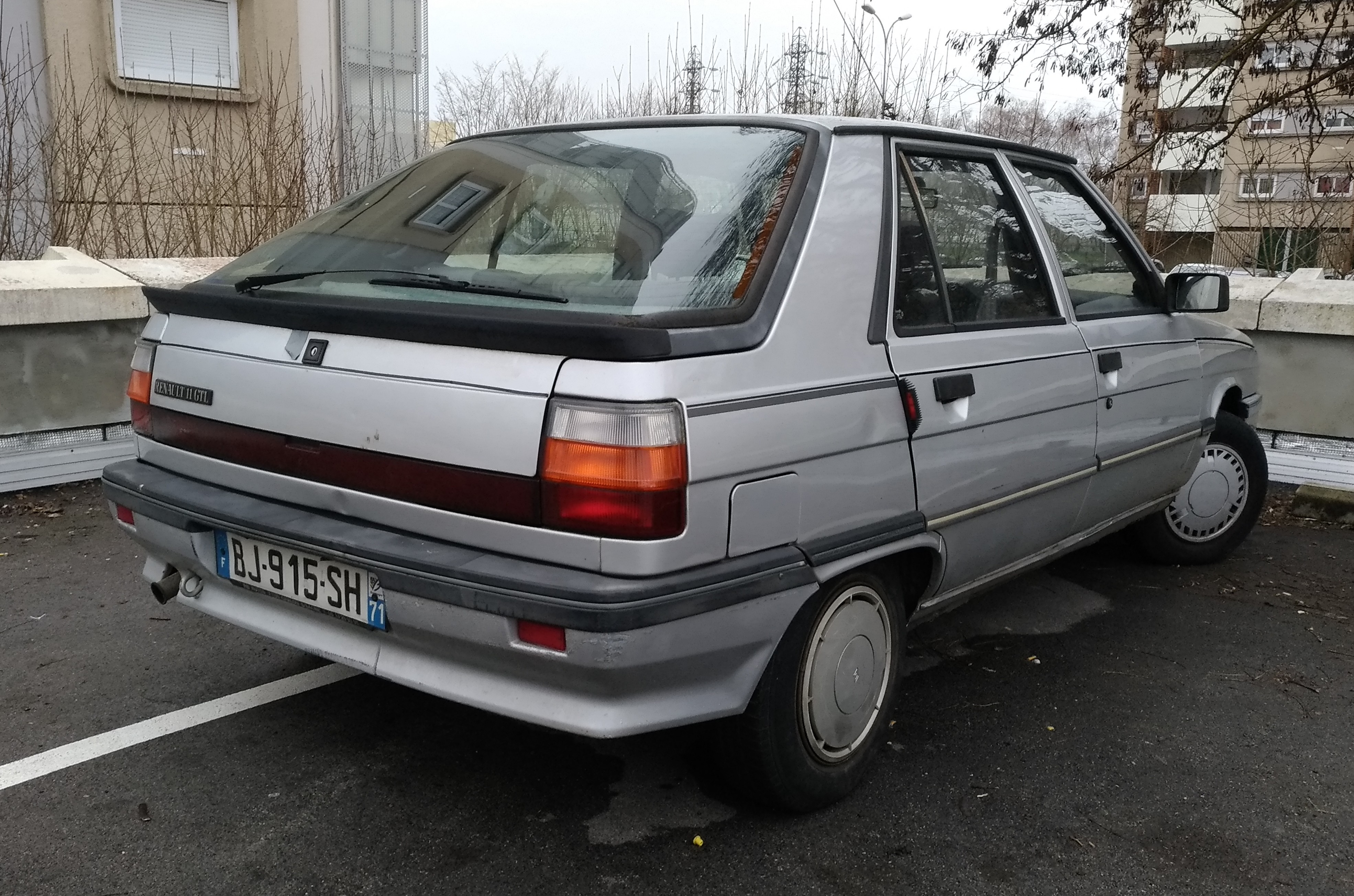
Renault 11 (1983)

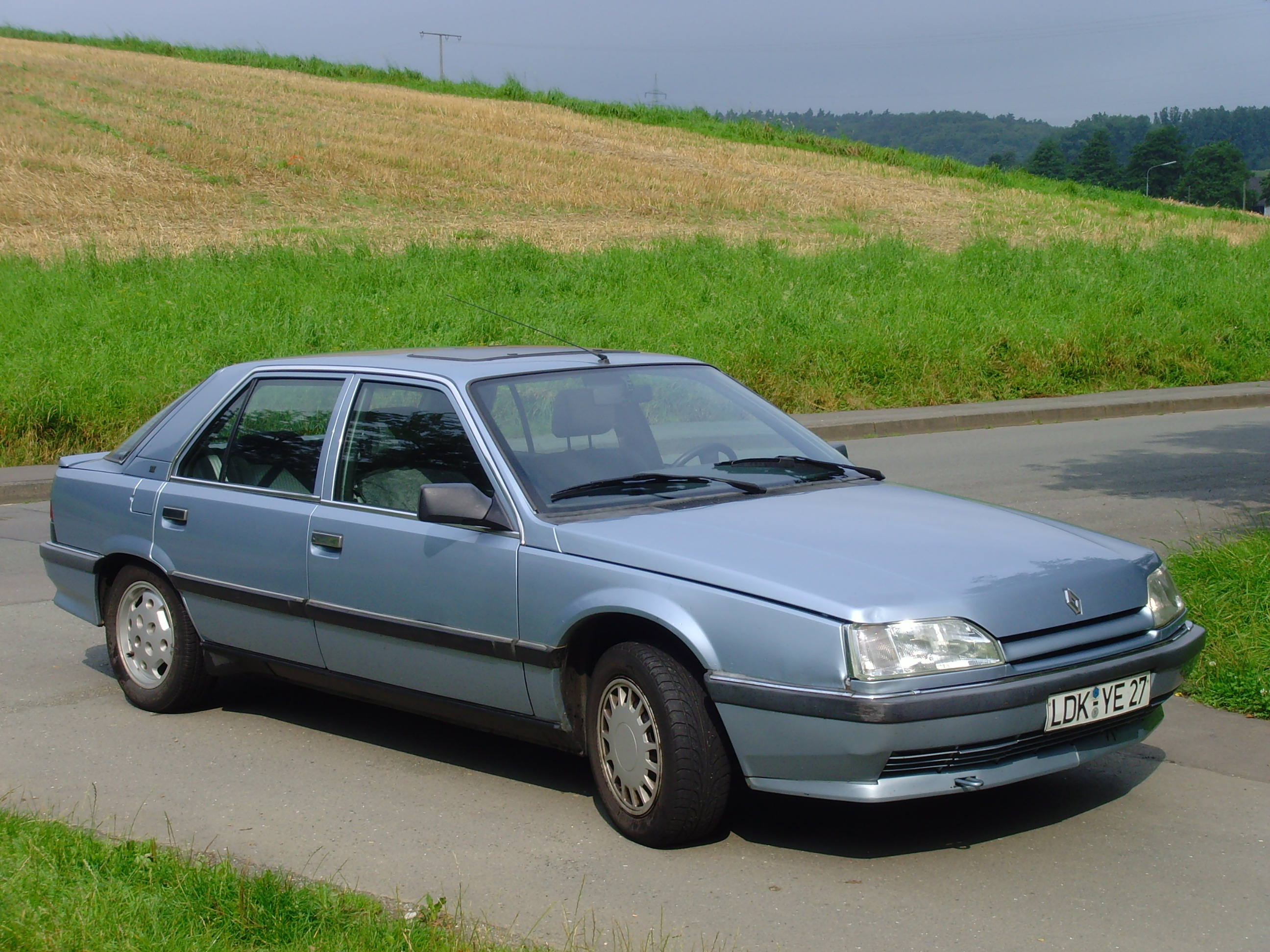
Renault 25 (1984)

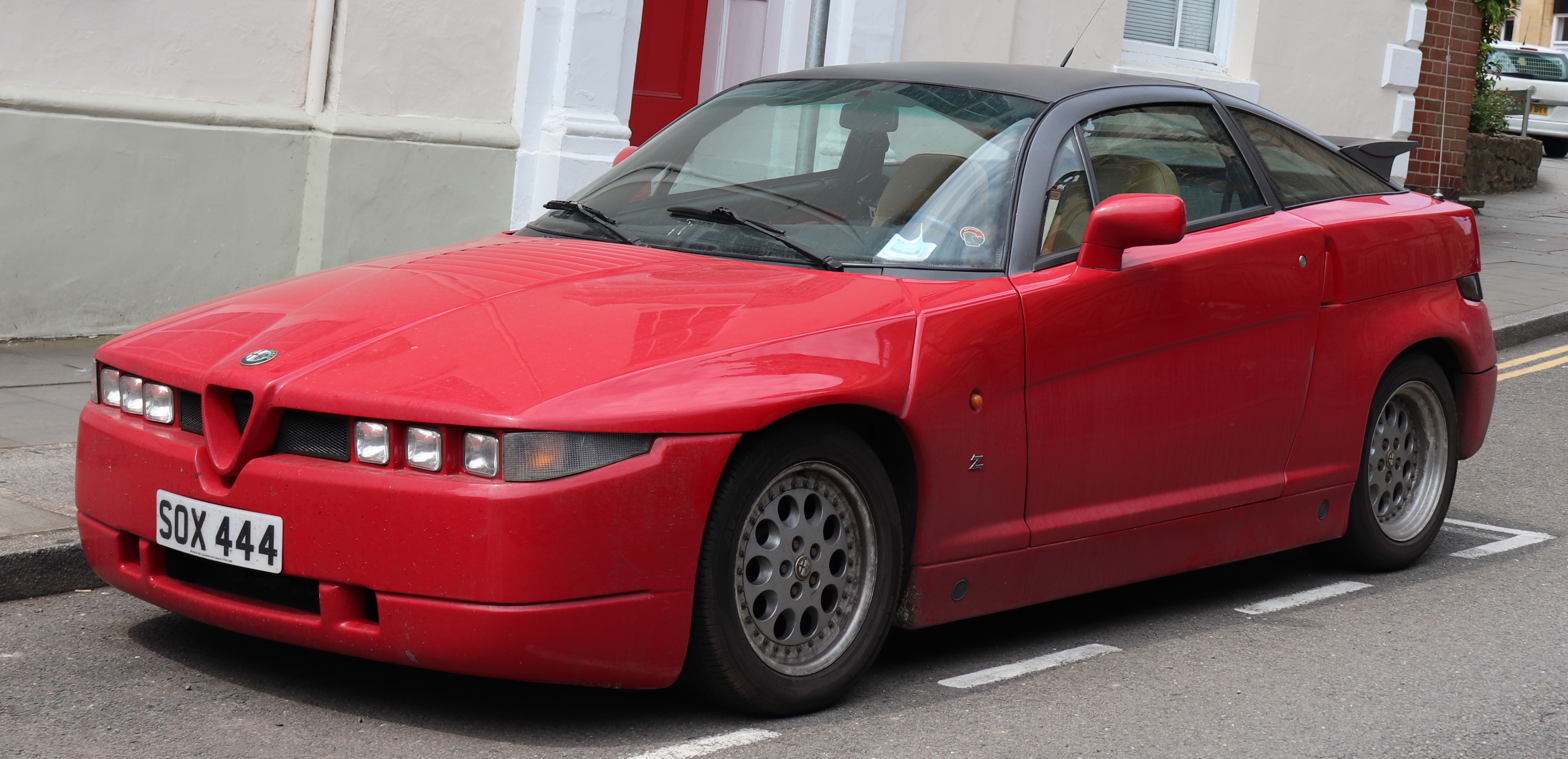
Alfa Romeo SZ (1989)
