= Gaston Juchet =

French engineer

- Born: 1 September 1930
- Died: 12 November 2007 (aged 77)
- Education: Engineering
- Alma mater: École Centrale Paris
- Known for: Chief Designer of Renault
- Successor: Robert Opron (1975); Patrick le Quément (1987)

Gaston Juchet (French pronunciation: [ɡɑstɔ̃ ʒyʃɛ]) was a French engineer, known for being the chief designer of Renault between 1963 and 1975 and again between 1984 and 1987.

== Early life and career ==
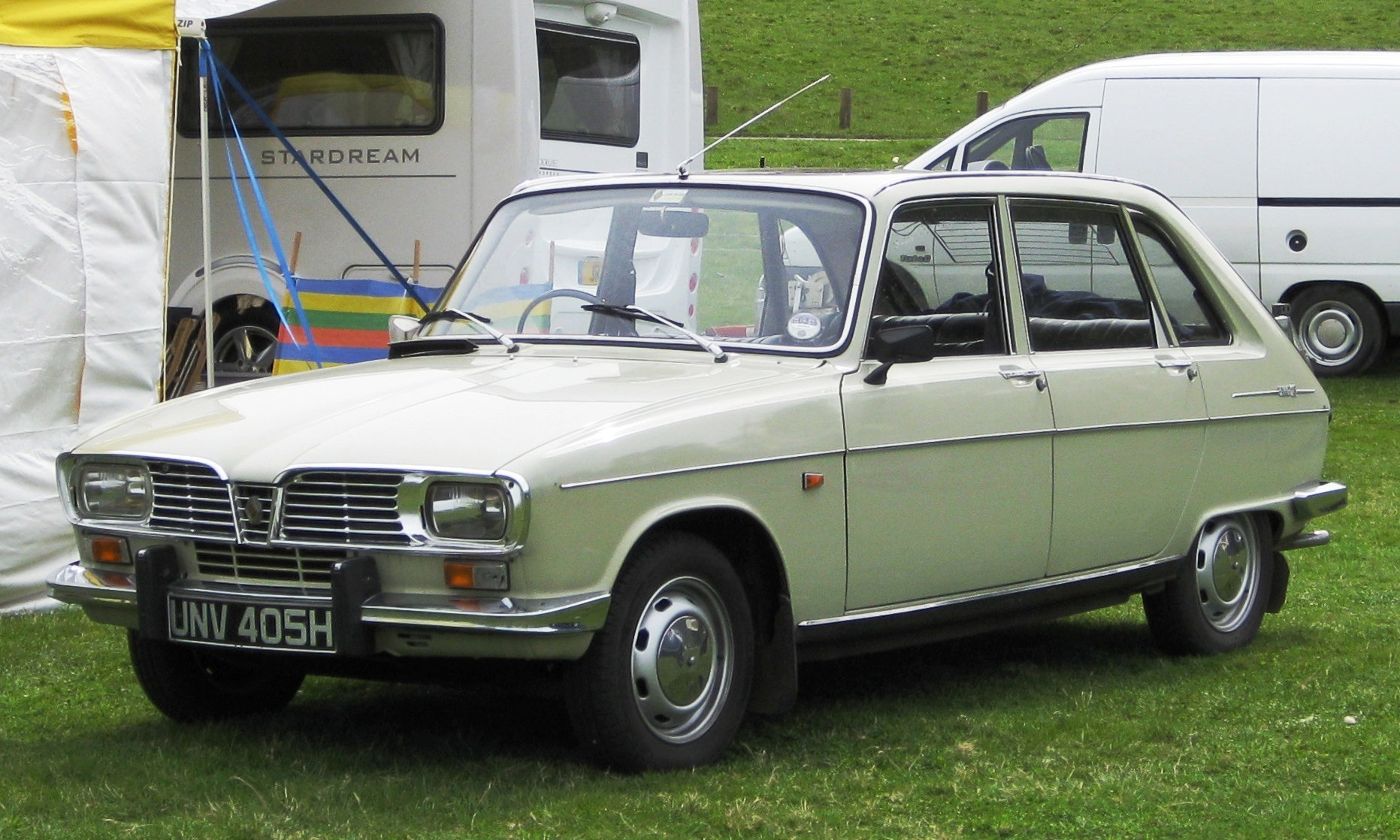
The Renault 16

Gaston Juchet's interest in drawing begun when he was a boarder at the Lycée Louis-le-Grand in Paris. He graduated with engineering degrees from the École Centrale Paris. In 1958, after his military service, he joined Renault's research and development department as an aerodynamics engineer. His first work within the company was a facelifting for the Frégate. Later, he was the key developer of the project 115, which would become the Renault 16. From 1963 onwards, he was one of the most important designers within Renault. In 1965, he was officially appointed chief of Renault Styling. During the following years, he participated in the design of various Renault cars such as the Renaults 12, 15, 17, 5 (although the 5 was mostly designed by Michel Boué), 6, 30, 20 and the Alpine A310. In 1975, Robert Opron took the direction of Renault Styling, and Juchet was made one of his assistants along with Jacques Nocher. When Opron left the company in 1984, Juchet became again chief designer until he was replaced by Patrick le Quément in 1987.

Juchet introduced modern methods of prototyping (UNISURF) and Computer Aided Design (CAD) in the Renault design and favoured synergies with Italian experts such as Marcello Gandini, Giorgetto Giugiaro and Sergio Coggiola and with the chief designer of American Motors (then a company associated with Renault), Dick Teague.

== Awards ==
Juchet won the French Grand Prix of Industrial Design in 1976.
