= Peugeot 505 =

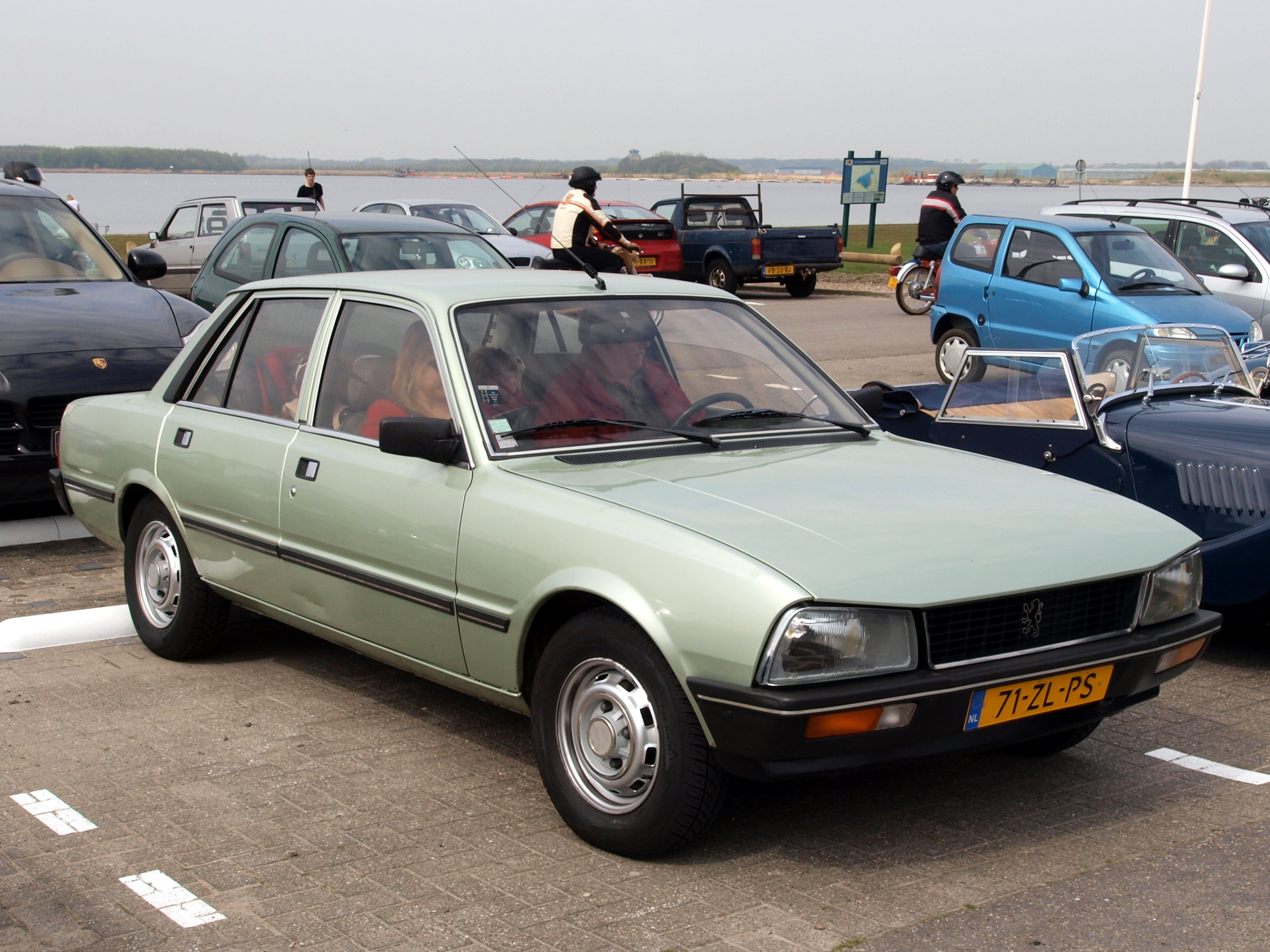

Overview
- Manufacturer: Peugeot
- Also called: Guangzhou-Peugeot GP 7202 (China)
- Production: 1979–1992 (Europe); 1981–1987 (Indonesia); 1981–1991 (Taiwan); 1981–1995 (Argentina); 1990–1997 (China)
- Assembly: France: Sochaux (Sochaux Plant); Argentina: Villa Bosch (Sevel); Australia: Heidelberg, Victoria (Renault Australia); Australia: Enfield (Leyland); Chile: Los Andes (Automotores Franco Chilena S.A.); China: Guangzhou (GPAC); Egypt: Cairo (AAV); Indonesia: Jakarta (Gaya Motor); Malaysia: Johor Bahru (OASB); Morocco: Casablanca (Sopriam); Nigeria: Kaduna (PAN); Portugal: Setúbal (Movauto); Spain: Vigo (Vigo Plant); Taiwan: Changhua (Yǔtián); Thailand: Bangkok (Yontrakit Group); Uruguay: Montevideo (Nordex S.A.)
- Designer: Pininfarina and Peugeot

Body and chassis
- Class: Large family car (D)
- Body style: 4-door saloon 5-door estate
- Layout: FR layout

Powertrain
- Engine: petrol: 1796 cc XM7A I4; 1971 cc XN1/XN6 I4; 1995 cc ZEJ "Douvrin" I4; 2155 cc N9T "Simca 180" turbo I4; 2165 cc ZDJ "Douvrin" I4; 2849 cc ZN3J "PRV" V6; diesel: 2304 cc XD2 I4 (NA/turbo); 2498 cc XD3 I4 (NA/turbo)
- Transmission: 3-speed automatic ZF 3HP22; 4-speed automatic ZF 4HP22; 4-speed manual BA 7/4; 5-speed manual BA 7/5; 5-speed manual BA 10/5

Dimensions
- Wheelbase: 2,743 mm (108.0 in) (sedan); 2,900 mm (114.2 in) (wagon)
- Length: 4,579 mm (180.3 in) (sedan); 4,898 mm (192.8 in) (wagon)
- Width: 1,737 mm (68.4 in) (sedan); 1,730 mm (68.1 in) (wagon)
- Height: 1,424–1,446 mm (56.1–56.9 in) (sedan); 1,540 mm (60.6 in) (wagon)
- Curb weight: 1,210–1,410 kg (2,668–3,109 lb)

Chronology
- Predecessor: Peugeot 504
- Successor: Peugeot 405

The Peugeot 505 is a large family car produced by the French manufacturer Peugeot from 1979 to 1992 in Sochaux, France. It was also manufactured in various other countries including Argentina (by Sevel from 1981 to 1995), China, Thailand, Indonesia and Nigeria. The 505 was Peugeot's last rear-wheel drive car.

According to the manufacturer, 1,351,254 505s were produced between 1978 and 1992 with 1,116,868 of these being saloons/sedans.

== History ==
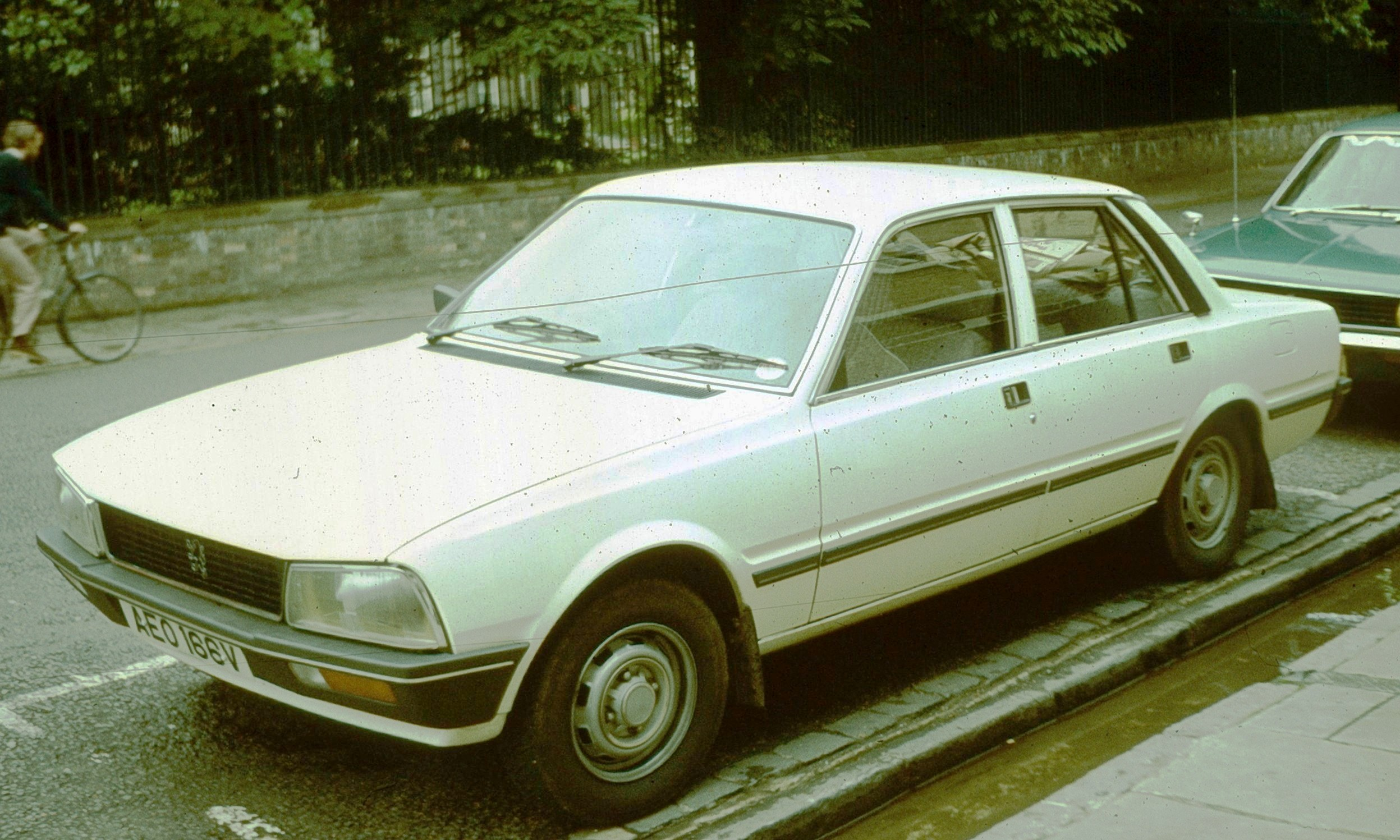
An early 1980 Peugeot 505, photographed in 1981

Officially unveiled on 16 May 1979, the 505 was the replacement for the 504 with which it shared many of its underpinnings. It was originally available as a sedan/saloon; a station wagon/estate, including an eight-passenger Familiale version, were introduced at the 1982 Geneva Motor Show. The styling, a collaboration between Pininfarina and Peugeot's internal styling department, is very similar to that of the smaller 305. The original interior was designed by Paul Bracq, generally more well known for his work for Mercedes-Benz and BMW. It is known as the "Work Horse" of Africa today. The front-engine, rear-wheel-drive layout differentiated the 505 from many of its marketplace competitors.

After initially being produced only in left-hand drive for its first few months, the 505 was available in right-hand drive for RHD markets from October 1979. Its best selling competitor in the UK was the Ford Granada.

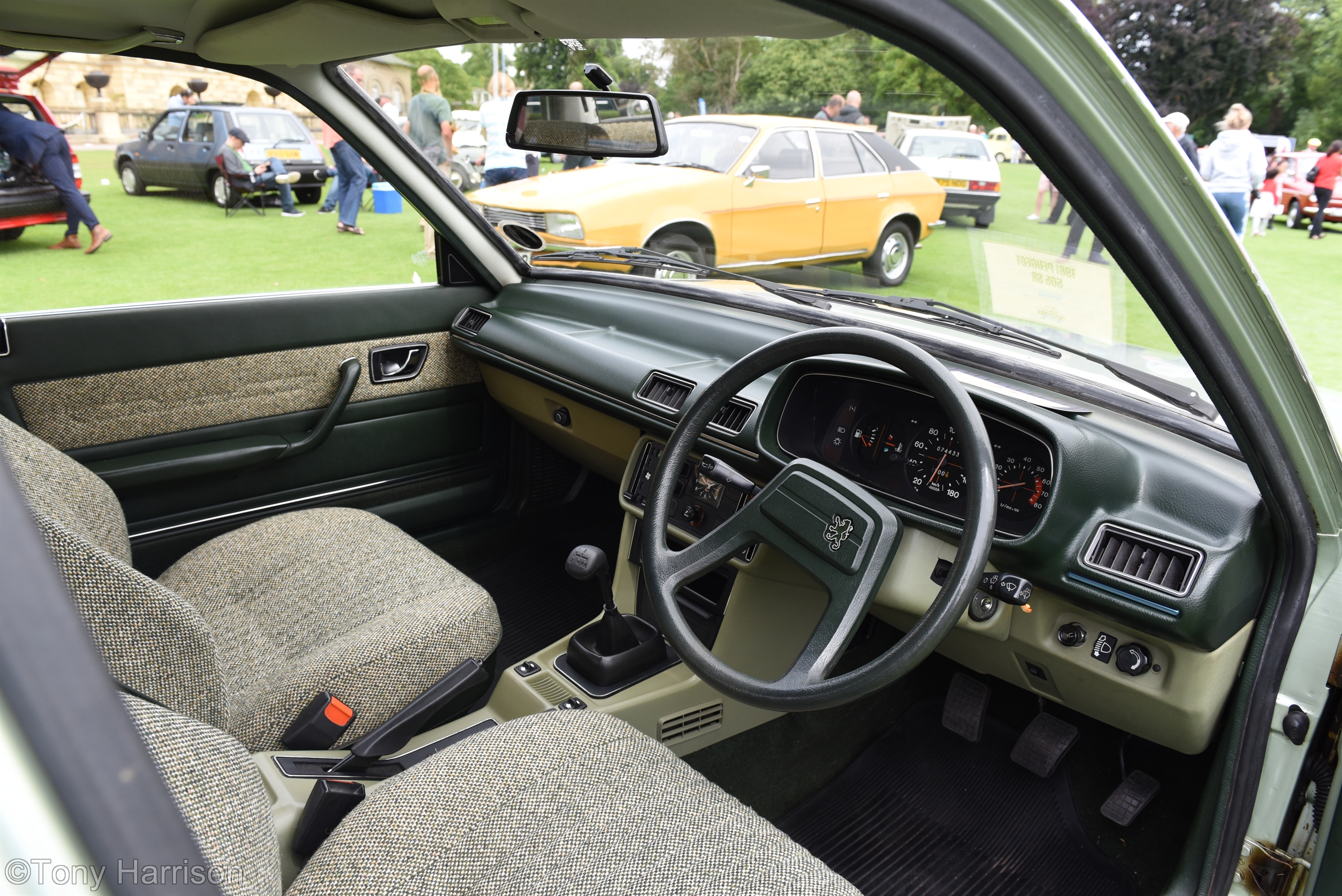
Peugeot 505 interior

The 505 was praised by contemporary journalists for its ride and handling, especially on rough and unmade roads; perhaps one reason for its popularity in less developed countries. The 505 also had good ground clearance; if that wasn't enough though, Dangel offered a taller four-wheel drive version of the 505 Break/Familiale equipped with either the intercooled turbodiesel 81 kW (110 hp) engine or the 2.2-litre petrol, 96 kW (130 hp) engine. The four-wheel drive 505s converted by Dangel also have shorter gear ratios. Initially higher-end petrol models used a fuel-injected alloy engine while lower-end models used a carburettor, with a diesel also sold.

The estate model was launched in 1982, and was available with seven seats, just like the Peugeot 504 estate. Also new in 1982 was the fully equipped 505 STI, equipped with the all-new 2165 cc four-cylinder Douvrin engine developed together with Renault. In October 1982, the 505 Turbo Injection was introduced. This used a 2.2-liter version of the Simca Type 180 engine, developed by Chrysler Europe, as this block was stronger than the Douvrin engine used in the STI. The initial model developed 110 kW (150 hp); thanks to the introduction of an intercooler this increased to 118 kW (160 hp) in early 1984. In 1985 a dealer-installed Kit PTS de 200ch, developed by famous Peugeot tuners Danielson, became available. A further upgrade at the time of the 1986 facelift increased power to 132 kW (180 hp) thanks to a slight increase in boost, at which time ABS brakes were also added to the 505 Turbo.

=== Facelift ===
The range was given a facelift in 1986, including an all new interior, but European Peugeot 505 production began to wind down following the launch of the smaller Peugeot 405 in 1987. A V6 model, using the 2.8-liter PRV unit, was added during 1986 - priced identically to the 505 Turbo, it targeted a different clientele, trying to fill the gap left by the 604.

Saloon production came to a halt in 1989, when Peugeot launched its new flagship 605 saloon, while the estate remained in production until 1992 - although plans for an estate version of the 605 never materialised. The 605 was in production for a decade but never matched the popularity of the 505. In some countries such as France and Germany, the 505 estate was used as an ambulance, a funeral car, police car, military vehicle and as a road maintenance vehicle. There were prototypes of 505 coupés and 505 trucks, but they never entered production.

The 505 was one of the last Peugeot models to be sold in the United States, with sedan sales ending there in 1990 and wagon sales in 1991. The last sedans sold had PRV's 2.8 V6 engine only. Unique to the US were turbocharged station wagons, both with petrol and diesel engines. 505s were also assembled and sold in Australia. First introduced in October 1980, they were initially assembled by Renault Australia. In March 1981 Leyland Australia took over and kept assembling the 505 until the end of 1983. During 1983, Leyland Australia became Jaguar Rover Australia (JRA) and the new company kept selling Peugeots. From 1984 on, 505s sold in Australia were imported fully built up from France. The 505 was also built in Argentina, Chile, China, and New Zealand. In New York City, Peugeot 505 diesels were briefly used as taxicabs.

In Thailand, the Peugeot 505 sold well. It was available as a CKD version assembled in Bangkok, due to the restrictions on importing completely built-up cars.

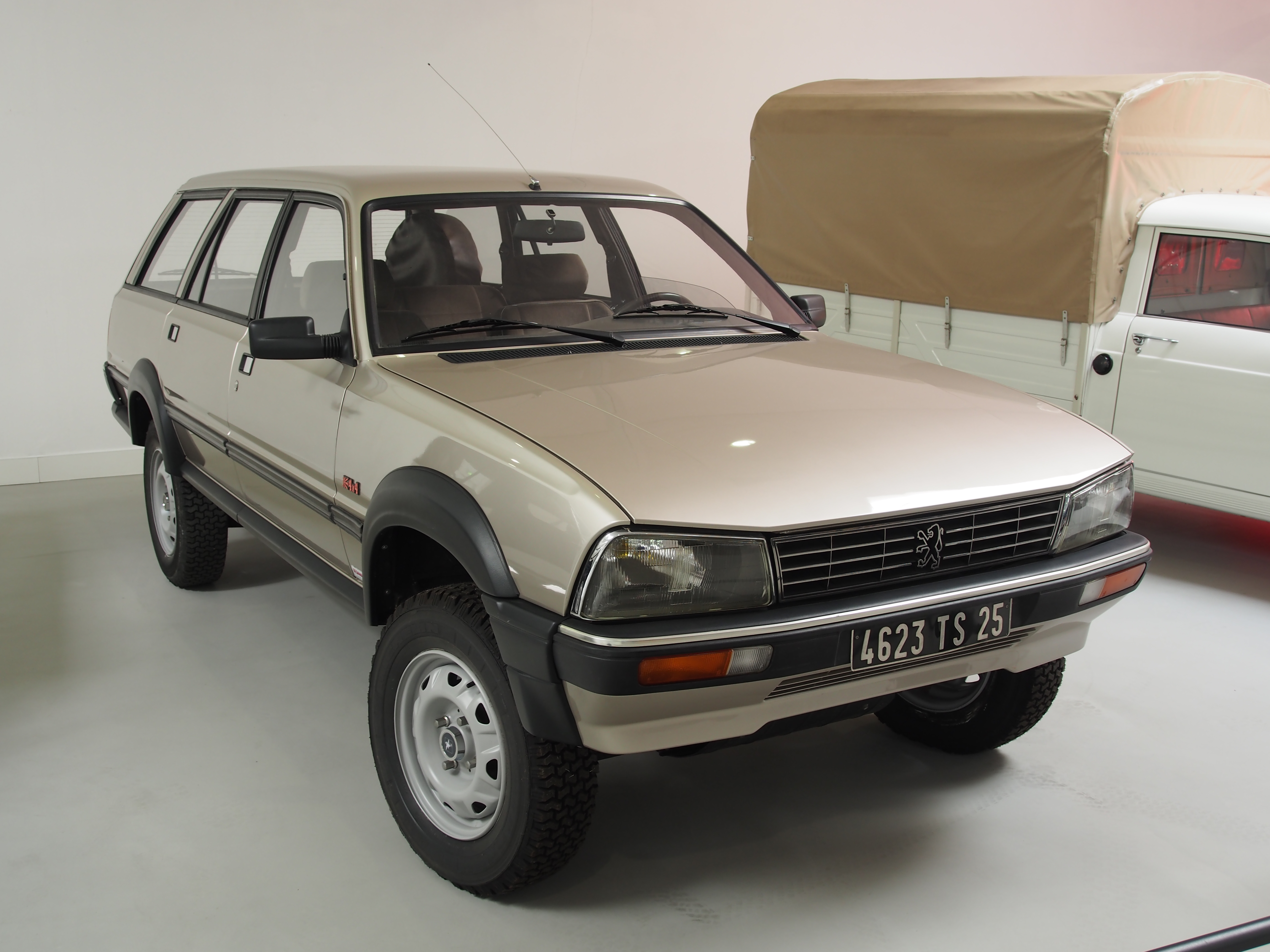
Peugeot 505 Break 4x4 Dangel (France)

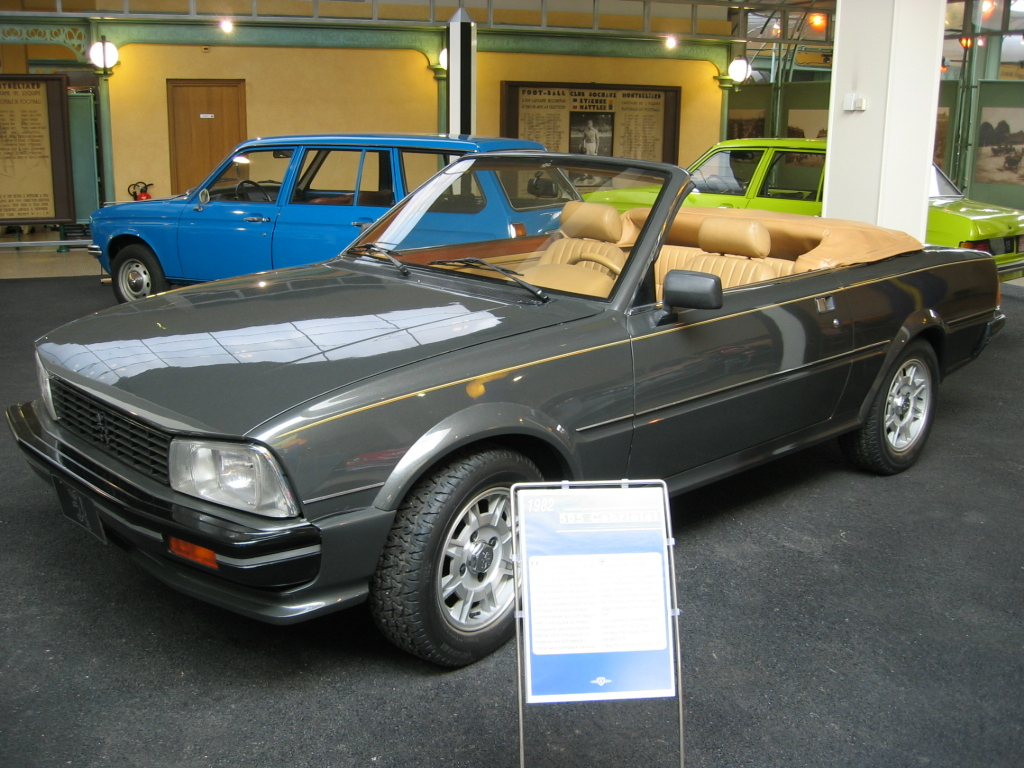
Prototype Peugeot 505 cabriolet

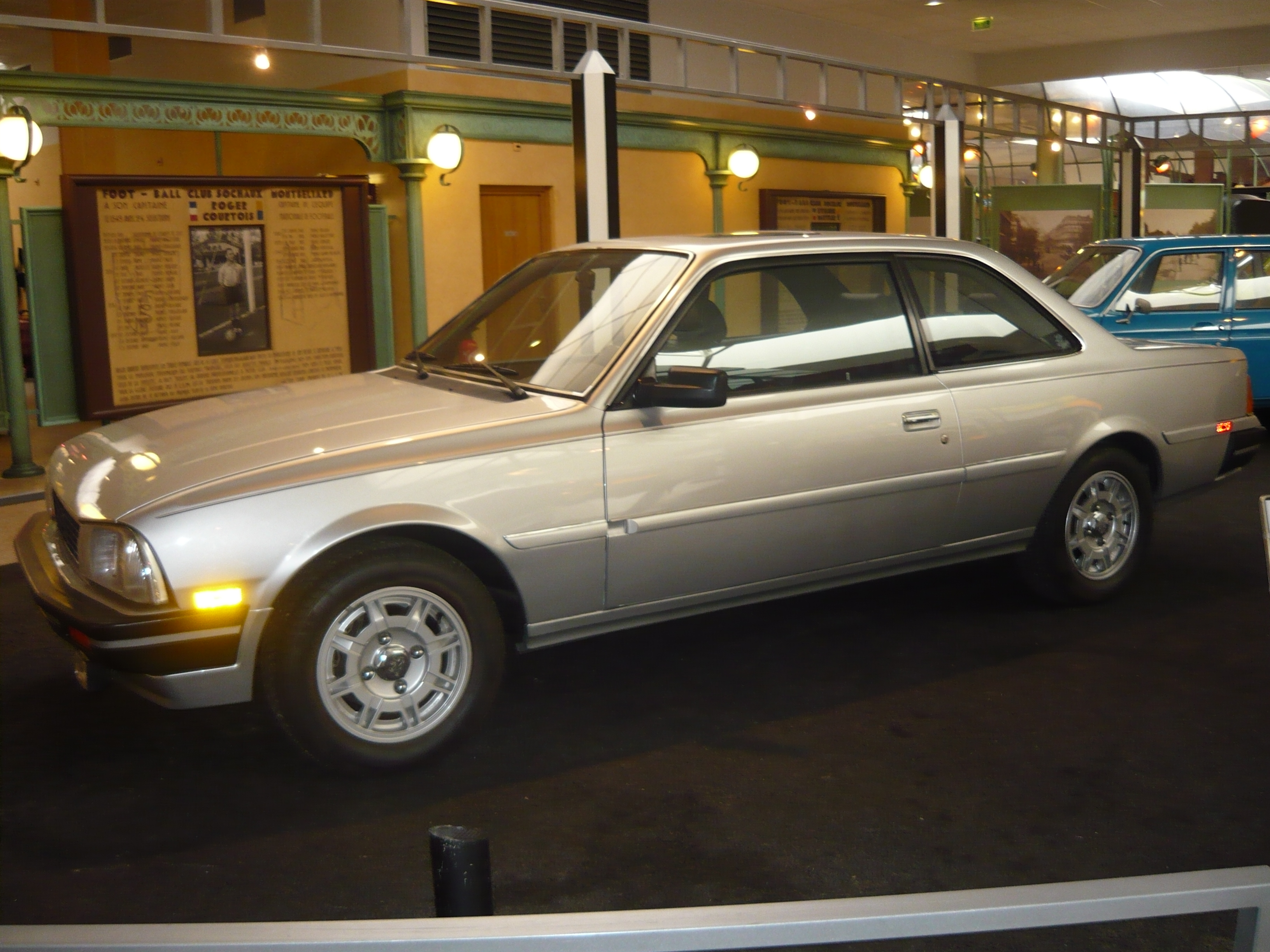
Prototype Peugeot 505 coupé

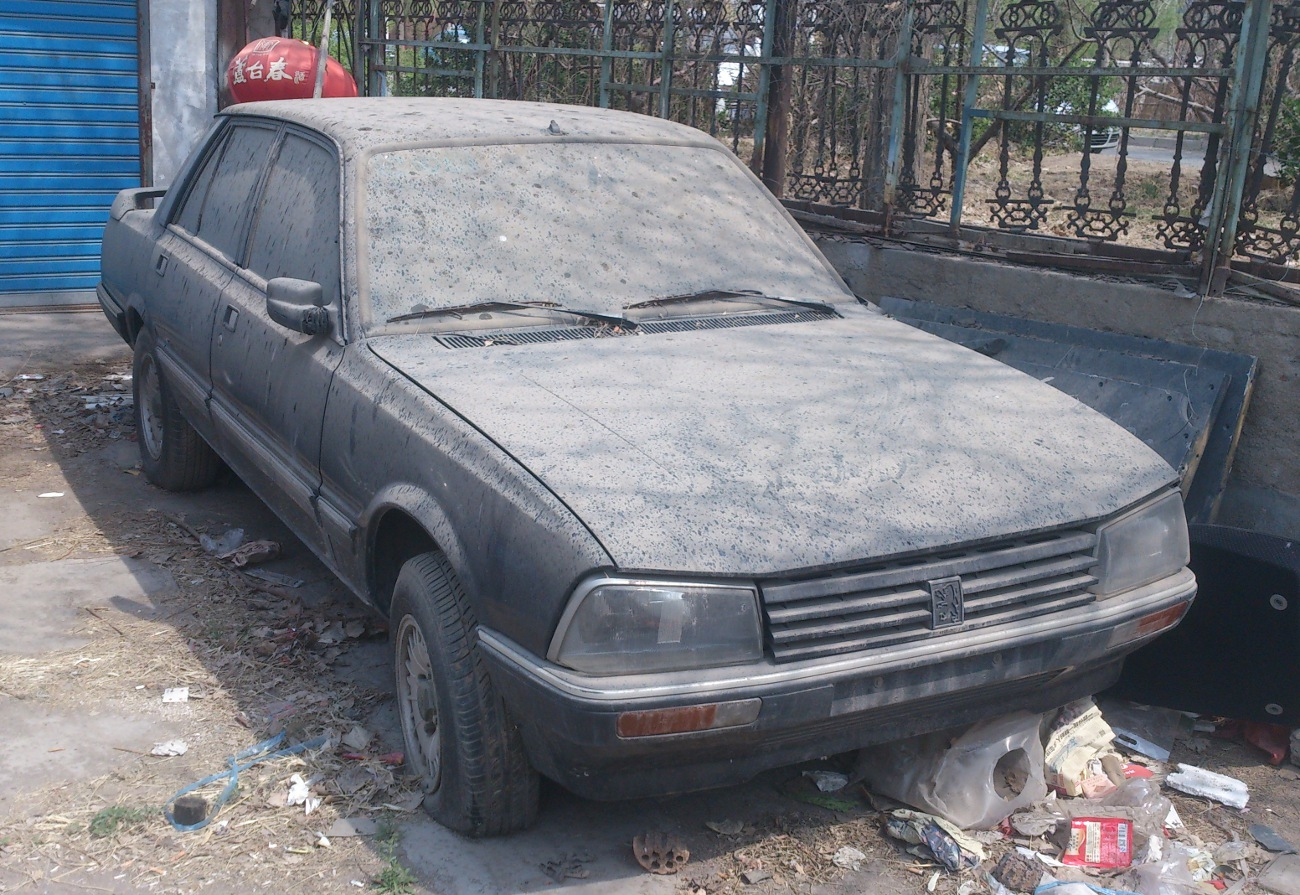
Guangzhou-Peugeot 505 SX2 (China, abandoned)

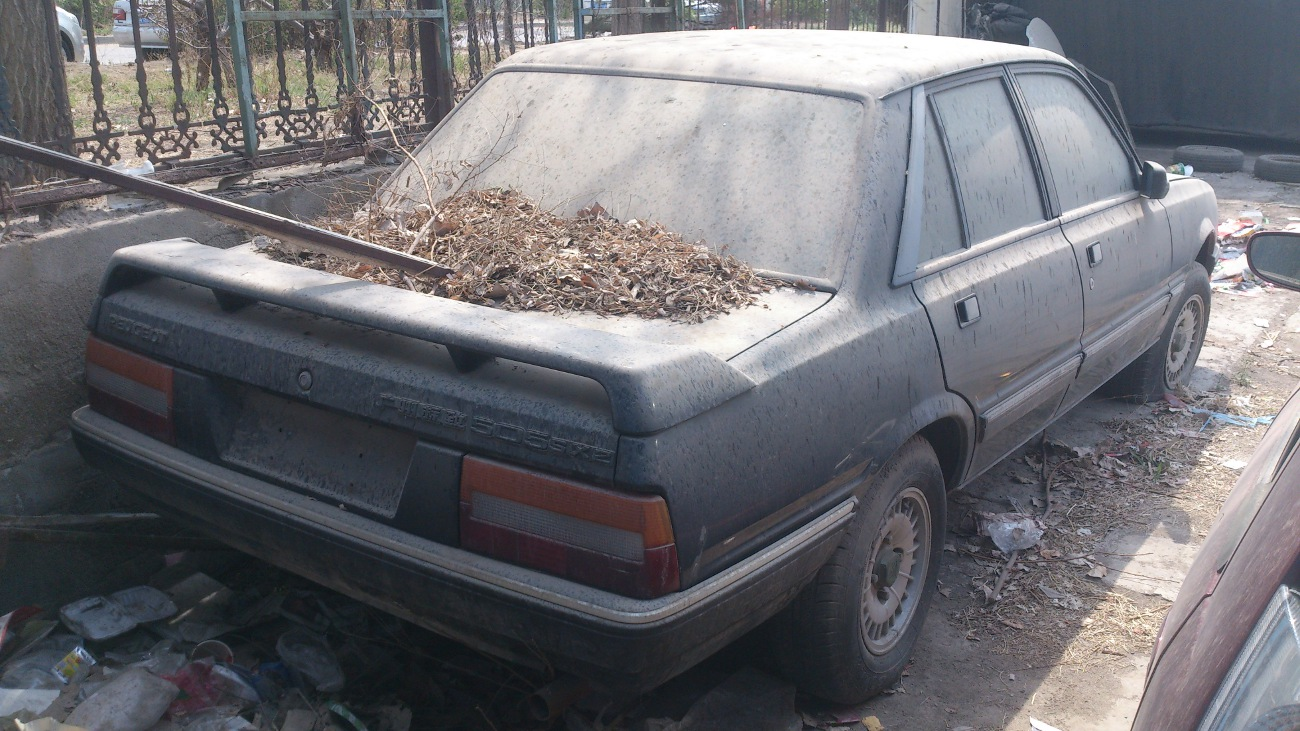
Guangzhou-Peugeot 505 SX2; rear view

== Mechanical characteristics ==
The 505 had rear-wheel drive and the engine at the front, mounted longitudinally. The suspension system included MacPherson struts and coil springs at front and semi-trailing arms with coil springs at rear, with a body-mounted rear differential and four constant-velocity joints. Station wagons (and most sedans built in Argentina) had instead a live-axle rear suspension, with Panhard rod and coil springs. Stabilizer bars were universal at front but model-dependent at rear. The car used disc brakes at the front, and either disc or drum brakes at the rear, depending on the model. The steering was a rack and pinion system, which was power assisted on most models.

== Break/Familiale ==
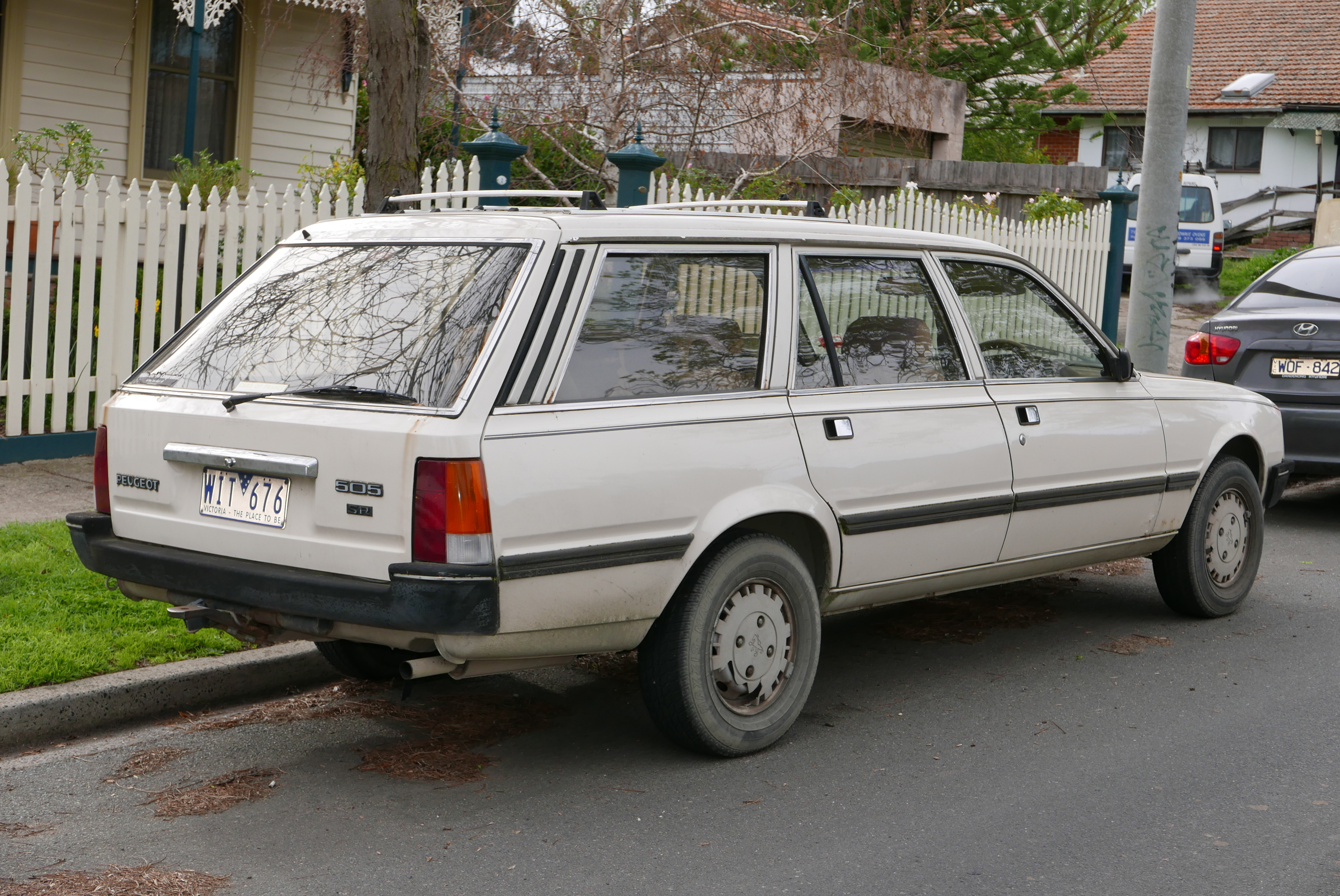
1984 Peugeot 505 SR wagon (Australia)

Introduced in the spring of 1982, the Break (Estate) and Familiale versions were quite different from saloons. The wheelbase was also longer, to help make it one of the most spacious in the market, at 2,900 mm (114.2 in). This was, not coincidentally, the same exact wheelbase as had been used on the 504 estate derivatives.

The Familiale (family estate), with its third row of bench seats (giving a total of eight forward-facing seats), was popular with larger families and as a taxi. The two rows of rear seats could be folded to give a completely flat load area, with 1.94 cubic metres of load capacity. The total load carrying capacity is 590 kg (1,301 lb). When released, it was hailed as a luxury touring wagon. The Familiale was marketed as the "SW8" in the United States, for "station wagon, eight seats."

In France, Dangel produced a modified offroad version of the Peugeot 505 Break with high suspension and four-wheel drive.

== Engines ==
A range of diesel and petrol engines were offered. The first diesels (XD2) arrived in July 1979, two months after the petrol versions. The turbocharged petrol unit was first seen in October 1982.

505s were mainly equipped with inline-four-cylinder engines, although there was a short run of petrol V6's built after 604 production had come to an end.

Petrol
Engine layout	Model	Fuel system	Power (DIN)	Torque	Compression ratio	Top Speed km/h (mph)	Notes
1796 cc OHV I4	XM7	Manual choke, single-barrel carburetor	80 CV (59 kW; 79 hp) at 5500 rpm	14.5 kg⋅m (142 N⋅m; 105 lb⋅ft) at 2500 rpm	8.8:1	156 km/h (97 mph)	
1796 cc OHV I4	XM7A	Manual choke, twin-barrel carburetor	90 CV (66 kW; 89 hp) at 5000 rpm	15 kg⋅m (147 N⋅m; 108 lb⋅ft) at 2750 rpm	8.8:1	165 km/h (103 mph)	
1971 cc OHV I4	XN1	Manual choke, single-barrel carburetor	82 CV (60 kW; 81 hp) at 5000 rpm	16 kg⋅m (158 N⋅m; 117 lb⋅ft) at 2500 rpm	8.8:1	152 km/h (94 mph)	1982–1987 Break GL only
1971 cc OHV I4	XN1A	Automatic choke, twin-barrel carburetor	96 CV (71 kW; 95 hp) at 5200 rpm later 100 CV (74 kW; 99 hp) at 5000 rpm	16.4 kg⋅m (161 N⋅m; 119 lb⋅ft) at 3000 rpm	8.8:1	166 km/h (103 mph)	More powerful version introduced in 1984
1971 cc OHV I4	XN1A	Automatic choke, twin-barrel carburetor	108 CV (79 kW; 107 hp) at 5250 rpm	17.2 kg⋅m (169 N⋅m; 124 lb⋅ft) at 3000 rpm	8.8:1	175 km/h (109 mph)	
1971 cc OHV I4	XN6	Bosch K-Jetronic fuel injection	113 CV (83 kW; 111 hp) at 5000 rpm	17.5 kg⋅m (172 N⋅m; 127 lb⋅ft) at 2750 rpm	8.8:1	176 km/h (109 mph)	SR Injection, only produced in Argentina for the local market
1971 cc OHV I4	XN6	Bosch K-Jetronic fuel injection with catalytic converter	98 CV (72 kW; 97 hp) at 5000 rpm	116 lb⋅ft (157 N⋅m; 16 kg⋅m) at 3500 rpm	8.35:1		Reserved for the North American market and other countries that required catalytic converter.
1995 cc OHC I4	ZEJK 829B	Bosch K-Jetronic fuel injection	110 CV (81 kW; 108 hp) at 5250 rpm	17.4 kg⋅m (171 N⋅m; 126 lb⋅ft) at 4000 rpm	9.2:1		"Douvrin Engine"
2165 cc OHC I4	ZDJK	Bosch K-Jetronic fuel injection	117 CV (86 kW; 115 hp) at 5750 rpm	19.0 kg⋅m (186 N⋅m; 137 lb⋅ft) at 3500 rpm	9.2:1	178 km/h (111 mph)	This was a longer stroke version of the ZEJK
2165 cc OHC I4	ZDJL 851B	Bosch LE2-Jetronic fuel injection	130 CV (96 kW; 128 hp) at 5500 rpm	19.2 kg⋅m (188 N⋅m; 139 lb⋅ft) at 4250 rpm	9.8:1	185 km/h (115 mph)	Acceleration from 0 to 100 km/h: 10.0 s
2165 cc OHC I4	ZDJL 851Y	Bosch LE2-Jetronic fuel injection	130 CV (96 kW; 128 hp) at 5750 rpm	19.2 kg⋅m (188 N⋅m; 139 lb⋅ft) at 4250 rpm	9.8:1		Practically the same as ZDJL 851B, but with little changes to meet other countries legislation requirements.
2165 cc OHC I4	ZDJL 851X	Bosch LU2-Jetronic fuel injection with catalytic converter	122 CV (90 kW; 120 hp) at 5000 rpm or 115 CV (85 kW; 113 hp) at 5000 rpm	18.1 kg⋅m (178 N⋅m; 131 lb⋅ft) at 3500 rpm or 17.5 kg⋅m (172 N⋅m; 127 lb⋅ft) at 3500 rpm	8.8:1	178 km/h (111 mph)	
2155 cc OHC I4	N9T	Garrett Turbocharger, Bosch L-Jetronic	150 CV (110 kW; 148 hp) at 5200 rpm	24 kg⋅m (235 N⋅m; 174 lb⋅ft) at 3000 rpm	7.5:1	200 km/h (124 mph)	Also known as the "Simca Type 180" engine. Acceleration from 0 to 100 km/h: 8.8 seconds.
2155 cc OHC I4	N9TE	Intercooler, Garrett turbocharger, Bosch L-Jetronic	160 CV (118 kW; 158 hp) at 5200 rpm	25 kg⋅m (245 N⋅m; 181 lb⋅ft) at 3000 rpm	8:1	205 km/h (127 mph)	
2155 cc OHC I4	N9TEA	Intercooler, turbocharger, Bosch L-Jetronic	180 CV (132 kW; 178 hp) at 5200 rpm	28 kg⋅m (275 N⋅m; 203 lb⋅ft) at 3000 rpm	8:1	210 km/h (130 mph)	Equipped with an electronic boost controller; acceleration from 0 to 100 km/h: 8.4 seconds.
2849 cc OHC V6	ZN3J 154F	Bosch LH-Jetronic fuel injection	170 CV (125 kW; 168 hp) at 5600 rpm	24 kg⋅m (235 N⋅m; 174 lb⋅ft) at 4250 rpm	10:1	205 km/h (127 mph)	Acceleration from 0 to 100 km/h: 9.2 s
2849 cc OHC V6	ZN3J 154X	Bosch LH-Jetronic fuel injection with catalytic converter	147 CV (108 kW; 145 hp) at 5000 rpm	23.9 kg⋅m (234 N⋅m; 173 lb⋅ft) at 3750 rpm	9.5:1		

Diesel
Engine layout	Model	Fuel system	Power	Torque	Compression ratio	Top Speed km/h (mph)	Notes
2304 cc OHV I4	XD2	pre-chamber IDI	70 CV (51 kW; 69 hp) at 4500 rpm	13.4 kg⋅m (131 N⋅m; 97 lb⋅ft) at 2000 rpm	22.2:1	141 km/h (88 mph)	From the Peugeot 504, was used on early models, and was also supplied by Peugeot to Ford for the Sierra and Granada
2304 cc OHV I4	XD2C	pre-chamber IDI	70 CV (51 kW; 69 hp)				
2304 cc OHV I4	XD2S	Garret turbocharger, IDI	80 CV (59 kW; 79 hp) at 4150 rpm	18.8 kg⋅m (184 N⋅m; 136 lb⋅ft) at 2000 rpm	21:1	160 km/h (99 mph)	
2498 cc OHV I4	XD3	pre-chamber IDI	76 CV (56 kW; 75 hp) at 4500 rpm	15.3 kg⋅m (150 N⋅m; 111 lb⋅ft) at 2000 rpm	23:1	150 km/h (93 mph)	
2498 cc OHV I4	XD3T	Garret turbocharger, IDI	95 CV (70 kW; 94 hp) at 4150 rpm	21 kg⋅m (206 N⋅m; 152 lb⋅ft) at 2000 rpm	21:1	170 km/h (106 mph)	Used on 1985 and newer models
2498 cc OHV I4	XD3TE	Intercooler, turbocharger IDI	110 CV (81 kW; 108 hp)	24 kg⋅m (235 N⋅m; 174 lb⋅ft) at 2000 rpm	21:1	178 km/h (111 mph)	GTDT

== Trim levels ==
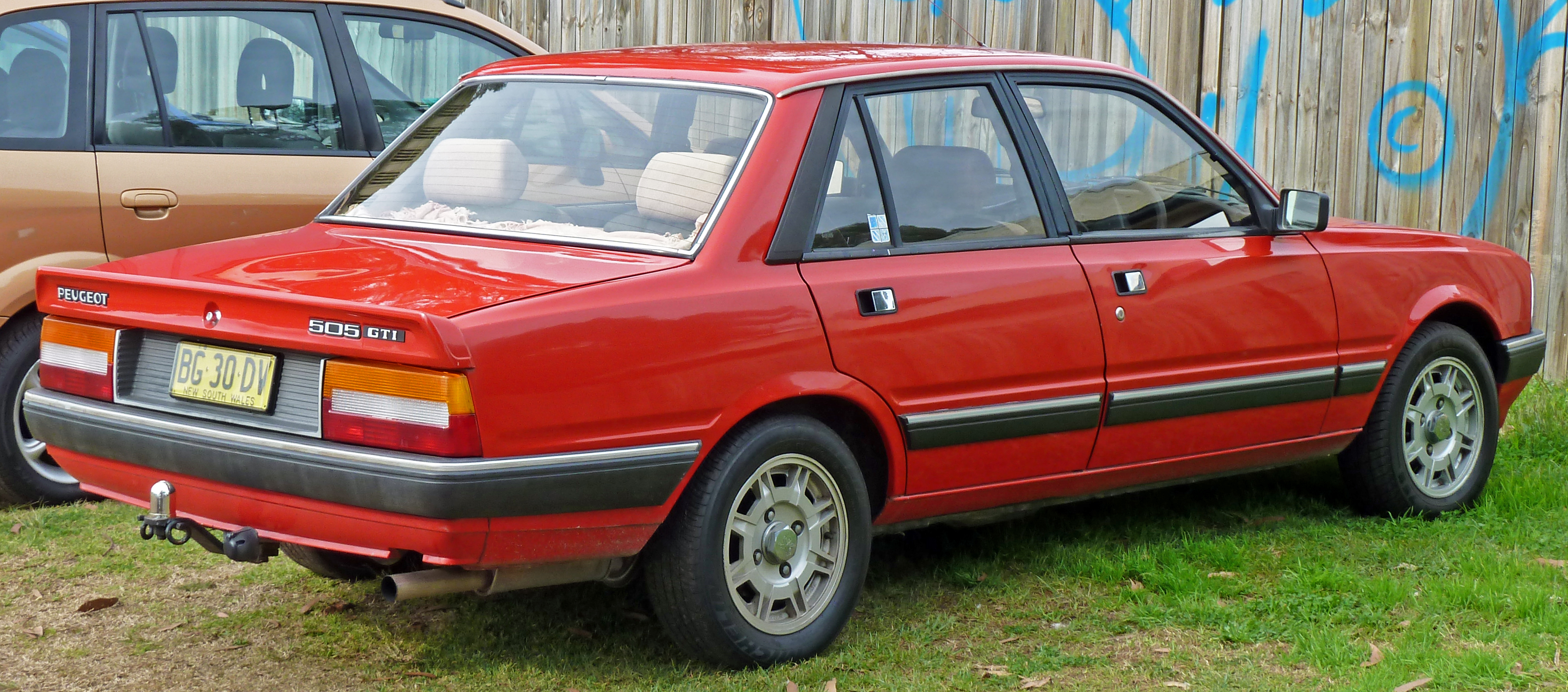
1985 Peugeot 505 GTi sedan (Australia)

Peugeot 505 models varied very much in equipment. Base SRD cars with the 2,304 cc diesel engine didn't even have power steering, but the GTD Turbo, the GTI, the V6, and the TI all had power steering, central locking doors, air conditioning, a five-speed manual transmission, sunroof (except the GTD Turbo), and front fog lights. In the V6, the power steering was speed-sensitive, the central locking doors came with an infrared remote, and the heating and ventilation systems included electronic climate control. A three-speed automatic transmission was available on early 505s, which was later replaced by a four-speed unit. The most durable 505 model proved to be the GTD with a five-speed manual transmission. In Australia, the 505 was sold as a GR, SR, STi, or GTi sedan, or an SR or GTi eight-seater station wagon, all with petrol engines. Very few GRD and SRD diesel-engined 505s were sold in Australia. The Series II update saw the SR replaced with an SLi.

=== North America ===
The United States and Canada had their own 505 body, which arrived for 1980 and was first introduced on the French Caribbean island of Martinique. Notable differences were: gas tank moved inwards (now behind rear bench), with filling neck on rightside, different style quad headlamps, taillights (pre-1986 sedans), distinctive whip antenna moved from roof to rear fender (and changed to telescopic), larger bumpers, tailpipe moved from right to left. Fewer engines were offered, all detuned to meet more restrictive emission standards. The models sold in North America were: Base, "GL", "S", "GLS", "STI", "DL", "Liberté", "STX", "Turbo", "GLX", "SW8", "V6", "Turbo S". Originally, only the 96 hp (72 kW) 2.0-liter four was offered, alongside the 2.3-liter diesel with 71 hp (53 kW). Both were carryovers from the 504, although the gasoline unit had gained eight horsepower thanks to the introduction of fuel injection.

Diesel sales were strong in the aftermath of the energy crisis, with diesels reaching a peak level representing 85 percent (14,430 diesels) of the company's US sales in 1981 (their best year in the US). Both the XD2S and larger XD3T were available in the US for model years 1985 and 1986, with the smaller engine being fitted to station wagons. By 1986, after the Oldsmobile diesel debacle and many years of stable fuel prices, only the turbodiesel remained and diesel sales were down to a share of just over 10 percent (1,545 out of 14,439). New for 1987 was the limited edition Liberté model (so named in honor of the centennial celebration of the Statue of Liberty). The well equipped Liberté was priced considerably higher than the 2.2-litre GL, close to the GLS model, but received the much less powerful 2-liter petrol "four" producing 97 hp (72 kW) in the sedan and 95 hp (71 kW) in the wagon. Diesel engines were no longer available in the US after 1987.

All North-American bound 505's were built in Peugeot's Sochaux Plant, in France. In December 1980, as a late introduction for the 1981 model year, a 2.3-liter turbodiesel model with 80 hp (60 kW) arrived. Unlike the naturally aspirated model, the turbodiesel received a five-speed manual as standard fitment. The turbodiesel was very successful as it had no direct competitors in the United States market and represented nearly half of all Peugeot sales during the first model year. In the late spring of 1984, the 1985 505 Turbo arrived. The engine was similar to the one seen in Europe, albeit initially without an intercooler. Max power for 1985 was 142 hp (106 kW). This eventually climbed to 180 hp (134 kW) for later model years. The Turbo estate version was unique to the North American markets.

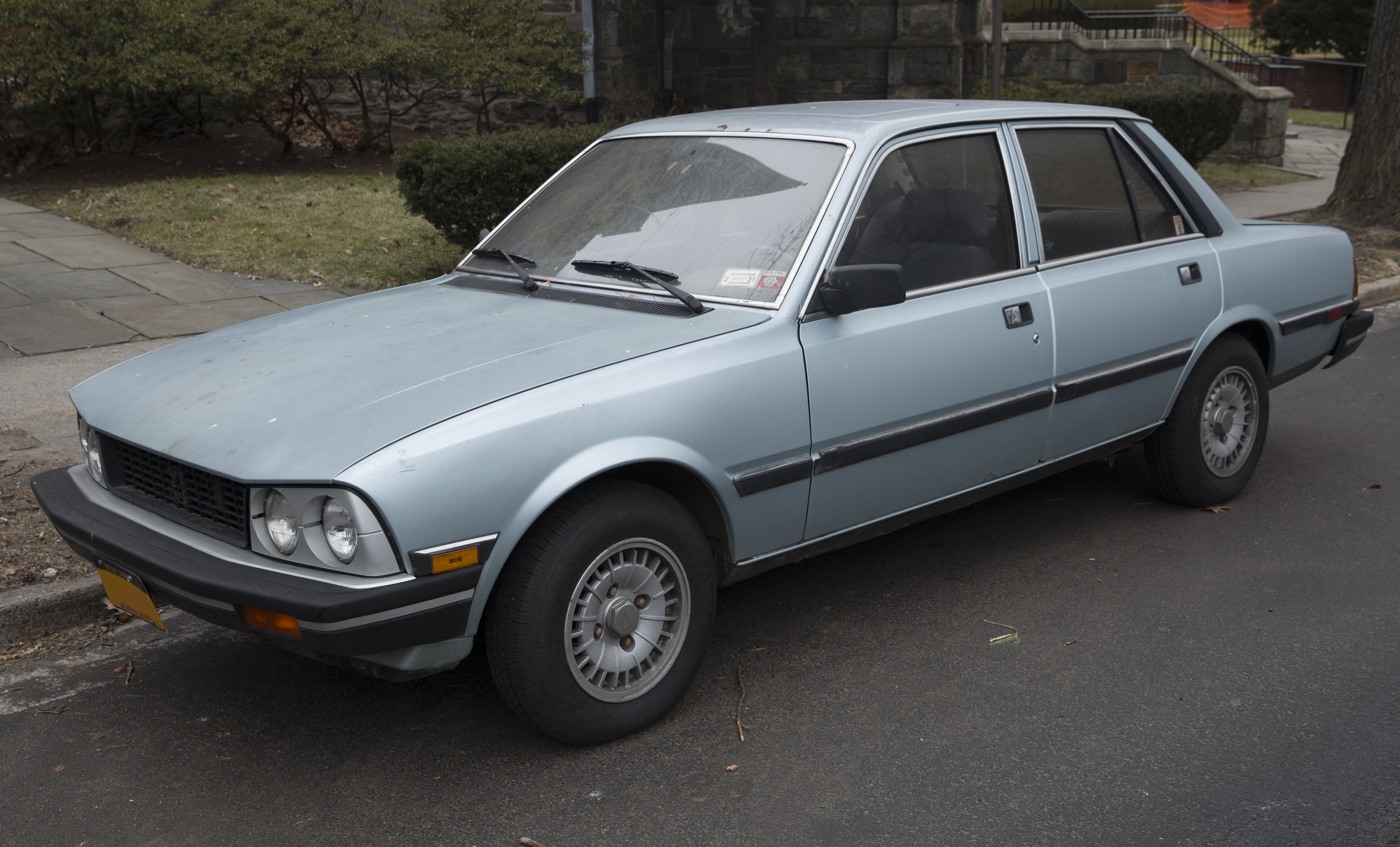
Early model Peugeot 505 Diesel with round headlamps (USA)

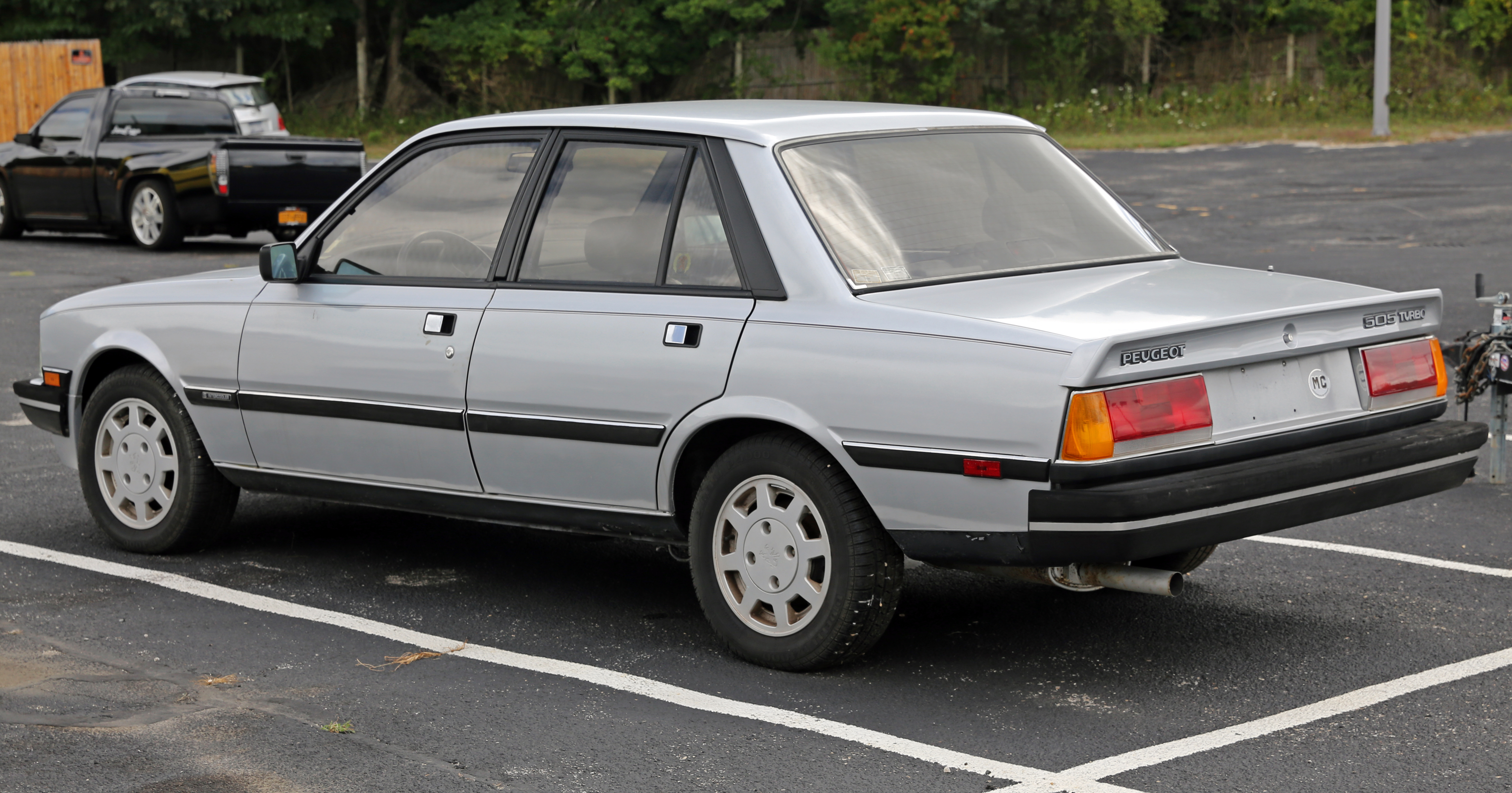
1987 Peugeot 505 Turbo S, showing North America-specific taillights and exhaust on the left (USA)

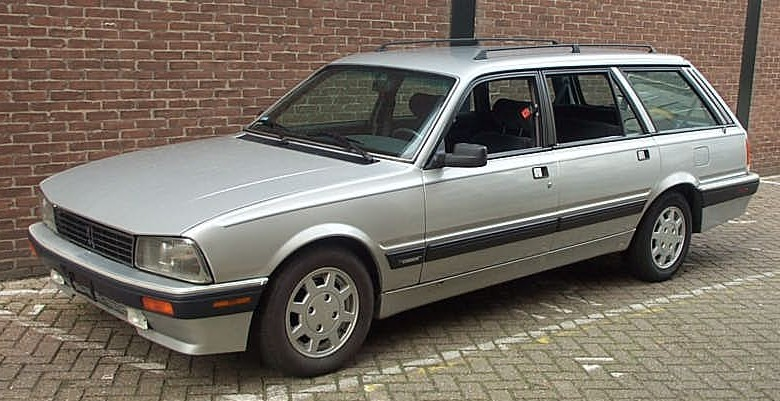
1991 Peugeot 505 Turbo SW8 - the eight-seater version of the Turbo wagon, never sold outside of North America

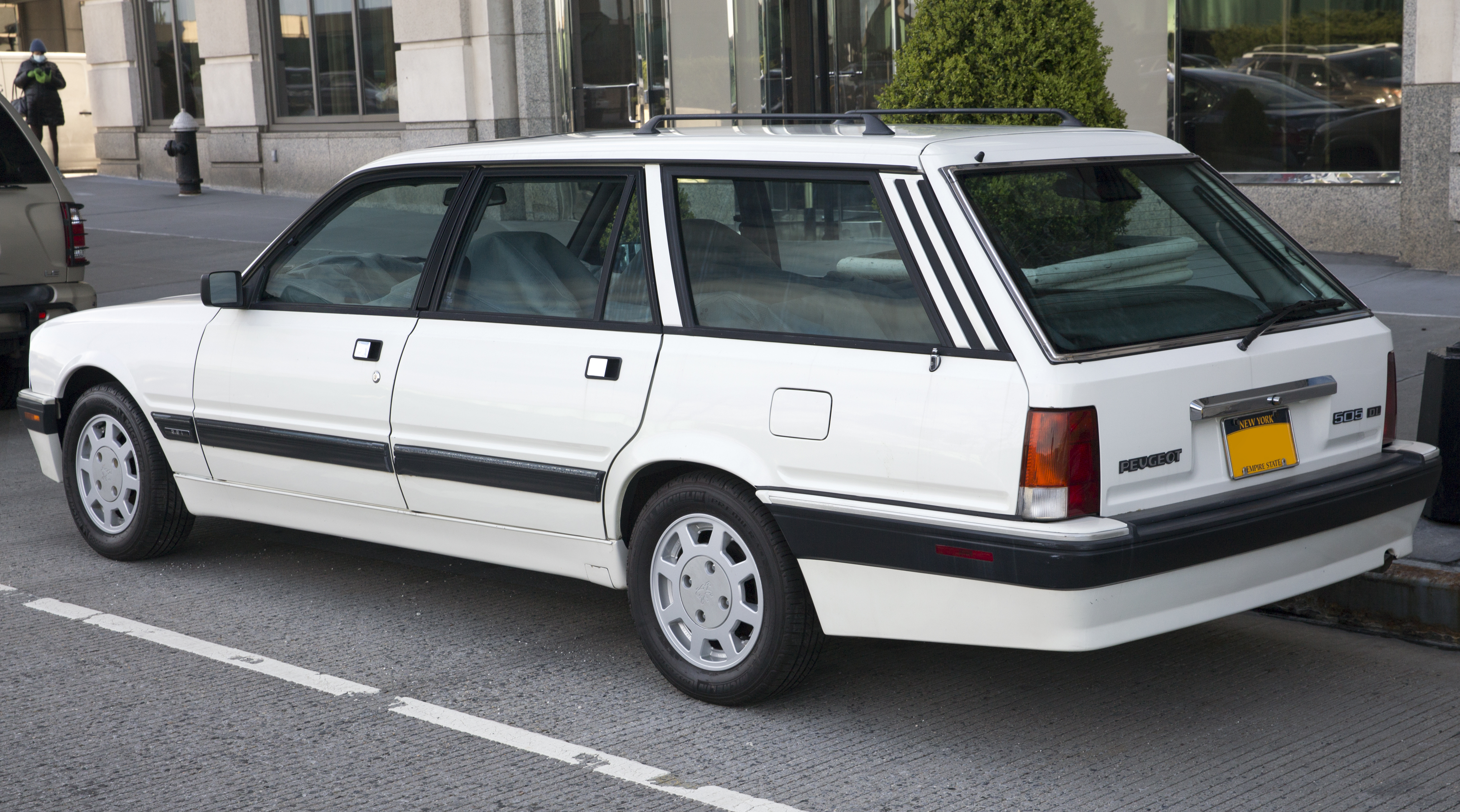
1992 Peugeot 505 DL Station Wagon - late US-market models received large, deep-skirted bumpers

== Notes and references ==
- Flammang, James M. (1994). Standard Catalog of Imported Cars, 1946-1990. Iola, WI: Krause Publications, Inc. ISBN 0-87341-158-7.
