= Douvrin engine =

ZDJ/ZEJ engine (Peugeot) J-Type engine (Renault)
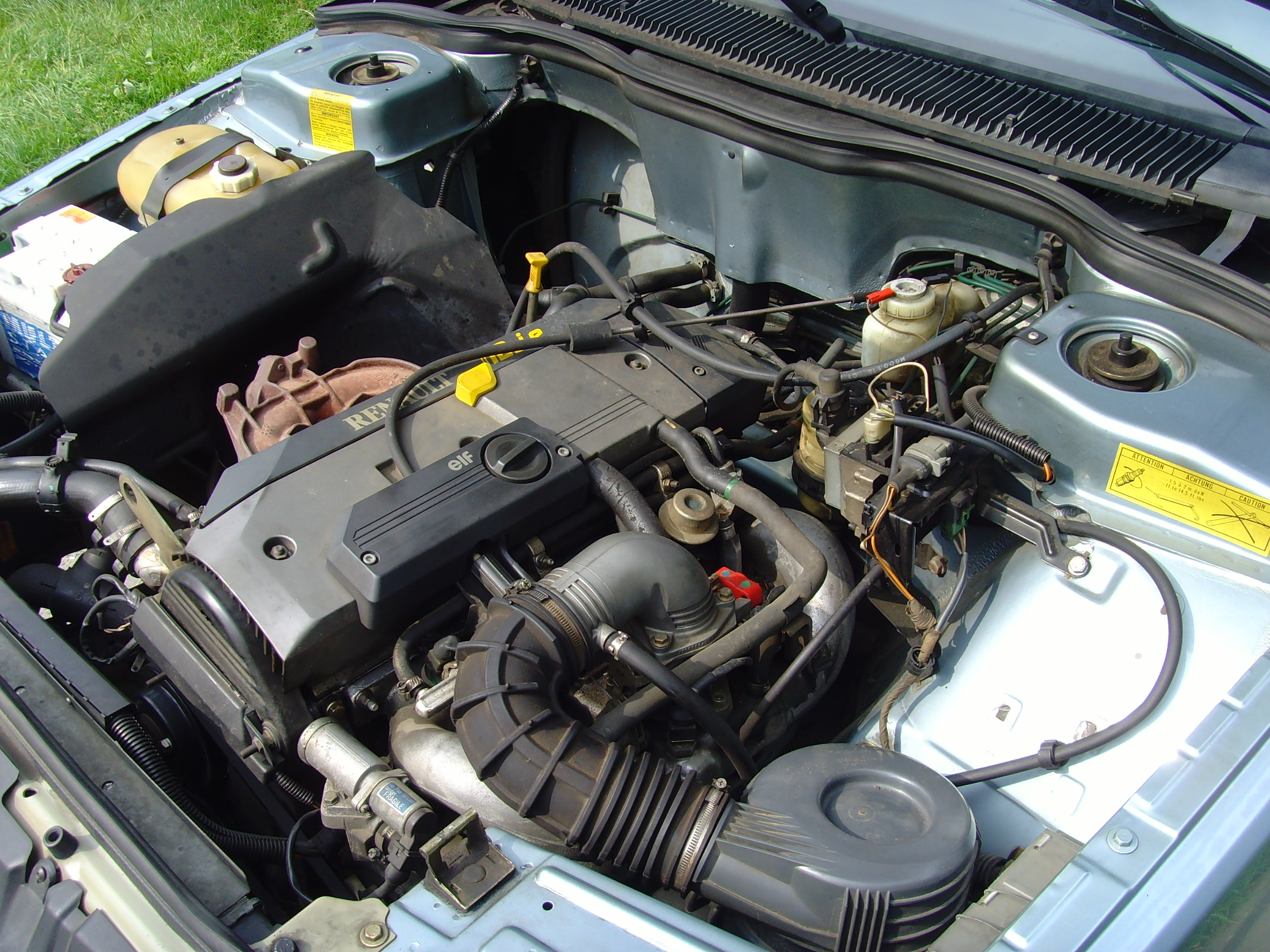

Overview
- Manufacturer: Française de Mécanique
- Also called: Douvrin, "J engine"
- Production: 1977–1996

Layout
- Configuration: Inline-four
- Displacement: 2.0–2.2 L (1,995–2,165 cc)
- Cylinder bore: 86 mm (3.39 in); 88 mm (3.46 in)
- Piston stroke: 82 mm (3.23 in); 89 mm (3.5 in)
- Cylinder block material: Aluminium alloy
- Cylinder head material: Aluminium alloy
- Valvetrain: SOHC 2 or 3 valves x cyl.
- Compression ratio: 8.8:1-9.8:1

RPM range
- Max. engine speed: 6,000

Combustion
- Turbocharger: Variable-nozzle (on some versions)
- Fuel system: Carburetor; Multi-point fuel injection
- Management: Bosch K-Jetronic, LE2-Jetronic, LU2-Jetronic, Renix
- Fuel type: Gasoline, Diesel
- Cooling system: Water-cooled

Output
- Power output: 64–175 PS (47–129 kW; 63–173 hp)
- Torque output: 16.9–19.2 kg⋅m (166–188 N⋅m; 122–139 lbf⋅ft)

Chronology
- Successor: XU engine (PSA); F-Type engine (Renault)(petrol); G-Type engine (Renault)(diesel)

The Douvrin family is an all-aluminum inline-four automobile engine designed in the early 1970s and produced from 1977 to 1996 by Compagnie Française de Mécanique, a joint-venture between PSA and Renault located in the town of Douvrin in northern France. This engine is designed by the engineer Jean-Jacques His (father of Formula 1 engines from Renault and Ferrari). It was produced in the same factory as the PRV V6, which also is sometimes known outside France as the "Douvrin" V6. The Douvrin engine is also referred to as the ZDJ/ZEJ engine by Peugeot, and as the J-type engine by Renault.

== Construction ==
This engine had an aluminium alloy block with cast iron liners, and an aluminium alloy head with one overhead camshaft driven by belt. Its displacement varied from 1995 to 2165 cc. This engine should not be confused with the PSA-Renault X-Type engine whose displacement varied from 954 to 1360 cc and had a gearbox integrated to the block. The Douvrin engine on the contrary, had a conventional (external) gearbox setup, and was longitudinally or transversely mounted depending on car model.

== 2.0 ==
The 2.0 L (1,995 cc) was an oversquare design with a single belt driven overhead camshaft, an 88 mm × 82 mm (3.46 in × 3.23 in) bore and stroke.

=== Applications ===
==== PSA ====
Code	Models	Power	Torque	Compression ratio	Valves	Fuel supply
829 A5	Citroën CX	108 PS (79 kW; 107 hp) at 5500 rpm	16.9 kg⋅m (166 N⋅m; 122 lbf⋅ft) at 3250 rpm	9.2:1	8	Carburetor
ZEJK 829B	Peugeot 505	110 PS (81 kW; 108 hp) at 5250 rpm	17.4 kg⋅m (171 N⋅m; 126 lbf⋅ft) at 4000 rpm	9.2:1	8	Bosch K-Jetronic mechanical multi-point fuel injection

==== Renault ====
It was produced in a variety of configurations for Renault:

- naturally aspirated 8-valve, single-barrel carburetor, 90 PS (66 kW; 89 hp), from 1978 to 1993
- naturally aspirated 8-valve, double-barrel carburetor, 110 PS (81 kW; 108 hp), from 1977 to 1992
- naturally aspirated 8-valve, multipoint, Bosch L(U/E) Jetronic fuel injection, 120 PS (88 kW; 118 hp) (107 PS (79 kW; 106 hp) with catalytic converter), from 1984 to 1989 (Catalytic converters required in North American market only.)
- naturally aspirated 8-valve, multipoint, BENDIX ECU-driven, fuel injection, 120 PS (88 kW; 118 hp) (107 PS (79 kW; 106 hp) with catalytic converter), from 1989 to 1996
- naturally aspirated 12-valve, multipoint fuel injection, 140 PS (103 kW; 138 hp), (136 PS (100 kW; 134 hp) with catalytic converter), from 1989 to 1996
- turbocharged 8-valve, multipoint fuel injection, 175 PS (129 kW; 173 hp) (162 PS (119 kW; 160 hp) with catalytic converter), from 1987 to 1993 (Catalytic converters fitted IAW EC directive in MY '89; now referred to as EURO III).
In the following models:
- Renault 18[1]
- Renault 20
- Renault 21
- Renault 25
- Renault Espace
- Renault Fuego
- Renault Safrane
- Renault Trafic

==== Others ====
- SIMI Cournil SCE15/25
- Auverland SC 11/200/250

== 2.2 ==
The 2.2 L (2,165 cc) version was derived from the 2.0 L (1,995 cc) by a stroke extension from 82 to 89 mm (3.23 to 3.50 in), making it an undersquare design. Most parts, including the cylinder head, were identical to those of the 2-liter unit.

This engine proved as reliable as its 2.0-liter counterpart. It is often confused with the somewhat similar 2.2 litre Chrysler Type 180 engine, which displaced 2.2 L (2,155 cc)

=== Applications ===
==== PSA ====
Code	Models	Power	Torque	Compression ratio	Valves	Fuel supply
J6T A500	Citroën CX	117 hp (86 kW) at 5600 rpm	18.1 kg⋅m (178 N⋅m; 131 lbf⋅ft) at 3250 rpm	9.8:1	8	Carburettor
ZDJK	Peugeot 505	117 hp (86 kW) at 5250 rpm	19.0 kg⋅m (186 N⋅m; 137 lbf⋅ft) at 3500 rpm	9.2:1	8	Bosch K-Jetronic multipoint mechanical fuel injection
ZDJL 851B	Peugeot 505	130 hp (96 kW) at 5750 rpm	19.2 kg⋅m (188 N⋅m; 139 lbf⋅ft) at 4250 rpm	9.8:1	8	Bosch LE2-Jetronic multipoint electronic fuel injection
ZDJL 851Y	Peugeot 505	130 hp (96 kW) at 5750 rpm	19.2 kg⋅m (188 N⋅m; 139 lbf⋅ft) at 4250 rpm	9.8:1	8	Bosch LE2-Jetronic multipoint electronic fuel injection
ZDJL 851X	Peugeot 505	117 hp (86 kW) at 5750 rpm	19.2 kg⋅m (188 N⋅m; 139 lbf⋅ft) at 4250 rpm	8.8:1	8	Bosch LU2-Jetronic multipoint electronic fuel injection with catalytic converter

==== Renault ====
Renault offered the 2.2 in fewer configurations than the smaller version:

- normally aspirated 8-valve, double-barrel carburetor, 110 PS (81 kW; 108 hp), from 1977 to 1992
- normally aspirated 8-valve, multipoint fuel injection, 121 PS (89 kW; 119 hp) (107 PS (79 kW; 106 hp) with catalytic converter), from 1983 to 1996
- normally aspirated 12-valve, multipoint fuel injection, 137 PS (101 kW; 135 hp), from 1989 to 1996
In the following models:
- Renault Espace
- Renault Fuego
- Renault 18
- Renault 20
- Renault 21
- Renault 25
- Renault Master
- Renault Medallion
- Renault Safrane

==== Others ====
- 1987–1989 Eagle Medallion
- 1983–1992 Winnebago LeSharo (built on Trafic chassis and cab)
- 1983–1992 Itasca Phasar (built on Trafic chassis and cab)

== 2.1 Diesel ==
The 2.1 L (2,068 cc) Diesel version was derived from the 2.0 L (1,995 cc) petrol version by a bore reduction from 88 to 86 mm (3.46 to 3.39 in) and a stroke extension from 82 to 89 mm (3.23 to 3.50 in). Cast-iron cylinder liners were used to withstand the higher compression ratio of Diesel combustion. The cylinder head was a Ricardo-type pre-chamber design fed by a mechanically controlled fuel pump. This engine was only used by Renault in three versions:

- normally aspirated 8-valve, 64 PS (47 kW; 63 hp), from 1979 to 1992
- turbocharged 8-valve, 88 PS (65 kW; 87 hp), from 1982 to 1992 - 1),2)
- turbocharged 8-valve with variable-nozzle, 92 PS (68 kW; 91 hp), from 1990 to 1996

- Garrett T2 turbocharged 8-valve version was fitted by AMC-Renault in the 1984-1987 Jeep Wagoneer, Cherokee and Comanche models
- Garrett T3 turbocharged 8-valve version was fitted by AMC-Renault in the 1983-1986 Winnebago Lesharo/Itasca Phasar, based on the Renault Trafic I 'P'latform chassis, albeit only in FWD, LWB designs.

Applications:
- Renault 18
- Renault 20
- Renault 21
- Renault 25
- Renault 30
- Renault Fuego
- 1992–1996 Renault Safrane
- Renault Espace
- Renault Trafic
- Renault Master
- 1983–1986 Winnebago LeSharo (built on Trafic chassis and cab)
- 1983–1986 Itasca Phasar (built on Trafic chassis and cab)
- Jeep Cherokee (XJ)
- Jeep Comanche

== See also ==
- List of PSA engines
- List of Renault engines
- List of engines used in Chrysler products
