= Winnebago LeSharo =

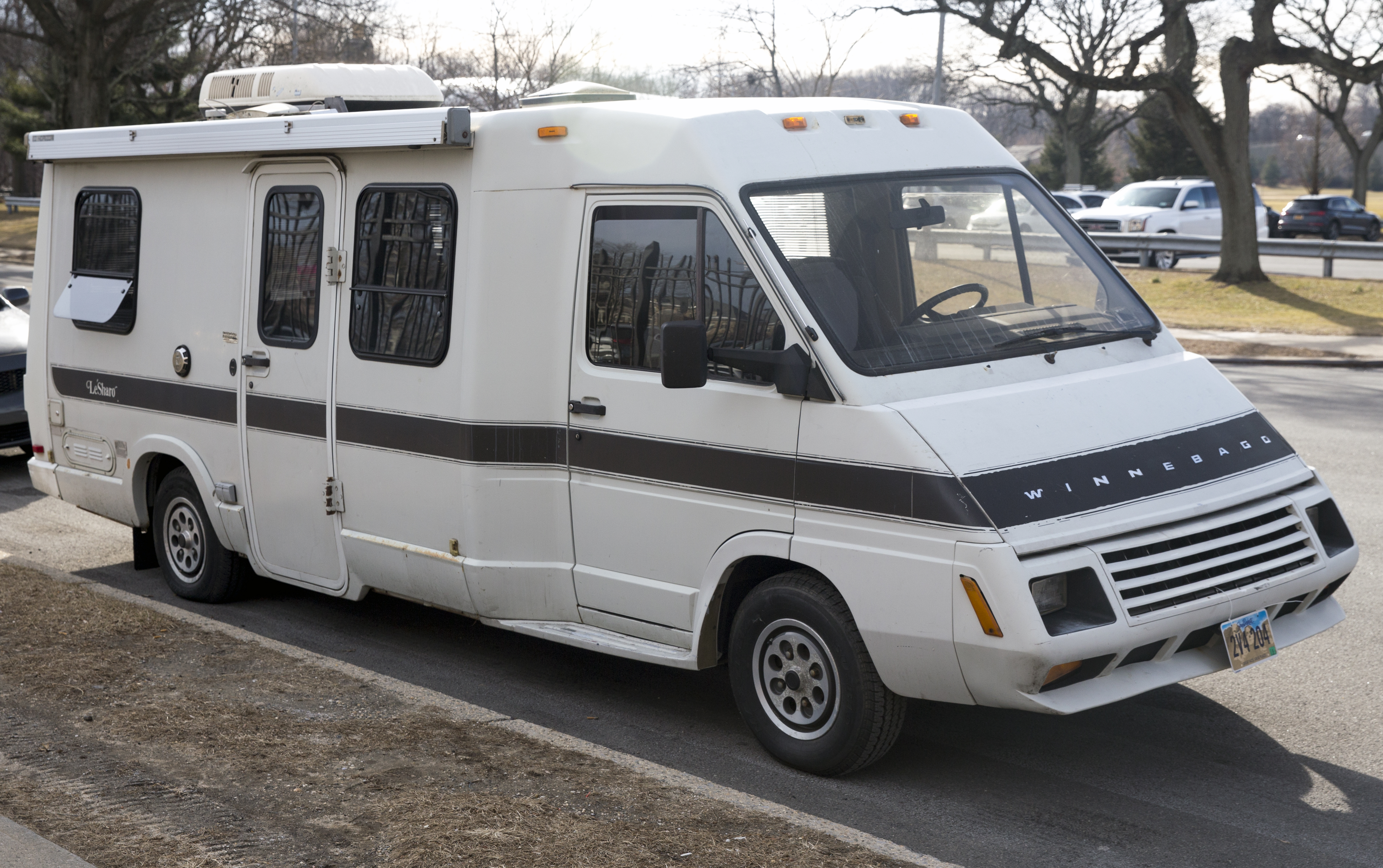
- 1988 Winnebago LeSharo (facelift model)

Overview
- Manufacturer: Winnebago
- Also called: Winnebago Centauri; Itasca Phasar
- Production: August 1982-September 1991
- Model years: 1983-1992
- Assembly: Forest City, Iowa

Body and chassis
- Class: Recreational Vehicle (Class B)
- Body style: 3-door RV 4-door van
- Layout: FF layout
- Related: Renault Trafic Mk1

Powertrain
- Engine: gasoline: 2.2 L J7T I4; diesel: 2.1 L J8S I4; 2.1 L J8S turbo I4
- Power output: 57hp-103hp
- Transmission: 4-speed manual 5-speed manual 3-speed automatic

Dimensions
- Wheelbase: 145 in (3,683 mm)
- Length: 235–250 in (5,969–6,350 mm)
- Width: 86.3–88 in (2,192–2,235 mm)
- Height: 84.5–99 in (2,146–2,515 mm)

Chronology
- Successor: Winnebago Rialta

The Winnebago LeSharo (also marketed as Itasca Phasar) is a Class B (low-profile) recreational vehicle that was assembled by Winnebago Industries from 1983 to 1992. Although it also used a cutaway van chassis like larger motorhomes, the LeSharo was designed to optimize fuel economy with an aerodynamically enhanced exterior.

The vehicle used the chassis of the Renault Trafic commercial van. Though Renault did not sell the model line itself in North America, the Trafic shared its gasoline and diesel engines with several Renault and Jeep vehicles marketed in the United States (at the time, Renault was the parent company of AMC/Jeep). Less than half the weight of a Class C RV based on an American-produced chassis, the LeSharo offered fuel economy from 16 to 23 MPG, depending on powertrain.

Winnebago assembled the model line in Forest City, Iowa; it produced about 21,000 examples. For 1995, the company revived the concept with the Winnebago Rialta, using the Volkswagen Eurovan chassis.

== First generation (1983-1986) ==
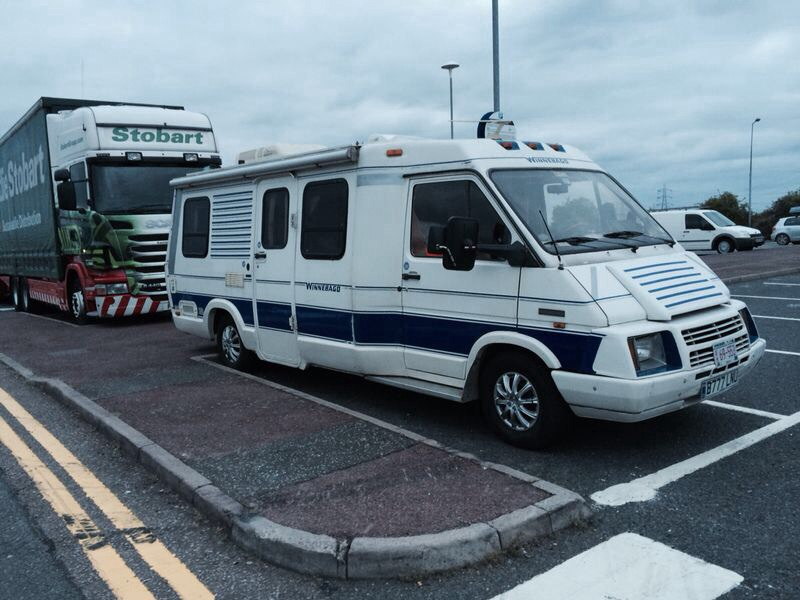
1983-1984 Winnebago LeSharo in Europe

The 1973 and 1979 fuel crises negatively affected American vehicle manufacturing, particularly recreational vehicle production, at the end of the decade. In response, Winnebago sought to develop a fuel-efficient compact RV, as vehicles based on one-ton van chassis at the time typically offered fuel economy of 4-10 MPG (with larger RVs doing worse). The company sought a European light commercial vehicle, preferably with a front-wheel drive powertrain layout to maximize living space (as used by the GMC Motorhome), leading to an agreement with Renault, using its Trafic chassis.

Winnebago introduced the 1983 LeSharo in August 1982, serving as its first compact RV. Approximately half the weight of a Minnie Winnie (based on a "one-ton" cutaway van), the LeSharo retained a cutaway van configuration. For North America, the Renault Trafic was supplied as a chassis cab with no rear lighting fitments; to support the larger body, the 20 cm (8 in) wider rear axle from the B80 Renault Master was adopted. To downplay its Renault origins, the front fascia was restyled below the hood (supplied with headlamps from the Buick Skylark). To accommodate the wider rear body, the LeSharo was fitted with repositioned side-view mirrors.

=== Powertrain details ===
At launch, the LeSharo was fitted with a 57 hp 2.1L naturally aspirated diesel inline-four paired with a 4-speed manual transmission; in 1984, a turbocharger increased output to 75 hp. The engine was later shared with the Jeep Cherokee and Jeep Comanche (Renault was the parent company of AMC/Jeep).

For 1985, a 2.2-liter gasoline engine was introduced, raising output to 100 hp. Renault sourced the engine from its North American car line (the 18i and Fuego); in a change welcomed by buyers, the 2.2-liter engine was paired with a 3-speed automatic transmission. Though 25% more powerful, the new engine added over 400 pounds of curb weight.

For 1986, the diesel engines were dropped entirely. Although average fuel economy dropped below 20MPG, the gasoline model could maintain acceptable highway speeds. A heavy-duty rear axle was introduced for the chassis (remaining standard for the remainder of production). To comply with US emissions regulations, the LeSharo was equipped with a catalytic converter (made by Teneco Walker's European division) and a carbon canister (from GM).

=== Model range ===
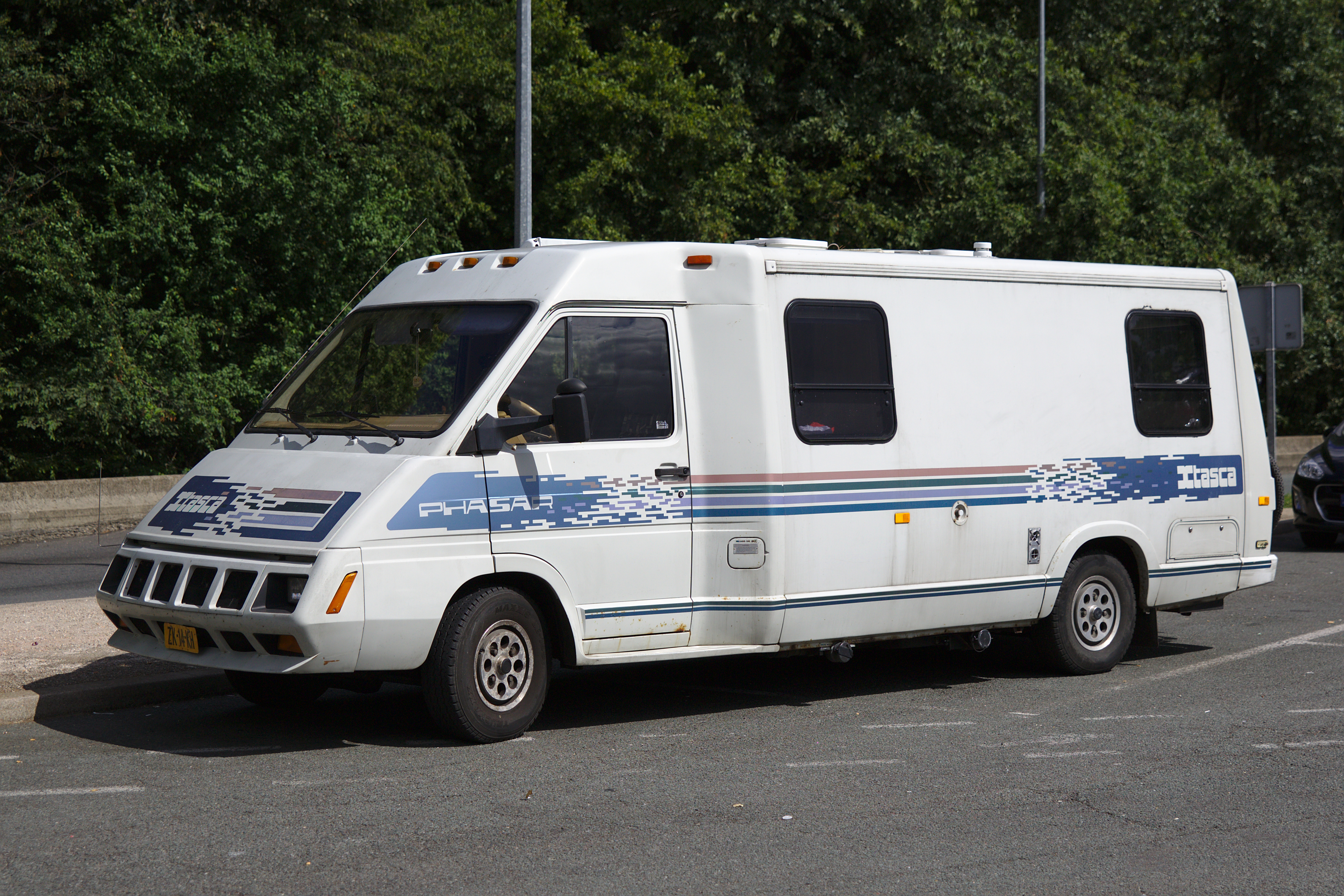
Phasar, version of the LeSharo marketed through Winnebago premium brand Itasca.

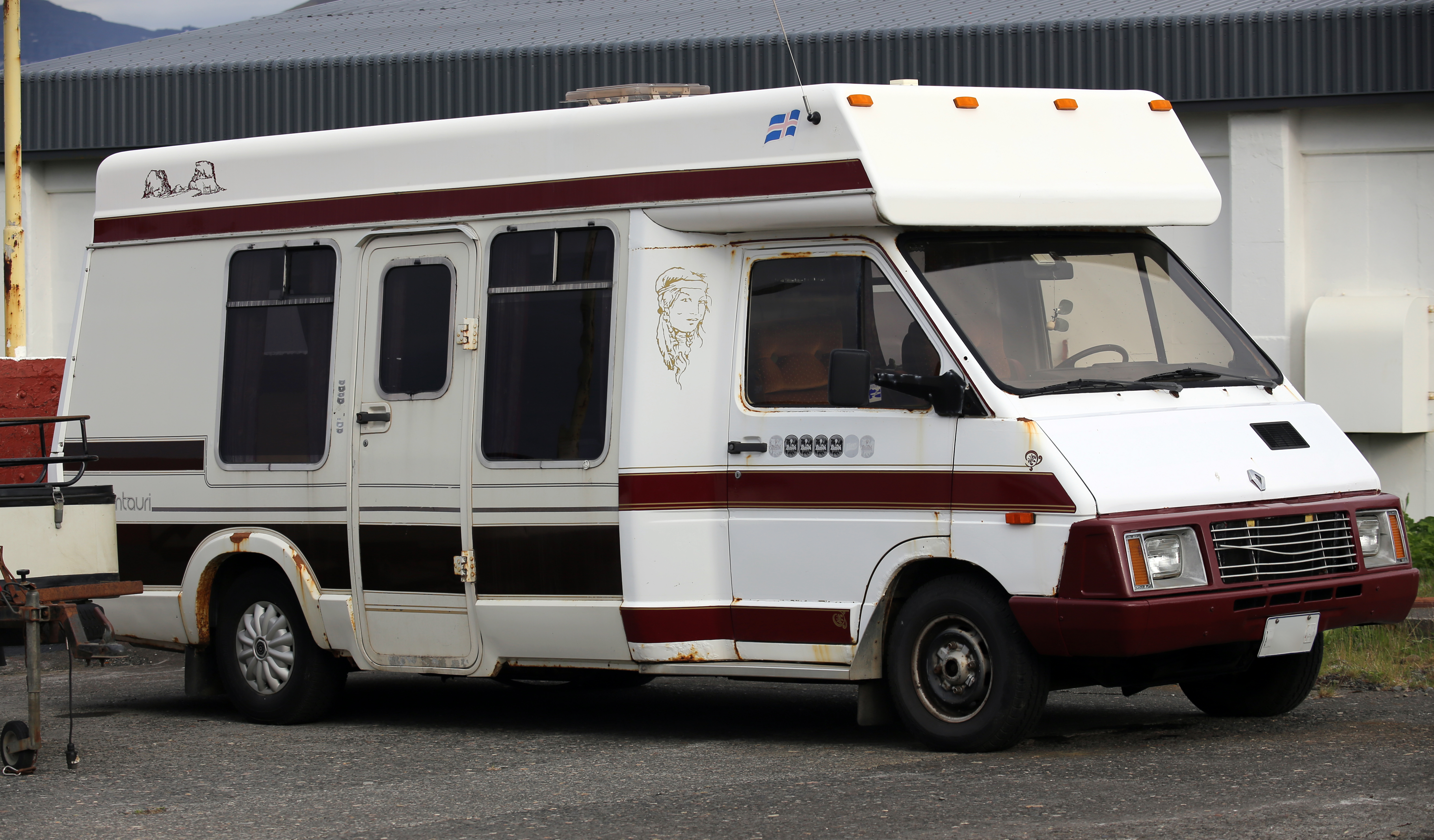
Winnebago Centauri (modified)

Winnebago launched the LeSharo as part of a four-vehicle model range. The low-roof Winnebago LeSharo and premium Itasca Phasar were recreational vehicles, seating and sleeping four people. A high-roof version of the vehicle was marketed as the Winnebago Centauri 7-seat conversion van.; the variant was not produced from 1986 to 1989.

Essentially a shell version of the Centauri, the Winnebago Utility Van was a 2-seat vehicle that was produced from 1983 to 1992.

== Second generation (1987-1992) ==
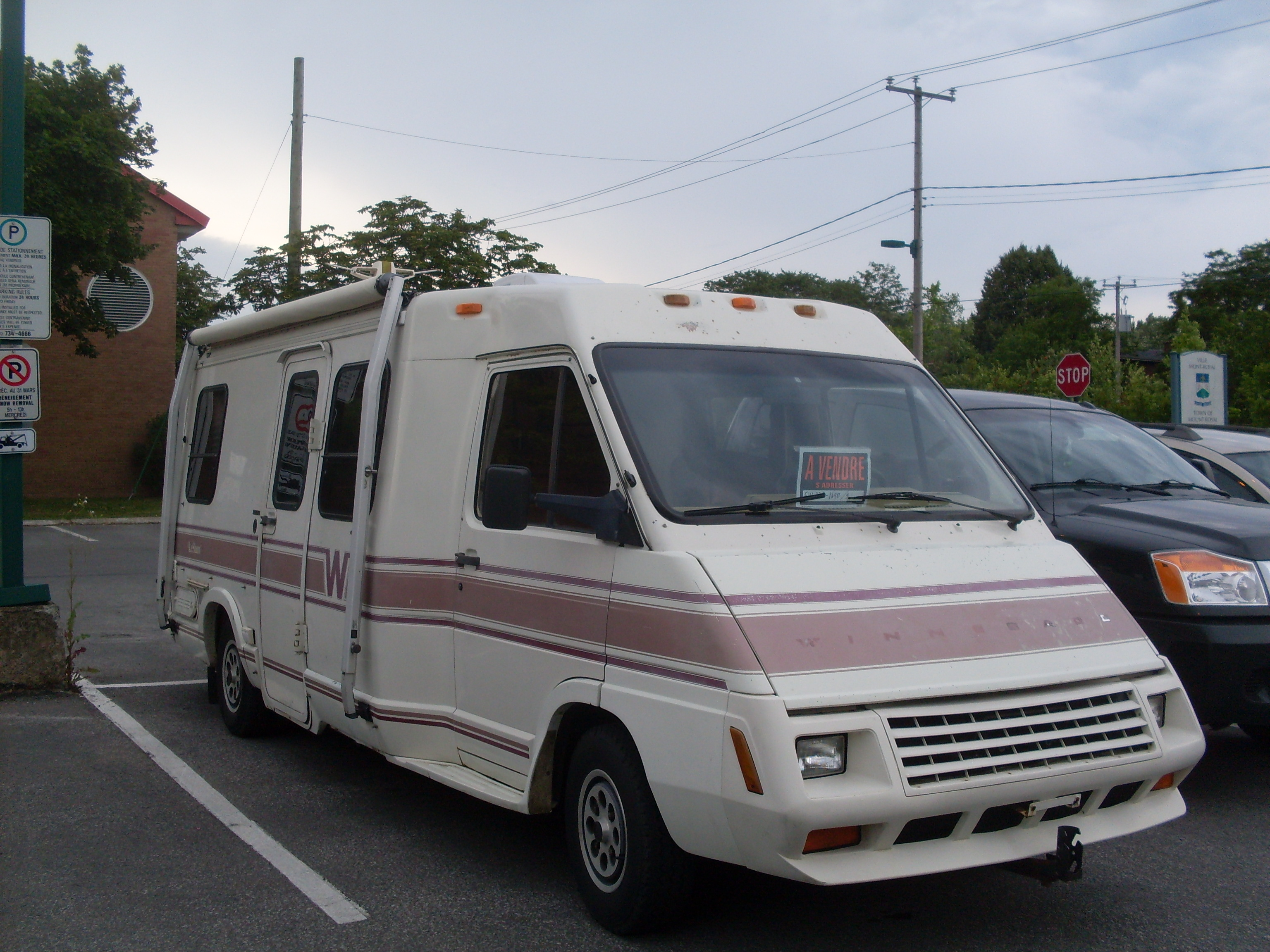
Facelift Winnebago LeSharo

In 1987, the LeSharo/Phasar and the Utility Van underwent their first body redesign. Growing slightly in height (97 inches to 99 inches), the design optimized aerodynamics to further improve fuel economy, with a sleeker front body and recessed front headlights no longer sourced from GM. The rear body adopted a larger window and enclosed the spare tire within the bodywork.

Overall, the GVWR increased over 800 pounds, from 5,830 lbs to 6,677 lbs.

For 1988, the model line introduced a 5-speed manual transmission, the first optional transmission with the 2.2L engine.

In 1989, the Utility Van ended production, with the Centauri passenger van (dormant since 1985) returning. Though the 2.2L engine remained, Renault changed the fuel-injection unit from Bosch to Bendix-based, changing output slightly to 103 hp.

By 1990, the 5-speed manual was discontinued, with all vehicles produced solely with an automatic transmission.

== Epilogue ==
Winnebago ended its chassis-supply agreement with Renault after the 1992 model year, retiring the LeSharo/Phasar model lines. Consequently, Renault ceased importation of the Trafic van chassis, ending its presence in North America (the next French vehicle imported in the United States was the 2005 Bugatti Veyron).

=== Winnebago Rialta ===
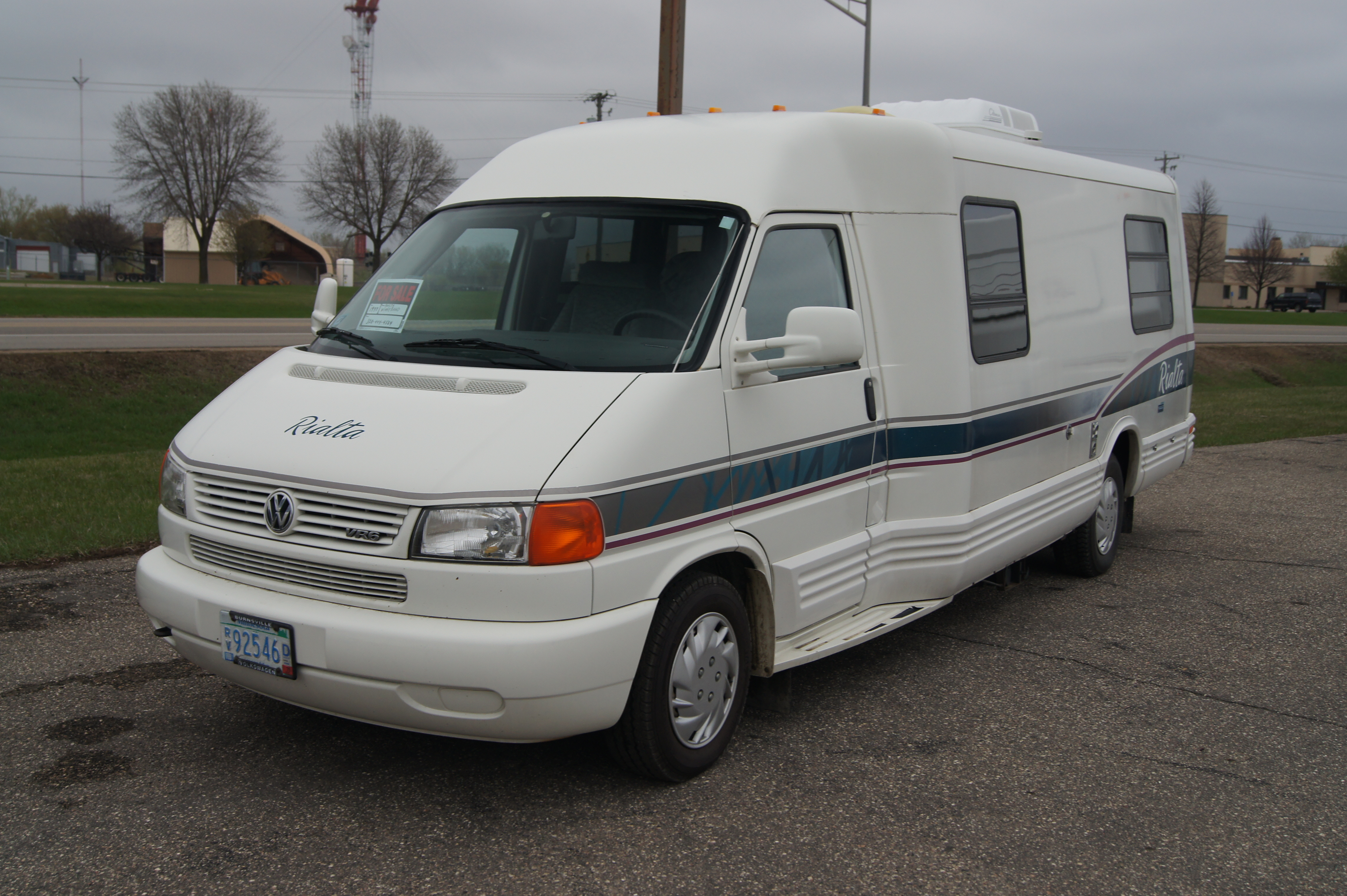
1997 Winnebago Rialta, successor design using chassis of Volkswagen EuroVan (Transporter T4)

After LeSharo ended production, Winnebago began developing a new van-based RV, debuting the Winnebago Rialta for 1995. Similar in configuration to the LeSharo, the Rialta used a longer-wheelbase version of the Volkswagen EuroVan (Transporter T4) chassis. Alongside a narrower-body campervan (also produced by Winnebago), the Rialta reintroduced the T4 to the US (Volkswagen discontinued the passenger van after 1992). Initially fitted with a 110 hp 2.5L inline-5, a 2.8L VR6 (140 hp, later 201 hp) was introduced for 1996).

While VW ended imports of the T4 Transporter after 2003, Winnebago continued assembly of Rialtas through 2005, until it depleted its stockpile of T4 chassis cabs.

=== Mobility RV ===
In 1999, Winnebago sold the parts and product support rights to the LeSharo and its variants to Mobility RV (MRV). Now responsible for product support and assistance for the model line, the company owns both parts inventories of the model lines sourced from Winnebago authorized dealers and is the exclusive importer of Renault replacement parts, owning all relevant manufacturing tooling to sell both inventories online (to support the LeSharo). The sale effectively ends all liability for service warranties from Winnebago Industries through its dealer network, as authorized dealerships discontinued the units for service, sales, or parts.
