= Renault 21 =

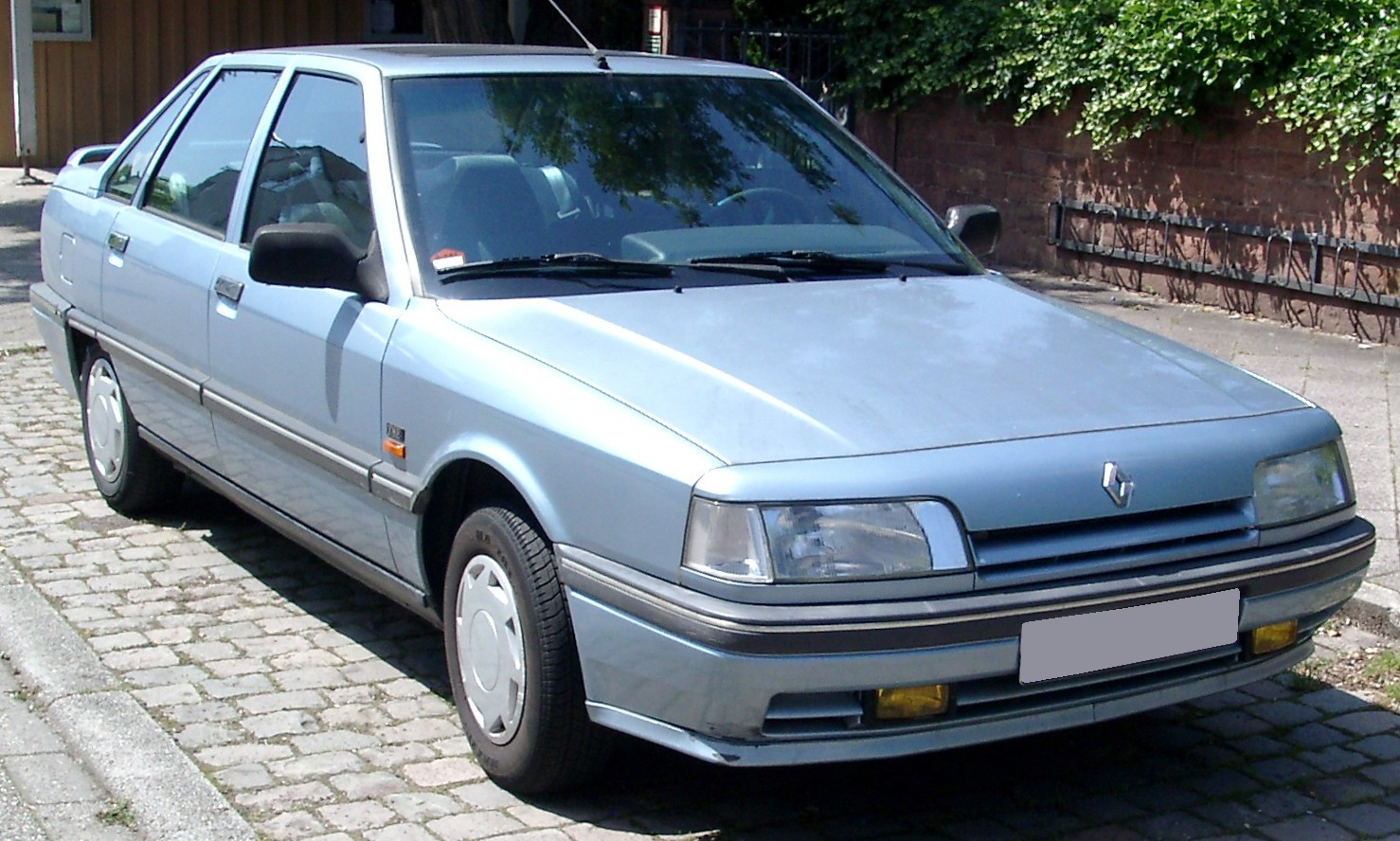

Overview
- Manufacturer: Renault
- Also called: Eagle Medallion (U.S. & Canada); Renault Étoile (Colombia); Renault Medallion
- Production: 1986–1995; 1990–1995 (Turkey)
- Assembly: France: Maubeuge (MCA); Turkey: Nilüfer, Bursa (Oyak-Renault); Colombia: Envigado (SOFASA); Argentina: Córdoba (Renault Argentina); Chile: Los Andes (Cormecánica); Taiwan: Taichung (Sanfu Motors); Belgium: Haren-Vilvoorde (RIB); Iran: Tehran (SAIPA); Venezuela: Mariara
- Designer: Giorgetto Giugiaro at Italdesign

Body and chassis
- Class: Mid-size car/Large family car (D)
- Body style: 4-door saloon 5-door Nevada; 5-door liftback
- Layout: Transverse front-engine, front-wheel drive; Longitudinal front-engine, front-wheel drive; Longitudinal front-engine, all-wheel drive

Powertrain
- Engine: Petrol: 1397 cc C2J I4; 1565 cc C2L I4 (Latin America); 1721 cc F2N/F3N I4; 1995 cc J6R/J7R I4; 1995 cc J7R 12V I4; 1995 cc J7R turbo I4; 2165 cc J7T I4; Diesel: 1870 cc F8Q I4; 2068 cc J8S-736 I4; 2068 cc J8S-852 turbo I4
- Transmission: 5-speed manual 3- or 4-speed automatic

Dimensions
- Wheelbase: 2,600 mm (102.4 in) saloon 2,750 mm (108.3 in) estate
- Length: 4,462 mm (175.7 in) saloon 4,644 mm (182.8 in) estate
- Width: 1,715 mm (67.5 in)
- Height: 1,415 mm (55.7 in) saloon 1,421 mm (55.9 in) estate
- Curb weight: 1,190 kg (2,624 lb)

Chronology
- Predecessor: Renault 18
- Successor: Renault Laguna

The Renault 21 is a large family car produced by French automaker Renault between 1986 and 1995. It was also sold in North America initially through American Motors dealers as the Renault Medallion and later through Jeep-Eagle dealers as the Eagle Medallion. A total of 2,096,000 units were produced.

The Renault 21 saloon was launched in the beginning of 1986, as the successor to the successful Renault 18, and this was followed a few months later by the seven seater station wagon, the R21 Nevada, marketed as the Savanna in the United Kingdom. In 1987, What Car? awarded the Renault 21 GTS Best Family Saloon. The Renault 21 Savanna was awarded Car of the Year, as well as Best Family Estate.

== Design ==
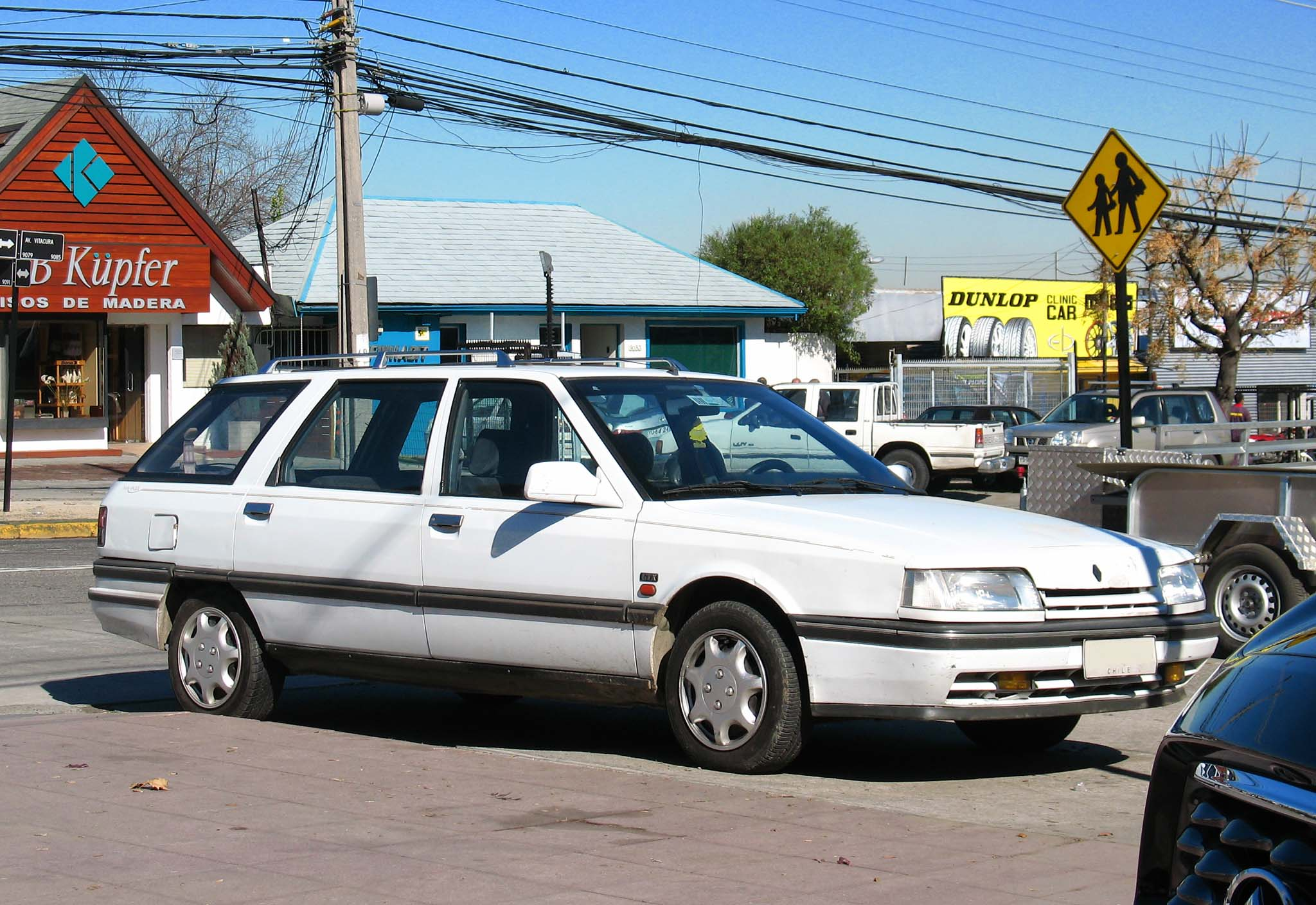
1993 Renault 21 GTX Nevada

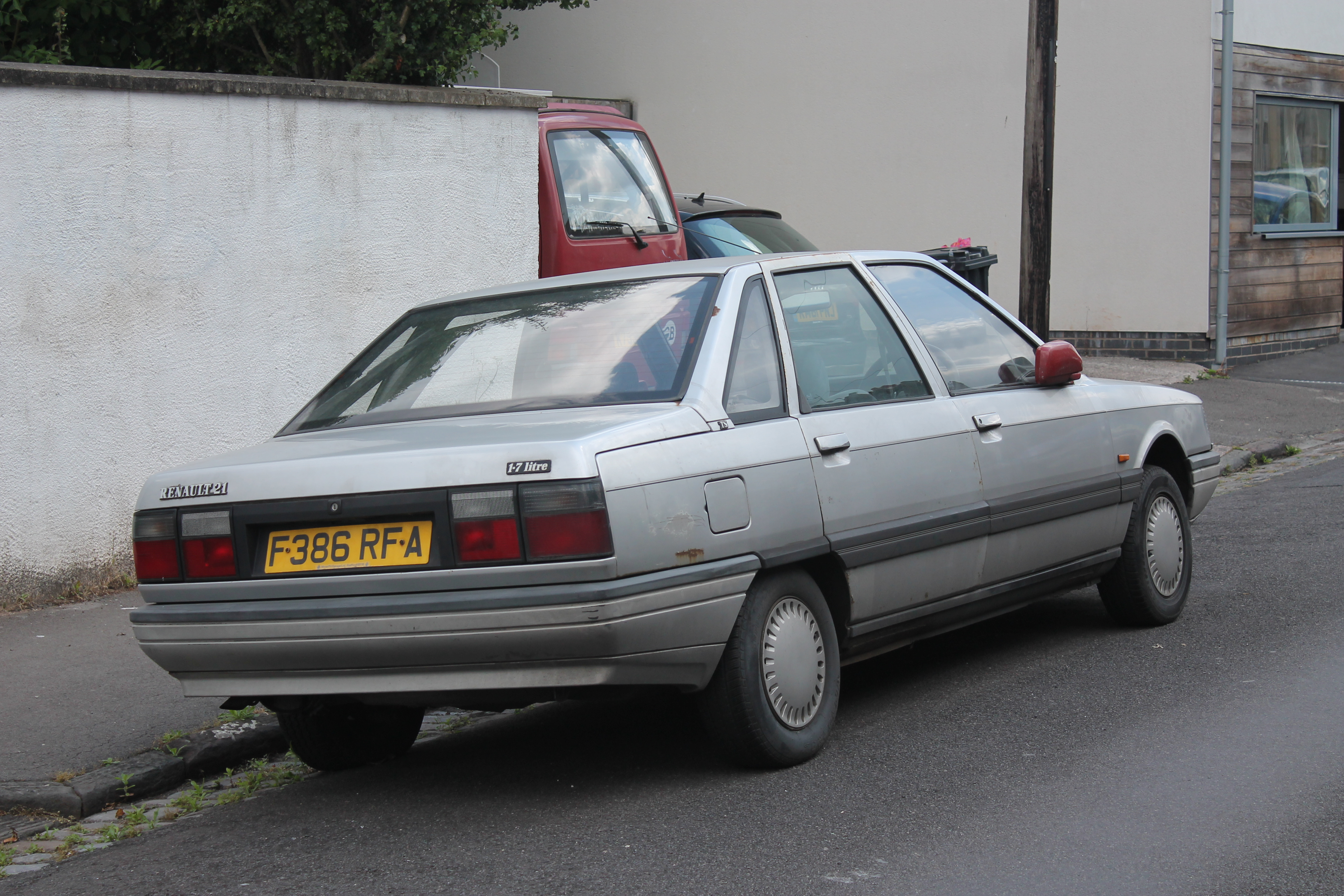
Rear view of Renault 21 (pre-facelift)

Unusually, the Renault 21 was offered with disparate engine configurations. The 1.7 litre version featured a transverse engine and transmission, but Renault had no gearbox suitable for a more powerful transverse engine: accordingly, faster versions featured longitudinally mounted engines. The two versions featured (barely perceptibly) different wheel bases: the engines were all relatively compact four-cylinder units and the engine bay was large enough to accept either configuration without reducing passenger space.

However, at a time when production technologies were relatively inflexible, the need to assemble differently configured engine bays on a single production line, along with the supplementary inventory requirements imposed both on Renault and on the dealership network, did compromise the Renault 21's profitability.

The Nevada/Savanna station wagon/estate version was slightly longer than the saloon, and was available configured with seven seats, two of those a forward-facing foldable bench seat for children (up to about age 10) that used up much of the luggage space when up. It had roof rack side rails as standard.

== History ==
First unveiled on 20 November 1985 and officially launched in February 1986, the R21 gave Renault a new competitor in this sector after eight years of the R18, which was declining in popularity after a very strong start to its commercial life. It had a razor like design, which was different from contemporary cars of the era, e.g. the Ford Sierra (with its "jelly mould" design) and the Opel Ascona.

It was sold in right hand drive for the United Kingdom from June 1986.

The car was revamped considerably in May 1989, both technically and aesthetically – the new sleeker outward appearance was similar to the also recently revamped Renault 25, and a liftback body style was also added to the range (which soon became more popular than the saloon in France) along with a sporty 2.0 L Turbo version. Of the saloons, the TXi 2.0 12v and 2.0 turbo were also available with the four-wheel-drive Quadra transmission. The Nevada wagons received four-wheel-drive in the eight-valve 2.0 and in the naturally aspirated 2.1 Diesel, as the 12-valve and the turbo were not available with this body style. The front-wheel-drive 21 Turbo was capable of 227 km/h (141 mph). At the 1989 Frankfurt Motor Show the fuel injected 2.2i model was introduced, originally reserved for the German market (being a different model than the earlier 2.2s built for the US) where insurance and tax regulations suited larger engines with less peak power. Injected engines were equipped by Renix engine control unit, developed by a joint venture by Renault and Bendix. This car was also available with four-wheel-drive, exclusively as a Nevada.

The Renault 21 liftback and saloon petrol models ceased production in the beginning of 1994, following the launch of the all new Laguna liftback, but the diesels and the Nevada/Savanna remained on the market, until their replacement Laguna variants were launched (end of 1994 for the diesels, and end of 1995 for the Nevada/Savanna).

A Renault 21 TSE, donated as a personal gift to Václav Havel by the president of Portugal Mário Soares just before the Velvet Revolution, served for a while as the official state car of the President of Czechoslovakia in 1989.

== Other markets ==
=== Argentina ===
The R21 was built in Argentina at the Renault facility in Santa Isabel (Córdoba Province) from late 1988 until early 1996. Production continued in Argentina for some years after its demise in European markets. Two body styles were built: saloon and Nevada (station wagon). It has been equipped with both petrol and diesel engines, (carburetor for the early production, fuel injection for the later engines).

The available engines ranged from 1.8 litres (92CV carbureted/95CV injection), 2.0 litres (110CV without catalytic converter/105CV with catalytic converter), up to 2.2 litres (120CV without catalytic converter/110CV with catalytic converter), as well as the 2.1-litre diesel version (72CV)

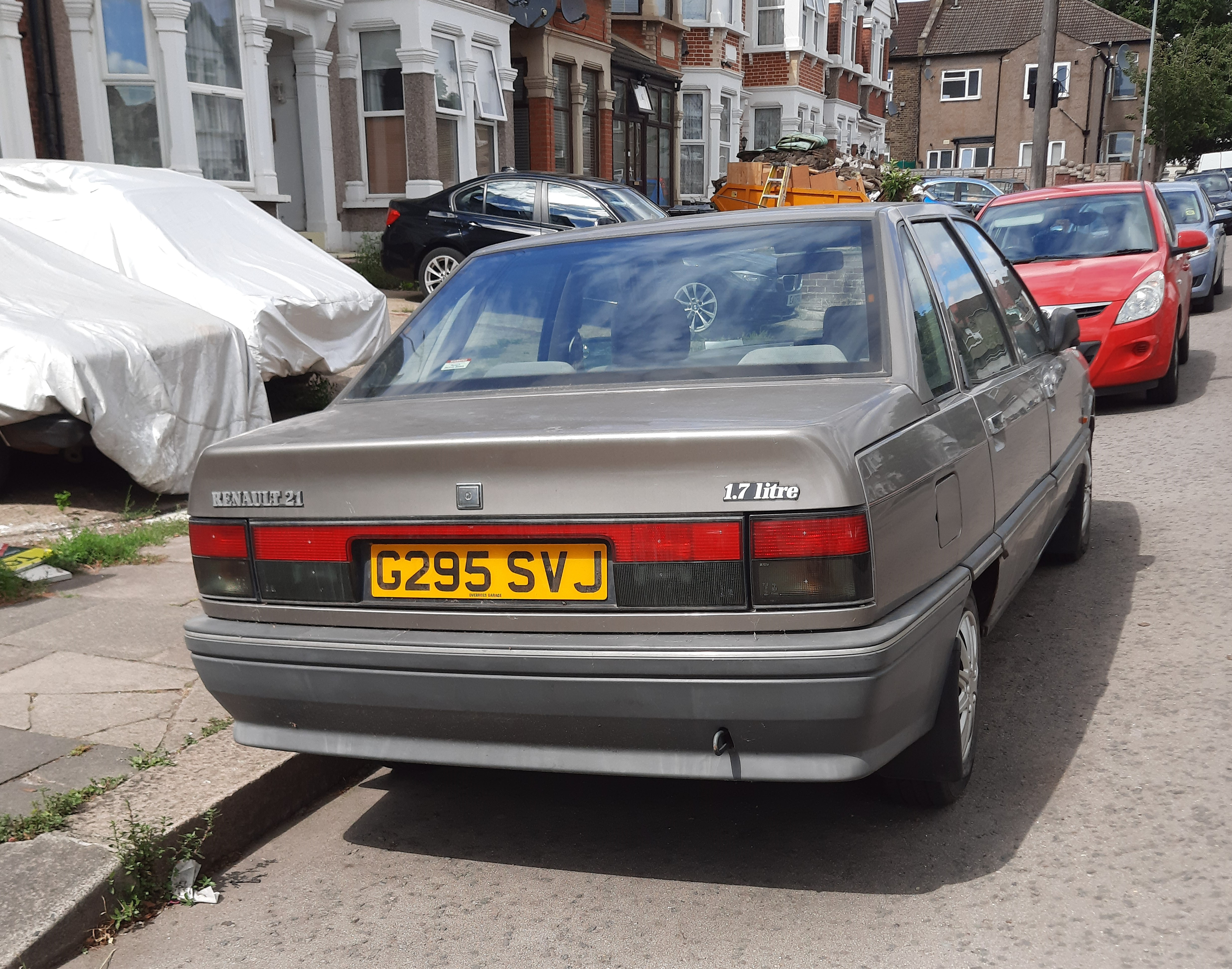
Rear view of Renault 21 (post-facelift)

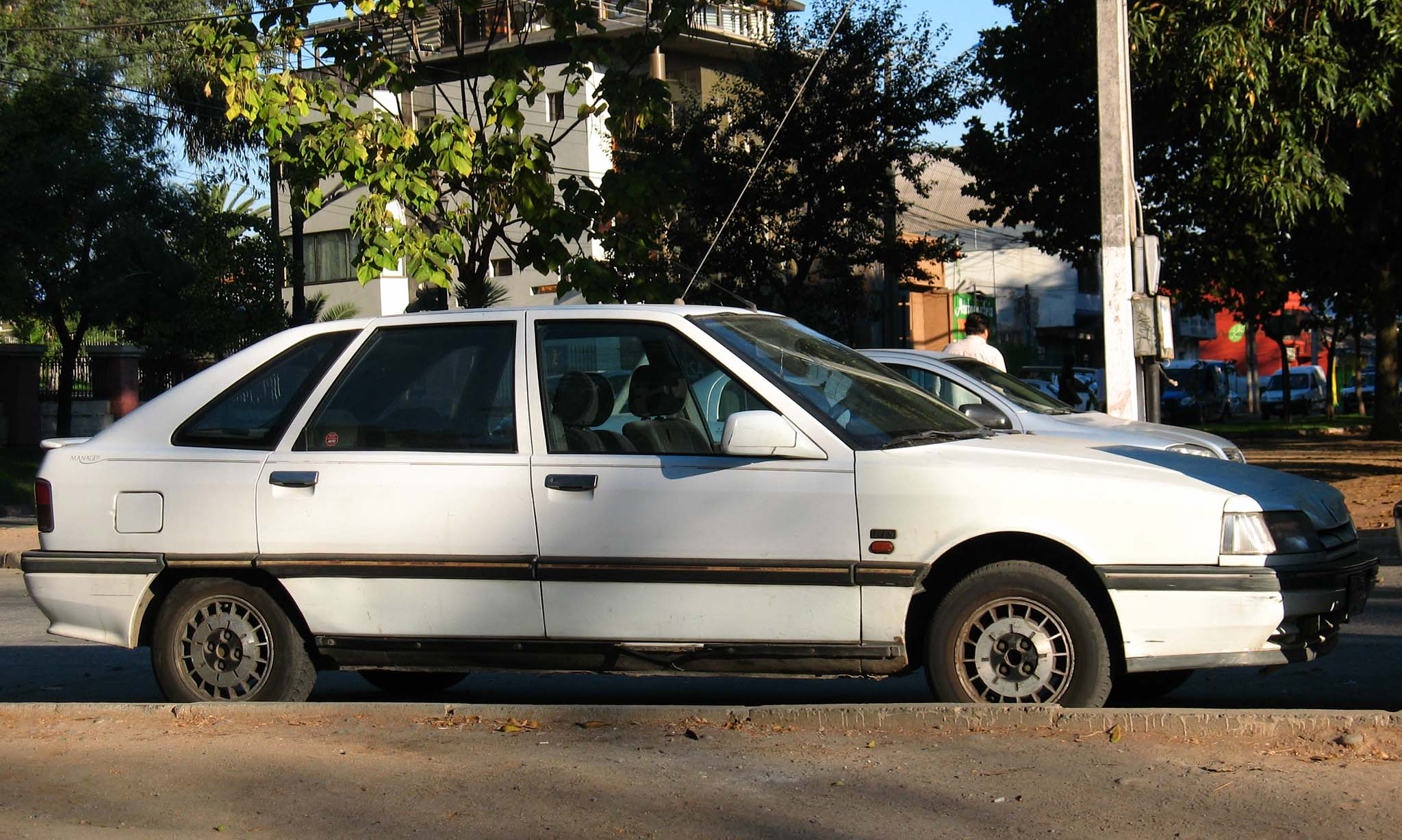
1993 Renault 21 2.0 GTS Manager liftback

The liftback was imported from France and called by the trim "Alizé". It was replaced for the Laguna.

=== Turkey ===
The R21 was manufactured in Turkey in the early 1990s, with two different engines and in three different trim levels. The entry level model was simply the 21 (1.7 L), the mid-range trim was called 21 Manager (1.7 L, 90 PS), and at the top-of-the-line sat the 2.0-litre fuel injected "Concorde." Later on, the lower cost 1.6-litre "Optima" and the "Manager 2000" with a 2 L, 122 PS engine were introduced. The Oyak-built Renault 21 was produced and sold up to the end of 1996 in Turkey.

=== United States and Canada ===
The R21 was also sold in the United States and Canada from 1987 to 1988 as the Renault Medallion and later in 1988 until the end of the line in 1989 as the Eagle Medallion with the 2.2 L engine as the only powerplant. However, the car was only on sale for a few months in 1987 before Renault sold its investment in American Motors Corporation (AMC) to Chrysler. AMC dealers were now under the newly formed Jeep-Eagle Division of Chrysler, and now as Jeep-Eagle dealers, they continued to sell the car as the Eagle Medallion until 1989. The North American version had somewhat different styling to comply with front and rear impact regulations and different lighting standards.

=== Colombia ===
The 21 was launched in Colombia in 1987. Initially, it was only available with the four-door saloon body with the 2.0 L longitudinal engine. In October of the same year, the Renault 21 Nevada was launched, with the same engine as the saloon. in 1989 Sociedad de Fabricación de Automotores S.A. (SOFASA) launched a version called RS with the 1.6-litre C2L engine, also used in the TXE version of the Renault 9. In 1990, the name was replaced by the Étoile. This was the first car with electronic fuel injection assembled in Colombia. The three available versions available were:

- TS Saloon, Break, Penta (hatchback body) Engine 1.6 L 73 PS (54 kW; 72 hp), manufactured until 1994
- TX with engine 2.0 L 100 PS (74 kW; 99 hp)
- TXi after called Bravo: engine 2.2 L 128 PS (94 kW; 126 hp).

== Engines ==
- 1.4 L (1397 cc) petrol OHV 8 valve I4; 68 PS (50 kW; 67 hp); top speed: 165 km/h (103 mph) (Turkish development from C series block, called C2J, also available in Portugal and Yugoslavia)
- 1.4 L (1397 cc) petrol OHV 8 valve I4; 70 PS (51 kW; 69 hp); top speed: 168 km/h (104 mph)
- 1.6 L (1565 cc) petrol OHV 8 valve I4; 73 PS (54 kW; 72 hp); top speed: 165 km/h (103 mph); 0–100 km/h: 12.0 s (Argentinian development from C-series block, called C2L, available in Argentina and Colombia)
- 1.7 L (1721 cc) petrol SOHC 8 valve I4 carb.; 76 PS (56 kW; 75 hp); top speed: 173 km/h (107 mph); 0–100 km/h: 12.0 s (Available in TL and TLE models)
- 1.7 L (1721 cc) petrol SOHC 8 valve I4 SPI; 75 PS (55 kW; 74 hp); top speed: 172 km/h (107 mph); 0–100 km/h: 12.5 s
- 1.7 L (1721 cc) petrol SOHC 8 valve I4 carb.; 90 PS (66 kW; 89 hp); top speed: 185 km/h (115 mph); 0–100 km/h: 10.7 s (Available in TS, RS, GTS and TSE models)
- 1.7 L (1721 cc) petrol SOHC 8 valve I4 carb.; 88 PS (65 kW; 87 hp); top speed: 181 km/h (112 mph)
- 1.7 L (1721 cc) petrol SOHC 8 valve I4 MPI; 95 PS (70 kW; 94 hp); top speed: 185 km/h (115 mph); 0–100 km/h: 10.7 s
- 2.0 L (1995 cc) petrol SOHC 8 valve I4 MPI; 135 PS (99 kW; 133 hp); top speed: 220 km/h (137 mph); 0–100 km/h: 10.9 s (Available in GTX and TXE models)
- 2.0 L (1995 cc) petrol SOHC 12 valve I4; 136 PS (100 kW; 134 hp); top speed: 230 km/h (143 mph) ; 0–100 km/h: 9.2 s (available in the TXi and TXi Quadra models)
- 2.0 L (1995 cc) petrol SOHC 8 valve I4 MPI turbo; 175 PS (129 kW; 173 hp); top speed: 227 km/h (141 mph); 0–100 km/h: 7.4 s (available in Turbo and Turbo Quadra models).
- 2.0 L (1995 cc) petrol SOHC 8 valve I4 MPI turbo; 175 PS (129 kW; 173 hp); top speed: 222 km/h (138 mph); 0–100 km/h: 7.8 s
- 2.2 L (2165 cc) petrol SOHC 8 valve I4 MPI; 110 PS (81 kW; 108 hp); top speed: 192 km/h (119 mph) ; 0–100 km/h: 9.9 s
- 1.9 L (1870 cc) diesel SOHC 8 valve I4; 65 PS (48 kW; 64 hp); top speed: 160 km/h (99 mph); 0–100 km/h: 16.0 s (available in SD and GSD models)
- 2.1 L (2068 cc) diesel SOHC 8 valve I4; 67 PS (49 kW; 66 hp); top speed: 164 km/h (102 mph) ; 0–100 km/h: 15.6 s (available in TD and GTD models)
- 2.1 L (2068 cc) diesel SOHC 8 valve I4; 73 PS (54 kW; 72 hp); top speed: 170 km/h (106 mph) ; 0–100 km/h: 15.1 s
- 2.1 L (2068 cc) diesel SOHC 8 valve I4 turbo; 88 PS (65 kW; 87 hp); top speed: 177 km/h (110 mph) ; 0–100 km/h: 11.8 s
