= Peugeot 504 =

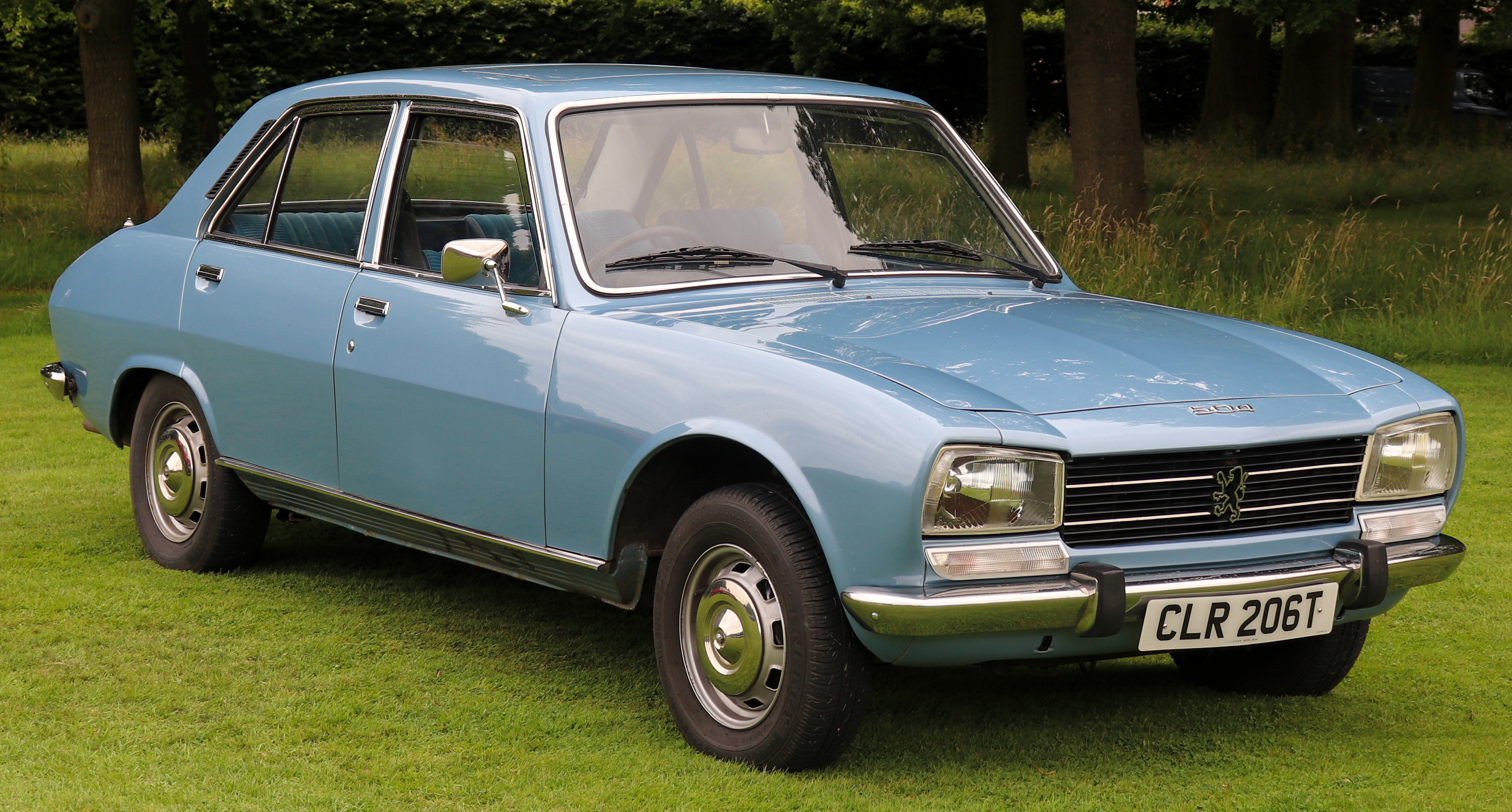

Overview
- Manufacturer: Peugeot SA
- Also called: Guangzhou-Peugeot GP 7200 (China)
- Production: 1968–1983 (France); 1969–1999 (Argentina); 1989–1997 (China); 1975–2004 (Kenya); 1975–2006 (Nigeria); 1970–1985 (South Africa); 1977–1980 (Spain); 1979–1984 (Taiwan)
- Assembly: France: Sochaux (Sochaux Plant); Argentina: Buenos Aires (Sevel); Australia: Heidelberg, Victoria (Renault Australia Pty Ltd.); Chile: Los Andes (Automotores Franco Chilena S.A.); China: Guangzhou (GPAC); Egypt: Cairo (AAV); Kenya: Mombasa; Morocco: Casablanca (Sopriam); New Zealand: Thames (Campbell Motor Industries); Nigeria: Kaduna (PAN); Portugal: Setúbal (Movauto); South Africa: Natalspruit, Transvaal; South Africa: Pretoria (Sigma); Spain: Vigo (Vigo Plant); Thailand: Bangkok (Yontrakit Group); Taiwan: Changhua (Yǔtián); Tunisia: Sousse; Uruguay: Montevideo (Nordex S.A.)
- Designer: Aldo Brovarone at Pininfarina

Body and chassis
- Class: Large family car (D)
- Body style: 4-door saloon 5-door estate 2-door coupé 2-door convertible 2-door coupé utility (pickup); 4-door coupé utility (pickup)
- Layout: FR layout

Powertrain
- Engine: Petrol: 1618 cc XC5 I4 (pickup only); 1796 cc XM I4; 1971 cc XN I4; 2664 cc ZM (PRV) V6; Diesel: 1948 cc XD88 I4; 2112 cc XD90 I4; 2304 cc XD2 I4
- Transmission: 4-speed manual BA7; 5-speed manual 3-speed automatic ZF 3HP12/22; 3-speed automatic GM 407 (V6)

Dimensions
- Wheelbase: 2,740 mm (107.9 in) (saloon/berline); 2,900 mm (114.2 in) (break/pickup); 2,550 mm (100.4 in) (coupé/cabriolet)
- Length: 4,486 mm (176.6 in) (saloon/berline); 4,800 mm (189.0 in) (break)
- Width: 1,690 mm (66.5 in)
- Height: 1,460 mm (57.5 in)
- Curb weight: 1,200–1,300 kg (2,646–2,866 lb)

Chronology
- Predecessor: Peugeot 404
- Successor: Peugeot 505; Peugeot 406 Coupé (for 504 Coupé)

The Peugeot 504 is a mid-size, front-engine, rear-wheel-drive automobile manufactured and marketed by Peugeot from 1968 to 1983 over a single generation, primarily in four-door sedan and wagon configurations – but also as twin two-door coupé and cabriolet configurations as well as pickup truck variants.

The sedan (berline) was styled by Aldo Brovarone of Pininfarina, and the coupé and cabriolet twins were styled by Franco Martinengo at Pininfarina, with wagon (break and familiale) and pickup (camionette) designed and sketches produced in-house at Peugeot.

The 504 was noted for its robust body structure, long suspension travel, high ground clearance, large wheels and torque tube driveshaft – enclosed in a rigid tube attached at each end to the gearbox housing and differential casing, relieving drivetrain torque reactions. The 504 ultimately achieved widespread popularity in far-flung rough-terrain countries – including Latin America and much of Africa.

More than three million 504s were manufactured in its European production, with production continuing globally under various licensing arrangements – including 27,000 assembled in Kenya and 425,000 assembled in Nigeria, using knock-down kits – with production extending into 2006.

Having debuted as Peugeot's flagship at the 1968 Paris Salon, the 504 received the 1969 European Car of the Year. In 2013, the Los Angeles Times called it "Africa's workhorse."

== History ==
=== Introduction ===
Marketed as Peugeot's flagship saloon car, the 504 made its public debut on 12 September 1968 at the Paris Salon. The press launch which had been scheduled for June 1968 was at the last minute deferred by three months, and production got off to a similarly delayed start because of the political and industrial disruption which exploded across France in May 1968.

The 504 was a sunroof-equipped four-door saloon, introduced with a carbureted 1,796 cc four-cylinder petrol engine 60 kW (82 PS; 81 hp) DIN with 71 kW (97 PS; 96 hp) on tap with the optional fuel injection. At the time of introduction, Peugeot still used the SAE rating, with claimed power numbers of 87 and 103 cv respectively. Much of its mechanics was based on those of the Peugeot 404, but new were the independent rear suspension and the disc brakes on all four wheels. A column-mounted four-speed manual transmission was standard; a three-speed ZF 3HP12 automatic became available with the carburetted engine beginning in February 1969. In September 1969 the automatic's shifter location was moved from the steering column to the floor.

The 504 was elected European Car of the Year in 1969, praised for its styling, build quality, chassis, ride, visibility, strong engine and refinement. 1969 was also when the 504 reached the Australian market.

The 504 Injection two-door coupé and two-door cabriolet were introduced at the Salon de Geneva in March 1969. The engine produced the same 71 kW (97 PS; 96 hp) of output as in the fuel-injected saloon, but the final drive ratio was slightly revised to give a slightly higher road speed of 20.6 mph (33.2 km/h) at 1,000 rpm. Unlike the saloons, the coupé and cabriolet received a floor shifter.

Available models:

- 504 4-door saloon
- 504 Injection 4-door saloon
- 504 Injection 2-door coupé
- 504 Injection 2-door cabriolet

=== 1970 ===
The 504 received a new four-cylinder 1971 cc engine, rated at 68 kW (93 PS; 92 hp) (carburated) and 76 kW (104 PS; 103 hp) (fuel-injected). At the 1970 Paris Salon a four-cylinder 2112 cc diesel engine rated at 48 kW (65 PS; 64 hp) was introduced. The 1796 cc petrol engine was no longer available in 504 saloons.

In September 1970 an estate ("Break") was presented, featuring a higher rear roof, lengthened wheelbase, and a solid rear axle with four coil springs instead of the saloon's independent rear suspension. It was joined by the 7-seat "Familiale", which had all its occupants facing forward in three rows of seats. The Break/Familiale/Commerciale did not actually go on sale until April the following year. The Break and Familiale both received the 2-liter petrol engine or 2.1 diesel as per the saloon, but the utilitarian "Commerciale" brought back the 1.8-litre four, now tuned down to 54 kW (73 PS; 72 hp). There was also a Commerciale diesel, using the 39 kW (53 PS; 52 hp), 1.95-liter XD88 from the 404 Diesel, enough for a top speed of 118 km/h (73 mph). The Commerciale had a stripped down interior, with a different dashboard, no carpeting in the cargo area, and seats without headrests. It also received lightly reinforced suspension, single round headlights (seen again on pickups from 1979 on), missing chrome around the side windows, and some trim parts such as the rear view mirrors were painted rather than chromed.

In late 1970 an automatic option was added to the coupé and cabriolet - this was never a large seller and was not always available to the cabriolet but continued to be offered until 1983; in total about 2,500 of the two-door 504s received this transmission option.

Models

- 504 Commerciale 5-door utility wagon
- 504 4-door saloon/5-door Break/Familiale
- 504 Injection 4-door saloon
- 504 Commerciale Diesel 5-door utility wagon
- 504 Diesel 4-door saloon/5-door Familiale
- 504 Injection 2-door coupé
- 504 Injection 2-door cabriolet

=== 1971 ===
During 1971 the Break SL ("Super Luxe") was introduced, a better equipped version using the carburetted 2.0-liter engine. Unlike the regular wagons, the SL received metallic paint, plusher upholstery, and various other additional equipment.

=== 1972 ===
During the year, fuel injected 504 saloons changed to a floor-mounted shifter on cars equipped with the manual transmission as well. The 504 Commerciale dropped the round headlights in favor of the standard units.

=== 1973 ===
In April 1973, because of the oil crisis Peugeot presented the 504 L. It featured a coil sprung live rear axle and reintroduced the smaller 1796 cc engine, now rated at 58 kW (79 PS; 78 hp) or 60 kW (81 PS; 80 hp) for the L Automatique. The different rear axle required somewhat more space; this required some alterations to the floor pan which meant marginally less boot space and rear headroom. At around the same time, the lineup was revamped as listed below. Also new was the 1.95-litre 504 LD saloon, matching the Commerciale diesel although producing 41 kW (56 PS; 55 hp). The power of the Commerciale diesel dropped to 37 kW (50 PS; 49 hp) at the same time. The L saloons can be recognized by the missing bumper overriders and inside by the simpler dashboard with horizontal instrument cluster. Also during 1973, the column shifters were replaced by floor mounted ones on all other 504 saloons than the L.

Models

- 504 L saloon (1.8 carb)
- 504 GL saloon (2.0 carb)
- 504 TI saloon (2.0 injection)
- 504 LD saloon (1.95 diesel)
- 504 GLD saloon (2.1 diesel)
- 504 Commerciale (1.8 carb)
- 504 Break/Break SL/Familiale (2.0 carb)
- 504 Commerciale Diesel (1.95 diesel)
- 504 Familiale Diesel (2.1 diesel)
- 504 Coupé (2.0 injection)
- 504 Cabriolet (2.0 injection)

=== 1974 ===
In August 1974 the second series 504 was introduced. The most noticeable change was the new, more flush fitting doorhandles, and new wheels with rectangular rather than oval openings on the GL and TI models. The GL and TI also received a new, more padded steering wheel. Additionally, the 2.0's double carburettor was changed from the Solex SEIA to a Zenith INAT (with no change in power), while the liftgate on the estates changed from steel springs to gas struts.

At the 1974 October Motor Show Peugeot presented a more powerful engine for the 504 coupé and cabriolet, now fitted with a "PRV" 2664 cc V6 unit developed in collaboration with Renault and Volvo. This was the same engine that would be used for the 604 berline, to be introduced at Geneva five months later, in March 1975. The engine incorporated various innovative features such as an aluminium cylinder block, and a fuel-feed system that employed carburetors of differing type, one (type 34 TBIA) featuring a single chamber controlled directly according to the movement of the accelerator pedal, and the second being a twin chamber carburetor (type 35 CEEI) designed to operate simultaneously with the first, using a pneumatic linkage. Maximum output for the 504 coupé and cabriolet fitted with this new V6 engine was given as 100 kW (136 PS; 134 hp), supporting a top speed of 186 km/h (116 mph). During 1975, the first full year of production, 2643 of these six-cylinder 504 coupés and cabriolet were produced, which was considered a respectable number although dwarfed by the 236,733 four-cylinder 504 berlines (saloons/sedans) and breaks (estates/station wagons) produced by Peugeot in France in the same year. Following the launch of the six-cylinder cars, the four-cylinder versions of the coupé and cabriolet 504s were delisted: they returned to the showrooms in 1978 in response, it was reported, to customer demand.

=== 1975 ===
The Break and Break SL were renamed L and GL. The 504 TI received power windows in the rear as well.

=== 1976 ===
At the Paris Motor Show of October 1976 an enlarged diesel engine was introduced for the 504 GLD saloon. The stroke of 83 mm (3.3 in) remained the same as that of the existing 2112 cc diesel motor, but for the larger engine the bore was increased to 94 mm (3.7 in), giving an overall 2304 cc along with an increase in claimed power output from 48 to 51 kW (65 to 70 PS; 64 to 69 hp). Briefly, the 2.1 diesel was not offered on any 504 saloons. The 2112 cc diesel engine would also find its way into the Ford Granada since Ford did not at the time produce a sufficient volume of diesel sedans in this class to justify the development of their own diesel engine. From August 1976 on, the power of the 2-liter petrol engines increased marginally, to 71 and 78 kW (96 and 106 PS; 95 and 105 hp) for the carburetted and fuel injected engines respectively. The grille on the 504 L models was changed from the original chromed metal piece to a black, plastic unit. The 504 TI gained power steering.

=== 1977 ===
In September 1977, the 2.3-liter diesel found its way into the new GLD Break and the Familiale Diesel, while the Break L now received a downtuned version of the old 2.1-liter unit, producing 43 kW (59 PS; 58 hp). Also new was the option of an automatic transmission for the 2.3 diesel (saloons only). The old 1.9-liter diesel was discontinued, and the basic 504 saloons dropped the "L" designation, gaining a black plastic dash and the steering wheel from the GL/TI in the process. The new 504 diesel saloon was fitted with the erstwhile, 48 kW (65 PS; 64 hp) 2.1-liter diesel engine that had graced the GLD until the introduction of the 2.3.

The coupé and cabriolet saw the reintroduction of the fuel injected 2.0-liter engine, a response to slow sales of the thirsty V6. The V6 coupé gained a five-speed manual transmission and fuel injection for 106 kW (144 PS; 142 hp), while the V6 cabriolet was discontinued after only 970 examples had been built in three years.

=== 1979 to 1983 ===
Peugeot 504 production in Europe was pruned back in 1979 with the launch of the Peugeot 505, although the 504 Pickup was introduced as a replacement for the 404 Pickup for the 1980 model year. The last European-made example rolled off the production line in 1983, although the pick up version continued in production, and was available in Europe until 1993. More than three million 504 passenger cars were produced in Europe. The 505 shared most of the Peugeot 504 mechanical parts, similarly to the Peugeot 604 and Talbot Tagora.

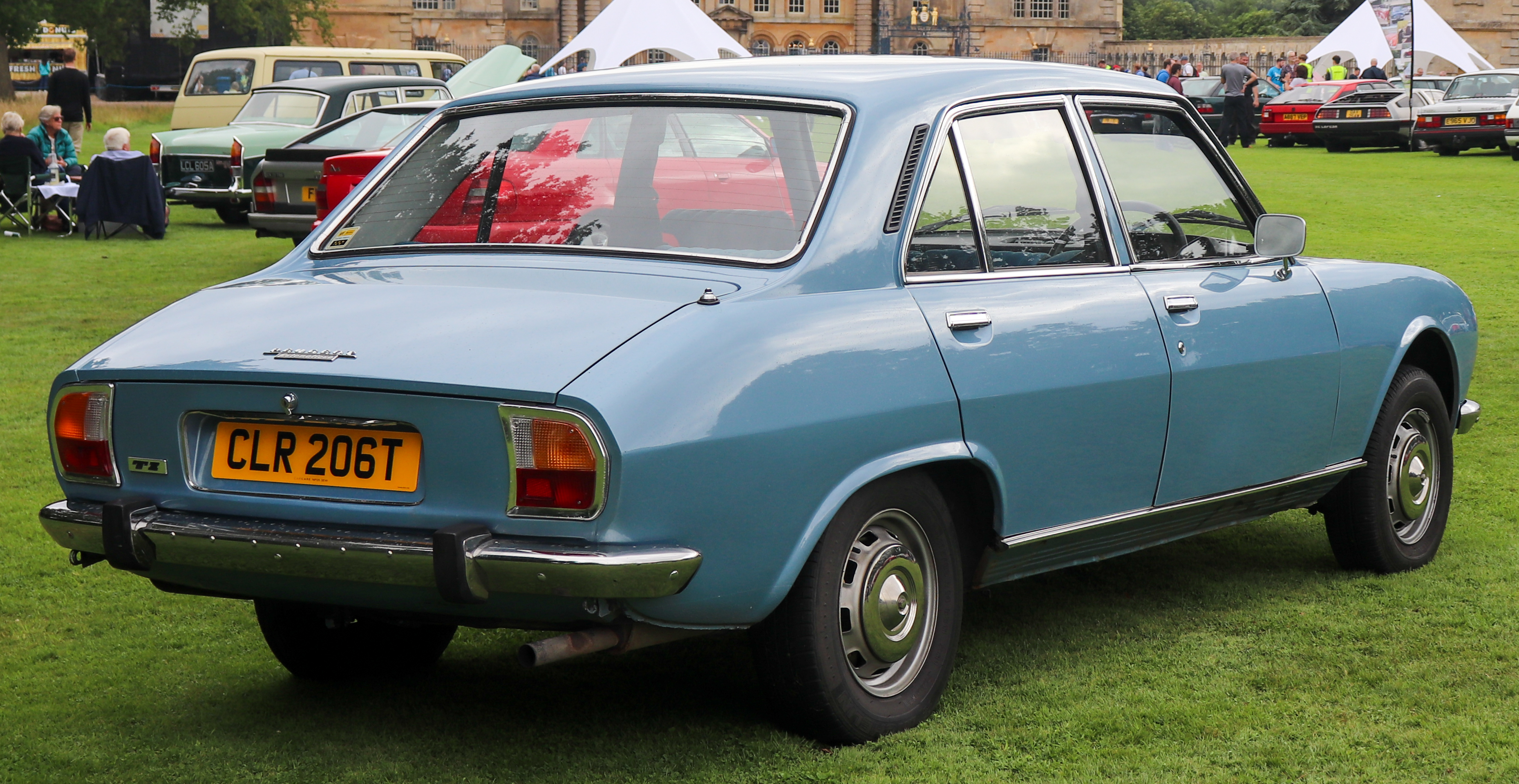
Saloon

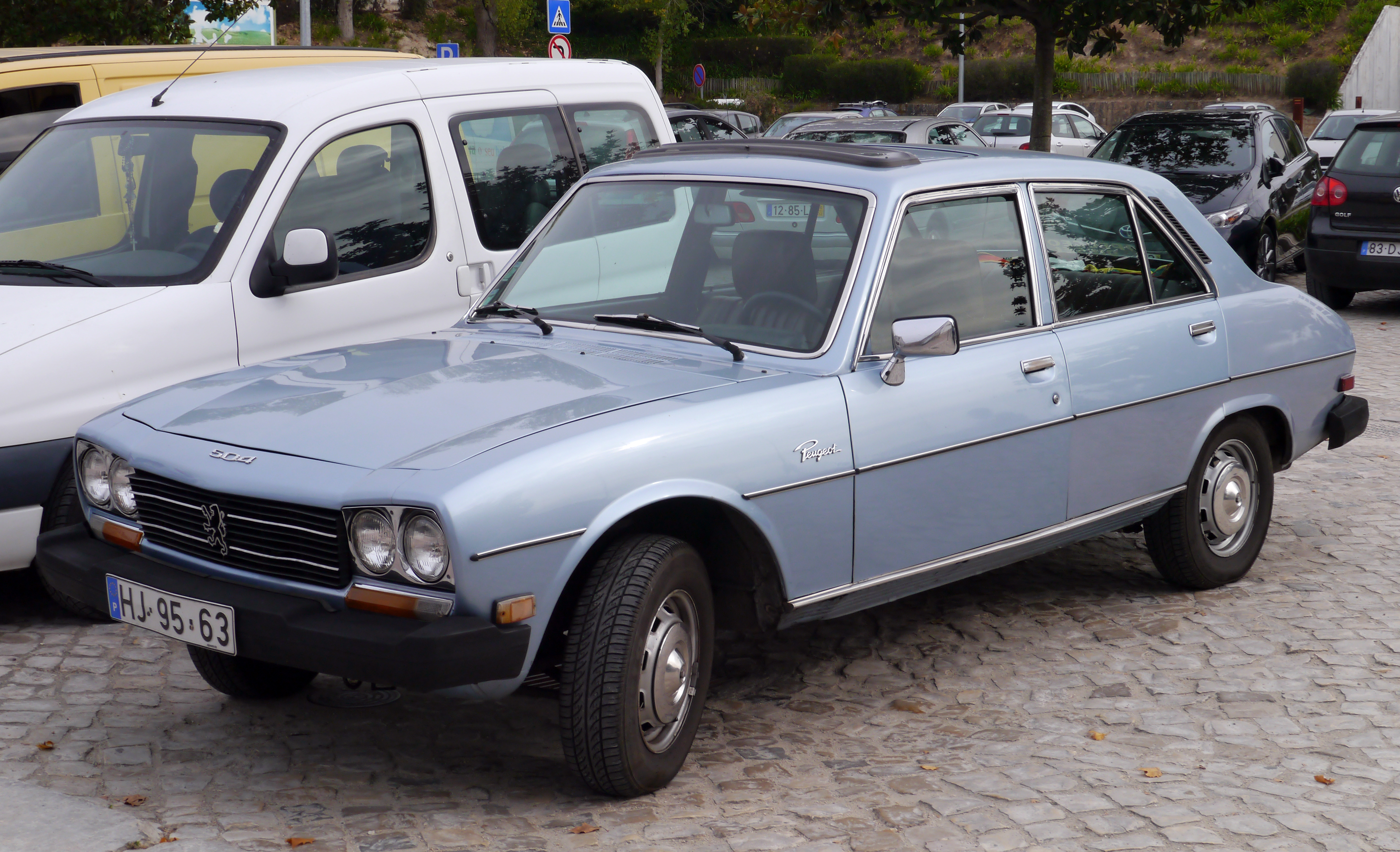
US-market Saloon with bigger bumpers, sealed-beam headlamps, and side marker lights

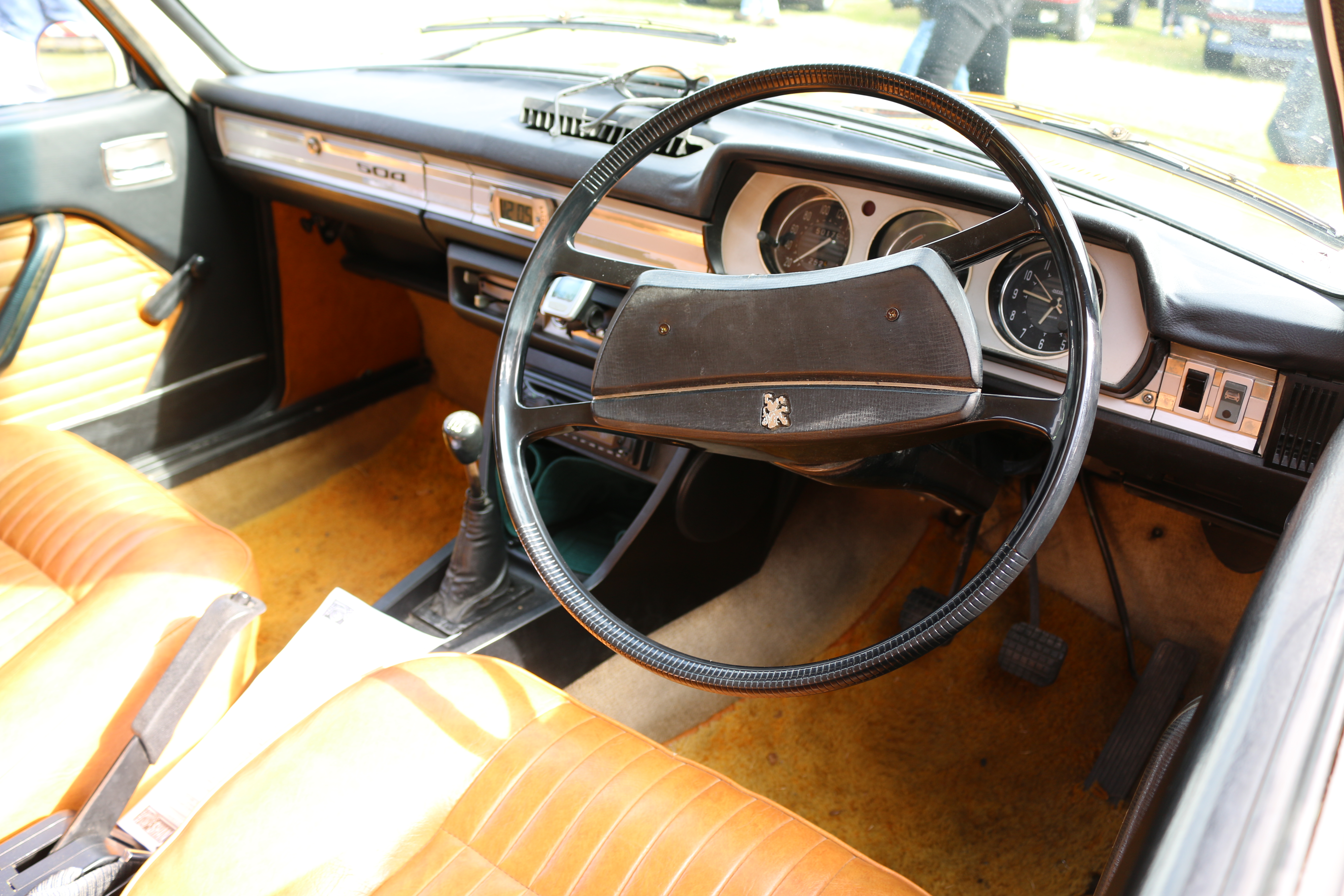
Saloon interior

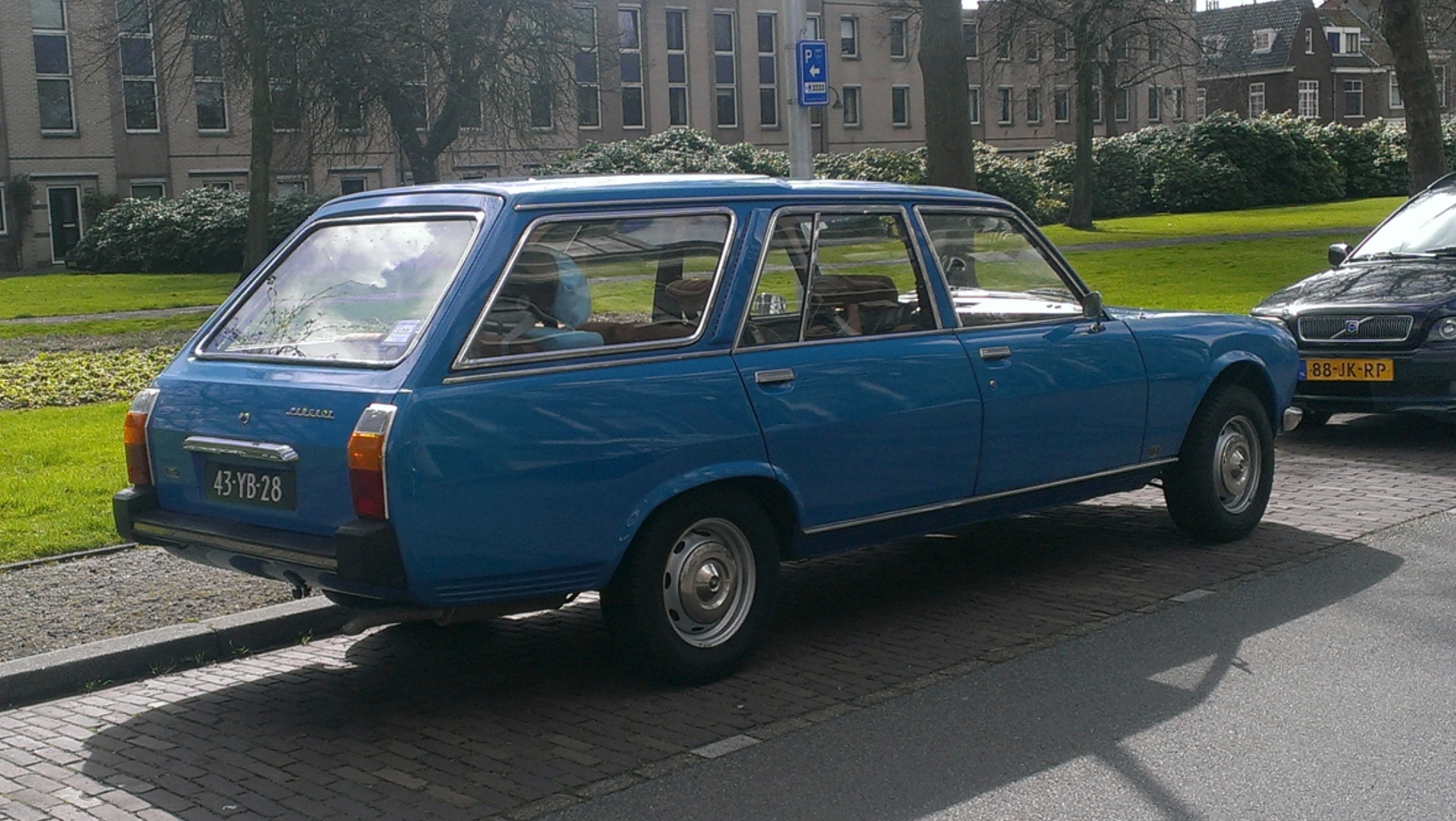
Break

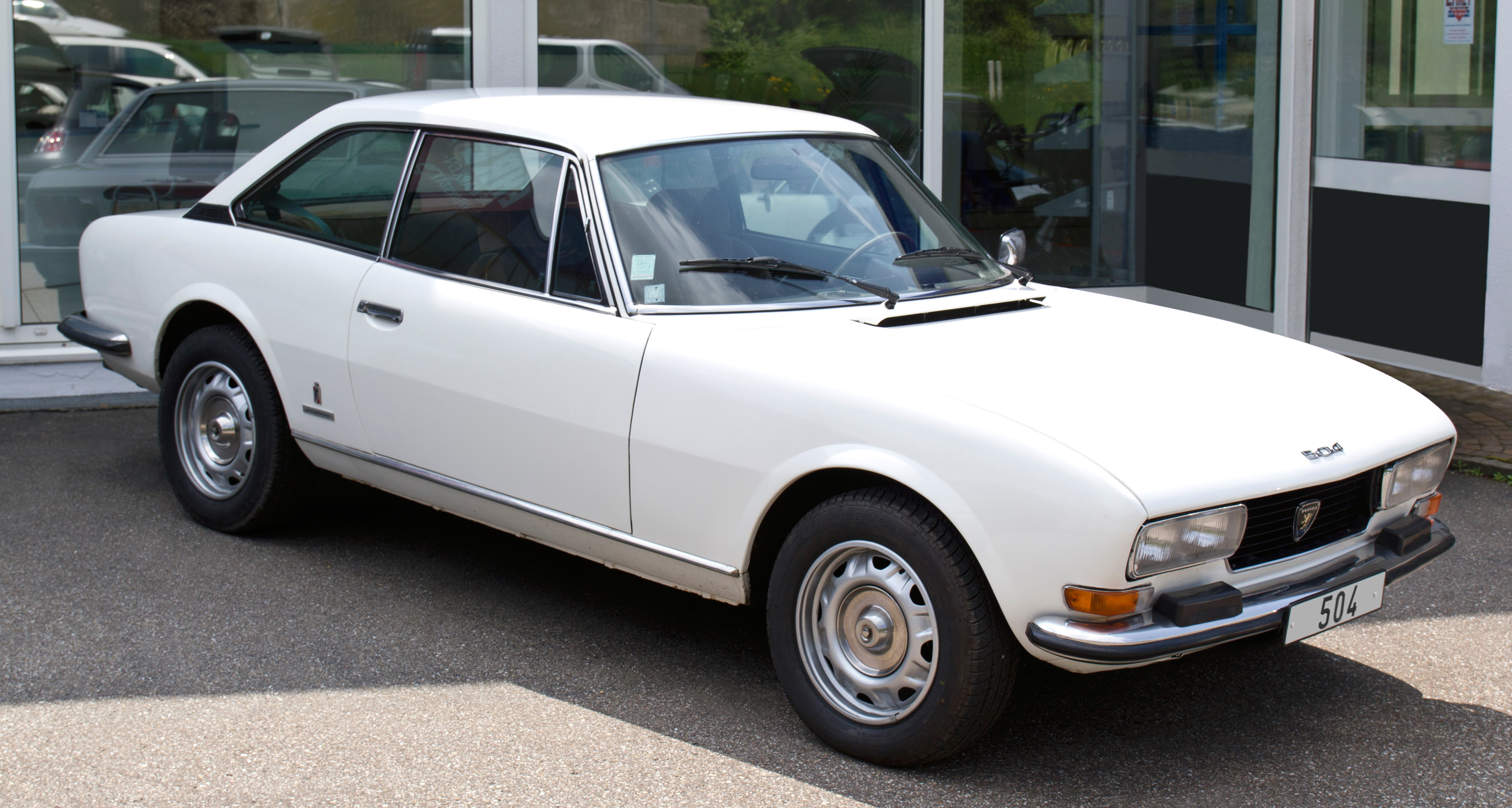
Coupé

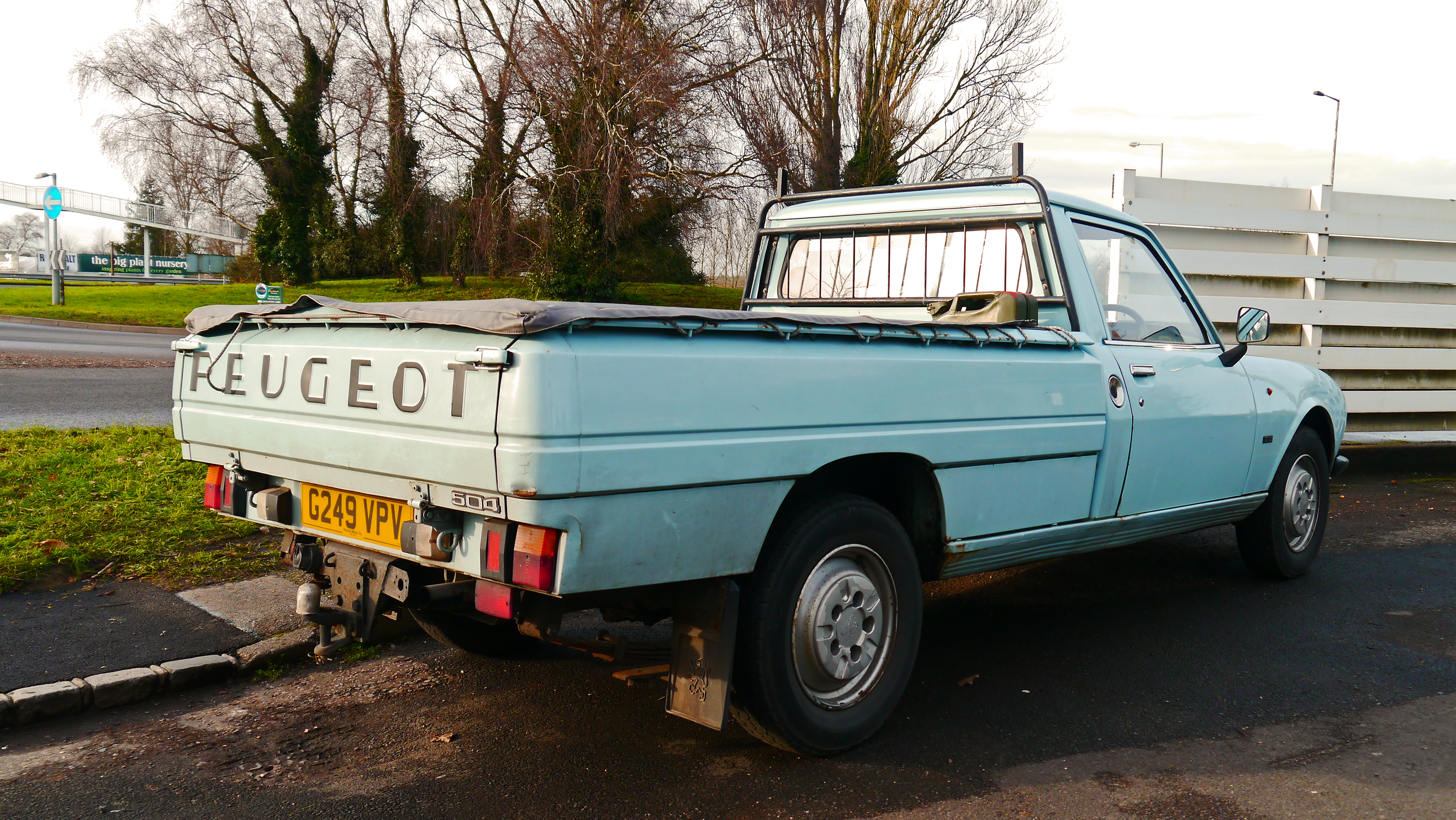
Pickup

== 504 Coupé/Cabriolet ==
As with the preceding 404, Peugeot had Pininfarina design a two-door coupé and cabriolet variant which were first introduced at the Geneva Salon in March 1969. Aside from designing them, Pininfarina also built the bodyshells. The two-door 504s have a 190 mm (7.5 in) shorter wheelbase and also a wider rear track. The shells were built in Turin and then sent to Peugeot's Sochaux plant for assembly.

Mechanically, the 504 Coupé and Cabriolet were largely identical to the saloons, sharing the 1.8-liter four (upgraded to two litres for 1970) with no additional performance enhancements. Once the 604 arrived, however, the sportier 504s finally got an engine to match their looks: the 2.7-litre V6 PRV engine, producing 136 PS (100 kW) was fitted beginning in September 1974 and the four-cylinder variants discontinued. This was also time for a facelift (2nd series), with redesigned bumpers and interior, and with single, wide headlights replacing the initial twin units. The triple taillights were also changed for wider, single units. The V6 was not a strong seller in fuel crisis Europe, however, and the 2.0 was reintroduced in October 1977, by which time about 27,000 examples had been built by Pininfarina. The V6 Cabriolet was discontinued but the V6 Coupé gained a five-speed manual transmission and Bosch K-Jetronic fuel injection, with power increased to 144 PS (106 kW).

For the 1980 model year, Peugeot again redesigned the car slightly (3rd series), with a light change to the grille and changing from the filigrane chrome pieces to fuller polyurethane bumpers. These are painted black on cars painted solid colours, while cars with metallic paint received body-coloured bumpers. In October 1981, the Coupé and Cabriolet received one final revision, with the instrument panel now containing five (rather than three) gauges. The V6 Coupé received redesigned alloy wheels on TRX tires. Production ended at the beginning of August 1983, after 31,163 examples had been built.

The first series initially came equipped only with a four-speed manual. In September 1971, a ZF three-speed automatic became an available option for both bodystyles. The Cabriolet lost this option twelve months later, after 292 examples had been built. For 1978, the V6 (now only on the Coupé) switched to a five-speed transmission, which replaced the four-speed on four-cylinder cars as well for the 1980 facelift. The V6 Coupé was also available with a three-speed automatic during the Series 2 production run.

The 504 V6 Coupé was also campaigned in the World Rally Championship, mainly on long-distance rallies. It won outright in the 1978 Safari Rally and took the top two places at the 1978 Bandama Rally. Coupés also won several non-WRC rallies, mostly in Africa, such as the 1976 Bandama Rally, the 1979 Tour du Maghreb, the 1980 and 1981 Rally Zaïre, and the 1981 Rally Kenya.

Pininfarina developed a shooting brake variant called the Peugeot 504 Riviera. First shown in September 1971, Peugeot declined to put it into production and it remained a one-off. Peugeot also had Pininfarina design a replacement for the 504 Coupé, an aerodynamic three-door coupé with a rear hatch targeting the US market and aiming for a 1982 introduction. Codenamed E27 it was called the Peugeot 504 Coupé Sport, but Peugeot's precarious finances combined with the vagaries of the US market compelled them to abandon the project.

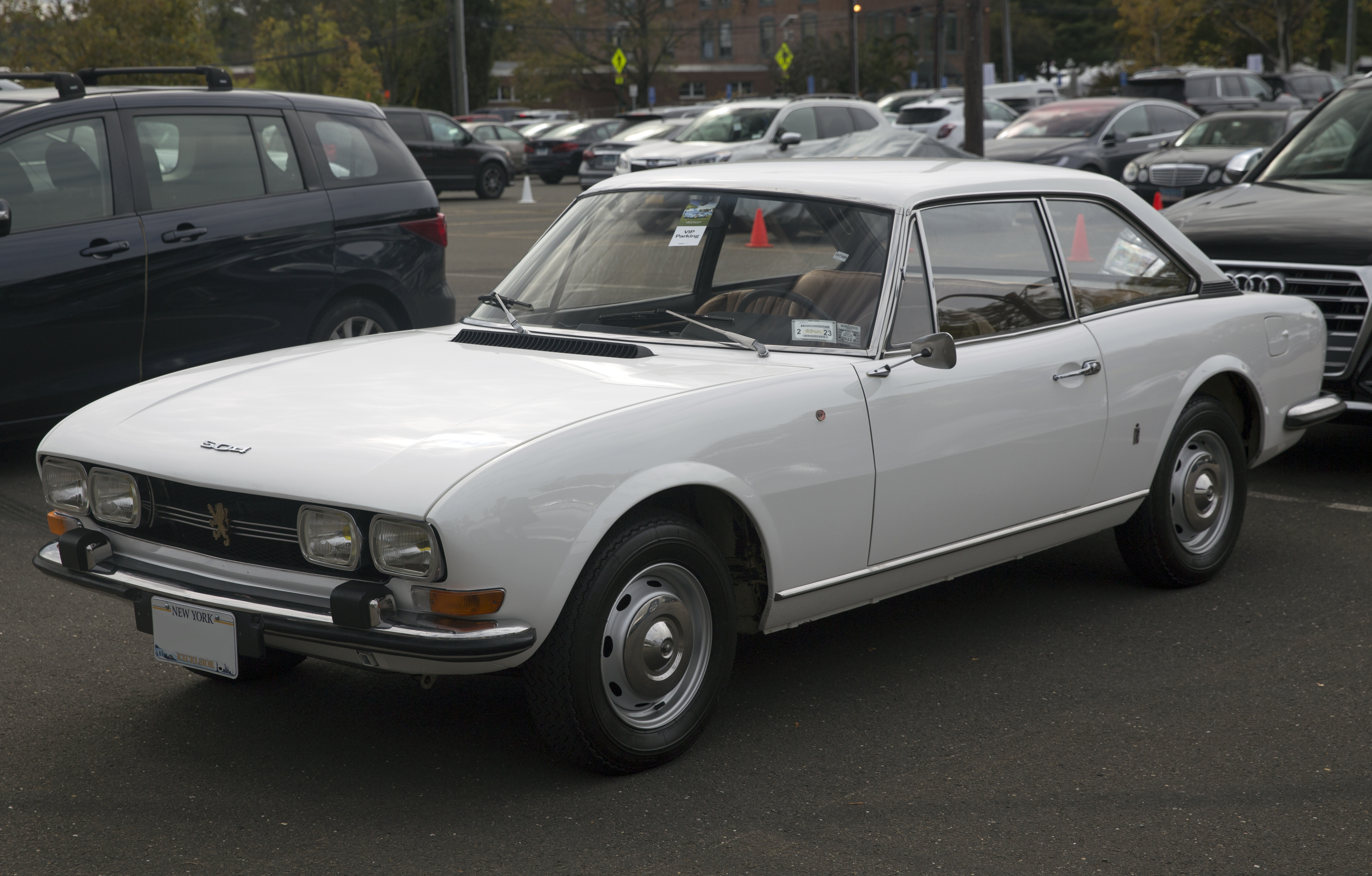
1969 504 Coupé (initial year)

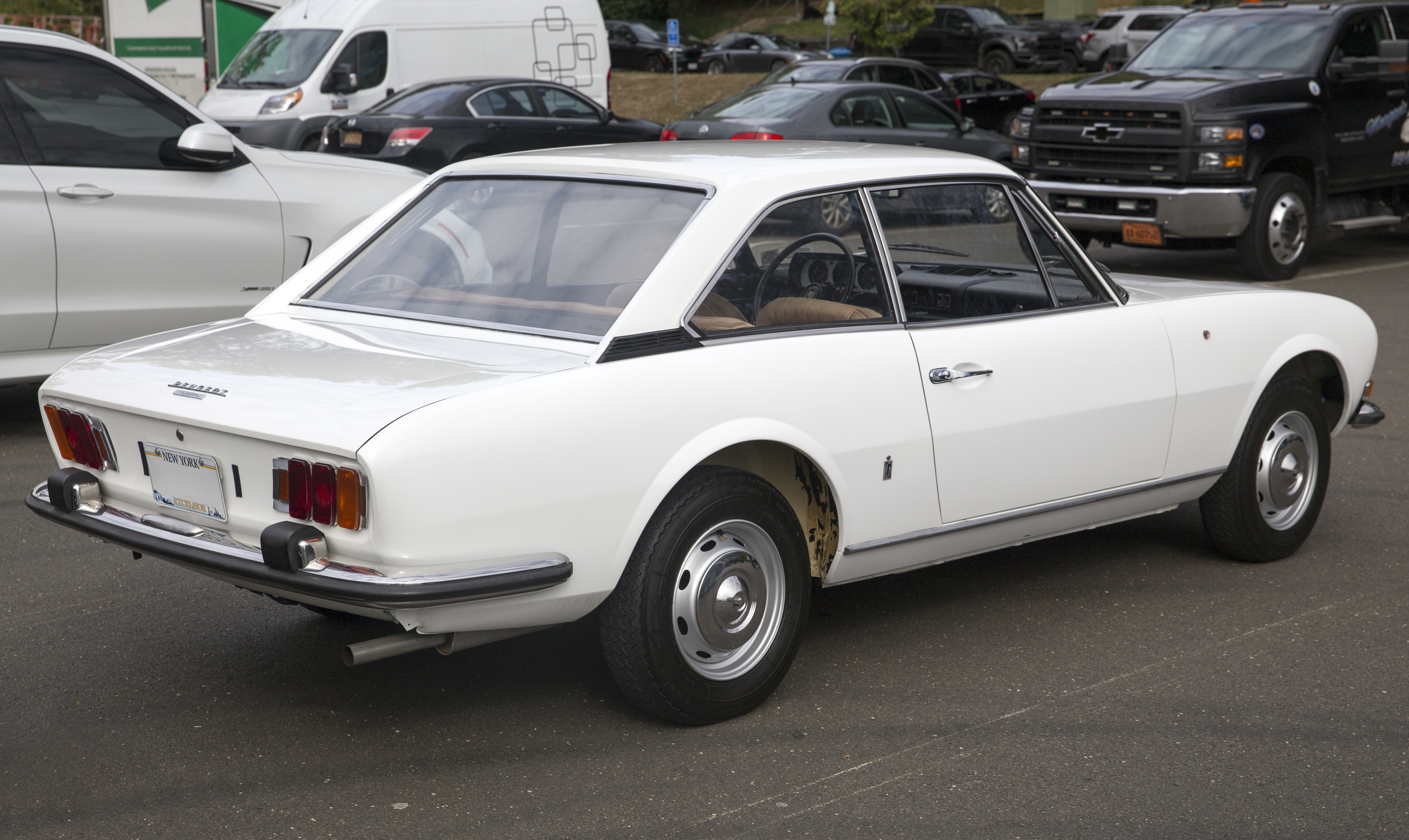
1st series Coupé; rear view

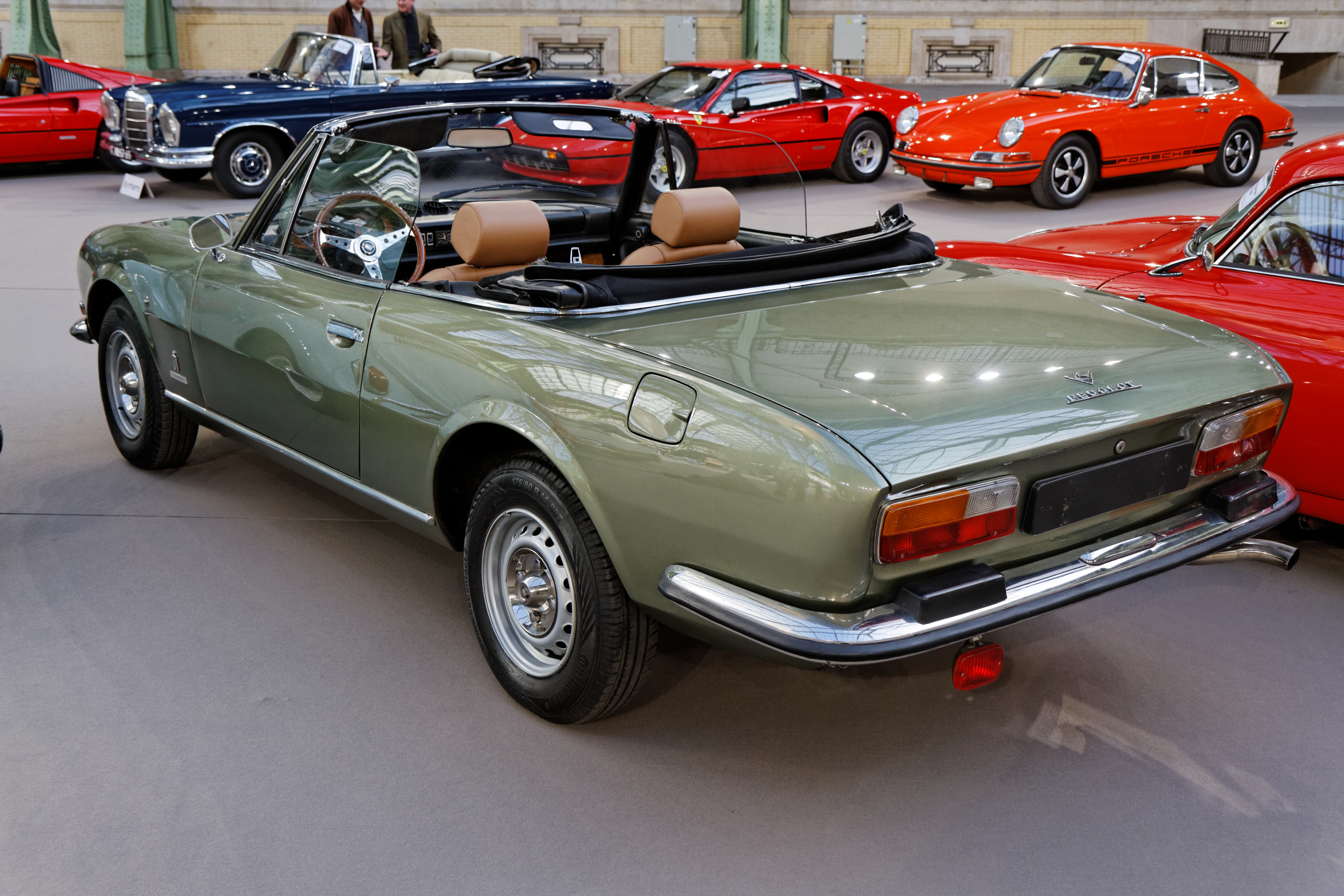
Cabriolet (2nd series; rear view)

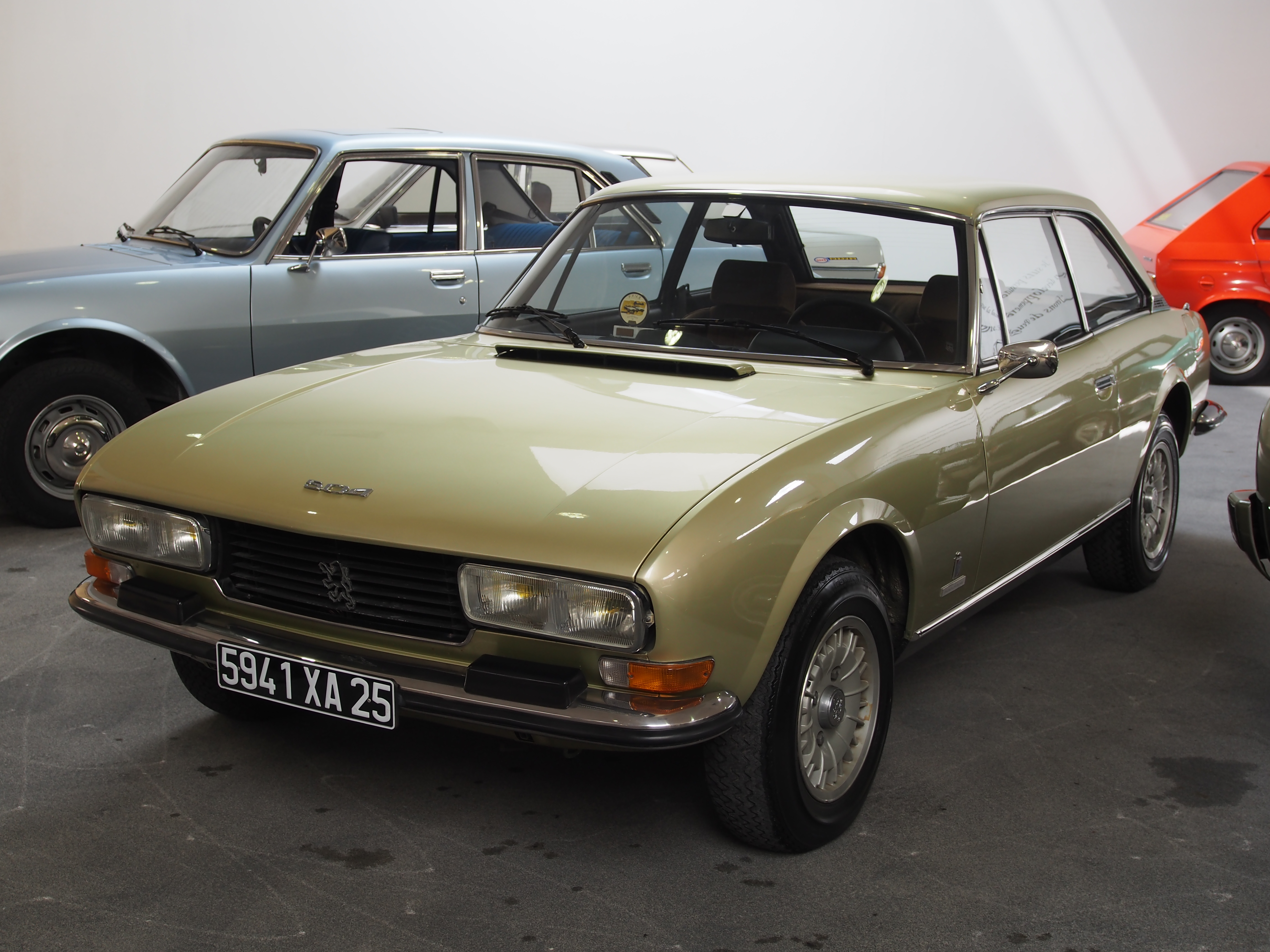
Coupé (2nd series)

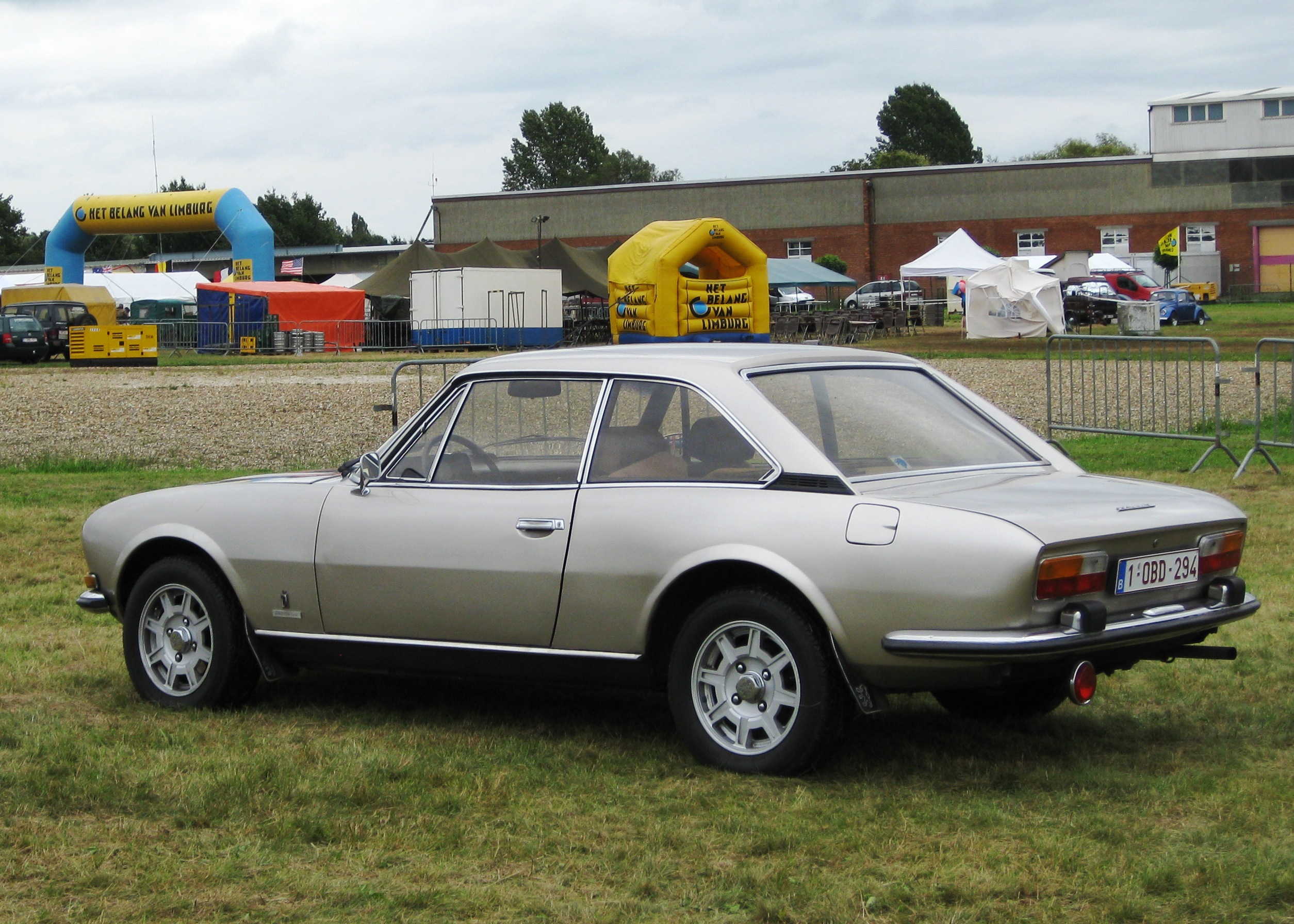
Coupé (2nd series; rear view)

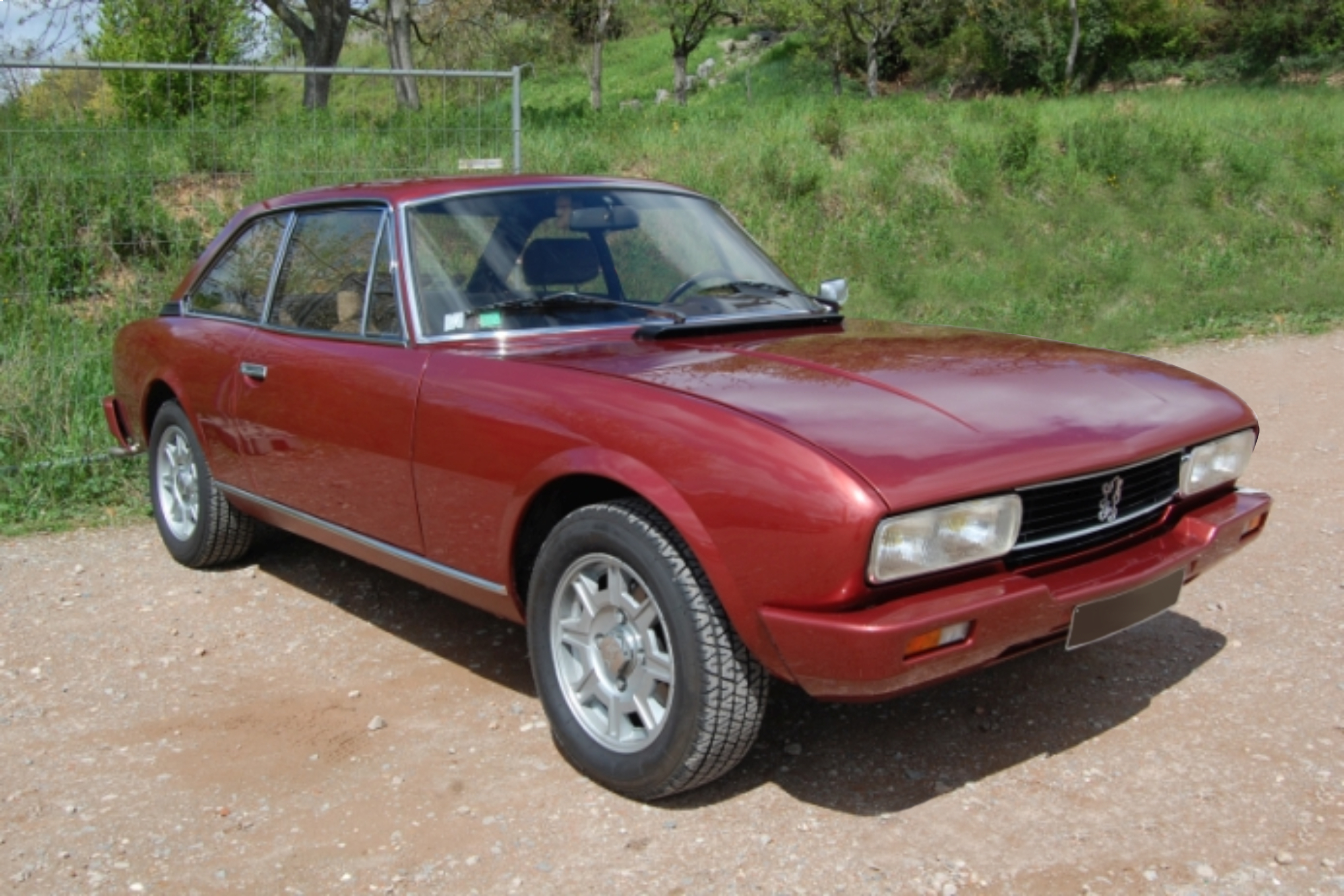
Coupé (3rd series); metallic-painted cars have body-coloured bumpers

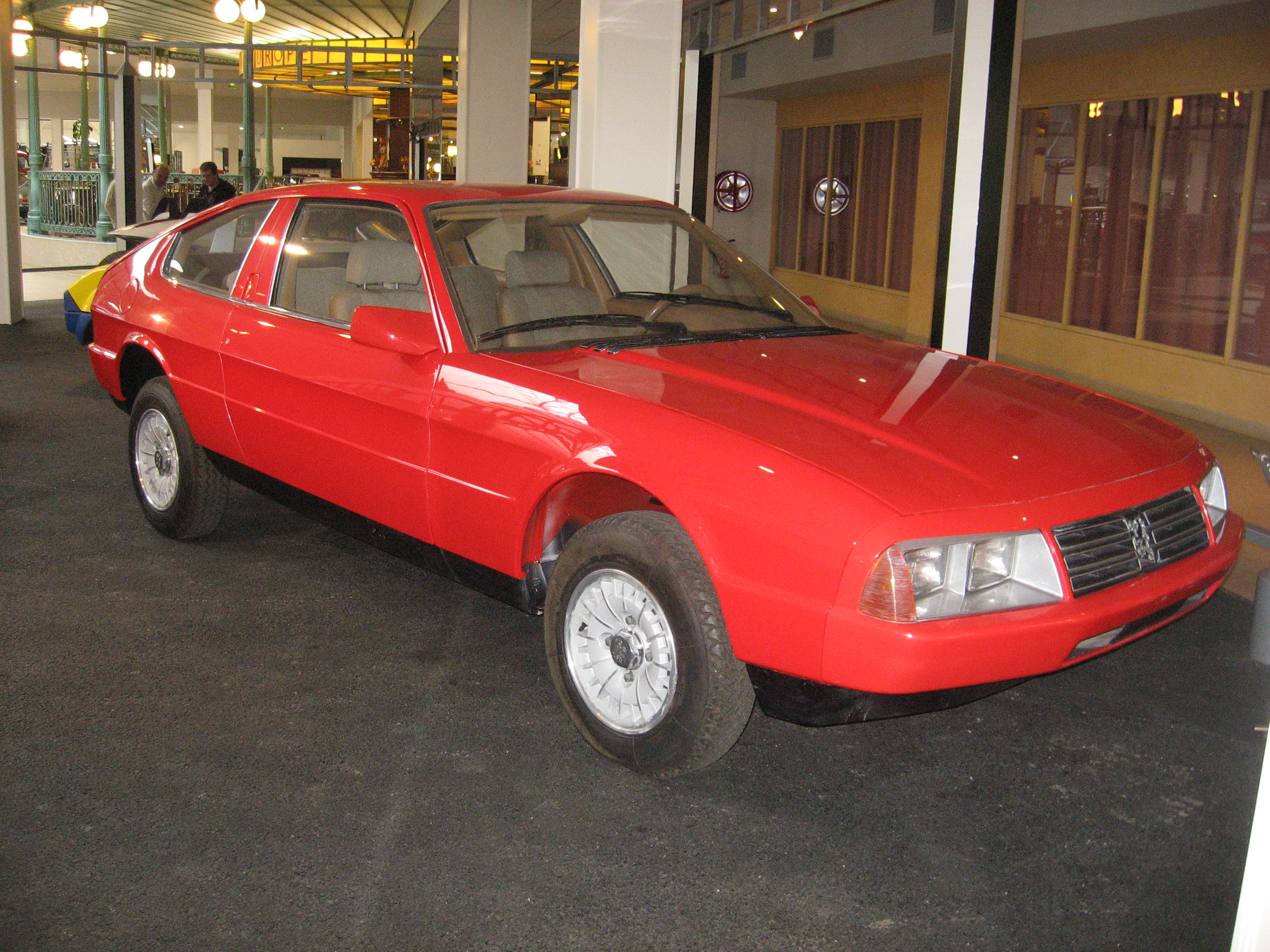
The stillborn 504 Coupé Sport (E27)

== Pickup and commercials ==
In September 1979, for the 1980 model year, the 504 Pickup was introduced. The considerable work involved in converting the 504's monocoque body into a load-carrying version had taken a full decade. The pickup used the longer wheelbase and live rear axle of the 504 Break. On introduction, it was available with very basic spec and single round headlights, fitted in plastic frames shaped like the 504's "cat's eyes." The engine options were the 404's 1618 cc petrol (U01) and 1948 cc diesel (U20); outputs are 62 and 49 PS (46 and 36 kW) respectively. This was the only 504 sold with the 1.6-litre XC5 engine. As with most of Peugeot's commercial vehicles, the 504 Pickup was assembled by Chausson. Cargo capacity was 1,100 kg (2,400 lb) for both versions; models exported to Africa were rated at 1,250 kg (2,760 lb) (V01/V20). A chassis cab model was also offered, and manufacturers such as Heuliez offered a number of different applications for the 504 chassis. Germany's Bimobil even offered a demountable camper for the 504, weighing about 450 kg (992 lb). Around 300 of these were built, following an initial order of twenty made by Peugeot themselves.

As with the regular 504, the pickup has rear-wheel-drive and a floor-shifted four-speed manual transmission. A locking differential was also standard. Late-model pickups were also available with a five-speed transmission. In July 1981, Dangel added a four-wheel-drive version of the Pickup. These were mainly purchased by French governmental agencies, as their procurement rules required them to purchase French when possible. About 5500 Dangel 4x4 Pickups were built until the model's discontinuation in 1994.

For 1982 the better equipped 504 Pickup GR was added, these received some chrome touches and luxuries such as a clock and door-mounted armrests. Externally, the GR was set apart by black rubber bumper overriders, different hubcaps and a modicum of chrome ornamentation (the standard version received a grille and bumpers painted light gray). By 1984, the chrome parts were dropped in favor of a cleaner, more modern appearance. The GR was renamed "Confort" in 1987, at least in the French domestic market. This is also when the 1.6 petrol option was discontinued. The GR received an 80 PS (59 kW) version of the 504's 1.8-liter petrol engine, while the GRD had the 70 PS (51 kW) 2.3-liter diesel. The French models were then renamed "Entrepreneur" in 1988 (by now with a 2.1 Diesel) and were upgraded to the 2.3-liter diesel for 1990. Trim levels received differing names in various markets; in Britain, most later 504 Pickups received "GL" badging. For 1995 and 1996, subsequent to the end of pickup production in France, Argentinian 504 Pickups were exported to France. These can be recognized by the large modernized front bumper and redesigned dashboard.

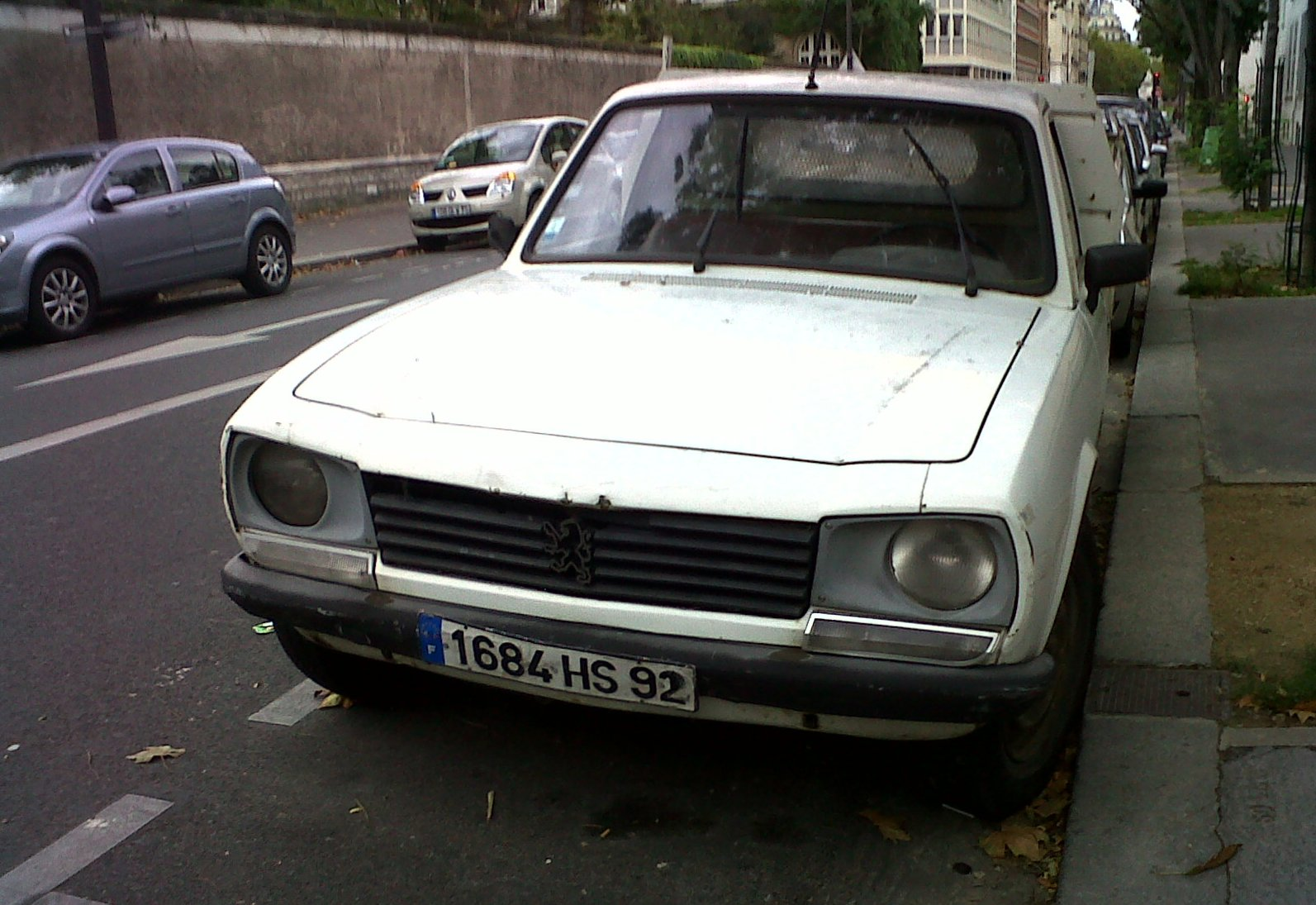
The 504 Pickup Commerciale front, with single round headlights

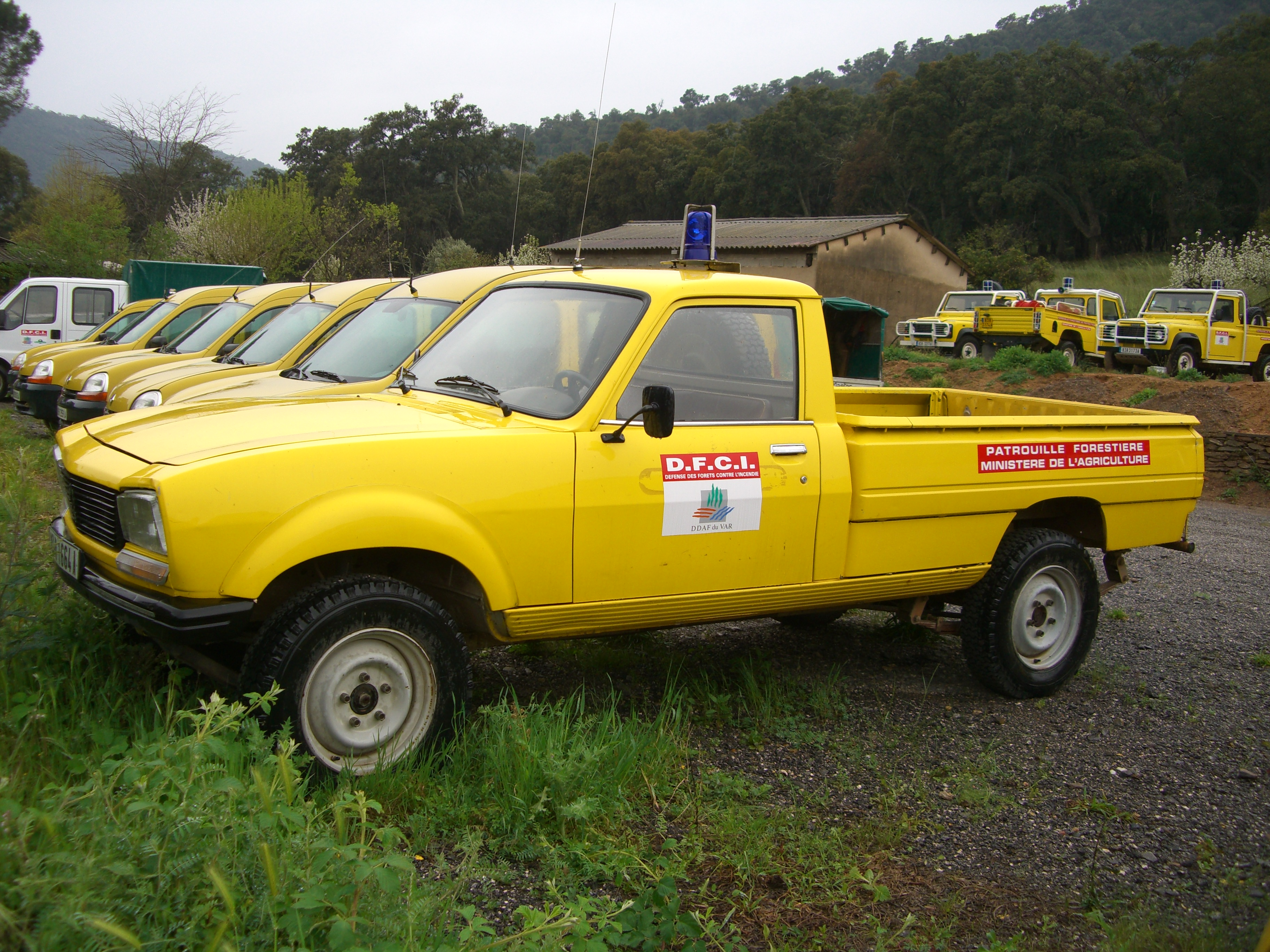
Dangel Peugeot 504 4x4 Pickup belonging to the French forest fire service

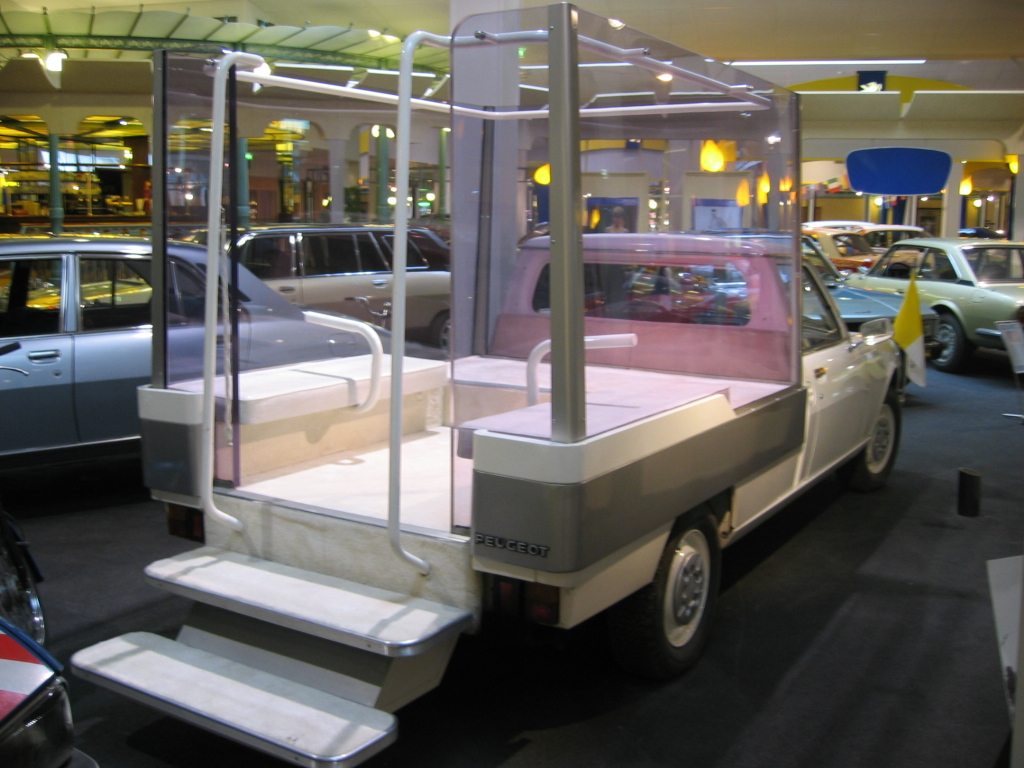
A 504 Pickup used as popemobile

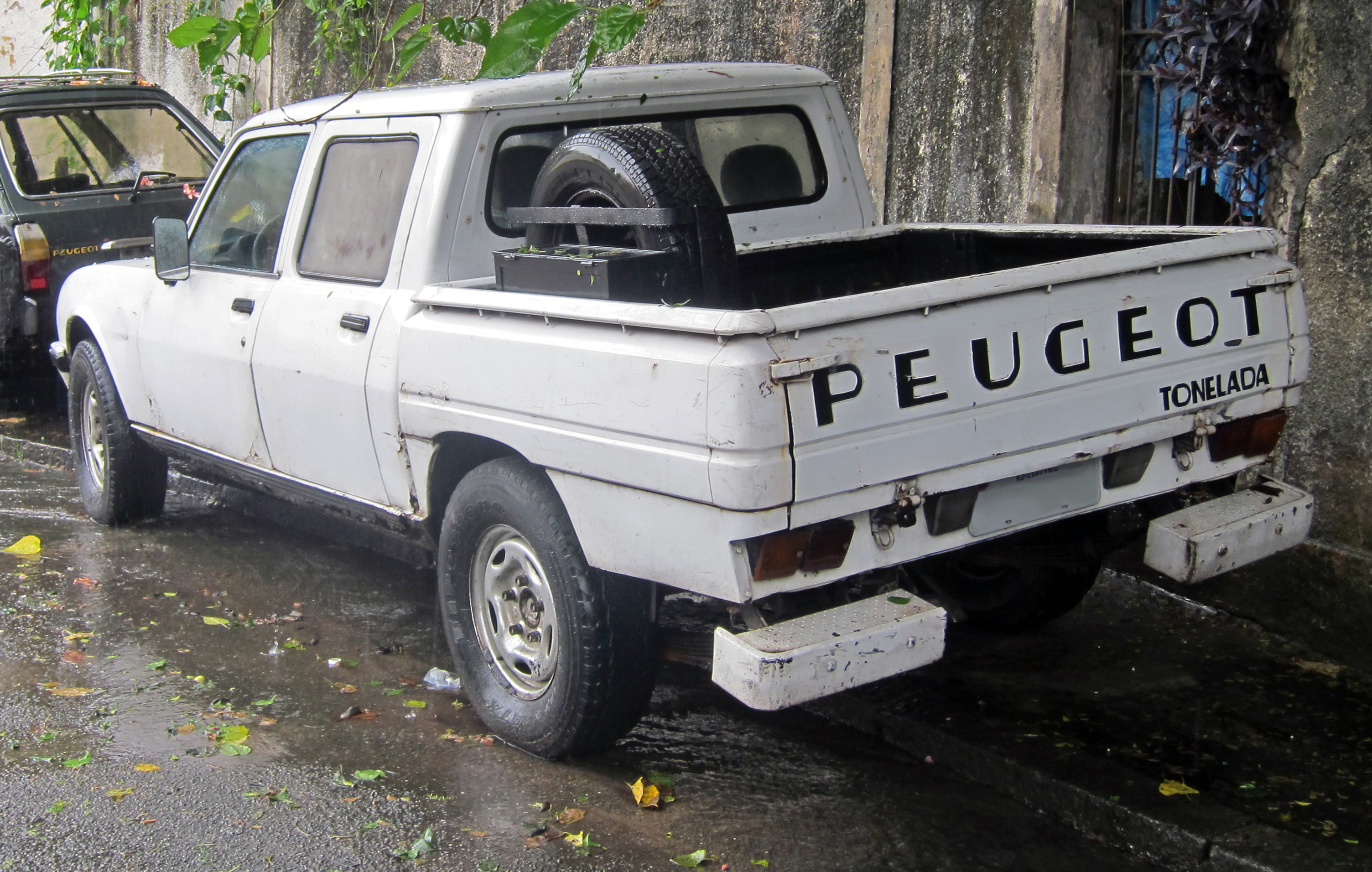
Argentinian-built 504 Double-Cab Pickup

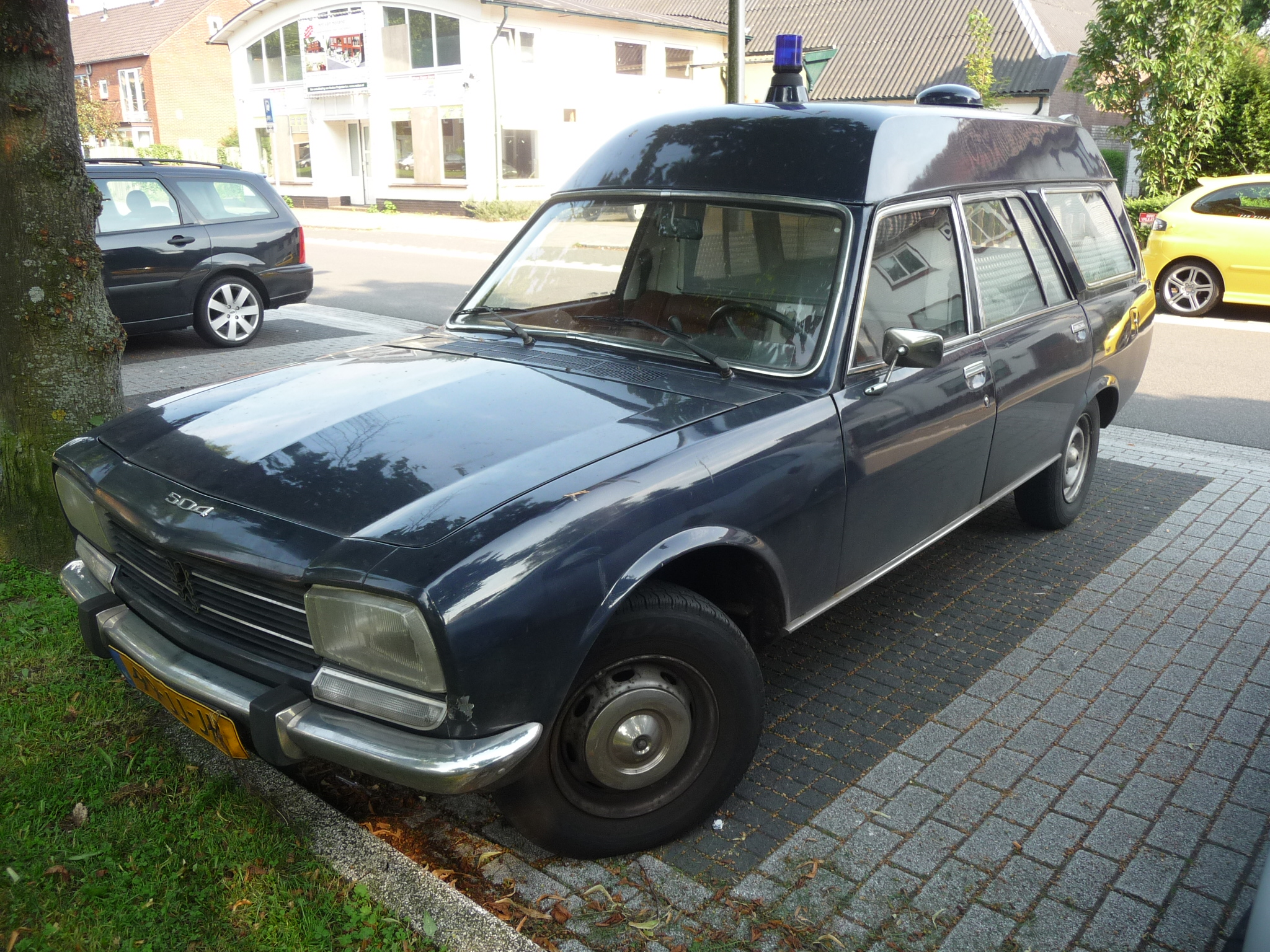
The 504 Ambulance used the same heavy-duty rear suspension as the pickup versions

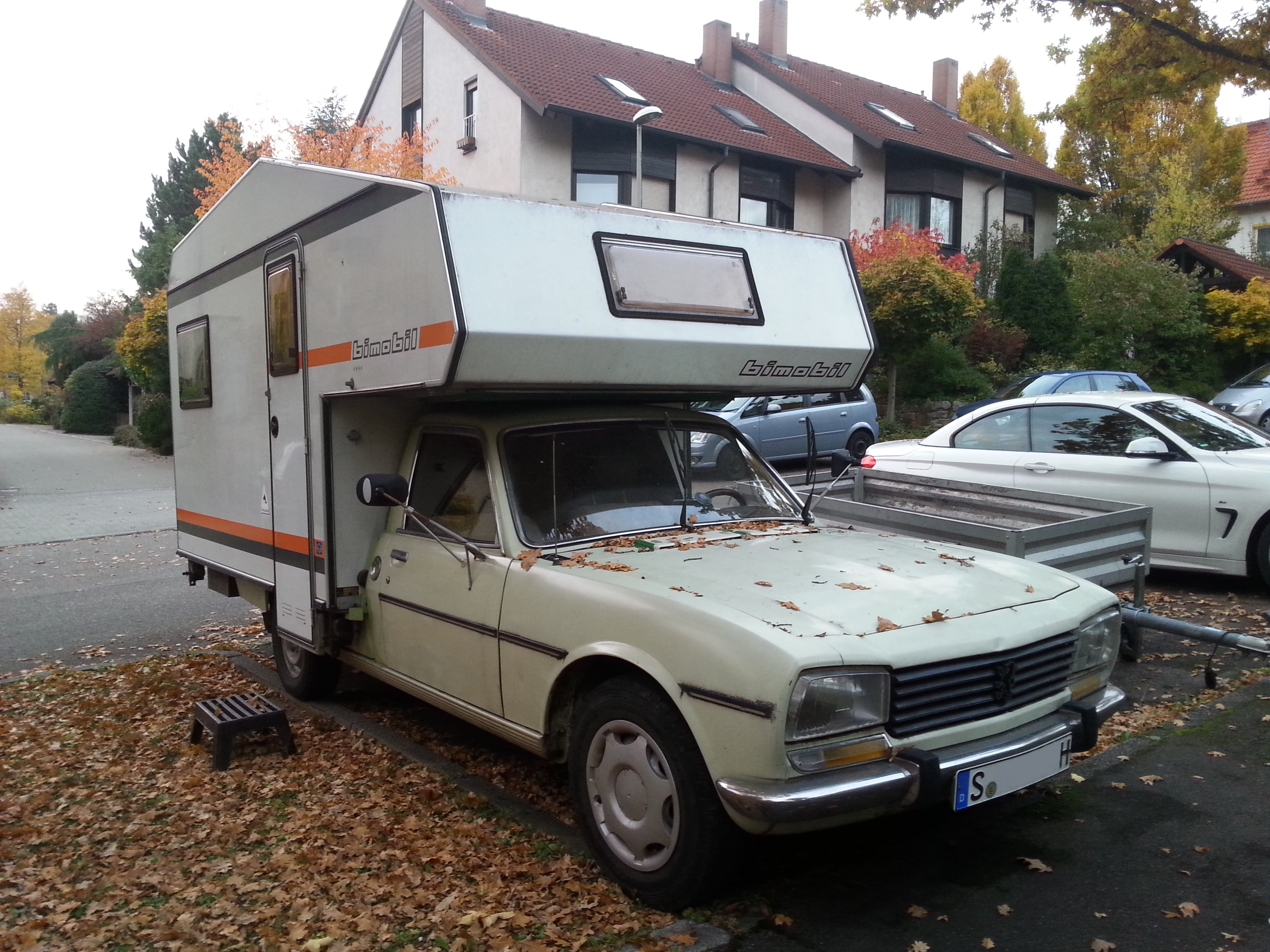
A Peugeot 504 Pickup-based RV

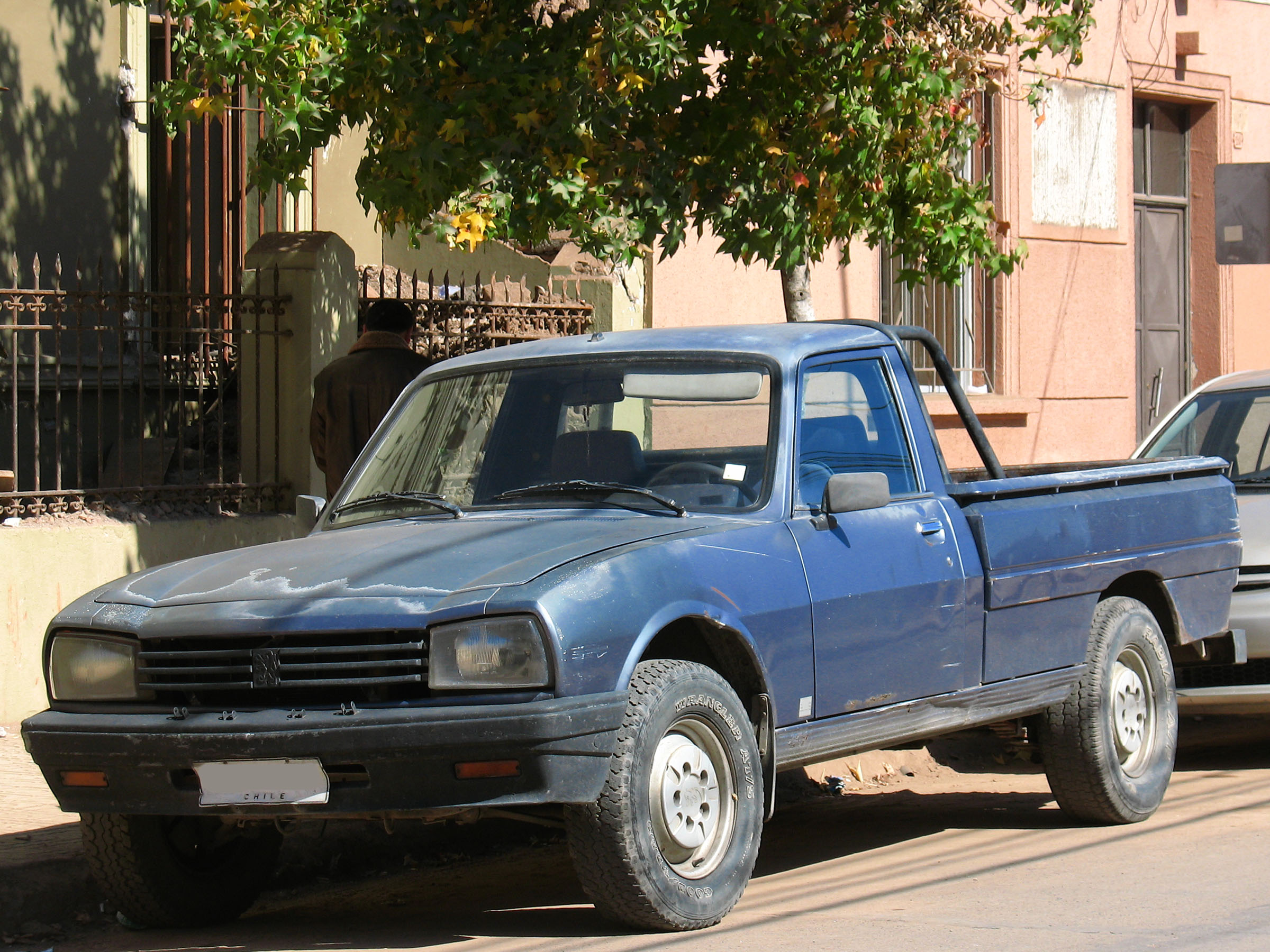
Chilean 504 Single-Cab Pickup.

== Mechanical configuration ==
The car was rear-wheel drive, with longitudinally mounted engines, canted over to bring a lower bonnet line to the styling. Manual and automatic transmissions were offered. The suspension system consisted of MacPherson struts at the front and mainly coil springs at the rear. Sedan, coupé, and cabriolet models additionally had rear semi-trailing arms whereas wagons and pickups had a simpler live rear axle with coils or heavy-duty leaf springs respectively. Most 504 models used a torque tube driveline. With long suspension travel and great strength, the 504 was suited to rough road conditions, and the car proved extremely reliable in conditions found in Africa, Asia, Australia and the like.

The car used disc brakes at the front, and either disc brakes or (in later added simpler models) drum brakes at the rear. Brake pad wear warning via an instrument panel indicator light was a notable innovation. The steering was a rack and pinion system. The Peugeot 504 was widely available with diesel engines and an automatic transmission option, which was a rare combination at the time. Engines were of the Indenor design and included 1948 cc, 2112 cc, and a 2304 cc. The Indenor engine was also used in dozens of other automobiles and light commercials as well as for marine applications.

There were three petrol engines available in Europe, 1796 cc and 1971 cc four cylinder and a 2664 cc V6. The two-litre engine was also available with Kugelfischer mechanical fuel injection, first available on the earlier Peugeot 404. Gearboxes were either the BA7, four-speed manual or ZF three-speed automatic. Later pickup trucks in Europe gained a fifth gear. Export market vehicles had different variations available. The 504's engines and suspension were adapted on later models of the Paykan, the Iranian version of the Hillman Hunter.

== Markets ==
As of December 2015, 197 examples of the Peugeot 504 are still in use in Britain.

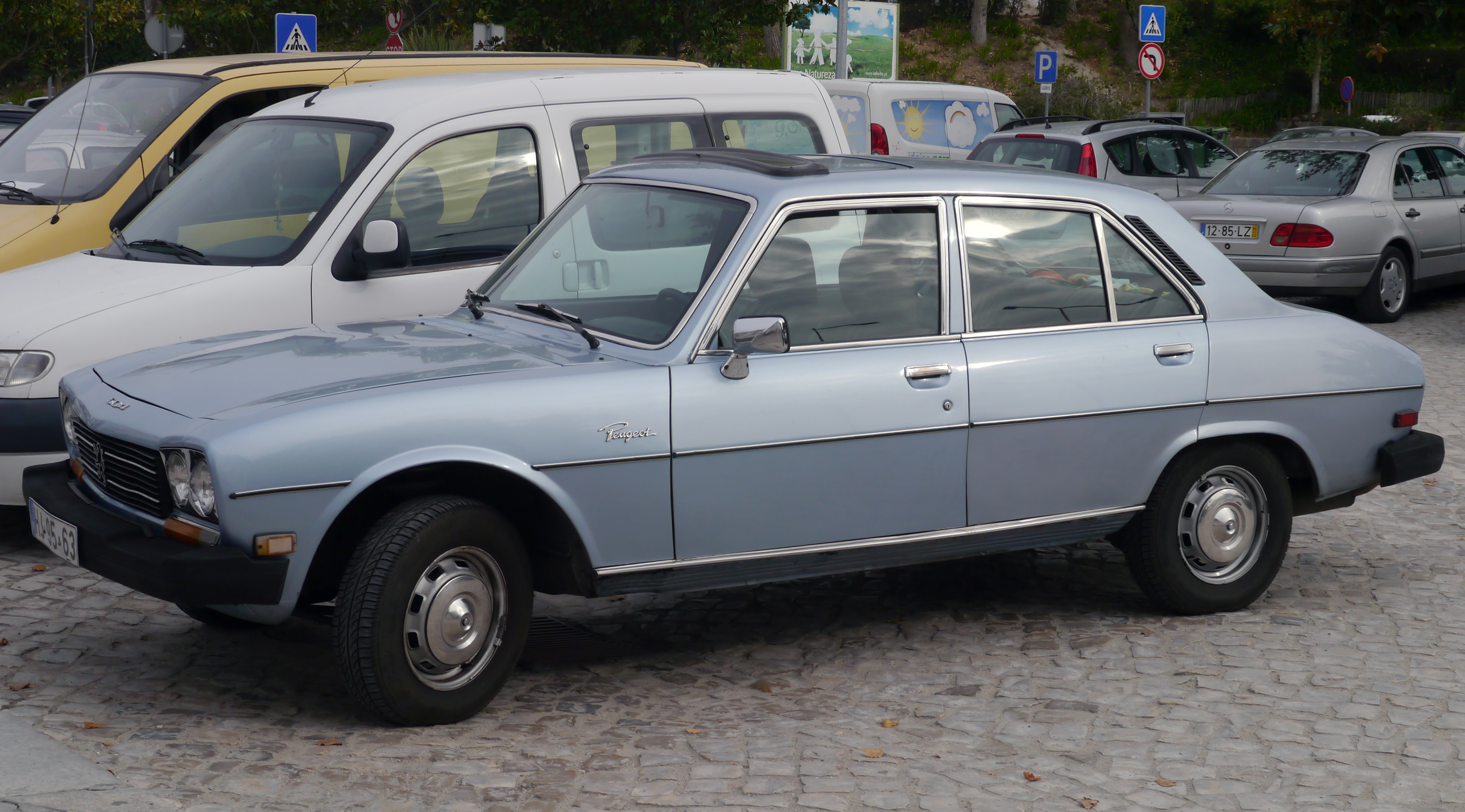
1979 Peugeot 504 Diesel (US); note sealed-beam headlamps, larger bumpers, and side marker lights

United States

For several years, the 504 was Peugeot's only model offered in North America. Originally very similar to European specified models, the 504 had to be gradually modified to meet the federal emissions and safety standards. The 2-litre petrol engine was offered alongside the 2.1 diesel, later replaced by the 2.3.

In 1974, the US-spec carburetted 2-litre engine produced 82 hp (61 kW; 83 PS) at 5200 rpm with a low 7.6:1 compression ratio. The 2.1 diesel was unchanged vis-à-vis the global model, producing 62 hp (46 kW; 63 PS) at 4500 rpm.

== Post-European production ==
=== Africa ===
Manufacturing continued in Kenya until 2004, and Nigeria until 2006, using the Peugeot knock down kits, which meant that versions of the 504 had been in production in various parts of the world for a total of 38 years. Kenyan production was 27,000 units and the car remained on sale to 2007, being described as "King of the African road". Egypt also had its own production facilities. In South Africa it was built by PACSA (Peugeot and Citroën South Africa) alongside the 404 until late 1978. Sigma Motor Corporation took over from PACSA in early 1979 and moved 504 production to their "Sigma Park" plant east of Pretoria. South Africa received the two-litre and TI versions until mid-1976 when the lower priced 1800 L version was added. The L had a matte black grille and window surrounds, and did not receive bumper overriders. A similarly equipped L Wagon had arrived earlier in the year, to replace the discontinued 404 Wagon. The Peugeot 504 is also one of the most common vehicles employed as a bush taxi in Africa.

=== Asia-Pacific ===
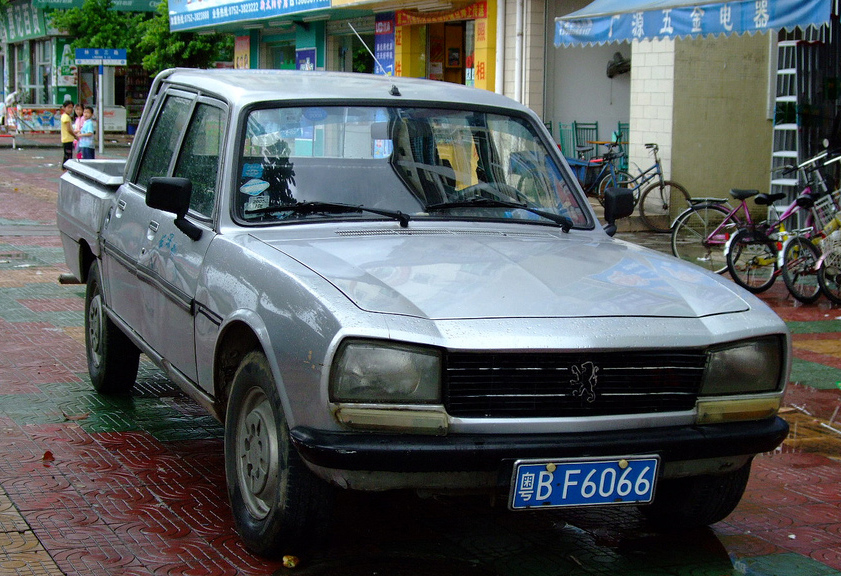
Peugeot 504 truck (China)

The car was assembled in various countries, under license from Peugeot. In Australia it was first released in 1969 and was assembled by Peugeot's rival Renault, and sold through Renault Australia's dealer network. In 1981 the 504 GL retailed for AUD $11,000. Only the saloon was assembled in Australia, while the Break and Familiale models were imported fully built-up from France.

In China, the 504 was produced in pickup form, with a four-door crew cab, a live rear axle, on an extended estate platform. These were built by Guangzhou Peugeot Automobile Company. Chinese production of the 504 pickup ceased in 1997, when the joint venture folded.

=== South America ===
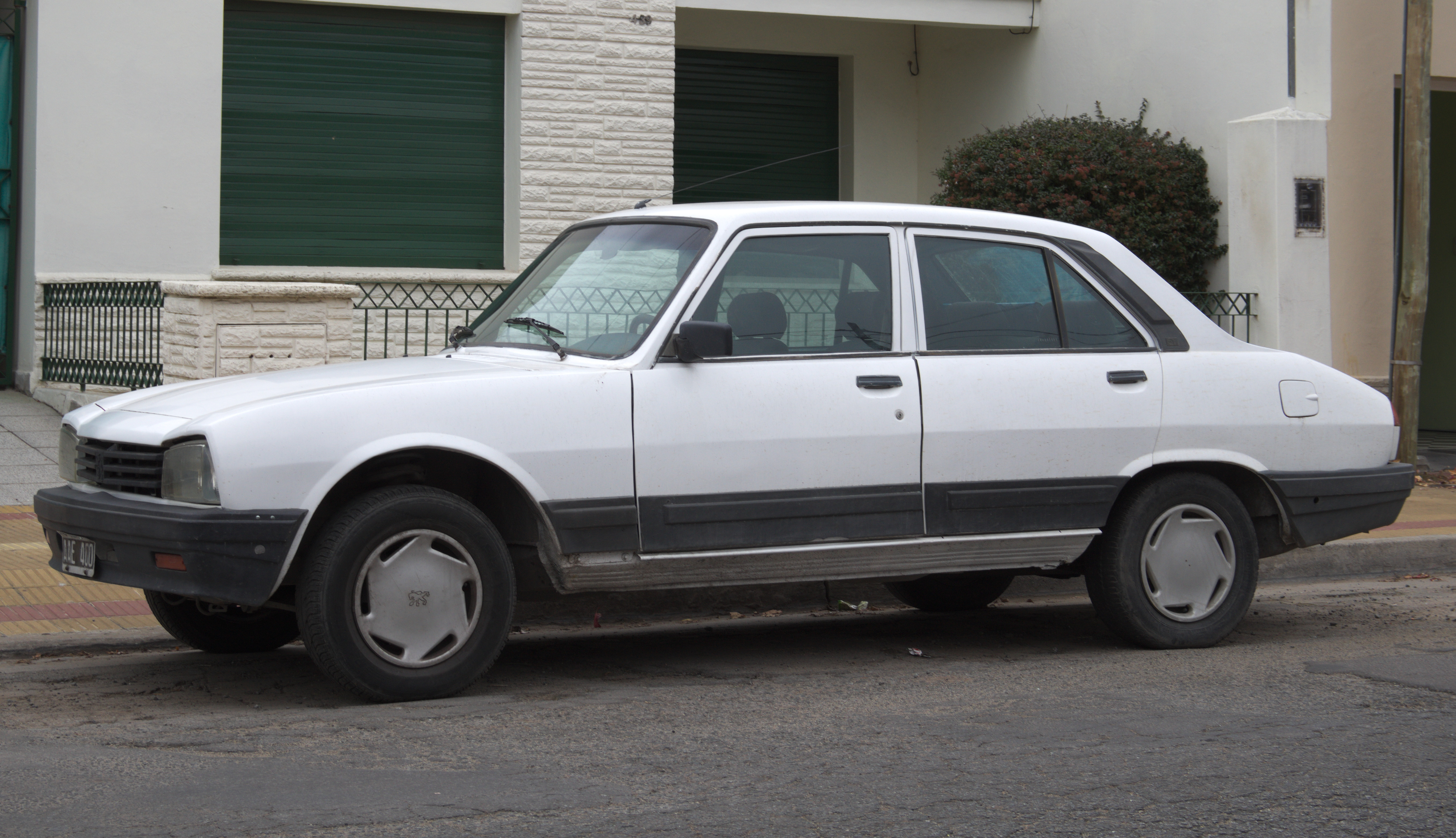
Redesigned Argentinian version of the 504 (1993-1999).

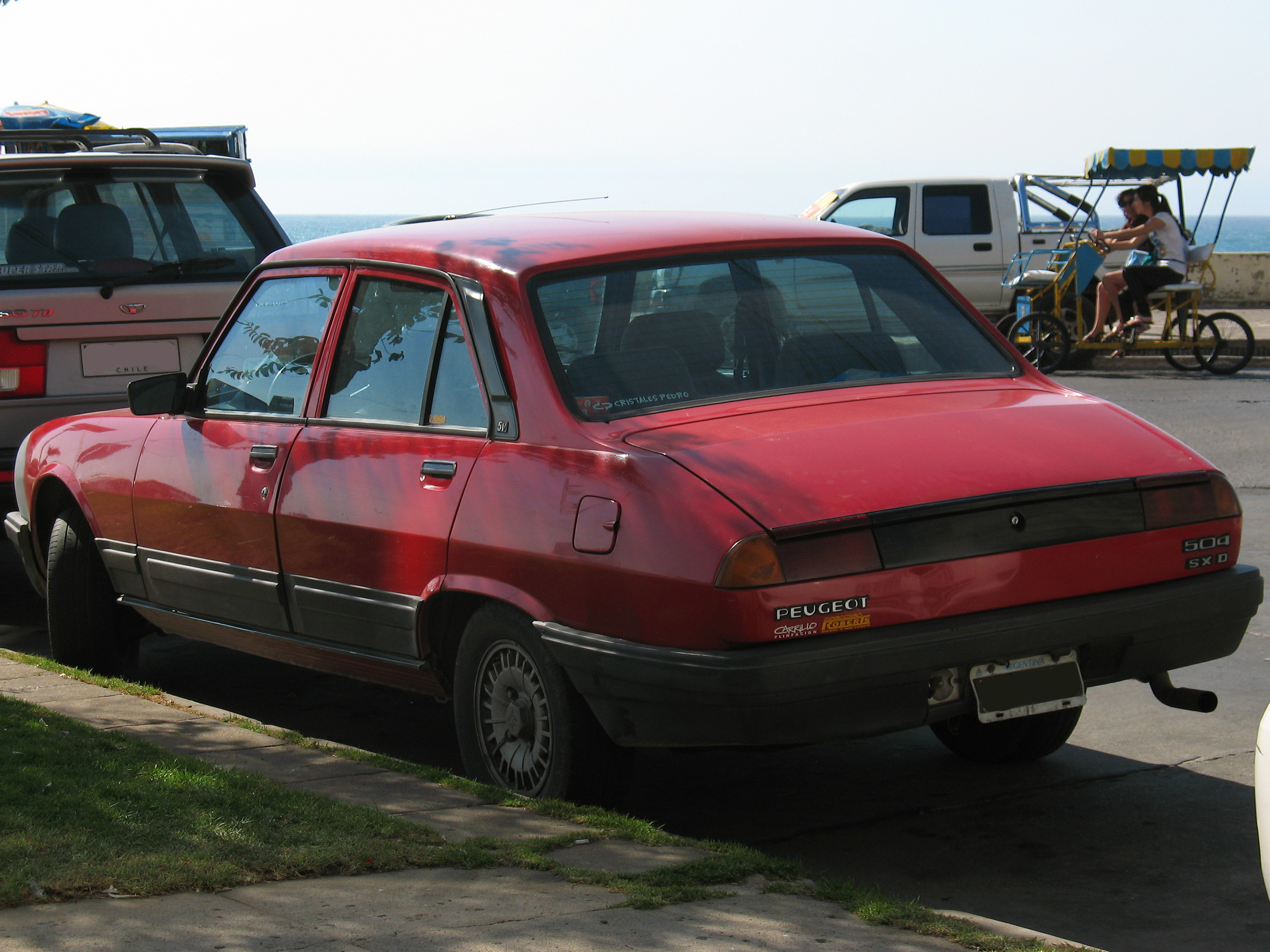
1995 Peugeot 504 SX 2.3 (rear view).

The Peugeot 504 was also produced by SAFRAR in Argentina, beginning in 1969. In 1980 Sevel Argentina took over production in El Palomar near Buenos Aires, in sedan, estate (1980 and 1981 only), and pickup forms. The sedan was built until 1999, with the last new cars sold in 2000. The pickup was manufactured in single and double cab with payload of over 1 tonne (1300 kg ) from 1983 to 1997, and exported mainly to bordering countries. In 1991 the later models were restyled at the front and rear, with the lamps and bumpers changing design. These cars were also given a new interior. Argentinian 504s offered the 1971 cc petrol four-cylinder or the 2304 cc diesel.

SAFRAR also produced a sports version of the sedan called 504 TN between 1977 and 1978; this was intended to suit local competition classes like Turismo Nacional, hence the name of the version. This version had a XN1 2.0-litre engine but with a new intake and exhaust manifold with four individual outlets, a double-mouth Solex carburetor and a camshaft with greater elevation (7.5 mm against 6.7 mm of the previous one) among other changes with the engine reaching 81 kW (110 PS; 108 hp).

=== Dangel models ===
The French company Dangel also produced Peugeot approved four-wheel drive Break (estate/station wagon) and pickup models.

== Politics ==
In 1976, the Government of Sri Lanka purchased a large number of Peugeot 504s for use of dignitaries attending the Fifth Non-Aligned Movement summit in Colombo.

In November 2010, Iranian state television announced Iranian President Mahmoud Ahmadinejad was to auction off his 1977 Peugeot 504 to raise money for charity. The car is white with a sky-blue interior, and has covered only 37,000 km since new. The political significance of the car being a 504 is that it was used as a working-class status symbol to draw electoral support from the less well-off during the 2005 presidential campaign. The money earned from the sale at international auction was to be donated to the Mehr housing project, a network of cooperatives that provides affordable housing for low-income families. Soon after being put on auction in January 2011, a bid of $1 million was received from "an Arab country". When the auction closed in March 2011, the final bid was $2.5 million.

== Motorsport ==
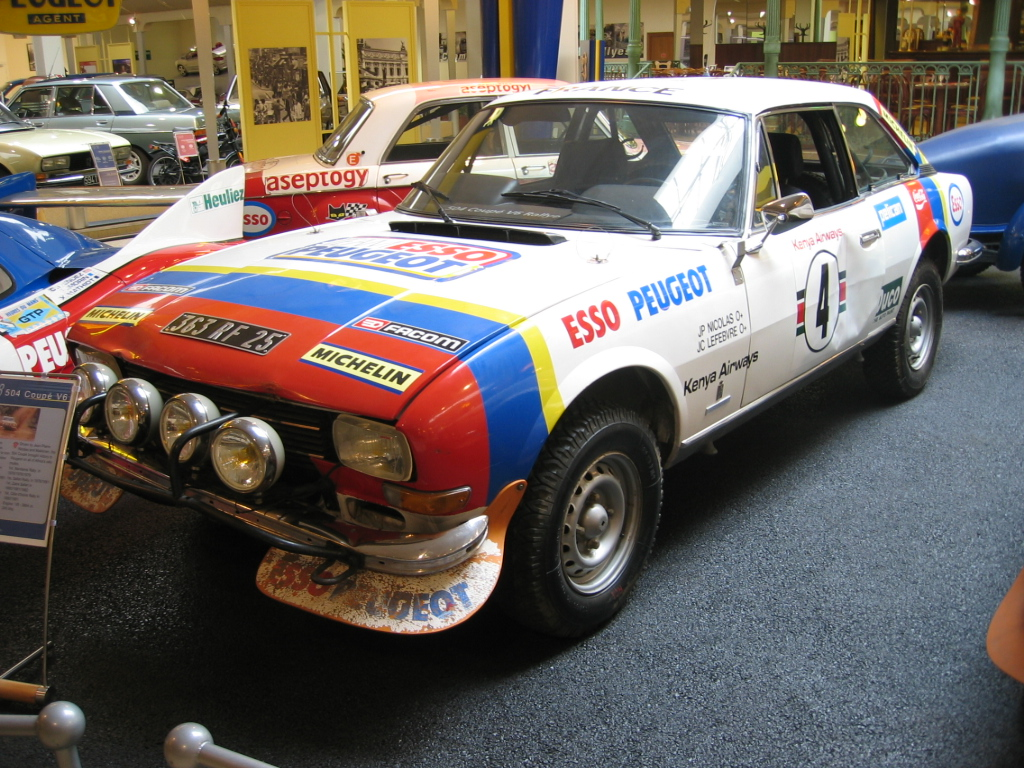
Jean-Pierre Nicolas and Jean-Claude Lefèbvre won the 26th Safari Rally driving a Peugeot 504 V6 Coupé

Peugeot 504s won the following World Rally Championship events:

Event	Season	Driver	Co-driver	Car
(Kenya) 23rd Safari Rally	1975	(Sweden) Ove Andersson	(Sweden) Arne Hertz	Peugeot 504
(Morocco) 18ème Rallye du Maroc	1975	(Finland) Hannu Mikkola	(France) Jean Todt	Peugeot 504
(Morocco) 19ème Rallye du Maroc	1976	(France) Jean-Pierre Nicolas	(France) Michel Gamet	Peugeot 504
(Kenya) 26th Safari Rally	1978	(France) Jean-Pierre Nicolas	(France) Jean-Claude Lefèbvre	Peugeot 504 V6 Coupé
(Ivory Coast) 10ème Rallye Bandama Côte d'Ivoire	1978	(France) Jean-Pierre Nicolas	(France) Michel Gamet	Peugeot 504 V6 Coupé
