= Guangzhou Peugeot Automobile Company =

Chinese automobile manufacturer

- Traded as: GAC Peugeot
- Industry: Automotive
- Founded: 1985
- Defunct: 1997
- Fate: Merged into GAC Honda in 1997
- Headquarters: Guangzhou, Guangdong, China
- Products: Automobiles

The Guangzhou Peugeot Automobile Company (GPAC) is a former automobile manufacturer located in Guangzhou, China. It was a joint venture between the Guangzhou municipal government and the Peugeot brand of the French automobile manufacturer PSA Peugeot Citroën.

The company was founded on 26 September 1985 and was defunct by March 1997 when Peugeot sold their stake in the joint venture.

Citroën, a sister brand in PSA Peugeot Citroën, already had a successful joint venture which began production in 1992 (Dongfeng-Citroën). In 2002, the Peugeot brand was reintroduced to China through Dongfeng.

After the company had gone defunct, Honda joined with the Guangzhou government to establish its own joint venture company, Guangqi Honda Automobile.

== History ==
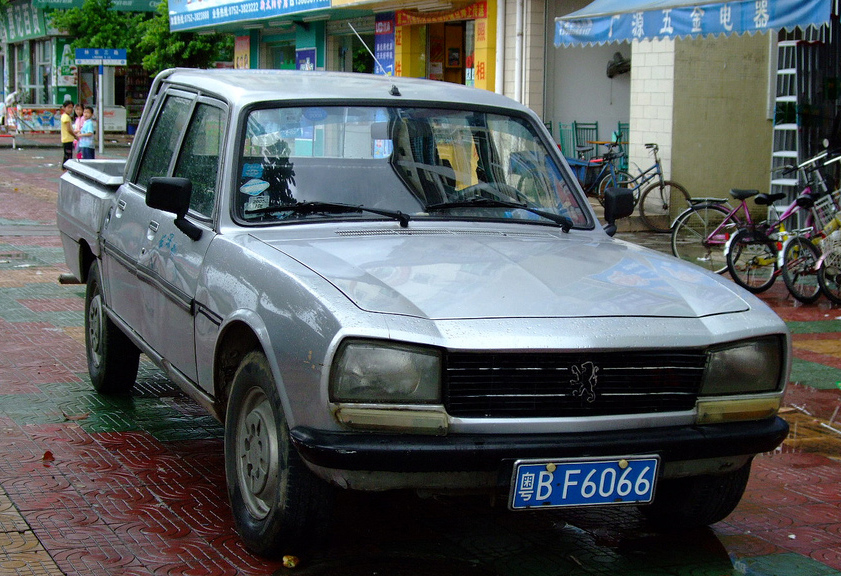
A locally developed crew cab version of the Peugeot 504 pickup

One of the first foreign-Chinese joint auto-making ventures, over its eleven-year lifespan the company only recorded production of about 100,000 cars.

Manufacturing two models originally sold via fleet sales, its products were mostly used as taxis or by government employees. Fleet sales commenced in 1989, with a model line comprising the Peugeot 505 (1980 design) and 504 (1968 design).

=== Conflict ===
Component localization targets, set to encourage creation of a local supply chain, exacerbated tensions. They were met late if at all, and while the French initially profited from parts sales, Chinese consumers saw increased component localization from inexperienced suppliers lead to inferior products. In spite of Chinese resistance, Peugeot repatriated profits, and cultural conflicts continued throughout. By 1993, a soured Peugeot saw its now-inferior models out-completed by better offerings with sales dropping to 2,544 while competing Shanghai VW built no less than 146,000 cars—fifty percent of the overall market. By 1996, the Guangzhou government decided it no longer wanted a French foreign partner. Peugeot removed itself in 1997, and Guangzhou Automotive chose to begin a new joint venture with Honda.

== Ownership ==
PSA Peugeot Citroën held 22% ownership, with a total foreign ownership of 26% to 30%.

== Model gallery ==
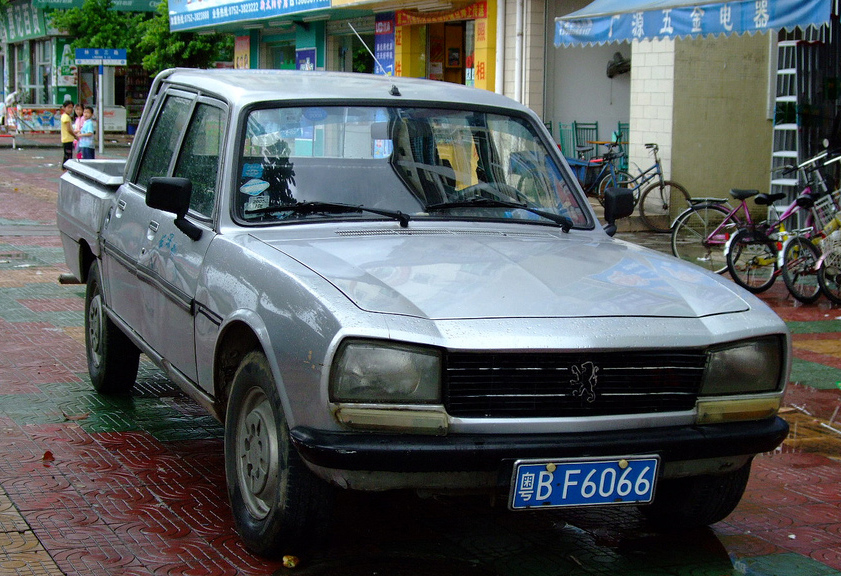
1989-1997
广州标致GP7200卡车
GAC-Peugeot GP 7200 Truck

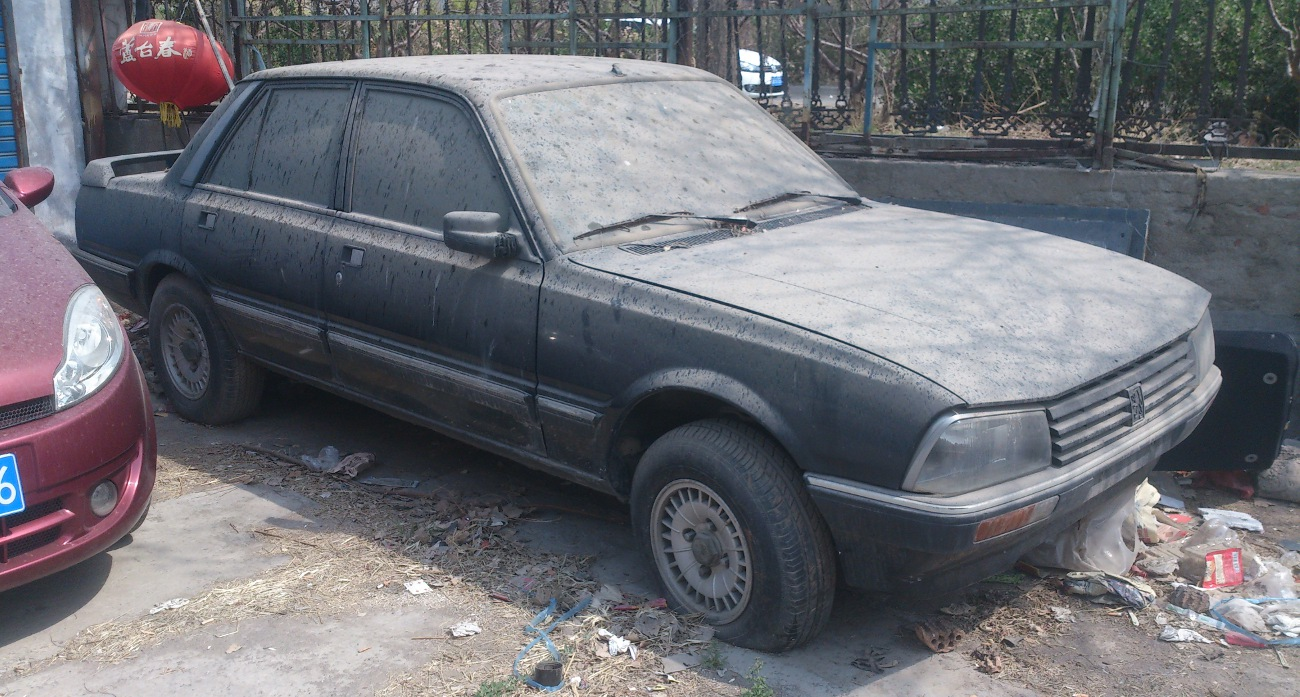
1990-1997
广州标致GP7202/7203
GAC-Peugeot GP 7202/7203
