= Automotive industry by country =

This article provides an overview of the automotive industry in countries around the world.

The United States was the world's largest automobile producer by volume from the early years of the 20th century until the 1980s, when it was overtaken by Japan. In 2009, China became the world's largest vehicle producer.

== Africa ==
=== Algeria ===
in 2014 a Partnership between Daimler and the Ministry of Defense for the manufacture of trucks and armored cars will produce 18,000 Mercedes-Benz units annually in accordance with international quality standards applied by Mercedes-Benz at its plants around the world, while the rest of the quota will be owned by the German companies specialized in mechanical industries (MAN and Ferrostaa). The same standards will be applied in both Tiaret, which will produce 10.000 G-Class SUVs and utility wagons of average size annually, while the production site of engines in Constantine will produce 26,000 water cooled engines by licenses production for the Marks Meto – Deutz – Daimler respectively, to prepare the cars and industrial machinery, agricultural machines, and machines of public works, as the production will be launched in 2014.

The National company of industrial vehicles (SNVI) in Rouiba, as part of an Algerian-German-Emirati investment project five truck models to be assembled on the same industrial site namely Actros, Atego, Axor and Unimog in addition to other bus models will reach some 15,000 trucks and 1,500 buses in 2018 and 2019.

In October 2015 Iran Khodro group intends to establish a car assembly plant in Algeria located 300 km from Algiers, will produce 30,000 cars / year, three options open to the group for that and they will have to choose between relocation of Senegalese assembly line which is the first option, that of Bardo (pick-up), and that of the establishment of a new chain.

In December 2015 an agreement signed with an Algerian company and the Iranian auto making group Saipa will produce X100, Tiba I and II, Saina and Pride in the country as of mid-2016.

Emin Auto, an Algerian-Turkish society, including representatives of several Chinese vehicle brands, should sign the project to build an assembly line of commercial vehicles in Ain Temouchent Thursday, January 7, 2016. The project is in partnership with the Chinese Jianghuaa Automobile Corporation JAC Motors and Emin Auto. This project will be located in the new industrial zone Tamazoura, 54 km (34 mi) (Ain Temouchent) over an area of 34 hectares (84 acres). This assembly unit will generate 270 job positions at first to move to 450 jobs during its fifth year of production.

The plant is expected to produce 10,000 trucks a year, a volume that will be raised, in the 10th year some 100 000 vehicles/year.

Truck industry also has a ration in the market Renault Trucks, a subsidiary of Volvo and the Algerian group BSF Souakri signed a Memorandum of Understanding for the creation of a vehicle assembly plant in Algeria, which will be based in Meftah, Blida. The vehicles brands Volvo group will be assembled in this unit, This plant has the potential to become an important element in the global network of Iveco. The group's president, Pierre Lahutte, said that the company has an international development model based on partnership, like with Ival in Algeria. Moreover, the country represents 13% of group sales in Africa.

Toyota Algeria announced three projects in the assembly and manufacture of spare parts. The first project relates to the study launch an assembly line of heavyweights Hino brand, with a capacity of 2,000 trucks per year. The plant will produce light truck tonnage, the Hino 300 series.

For the second project, it is a Toyota vehicle assembly possibility in Algeria. The Algerian representative of the Japanese giant, in collaboration with Toyota, account and conduct a study on the Algerian automobile market "to identify patterns that could be assembled locally." Toyota Algeria also announced the launch of a production unit of brake pads and brake shoes, with a medium-term capacity of 200,000 units to 300,000 units respectively.

=== Egypt ===
The beginnings of the Egyptian automotive industry date back to 1960. During the socialist era, the government pledged to transform the country from an agricultural economy to an industrial one, and the first completely Egyptian car was produced. The car soon went out of production, as it could not compete with foreign brands, especially following the end of socialism and the move toward a more liberal market. It was not until 1985 that automotive giant, General Motors (GM), set up its first assembly plant in Egypt, revolutionizing the industry.

In the almost 40 years since, the Egyptian automotive assembly business has grown from just three plants relying on mostly imported components to 16 businesses with 26 assembly lines, manufacturing now nearly 100,000 units annually of passenger cars, light commercial vehicles, trucks, and buses, as well as 300 factories that produce most automotive components (IDA's Vision for the Automotive Industry Report). Besides GM, giants such as BYD, BMW, Nissan, Hyundai, and Daewoo produced a majority of the models in their product lines in their factories in Egypt.

However, it was not until 2004 that the Egyptian automotive market began to expand exponentially, along with the local production of both assembled cars and components. The total production market in Egypt consisted of only 49,335 vehicles in 2004. This figure rose to 116,683 vehicles in 2010; a 136% increase. However, due to the political changes starting in 2011, production was down over 31% in 2012. In 2013, Egypt was the third largest car-producing market in Africa, after South Africa and Morocco.

=== Ghana ===
The government's policies on automobiles have attracted companies such as Toyota, VW, and Nissan. It has been anticipated that Ghana will be one of the fastest growing automobile industries in Africa in the next 5 years.

=== Kenya ===
The Automotive industry in Kenya is primarily involved in the assembly, retail and distribution of motor vehicles. There are a number of motor vehicle dealers operating in the country, with the most established being:

Major Retailers: Toyota East Africa/Toyota Kenya Ltd, Cooper Motor Corporation, General Motors East Africa (GMEA), Simba Colt and DT Dobie.

Major Assemblers: Associated Vehicle Assemblers Ltd (AVA), Kenya Vehicle Manufacturers (KVM), General Motors East Africa (GMEA) and Honda Motorcycle Kenya Ltd
Kenya is currently attempting to completely build its own cars. After building its first car in the late '80s, the Nyayo Car, Kenya has a shot at the industry with Mobius Motors, which was founded in 2009.

=== Morocco ===
Morocco has already overtaken South Africa as the continent's automotive hub and is soon expected to produce more cars a year than Italy. The kingdom is also becoming a major supplier for European auto factories, including Ford Motor Co.'s high-tech plant in Valencia, Spain, which imports car seats, interiors, wiring and other components from Morocco.

A new factory having an auto assembly capability of nearly 400,000 vehicles annually was opened by Renault in February 2012 in Tangier. It will mainly produce cars for the European market. Before 2012, the only other assembly plant in Morocco was the Renault factory in Casablanca.

BYD signed an agreement on December 9, 2017 to open a factory near the Moroccan city of Tangiers to build battery-powered vehicles. BYD will become the third car manufacturer to build cars in the North African state.

Another factory by PSA Peugeot-Citroën, is expected to start production by 2019, with a starting capacity of 90 000 cars/year and a 200 000 cars/year in the future. The main specificity of this factory is the introduction of car engines production for the first time to the country.

=== Nigeria ===
Innoson Vehicle Manufacturing Co. Ltd., shortened as IVM, is a Nigerian automobile and bus manufacturing company. It was founded by Chief Innocent Chukwuma Nwala, and runs a plant in Nnewi in the state of Anambra. Innoson Vehicle Manufacturing is nicknamed Pride Of African Road. 70% of the car parts are produced locally, while the rest is sourced from Japan, China, and Germany.

Innoson Vehicles is the first made in Nigeria vehicle. Nnewi, the city where the company is located is nicknamed 'The Japan of Africa' and it's also known as the Automobile hub of Africa due to the great feat the city has achieved in the Automotive industry since 1970's.

=== South Africa ===
South Africa is traditionally the automotive industry leader in Africa, and produces over half a million vehicles annually. While domestic development of trucks and military vehicles exists, cars built under license of foreign brands are the mainstay. The country has also developed a niche and competitive advantage manufacturing pickup trucks.

=== Tunisia ===
Industries Mécaniques Maghrébines is a Tunisian car manufacturer headquartered in the city of Kairouan. The company was founded in 1982 and closed for the first time in 1988; the plant was reopened in 1991. Since then, the manufacturer has formed subsidiaries to distribute its vehicles in Carthage, Tunis and Oued Smar, Algeria.

The company is a joint-venture between the General Motors Company (20 per cent), Isuzu Motors Ltd. (10 per cent) and the locomotive builder General Motors du Tunisie S.A. (70 per cent). The latter provides the staff for the company.

Wallyscar is a Tunisian car manufacturer, founded in 2006 and based in Ben Arous. Production is 600 units per year.

== Asia ==
=== Azerbaijan ===
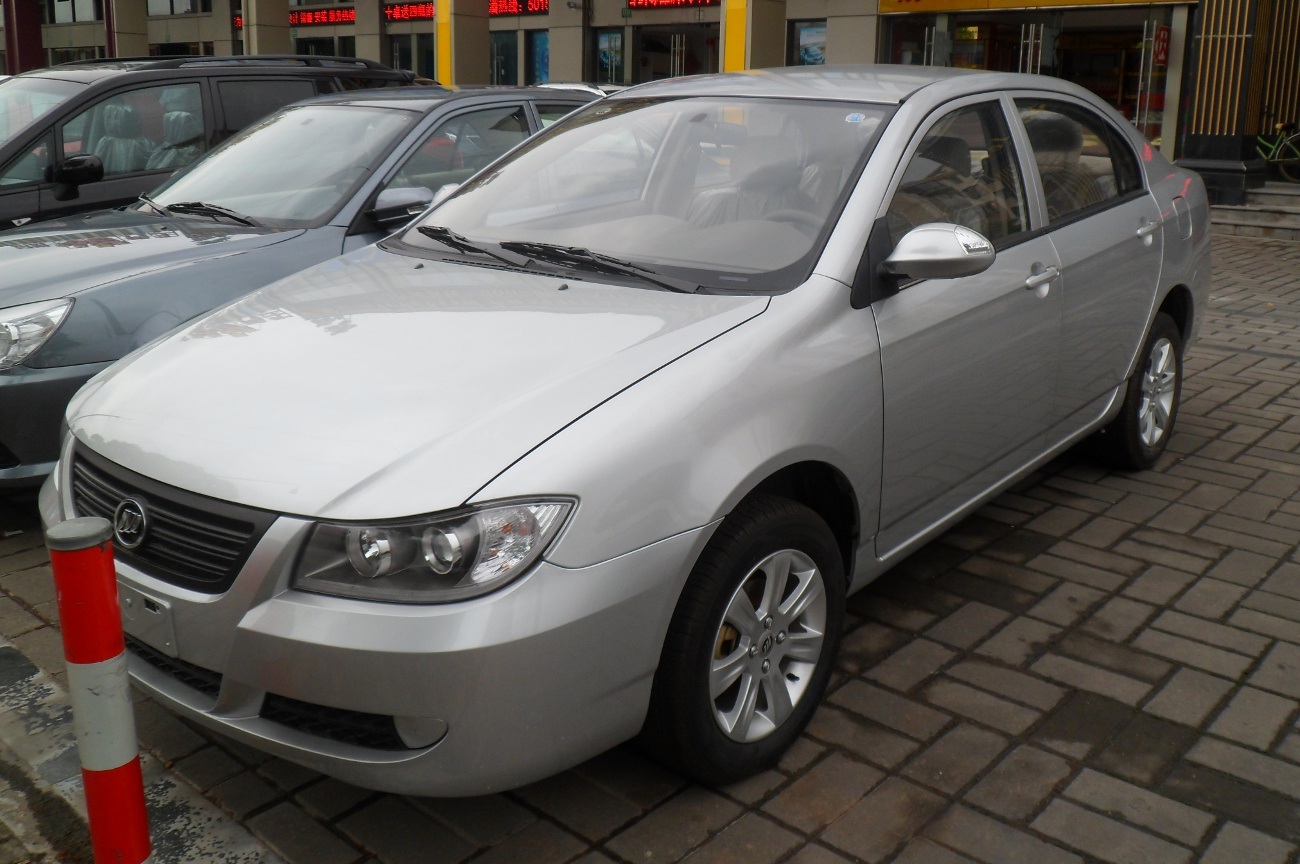
The Chinese Lifan 620 is also assembled in Azerbaijan.

- Ganja Auto Plant (1986–present)
- Azsamand (2005–present)
- Nakhchivan Automobile Plant (2010–present)

Ganja Auto Plant is an auto assembly plant situated in the Ganja city in Azerbaijan. The factory was founded in 1986 for a production run of 30,000 "GAZelle" vans according to the project brief.

AzSamand opened in October 2005 with the support of the Government of Azerbaijan. AzSamand works with Iran Khodro.

Nakhchivan Automobile Plant: Automobile manufacturer in the Nakhchivan Autonomous Republic of Azerbaijan. Nakhchivan Automobile Factory was founded in 2006. It was put into operation in 2010.

=== Bangladesh ===
Auto rickshaws have been producing in Bangladesh since the 1980s and local production of motorcycles began in early 2000. Foreign vehicles manufacturers have been assembling vehicles here for the past 30 years as well and now several automobile companies are in discussion to build automobile factories in the country. Pragoti is the state-run automotive industry, which assembles Mitsubishi Pajero Sport, Tata trucks, and Ashok Leyland minibus. Some privately owned automotive industries are Aftab Automobiles, Runner Automobiles and Walton.

=== China ===
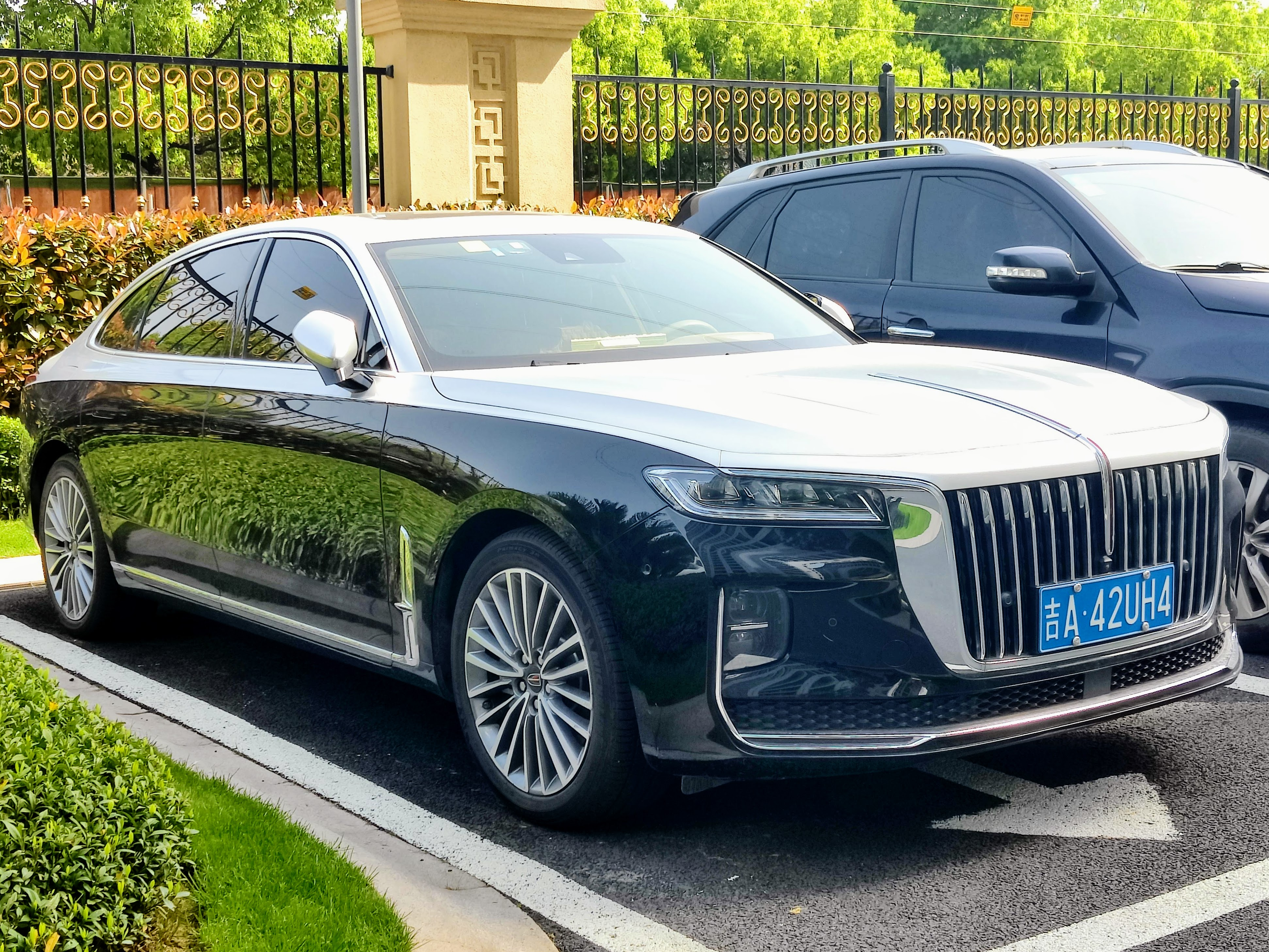
Hongqi H9

The Chinese automotive industry has seen significant developments and transformations over the years during the early twentieth century. However, the Second Sino-Japanese War hampered the progress of the Chinese auto industry, as seen by the relocation of the Changan Automobile factory from Shanghai to Chongqing in the wake of the city's bombing and attack. After the foundation of the People's Republic of China (PRC) in 1949, plants and licensed auto design were established in China with assistance from the Soviet Union in the 1950s, marking the beginning of the country's automobile sector. However, the Chinese automotive industry did not exceed 100–200 thousand automobiles produced per year during the first 30 years of the PRC. It has been developing rapidly since the year 2000. In 2009, 13.83 million motor vehicles were manufactured in China, surpassing Japan as the world's largest automobile producer. Now, annual production of more than 18 million automobiles exceeds that of the United States and Japan combined, or that of the EU. Moreover, with total sales of 13.64 million, China became the largest automobile market in the world for the full year 2009, overtaking the United States.

=== India ===
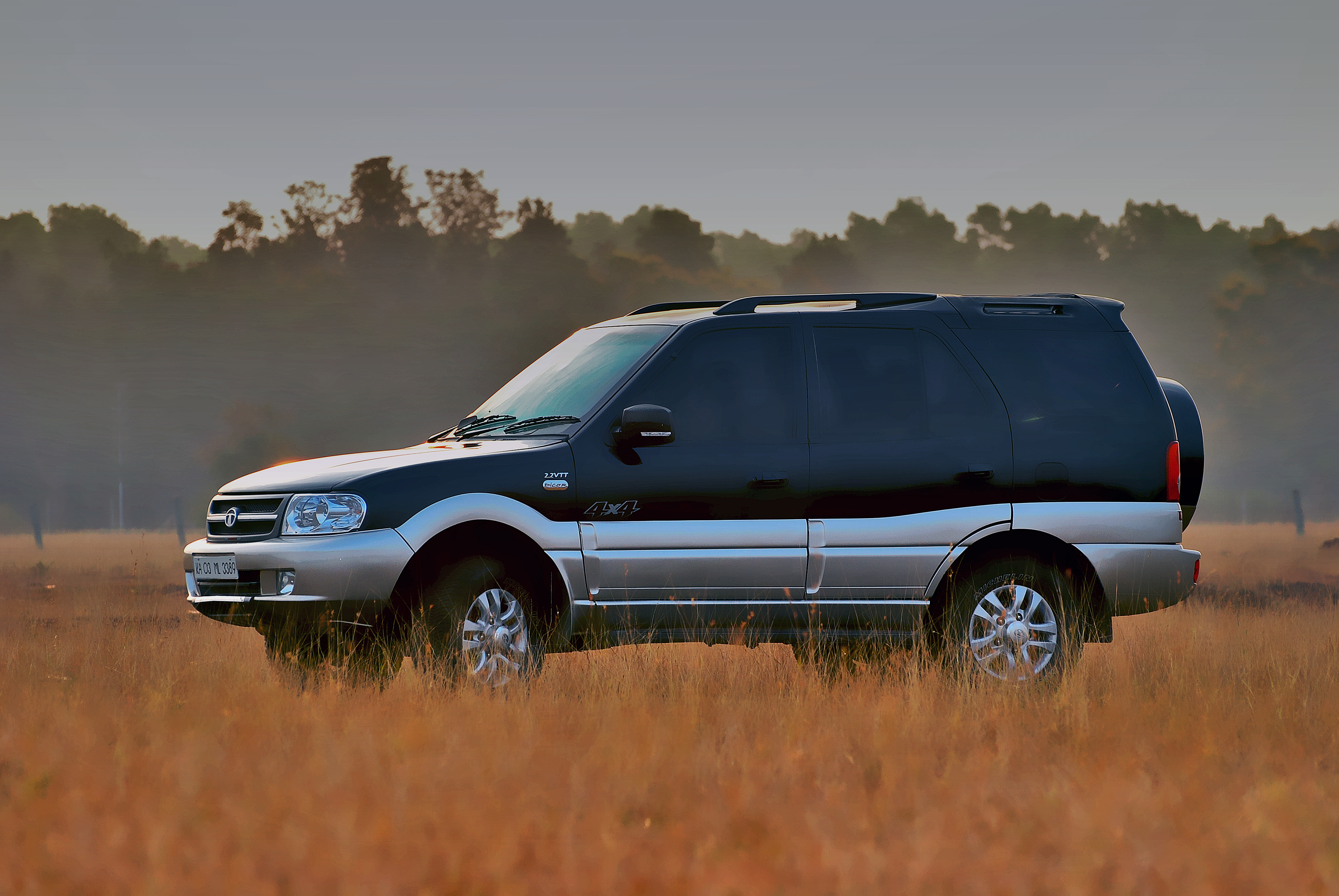
Tata Safari (1998; India's first sports utility vehicle)

An embryonic automotive industry started in India in the 1940s. However, for the next 50 years, the growth of the industry was hobbled by the Socialist policies and the bureaucratic hurdles of the license raj with total restrictions for import of vehicles. Following economic liberalisation in India in 1991 and start of Economic Boom, and the gradual easing of restrictions on industry, India has seen a dynamic 17% annual growth in automobile production and 30% annual growth in exports of automotive components and automobiles. More than 4.78 million automotive vehicles were produced in India in 2017 (an increase of almost thrice since 2005 and more than thirteen times since 1990. India is now the fourth largest automobile producer as of 2018 (beating old and new auto makers such as Germany, South Korea, Belgium, United Kingdom, Italy, Canada, Mexico, Russia, Spain and France) and is the second fastest growing automobile market (after China) in the World. Total turnover of the Indian automobile industry grew 3.6 times from $34 Billion in 2006 to $122 Billion in 2016.

The largest automotive companies in India are Maruti Suzuki, Hyundai Motor India, Mahindra & Mahindra and Tata Motors (In 2008, it launched Tata Nano, the cheapest car in the world at $1,500). Foreign auto companies with plants in India include, Ford, Hyundai, Honda, Kia, Nissan, Toyota, Volkswagen, Audi, Skoda, BMW, Renault, Mitsubishi, Jaguar Land Rover, Fiat, Volvo, Lexus and Mercedes-Benz. Many other global automobile giants such as PSA Group are setting up their plants and Infiniti are also in the process of setting up their manufacturing plants in this country.

=== Indonesia ===
Indonesia with mainly assembly of world's (Japanese and South Korean) brand vehicles is the first South-East Asian auto producer in January–April 2015 with market share 36.54 percent (363,945 units), while Thailand with 25.29 percent. Since 2012, Indonesian automotive product export in value is more than its import.

=== Iran ===
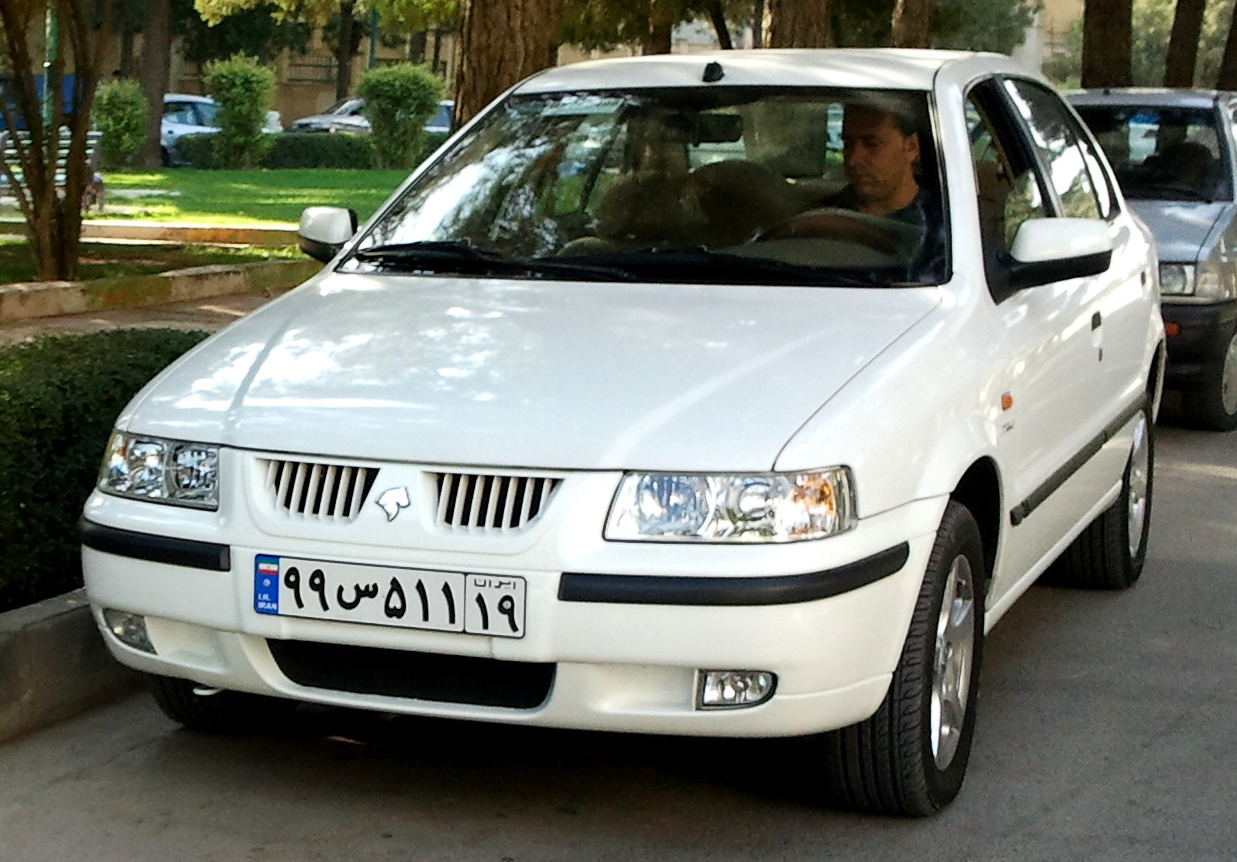
The IKCO Samand is an Iranian-made car and titled first "national car" of Iran.

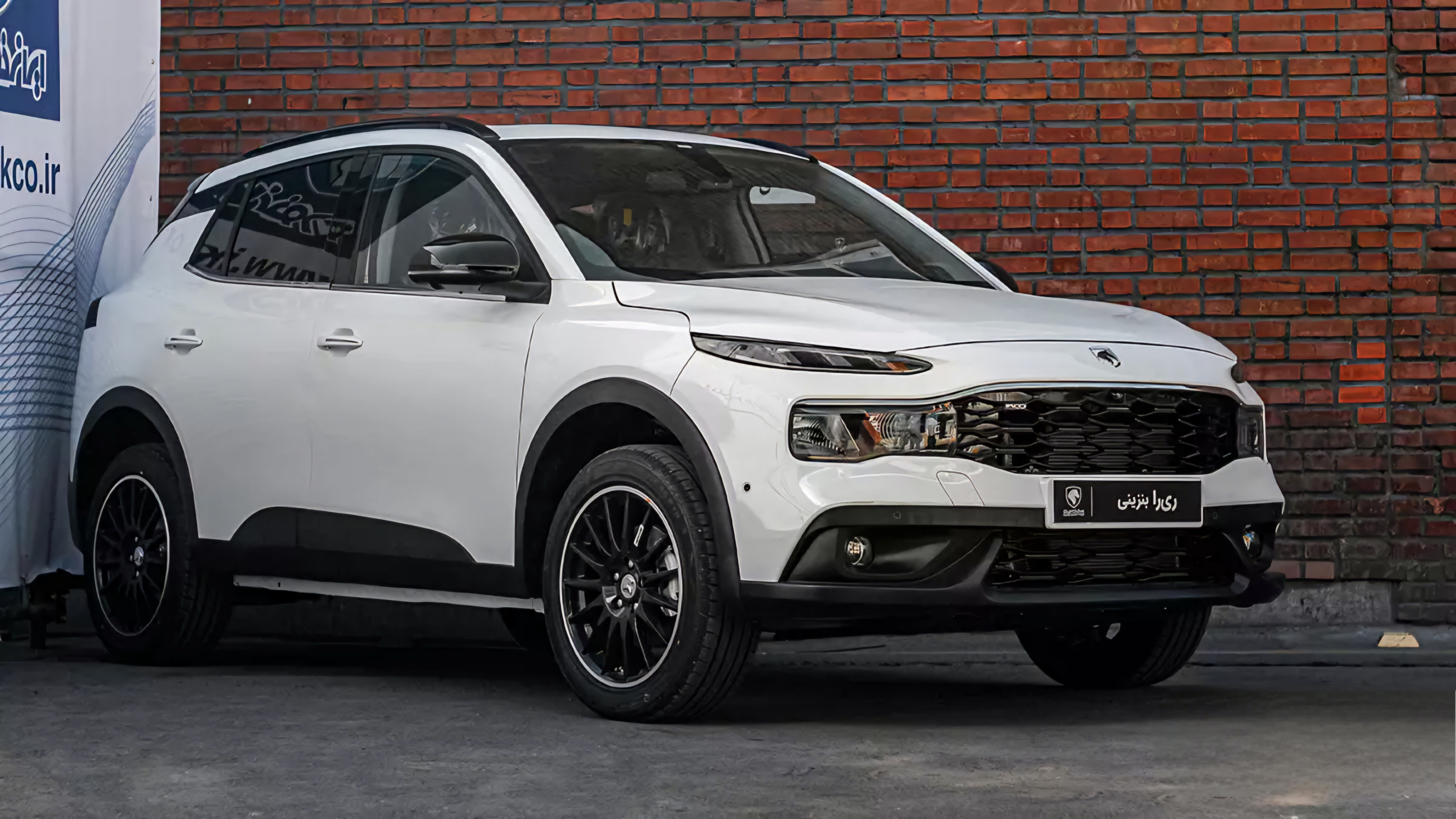
IKCO Reera

Iran developed a significant automotive industry with up to 200,000 annual production under the Shah's regime. There was a decline after the Islamic revolution of 1979 but since the end of the 20th century growth returned, accelerating in recent years. There were 13 public and privately owned automakers within Iran, of which two – Iran Khodro and SAIPA – accounted for 94% of the total domestic production. Iran Khodro, which produced the most prevalent car brand in the country – the Peykan, which has been replaced in 2005 by the Samand – was still the largest with 61% of the market in 2001, while Saipa contributed 33% of Iran's total production in the same year. The other car manufacturers, such as the Bahman Group, Kerman Motors, Kish Khodro, Raniran, Traktorsazi, Shahab Khodro, and others together produced only 6%. These automakers produce a wide range of automobiles including motorbikes, passenger cars such as Saipa's Tiba, vans, mini trucks, medium-sized trucks, heavy duty trucks, minibuses, large size buses and other heavy automobiles used in commercial and private activities in the country. Iran has a fleet of 7 million cars in 2008, which translates to almost one car per ten persons in the country (including pick-ups and buses). Automobile production crossed the 1 million mark in 2005 and Iran car exports reached $1 billion by March 2009. Iran ranked the world's 13th biggest automaker in 2011 with annual production of more than 1.6 million (more than in such old and new auto industries as Belgium, the United Kingdom, Italy, the Czech Republic, and Turkey).

=== Japan ===
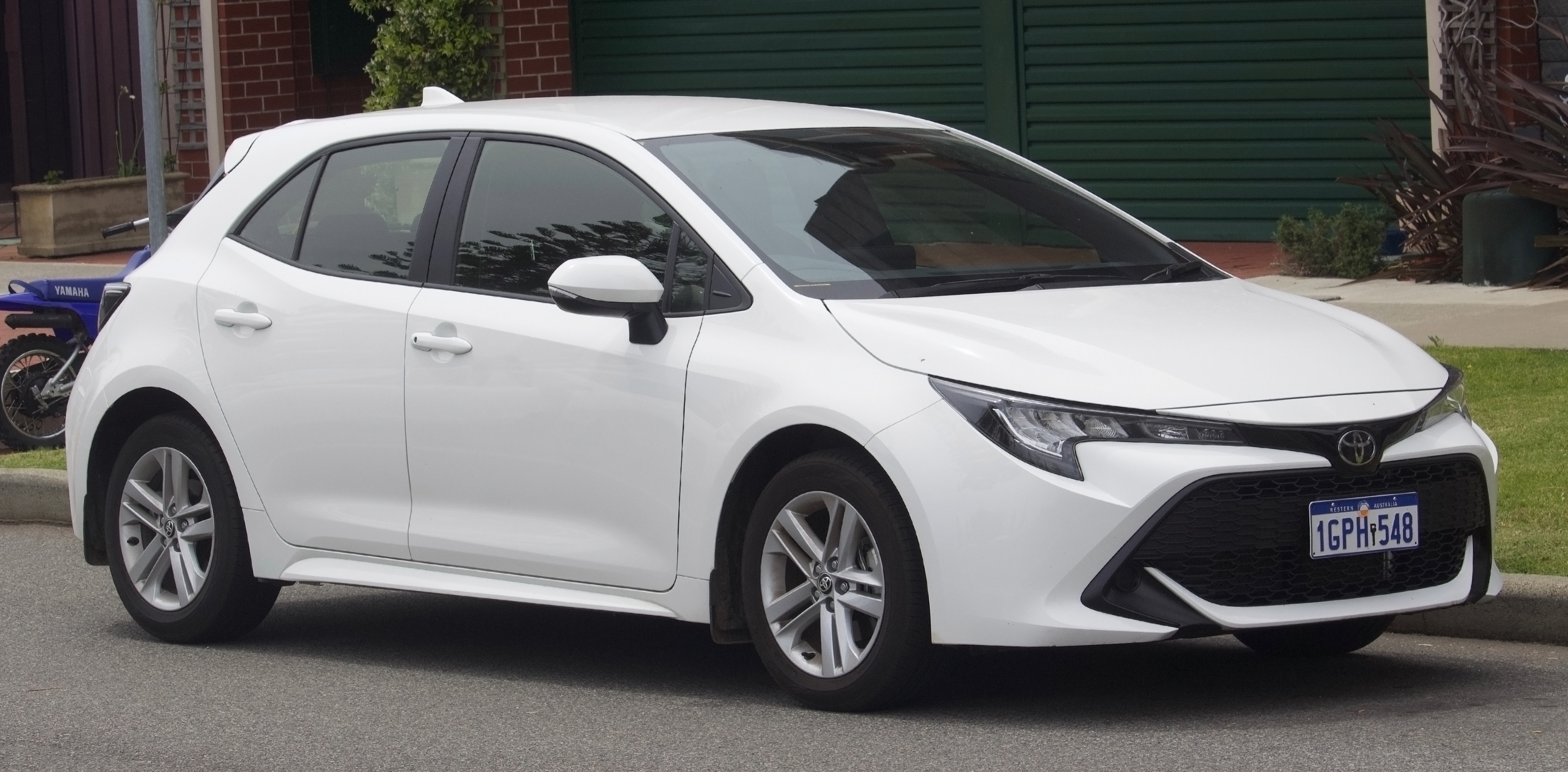
Toyota Corolla

Japanese zaibatsu (business conglomerates) began building their first automobiles in the middle to late 1910s, while designing their own trucks and producing European cars in Japan under license. The breakout of World War II caused many Japanese manufacturers to halt the design and production of vehicles, but in the 1950s and 1960s restoration occurred. In the 1970s Japan was the world's pioneer robotics manufacturer of vehicles. The automotive industry in Japan grew rapidly between the 1970s–1990s (when it was oriented both for domestic use and wide world export) and after being second largest producer in the world (behind the United States), it is now the third largest (after China and the US) with an annual production of 8–10 million vehicles. During the 1980s and 1990s, overtaking the US, Japan became the world's leading automobile manufacturer with up to 13 million vehicles produced per year, a significant part of that went to export including to the United States. Japanese investments grew an auto industry in many (and not Asian only) countries.

=== Jordan ===
Land Rover, in a joint venture with the Shahin Group and Ole Jordan, assembles Defenders and Discoveries at the Land Rover Aqaba Assembly Plant in Aqaba. About 1,000 workers are employed there, assembling 5,000 units annually.

=== Malaysia ===
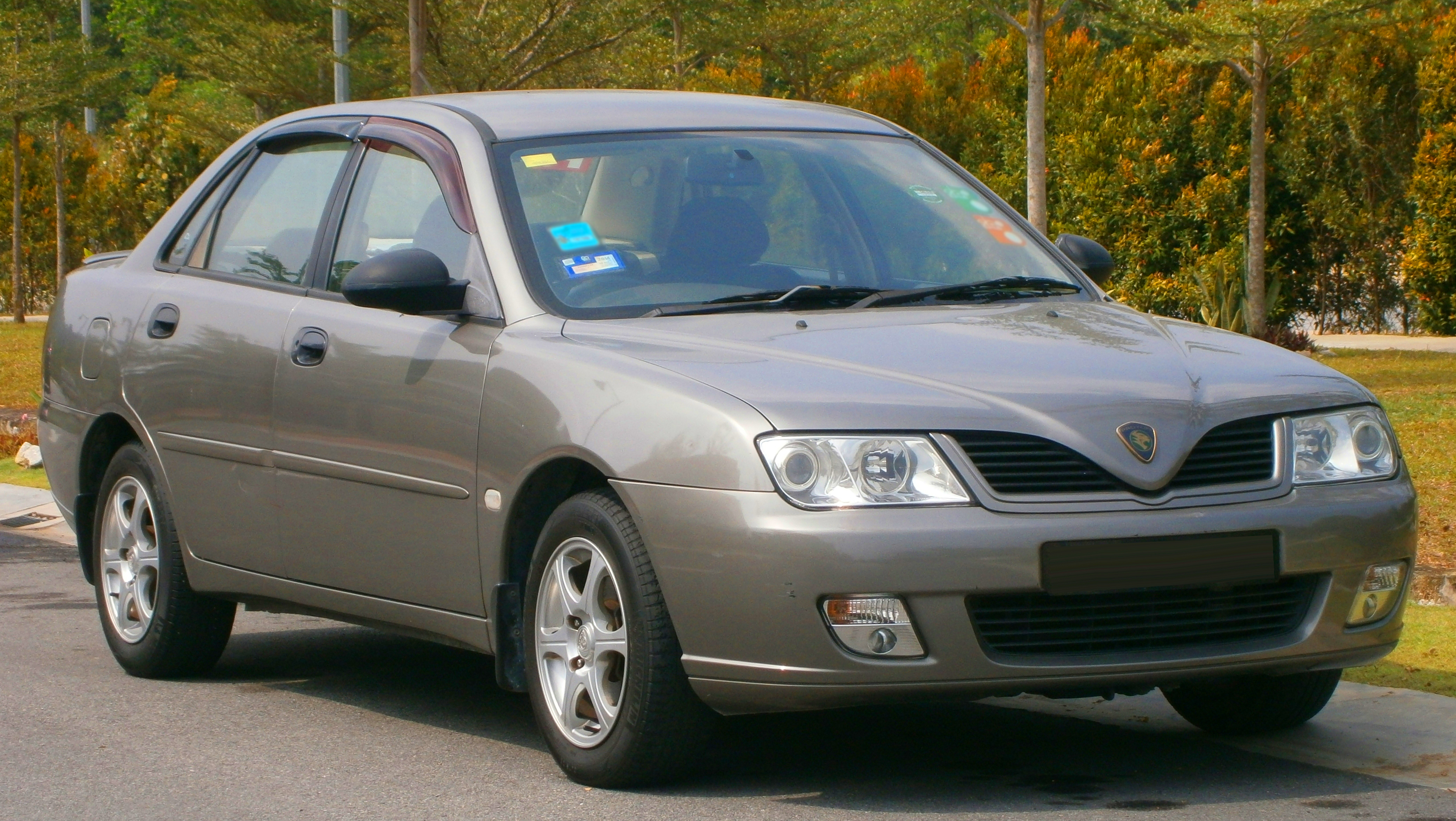
Proton Waja, the first indigenously designed Proton car

The automotive industry in Malaysia is perhaps one of the freshest and most steadily growing markets, catering for needs worldwide (except for America and Continental Europe). Malaysia is the third largest South-East Asian automaker, outputting more than half a million vehicles per year. Some of the Malaysian companies produce some models in collaboration with Japanese, Chinese, South Korean or European manufacturers, while also developing fully indigenous Malaysian made cars. The list of car manufacturers is as follows:

- Proton (Perusahaan Otomobil Nasional Berhad), being the pioneer of Malaysian car manufacturer.
- Perodua (Perusahaan Otomobil Kedua Berhad), of which engines are based on Daihatsu models.
- Bufori & TD2000, "Antique Cars" manufacturers based in Malaysia (although originally from Australia).
- Naza (Naza Group of Companies – assembles Kia Motors and Peugeot vehicles).
- Inokom (assembles Hyundai Motors and BMW vehicles).

=== North Korea ===
The North Korean motor vehicle production has military, industrial and construction goals mainly, and private car ownership by citizens is not allowed (all cars are serving government officials). It has Soviet origins, evident in the subsequent practice of cloning foreign specimens, though in one recent automobile joint-venture, North Korea developed a wide-range automotive industry with production of all types of vehicles (an urban and off-road mini, luxury, SUV cars, a small, midi, heavy and super-heavy cargo, haulage, construction and off-road trucks, a mini buses, a usual and articulated buses, trolleybuses and trams). Automotive production is less than 40,000-50,000. North Korea did not join the OICA, meaning that information about its motor vehicle industry is very limited and poor.

=== Pakistan ===
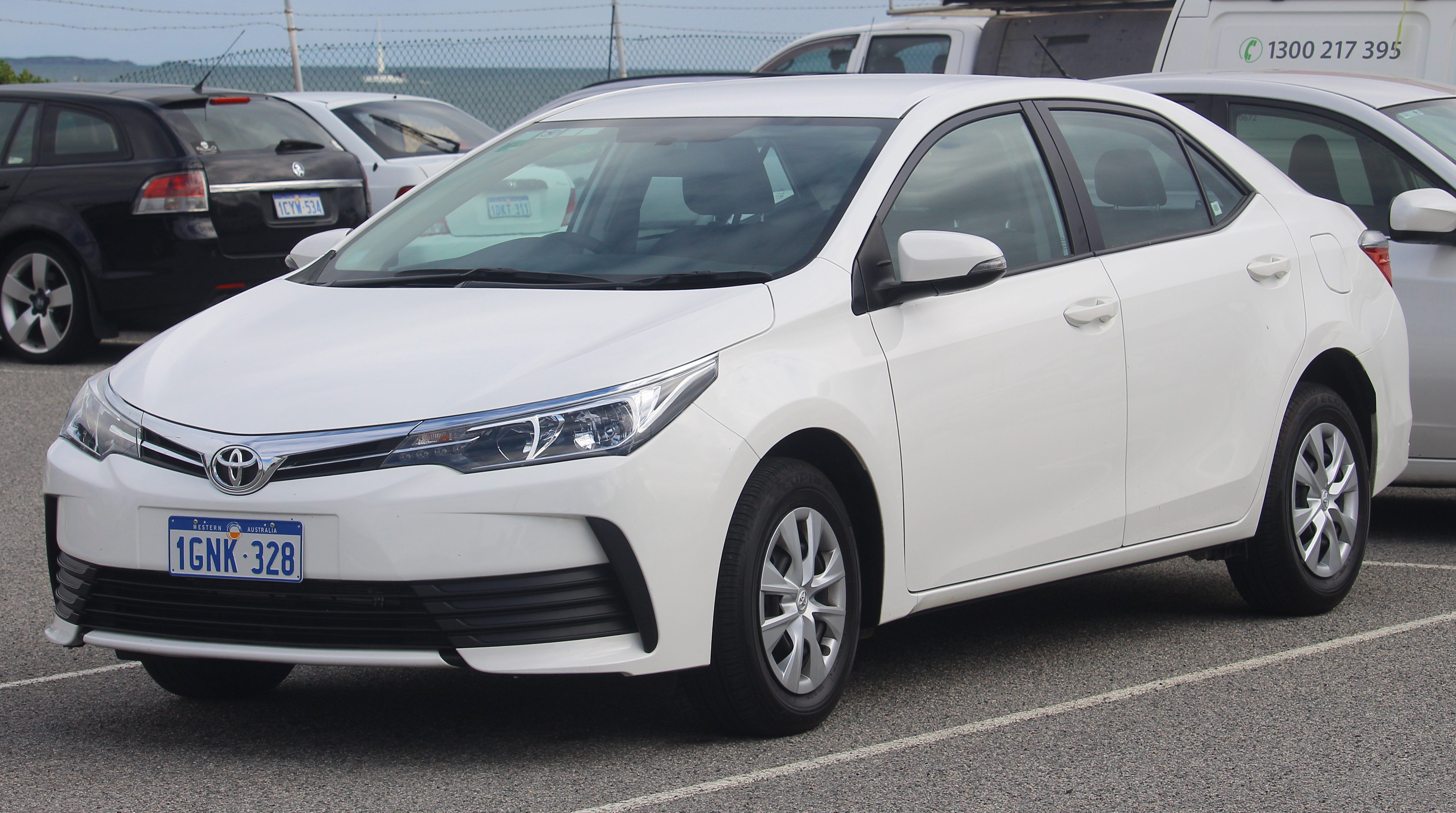
Toyota Indus's Corolla is the most manufactured car in Pakistan. In 2017, 52,874 models were made.

The automobile industry has been an active and growing field in Pakistan for a long time, however not as much established to figure in the prominent list of the top automotive industries, having a stable annual production of between 100,000 and 170,000 vehicles. Surprisingly, despite its production volume, only a few car models are assembled in the country and customers have a very small variety of vehicles to choose from. The lack of competition in the auto industry due to the dominance of a few players, and restrictions on imports in the form of heavy duties have resulted in very high prices of cars in the country. Currently some of the major world automakers have set up assembly plants or are in joint ventures with local companies, including Toyota, General Motors, Honda, Suzuki, and Nissan Motors. The total contribution of auto industry to GDP in 2007 was 2.8% which was estimated to increase significantly over the next decade. The auto sector presently contributes 16% to the manufacturing sector which is predicted to increase even further. Master truck manufacturing, Al Haaj motors and FAW joint venture for producing Chinese cars, trucks and dumpers. However, on 19 March 2016, Pakistan passed the "Auto Policy 2016-21", which offers tax incentives to new automakers to establish manufacturing plants in the country.

=== Philippines ===
The Philippines has a small auto industry with more than 85,000 Japanese (Toyota, Mitsubishi, Nissan, Suzuki, Honda) 8,000 American brand Ford, 6,000 South Korean vehicles Hyundai, Kia, SsangYong produced annually. In addition, there are a number of small independent firms who assemble and fabricate jeepneys and other similar vehicles, using surplus engines and drivetrain parts from Japan and Taiwan.

=== South Korea ===
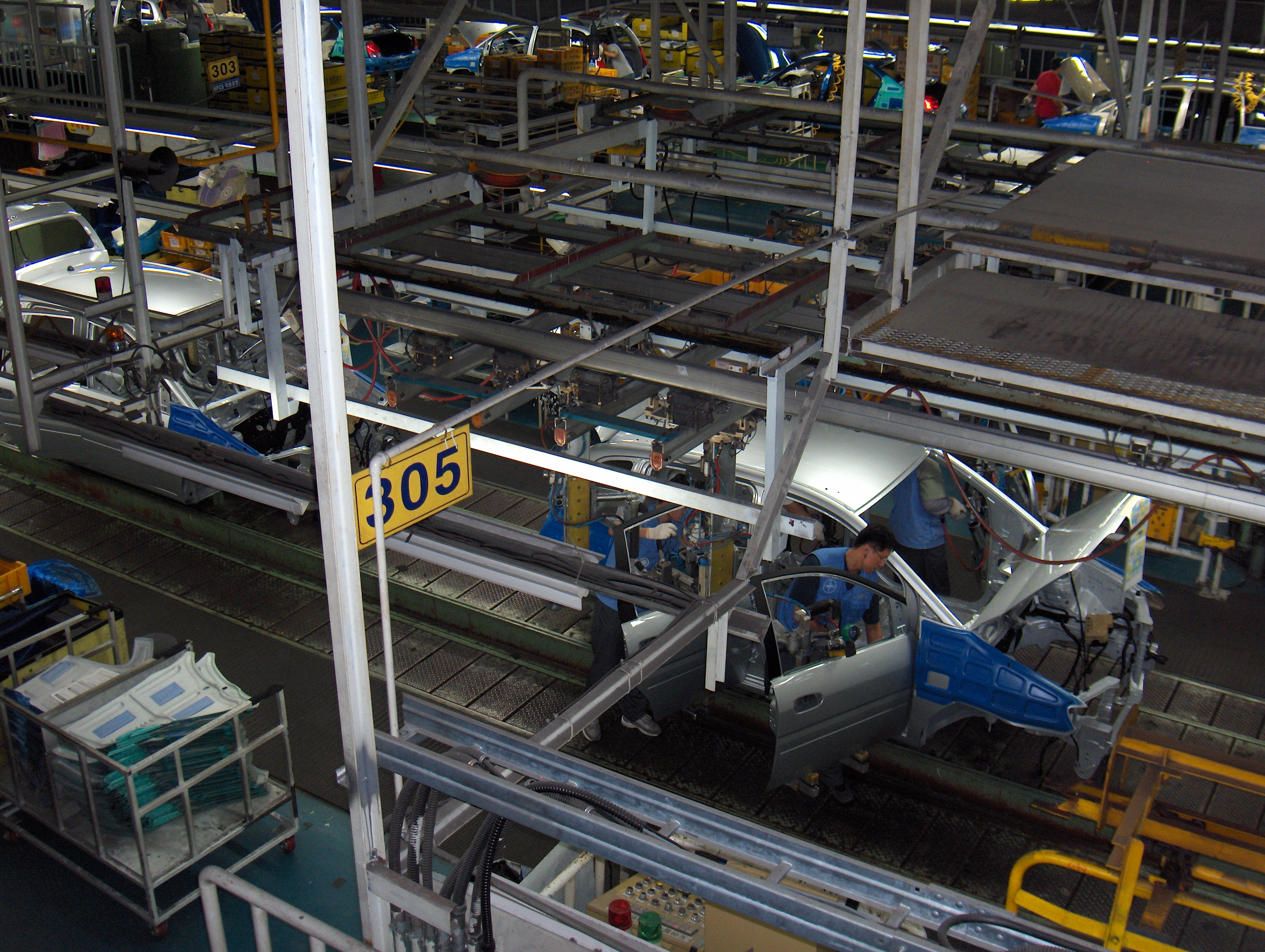
Assembly line at Hyundai Motor Company car factory in Ulsan, South Korea

The South Korean automobile industry is today the sixth largest in the World in terms of production volume (concedes to China, United States, Japan, Germany and India only) and the sixth largest in terms of export volume, achieved more than 4.6 million vehicles produced in 2011. South Korea produced more than 4.2 million vehicles in 2016. Fifty years ago, its initial operations were merely the assembling of parts imported from Japan and the United States. The Hyundai Kia Automotive Group is today the second largest automaker in Asia, after Toyota. Annual domestic output exceeded one million units in 1988. In the 1990s, the industry manufactured numerous in-house models, demonstrating not only its capabilities, and signaling its coming of age thanks to the heavy investment to infrastructure in the country over the decades. The quality of their automobiles has improved dramatically in recent years, gaining international recognition.

=== Taiwan ===
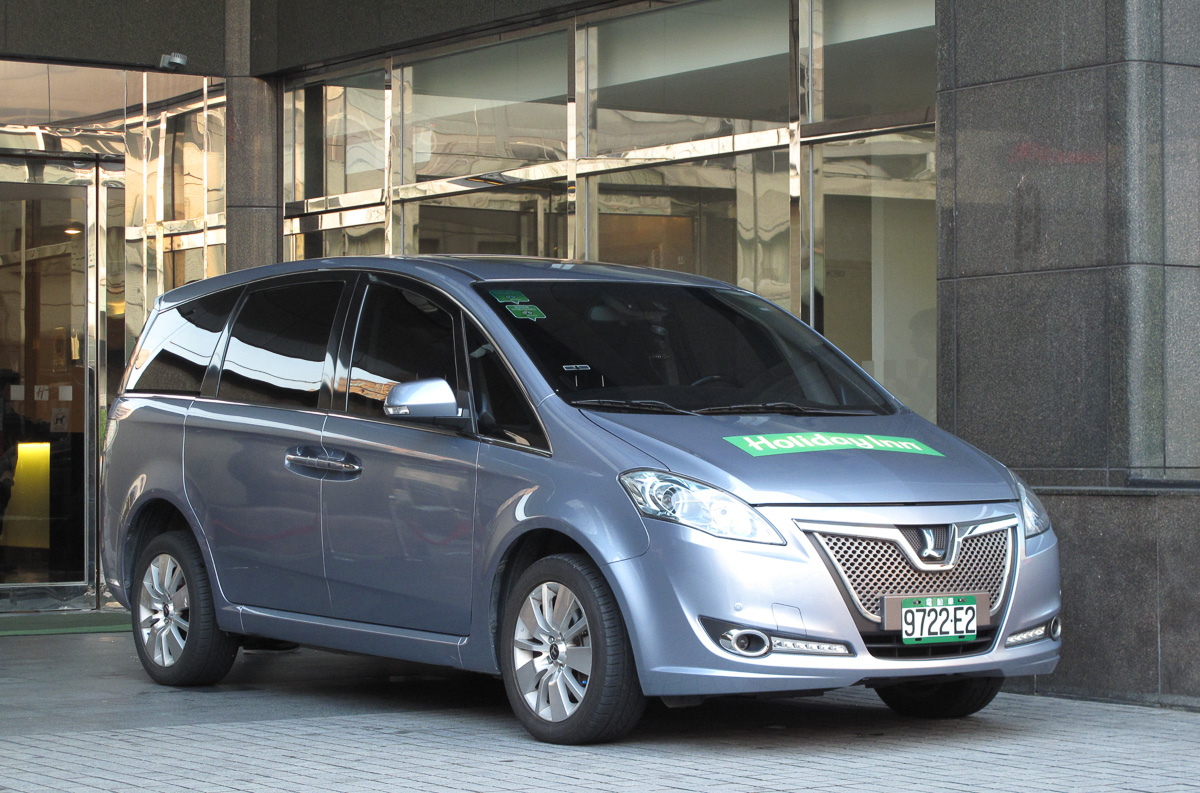
Luxgen M7

The Japanese manufacturers that have (or had) production facilities in Taiwan are: Honda (Honda Taiwan Motor, in Pingtung), Isuzu (Taiwan Isuzu Motors, in Taipei), Mazda (through Ford Lio Ho, in Taipei), Mitsubishi (China Motor Corporation, in Taipei), Nissan, Subaru (Ta Ching Motors, in Pingtung), Suzuki (Tai Ling Motor, motorcycles, in Pingcheng, and Prince Motors, automobiles, in Taipei), and Toyota (Kuozui Motors, in Zhongli and Guanyin).

Other foreign manufacturers that have (or had) production facilities in Taiwan are: Chrysler (through China Motor Corporation, in Taipei), General Motors, Daewoo (Formosa Automobile, in Taipei), Hyundai (joint venture with San Yang Motors, in Taipei) and DAF (through Formosa Automobile, in Taipei).

Domestic brands include Tobe and Luxgen.

=== Thailand ===
Thailand is more rapidly grown in the 2000s, largest in South-Asia and 14th in the World auto producent with annual output nearly 1.5 million (that is more than in such old and new auto makers as Belgium, United Kingdom, Italy, Czech Republic, Turkey) of vehicles developed and issued by foreign (Japanese, South Korean, etc.) assist. The Thai-based automobile manufacturer is ThaiRung or well known as TR, manufactured by Thai Rung Union Car Public Co. Ltd. (TRU). The company was established in 1967 in Bangkok, Thailand. Original name was Thai Rung Engineering Co. Ltd., and changed its name to Thai Rung Union Car Co. Ltd. in 1973. TRU was listed on the Stock Exchange of Thailand in 1994. TRU business is ranging from product design and development, automotive parts manufacturing, industrial equipment manufacturing, car assembly lines and financial business. Some discontinued TR vans powered by Land Rover engine in combination with Thai-developed body design and platform. Modern TR cars are built on small or medium trucks base into SUV or seven-seat multi-purpose vehicles using TR-owned technology, design, development and assembly skills. The current models are 2009 TR Adventure (based on Isuzu D-Max) and TR Allroader (based on Thai-version Chevrolet Colorado).

=== Uzbekistan ===
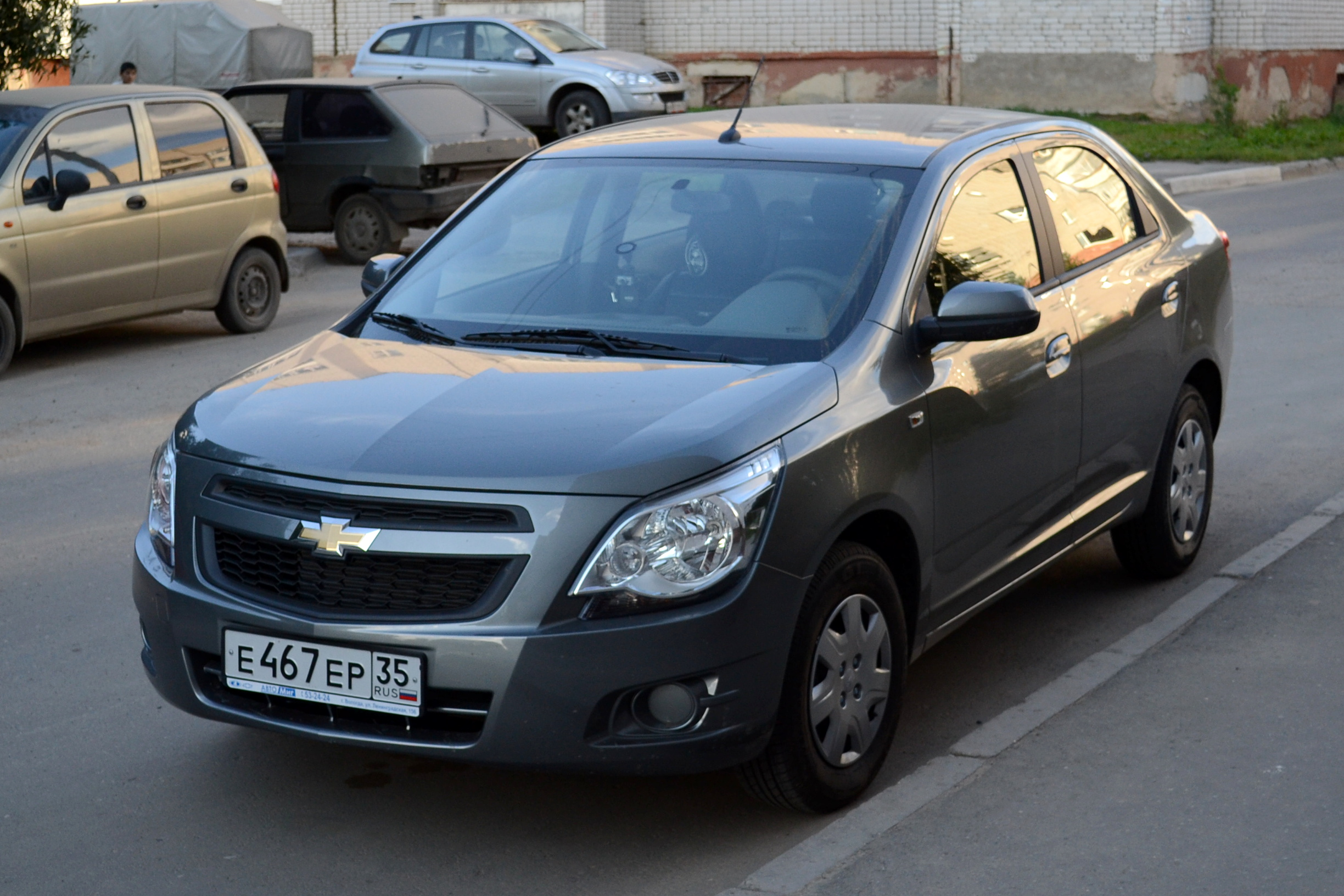
Uzbekistani-made Chevrolet Cobalt

Before 1992, Uzbekistan had absolutely no automotive industry, being part of the Soviet Union. Earlier, UzDaewooAuto, SamAuto, UzAuto Motors, UzTruck&Bus Motors new auto producing plants were built with South Korean, Germany and American help. Now that production of passenger vehicles growth up to 300 thousand per year, moreover there are more than 28 OEM manufacturers like engine, car windows and others. Uzbekistan exports automobiles and OEM components to Russia and other CIS countries.

UzAuto Motors, a joint venture, with manufacturing operations in Asaka [Uzbekistan] and in Khorezem region [Uzbekistan] features five vehicle assembly lines and one stamping operations plant with a growing local supply base supplemented by commodities and automotive parts largely from Asia Pacific region (e.g., steel coil from Russia, advanced technology parts from South Korea, etc.). Moreover, a joint venture with manufacturing operation in Samarkan region [Uzbekistan] 2 commercial vehicle production plants. With multi-shift operations, the number of employees in automotive industry in Uzbekistan estimated around 27000 people.

=== Vietnam ===
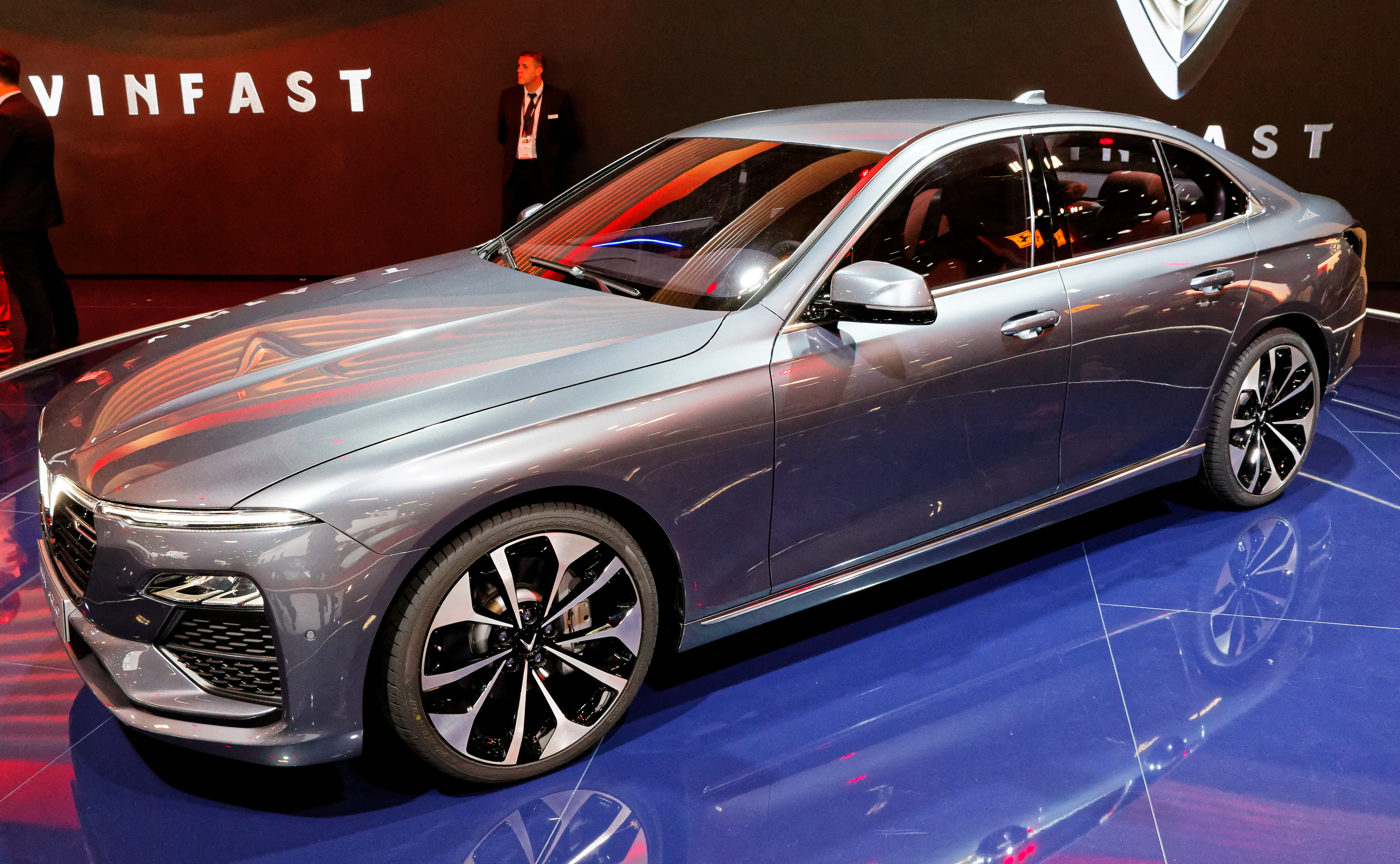
VinFast LUX A2.0, an executive sedan produced by Vietnamese domestic automaker VinFast

Completely dependent on Soviet imports earlier, Vietnam since the 2000s began to develop its own automotive industry with Japanese-South Korean-Malaysian assistance and, having yet near 40,000 per year capability, accounts as a prospective maker and market in South-East Asia. In 3rd quarter of 2017, Prime Minister of Vietnam Nguyễn Xuân Phúc announced that Vietnam's second largest automaker had started: VinFast.

== Europe ==
European Automobile Manufacturers Association announced that May 2013 sales across the 27-nation European Union dropped to 1.04 million cars. August 2013 Year to date became the worst sales year since 1990, with 8.14 million autos sold.

=== Austria ===
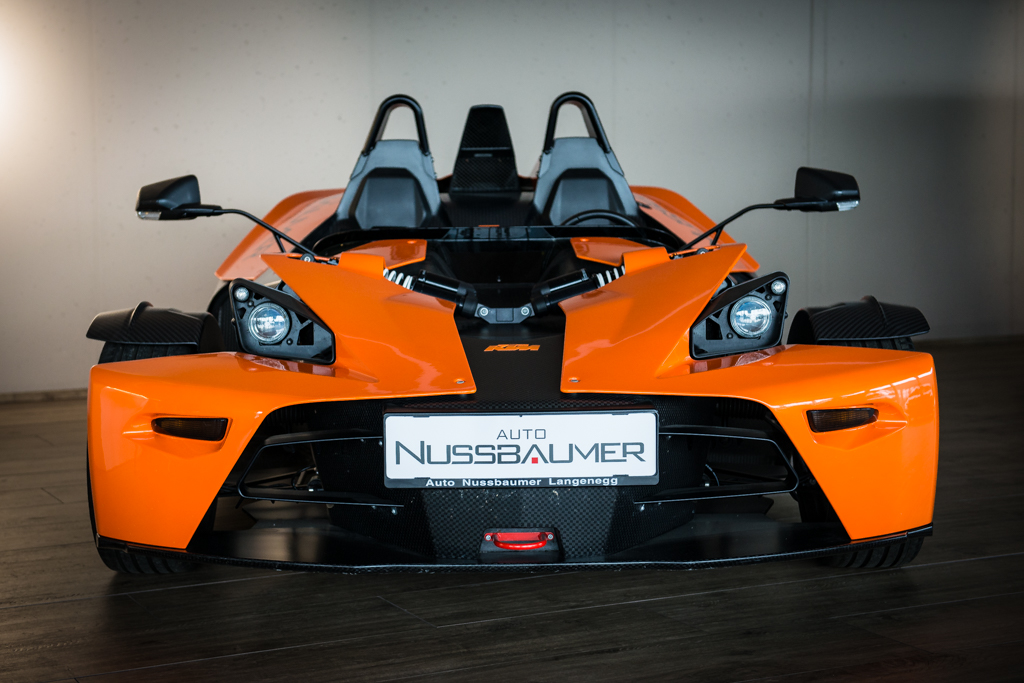
KTM X-Bow in Racing

For a long time, Austria imported cars and had small domestic production of trucks and military Steyr vehicles only. Magna Steyr is now a contract manufacture that has built a number of cars for foreign companies, most recently for Aston Martin and Mini. The motorcycle manufacturer KTM produces the X-Bow sports car.

There is Opel production in Vienna.

=== Belarus ===
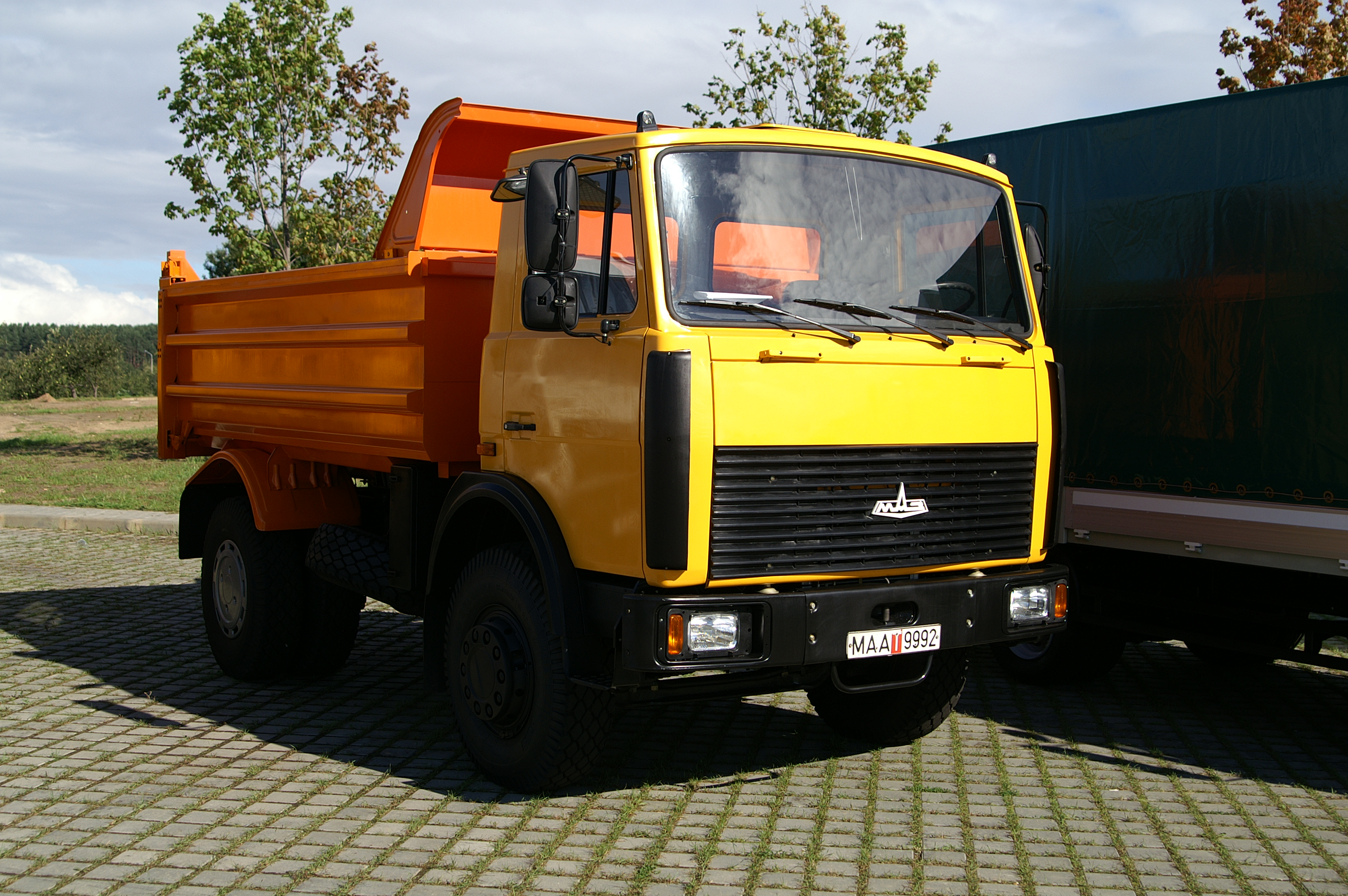
MAZ truck

Belarus had third by volume part of automotive industry of the Soviet Union with near 40,000 annual production. Since that times Belarus specializes on production of own designed superheavy, heavy and middle trucks mainly plus post-Soviet developed buses, trolleybuses and trams. Auto manufacturers in Belarus include MAZ, BelAZ and Neman.

=== Belgium ===
At the beginning of the 20th century Belgium had been one of the leading European auto industries with famous and technically advanced brands. But domestic producers did not grow and soon disappeared. At the end of the century Belgium became one of the largest European auto makers with an annual output up to 1.2 million from assembly plants of foreign brands. Its mainly export-oriented auto industry shrunk by half in recent years (to 500 thousand units) due to strong competition with imports from near and far Eastern producers.

=== Bulgaria ===
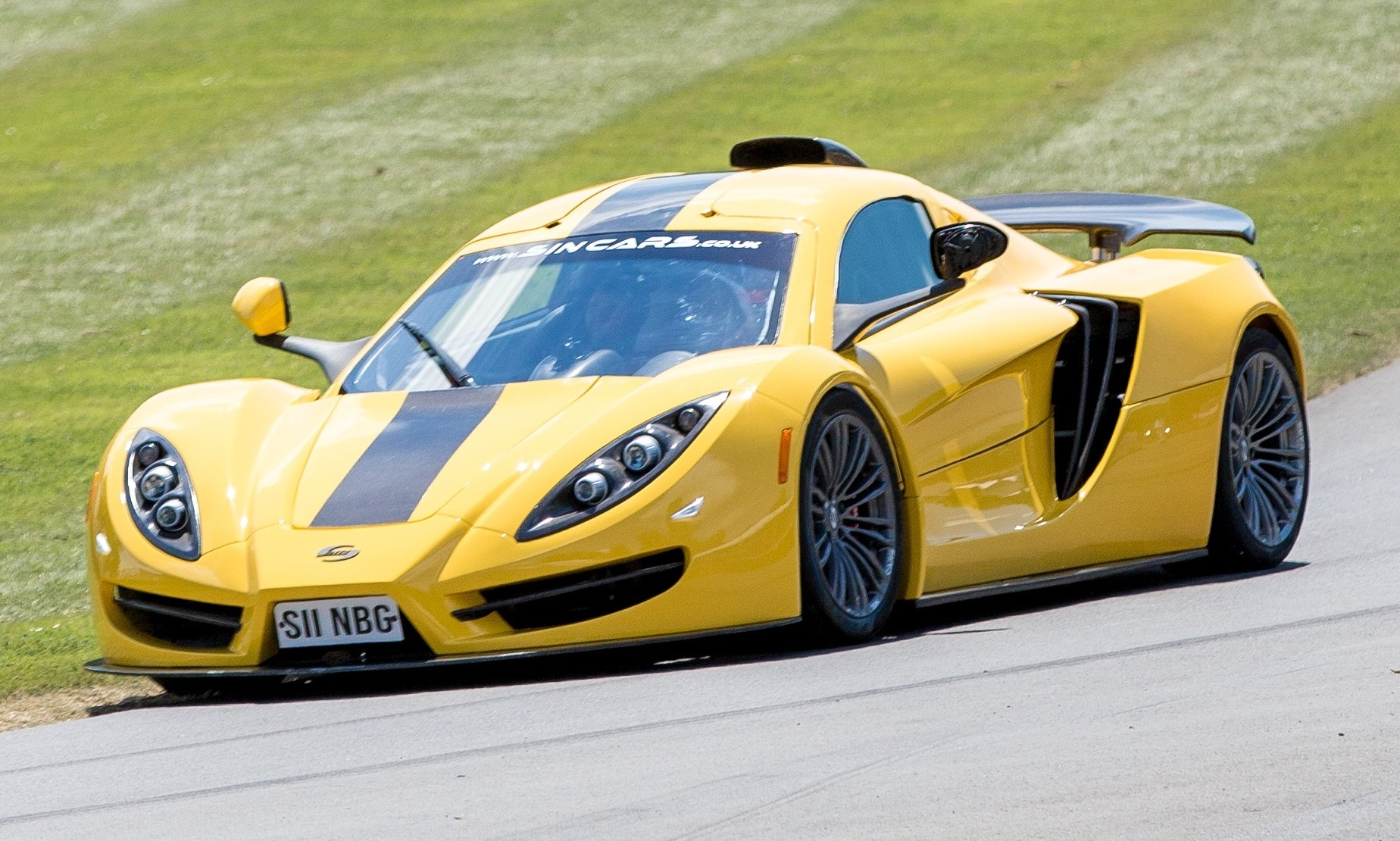
Sin R1

In 2012, Bulgaria's first domestic supercar manufacturer SIN Cars was founded as SIN Cars Limited by the Bulgarian engineer and racing driver Rosen Daskalov in Ruse, Bulgaria. The road-legal Sin R1 features a 6.2-litre V8 and 7.0-litre V8 engine.

Bulgaria's production strongly depended on auto imports from the Soviet bloc earlier and currently depends on other European and Asian countries. Socialist Bulgaria has small auto industry including nearly 20 thousand units of self-developed Chavdar trucks and buses as well as the assembly of Soviet Moskvitch cars.
From 1966 to 1970 in the city of Plovdiv was production of the Bulgarrenault. The factory assembled Renault 8 and Renault 10.
Bulgaria produced the Fiat 850 and Fiat 124 between 1967 and 1971. They were unofficially called "Pirin-Fiat". The plant was in the town of Lovech. The same factory, called "Balkan", also assembled Moskvitch from 1967 to 1988.
In 1994, Rover established Roadcar, a joint venture with a Bulgarian company to produce the Austin Maestro at a new factory in Varna, using CKD kits sent from the UK. Production began in July 1995 and 2,200 cars were assembled before the factory closed in April 1996.
Together with the Bulgarian company Litex Motors, Great Wall Motors has a production base in Bahovitsa, near Lovech. They assembly Voleex, Steed and Hover. The factory has an auto assembly capability of 50,000 vehicles annually. There're plans to be increased to 70,000 vehicles annually in the next few years.

=== Croatia ===
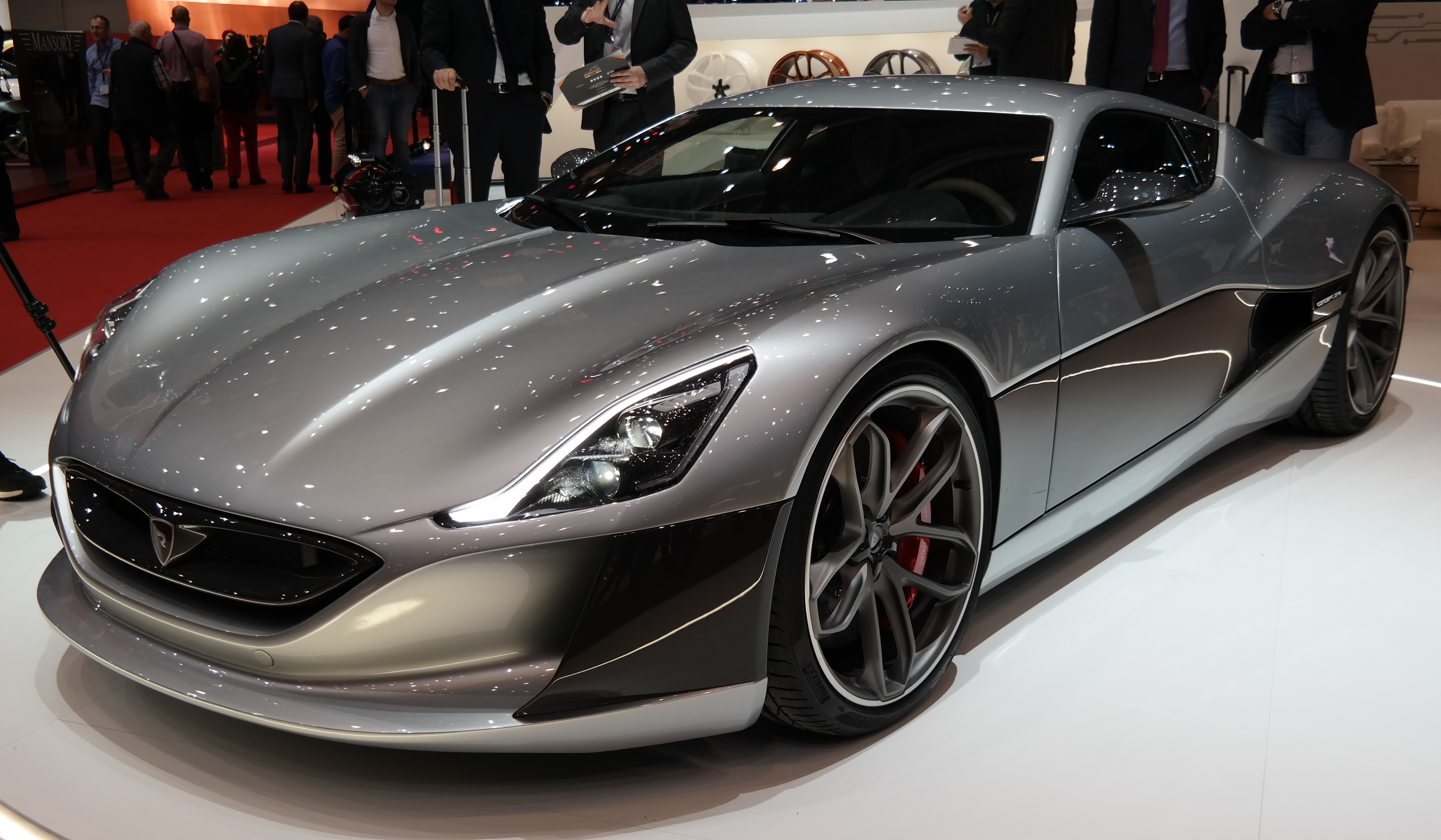
Rimac Concept One

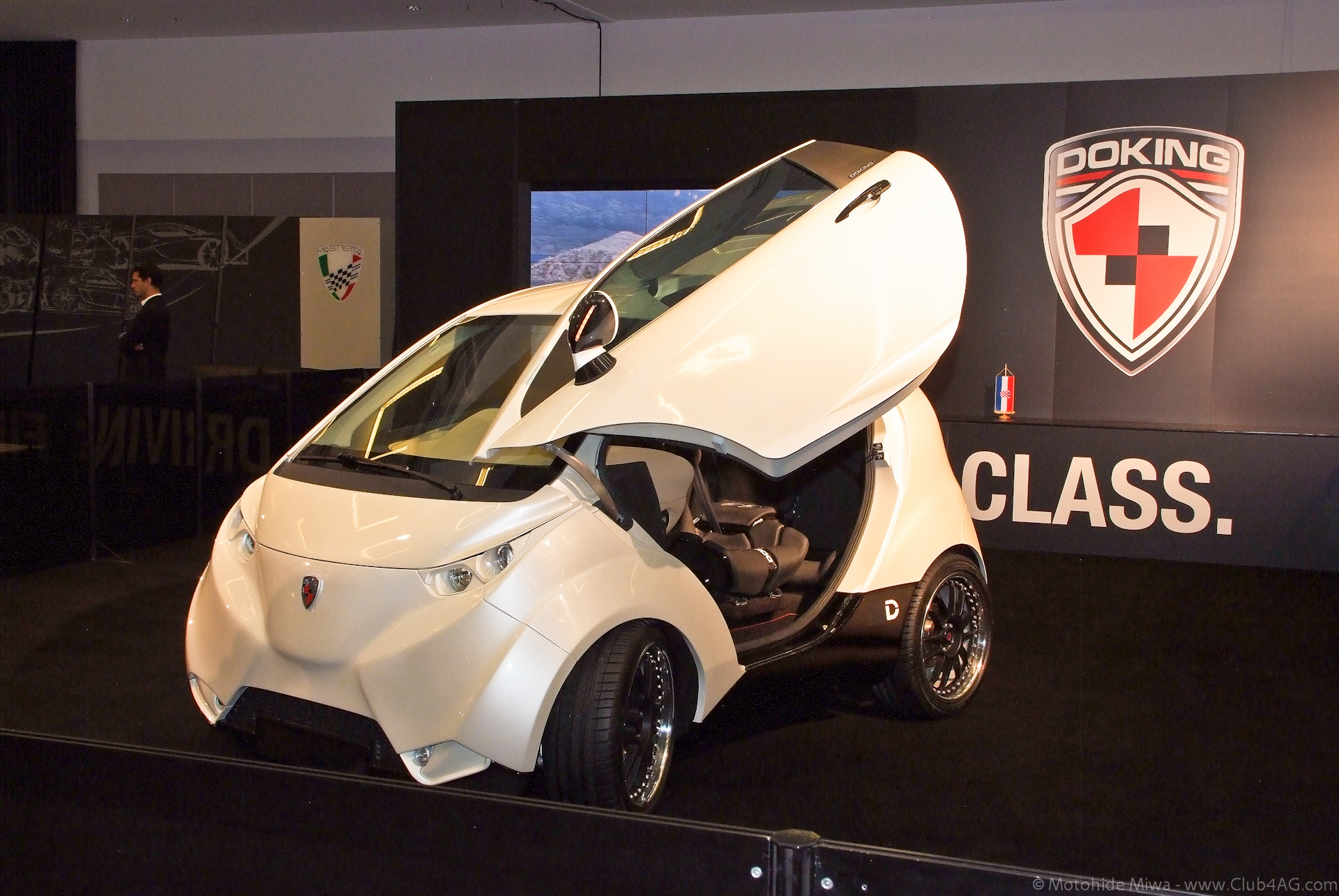
Doking XD

The automotive industry in Croatia employs about 10,000 people in over 130 companies and generates profit of about US$600 million. Croatia mostly produces automotive parts and software. Two most prominent car manufacturers in Croatia are DOK-ING and Rimac Automobili, while Crobus produces buses. The automotive industry accounts for approximately 1.8 per cent of all Croatian exports, while 90 per cent of profits in the industry itself are derived from exports.

Automotive parts manufacturers in Croatia are well-integrated into the global parts supply chain, such as AD Plastik, which produces for Volkswagen.

Croatia entered late into the automotive industry and its primary focus has been on the development of luxury grade electric automobiles and supercars. The Rimac Concept One is one of the world's first electric supercars.

=== Czechia ===
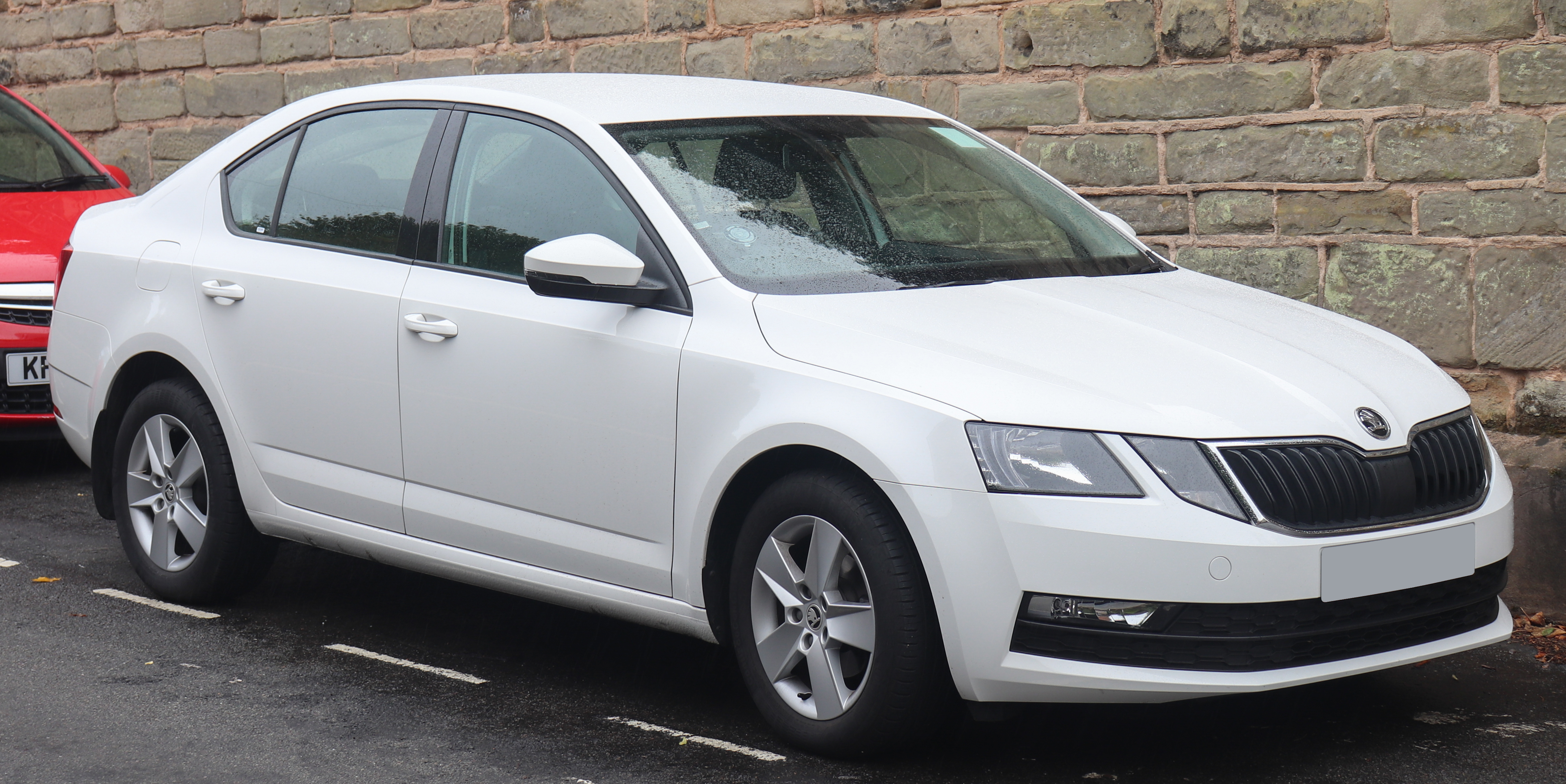
Škoda Octavia

Automobile manufacturing in the Czech lands dates to 1897, when the predecessor of Tatra built the Präsident in Kopřivnice. Laurin & Klement, the predecessor of Škoda Auto, began producing cars in Mladá Boleslav in 1905. The Tatra 77, introduced in 1934, was an early production car designed around aerodynamic principles. Škoda joined the Volkswagen Group in 1991.

The main passenger-car manufacturers are Škoda Auto, Hyundai Motor Manufacturing Czech in Nošovice, and Toyota Motor Manufacturing Czech Republic in Kolín. The Kolín plant began production in 2005 as a joint venture between Toyota and PSA Group; Toyota took full ownership in January 2021. Hyundai began production in Nošovice in November 2008.

In 2025, the Czech Republic produced 1,445,776 passenger cars, more than 92.5% of which were exported. Battery-electric cars and plug-in hybrids together accounted for 19.7% of passenger-car production. The country ranked fourth in Europe and twelfth worldwide in 2025. It ranked second worldwide in passenger-car production per capita.

The country also produces commercial vehicles. Tatra Trucks manufactures trucks, while Iveco Czech Republic in Vysoké Mýto and SOR Libchavy manufacture buses. They produced combined 5,651 busses in 2025, and the country had the world's highest bus production per capita.

=== Finland ===
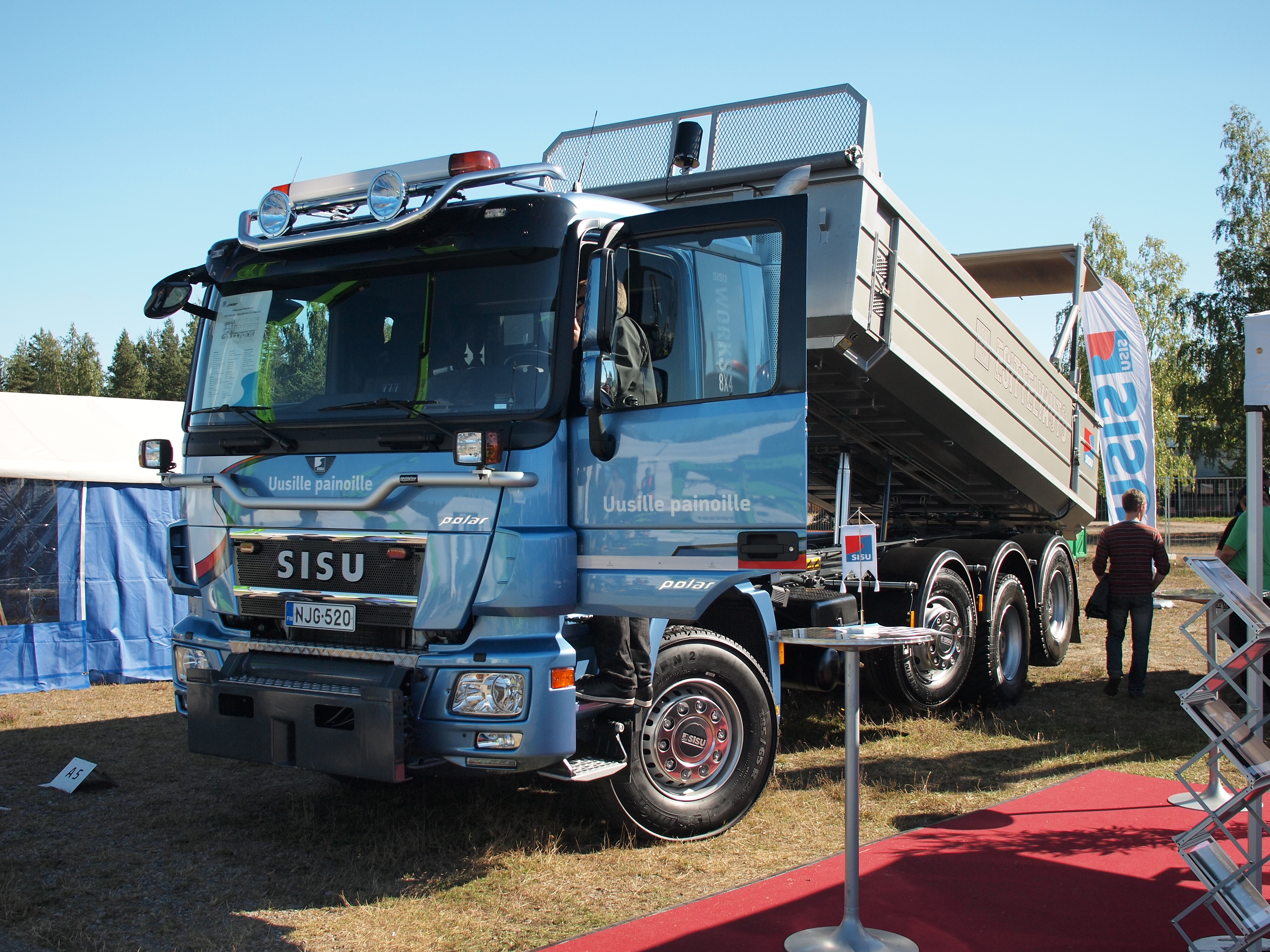
Sisu Polar

Finland depends on imports of cars and other vehicles, it does however have its own (yet small) auto industry which includes the production of Valmet Automotive cars, Sisu trucks and buses/coaches of various producers. This has decreased from forty to around a few thousand since the end of the 20th century.

The Valmet Automotive -plant in Uusikaupunki produces over 100.000 cars annually, currently Mercedes-Benz A-series and GLC -series.

Finland has had at least over 90 bus manufacturers (list in Finnish), though most of them were tiny and short-lived, or even the bus operators' own construction. Two of these (Sisu and Vanaja) were chassis manufacturers, a few (such as Kabus) manufactured complete buses, while most of them built bodywork for buses (and sometimes for bookmobiles and retail vehicles).

=== France ===
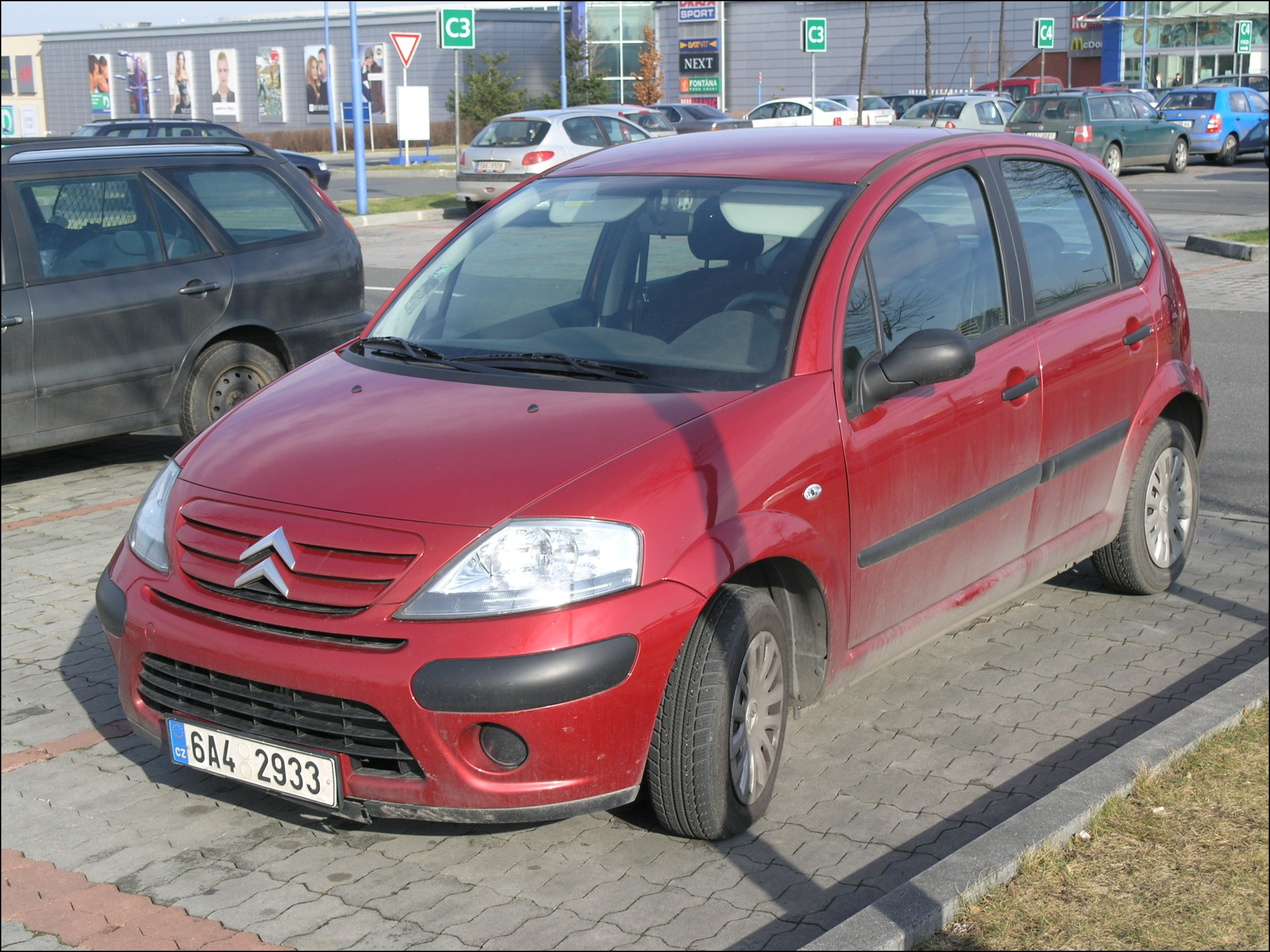
Citroen C3

France was among the earliest pioneers in auto production. Armand Peugeot (along with Léon Serpollet) produced a three-wheeled steam-powered car in 1889, and produced a four-wheeled car powered by a Daimler gasoline internal combustion engine in 1890.

The two main automotive manufacturers in France are PSA Group, makers of Peugeot and Citroen, and Renault, which makes Renault and Dacia (in Romania). In 1975, Peugeot acquired Citroen, and formed PSA Peugeot Citroën. Three years later, the company acquired Chrysler's European division, the former Rootes and Simca auto manufacturers. Renault, which was founded in 1899 and state-owned between 1945 and 1996, temporarily was in alliance with Volvo and then has been the controlling shareholder of Nissan since 1999. Renault also had a controlling interest in American Motors Corporation during the 1970s and 1980s. The other major vehicle manufacturer in France is Renault Trucks, which is primarily owned by Volvo.

Other auto manufacturers that were active after World War II included: Alpine, Facel Vega, Matra, Panhard (bought out by Citroen), Rosengart and Vespa. After the war, luxury carmakers were hampered by the taxes based on the fiscal horsepower rating, or CV, which doomed the grandes routières such as Bugatti, Delage, Delahaye, Hotchkiss, Salmson and Talbot-Lago (purchased by Simca).

At the end of the 20th century, France was the second largest European (slightly lagging behind Germany) and world's fourth largest auto maker, having an annual production of 3.5–4 million. Due to strong competition from Spain and European imports from Asian, Eastern European, Turkish and other producers, last years output decreased to 2.2-2.3 million and third place in Europe (after Germany and Spain) and tenth in the world.

=== Germany ===
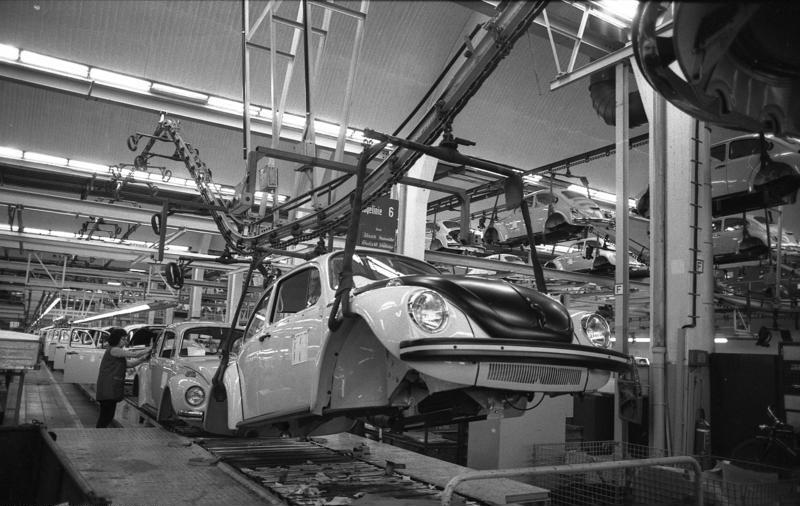
Volkswagen assembly line, Wolfsburg, in 1973

The petrol engined automobile was invented in Germany by Karl Benz. Furthermore, the four-stroke internal combustion engine used in most automobiles worldwide today was invented by Nicolaus Otto in Germany. In addition, the diesel engine was also invented by German Rudolf Diesel.

Germany is famous for the high-performance and high-quality sports cars made by Porsche, and the cars of Mercedes, Audi and BMW are famous for their quality and technological innovation. Daimler-Benz's predecessor Daimler-Motoren-Gesellschaft was the industry's oldest firm, Daimler-Benz company dates from 1926. In 1998, it bought the American automobile manufacturer Chrysler, then sold out in 2007 at a heavy loss, as it never managed to bring the division to long term profitability.

In the popular market, Opel and Volkswagen are most well known. Opel was a bicycle company that started making cars in 1899; General Motors bought it out in 1929, but the Nazi government took control, and GM wrote off its entire investment. In 1948, GM returned and restored the Opel brand. Volkswagen is dominant in the popular market; it purchased Audi in 1964, which eventually led to the formation of today's Volkswagen Group. Volkswagen's most famous car was the small, beetle-shaped economical "people's car", with a rear-mounted, air-cooled engine. It was designed in the 1930s by Ferdinand Porsche upon orders from Adolf Hitler, who was himself a car enthusiast. However, production models only appeared after the war; until then, only rich Germans had automobiles. By 1950, Volkswagen was the largest German automobile producer. Today, the Group is one of the three biggest automotive companies in the world, and the largest in Europe; and is now part-owned by Porsche Automobil Holding SE. As of 2010, seven different car manufacturers belong to the industrial concern: Volkswagen, Audi AG, Bugatti Automobiles SAS, Automobili Lamborghini S.p.A., Bentley Motors Limited, SEAT, S.A., Škoda Auto, along with commercial vehicle makers Volkswagen Commercial Vehicles, MAN AG and Scania AB. During German reunification West Germany incorporated non-large (near 200 thousands per year) production of Wartburg, Trabant cars and IFA trucks in East Germany.

With annual output near 6 million now, Germany has been the leader of auto production in Europe since the 1960s, and was the third largest in the world during the 1970s – middle of the 2000s. It's now the fourth largest manufacturer (behind China, the United States and Japan).

=== Greece ===
Although over 100 (mainly bus) body manufacturers have been recorded in Greece since 1903, until 1960 there was only small-scale, or occasional "complete" (chassis and body) vehicle manufacture in the country. Thereafter, production of complete vehicles mainly concentrated in commercial vehicles (with production increasing as local type certification laws were made more flexible), while passenger car assembly plants with notable production volumes operated after 1970. Most of the assembly plants were located in the industrial areas of Volos and Athens (assembly of Opel Kadett, Alfa Romeo Alfasud, 45 different models od Datsun/Nissan, Mazda 323 etc.). During the 1970s and 1980s a generation of multi-purpose vehicles were locally developed. According to the Statistical Yearbook of the Greek National Statistical Service (ESYE), annual production of all types of vehicles, including assembled cars, remained close to 20,000 units between 1980 and 1990. By 1992 all major assembly lines had ceased operations and, since then, there has been no large-scale production (current producers include ELVO, Replicar Hellas, and Keraboss).

=== Hungary ===
Some original car production in the Hungarian part of Austro-Hungary at the beginning of the 20th century was lost. Post WWII socialist Hungary widely imported cars and trucks from Soviet Union and other countries. At the same time Hungary produced small number of heavy trucks (Rába) and had strong specialization in Soviet bloc in manufacturing of buses (Ikarus), that made it one of the largest bus producers and exporters (including outside Soviet bloc and Europe). The Ganz Works, also a long lived Hungarian company, has been manufacturing engines, wagons specialized for electric railway equipment.

Post-socialist Hungary significantly decreased the manufacturing of buses but found a large assembly capacities of foreign brands (such as Mercedes, Suzuki, Audi, BMW and Opel) with annual production of more than 400 thousands cars.

=== Ireland ===
The Irish industry in Ireland has a varied history and despite the small size of the island, a punitive tax on imported cars encouraged a wide range of companies to assemble their cars locally including Fiat, Ford and Renault. Following Ireland's entry to the European Union in 1973, the need for locally produced cars to avoid import taxes reduced, and since the 1980s, production ended and all cars are now imported.

=== Italy ===
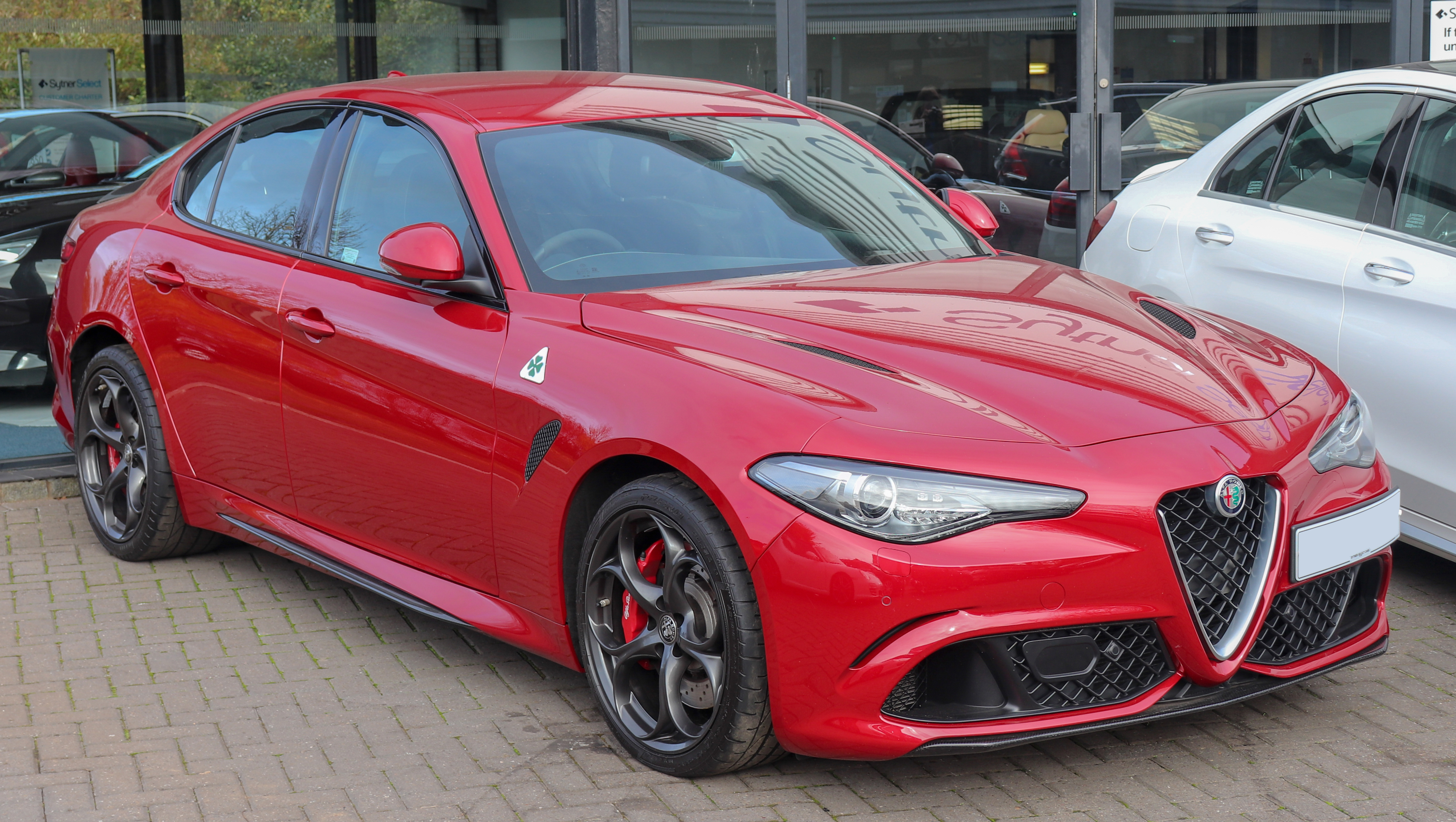
Alfa Romeo Giulia Quadrifoglio

The automotive industry in Italy began with the construction of the first FIAT plant (Fabbrica Italiana Automobili Torino) in 1899 by Giovanni Agnelli. In the following years at least 50 other manufacturers appeared, the best known being Isotta Fraschini in 1900, Lancia in 1906, Alfa Romeo in 1910, Maserati in 1914, Ferrari in 1939, Lamborghini in 1963, Pagani in 1999, Mazzanti in 2002, Spada Vetture Sport in 2008 and DR Motor Company in 2006. During the first and the second World Wars and the economic crisis of the 70's, many of these brands disappeared or were bought by FIAT or foreign manufacturers.

To 1960s–1970s Italy restored own large auto industry that was 3rd-4th in Europe and 5th–6th in the World. In the 1980s Italy overtook the United Kingdom but has conceded to Soviet Union that, like Poland and Yugoslavia, found large-volume production of cars by Italian FIAT help. In the 1990s Italian auto industry became again 3rd in Europe and 5th in World with annual output more than 2 million. But in the 21st century it seriously fallen to near 800 thousand per year and 8th place in Europe and 21st place in the world.

Today, the Italian automotive industry continues to boast a wide range of products, from very compact city cars to sport supercars such as Ferrari and Pagani. As of July 2011 Fiat also holds roughly 53.5% stake in the American automaker Chrysler.

=== Netherlands ===
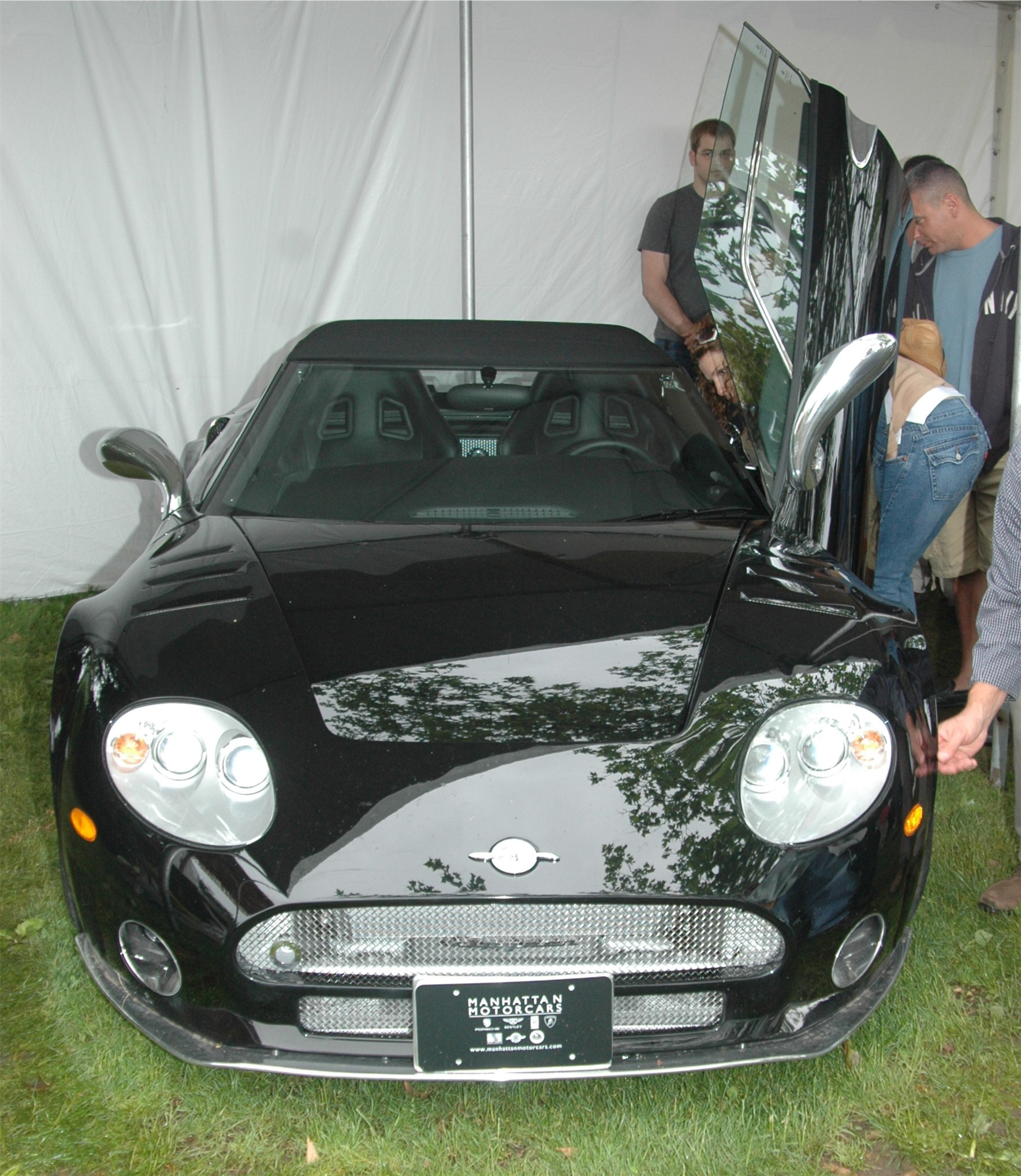
Spyker C8 in Amsterdam

The Netherlands imports most of its vehicles, having little own manufacturing of less than 200,000 per year. Besides DAF Trucks and VDL buses, present Dutch auto production consists primarily of contract manufacturing for BMW and Mini by VDL Nedcar (formerly producing DAF, Volvo, Smart and Mitsubishi), plus a few small sports car companies: Spyker Cars and Donkervoort. Another small company, PAL-V International, is now taking orders for production of a roadable gyrocopter, slated for deliveries in 2019.

=== Poland ===
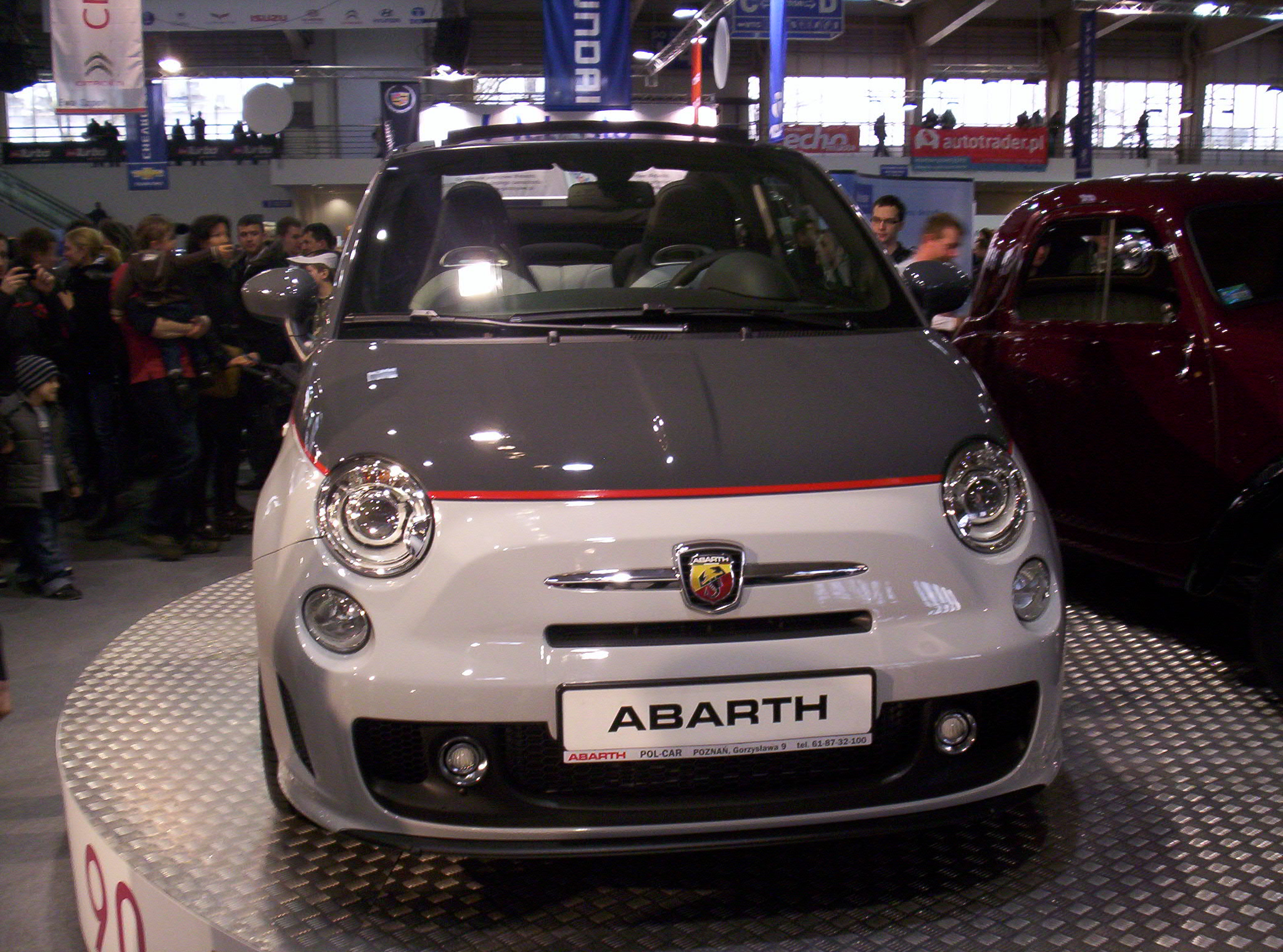
Fiat Abarth 500C

Poland is the third largest producer of passenger cars in Visegrád Group, after the Czech Republic and Slovakia. As of the late 2009s and 2010s, Polish automotive sector represents arounds 11% of total industrial production, accounting for about 4% of GDP. The sector employs about 130,000 people, and produced about 800,000-900,000 light vehicles a year. Production of larger commercial vehicles was at about 70,000-90,000 in that period. Most of the sector's output is geared for exports, primarily to the European Union. In 2009 the value of exports from this sector was €15.7 billion, i.e. 16% of all Polish exports.

Currently domestic producers include supercar manufacturers Arrinera, bus manufacturers Autosan, Solbus and Solaris. International manufacturers include Opel and Fiat. Poland also accounts for the majority of Abarth cars, a performance brand of Fiat.

=== Portugal ===
Portugal assembles foreign cars and trucks with production of nearly 200,000 annually including Volkswagen's AutoEuropa factory and PSA Group. It has a history of vehicle manufacturing, including the design of light vehicles of brands such as the UMM and Portaro.

=== Romania ===
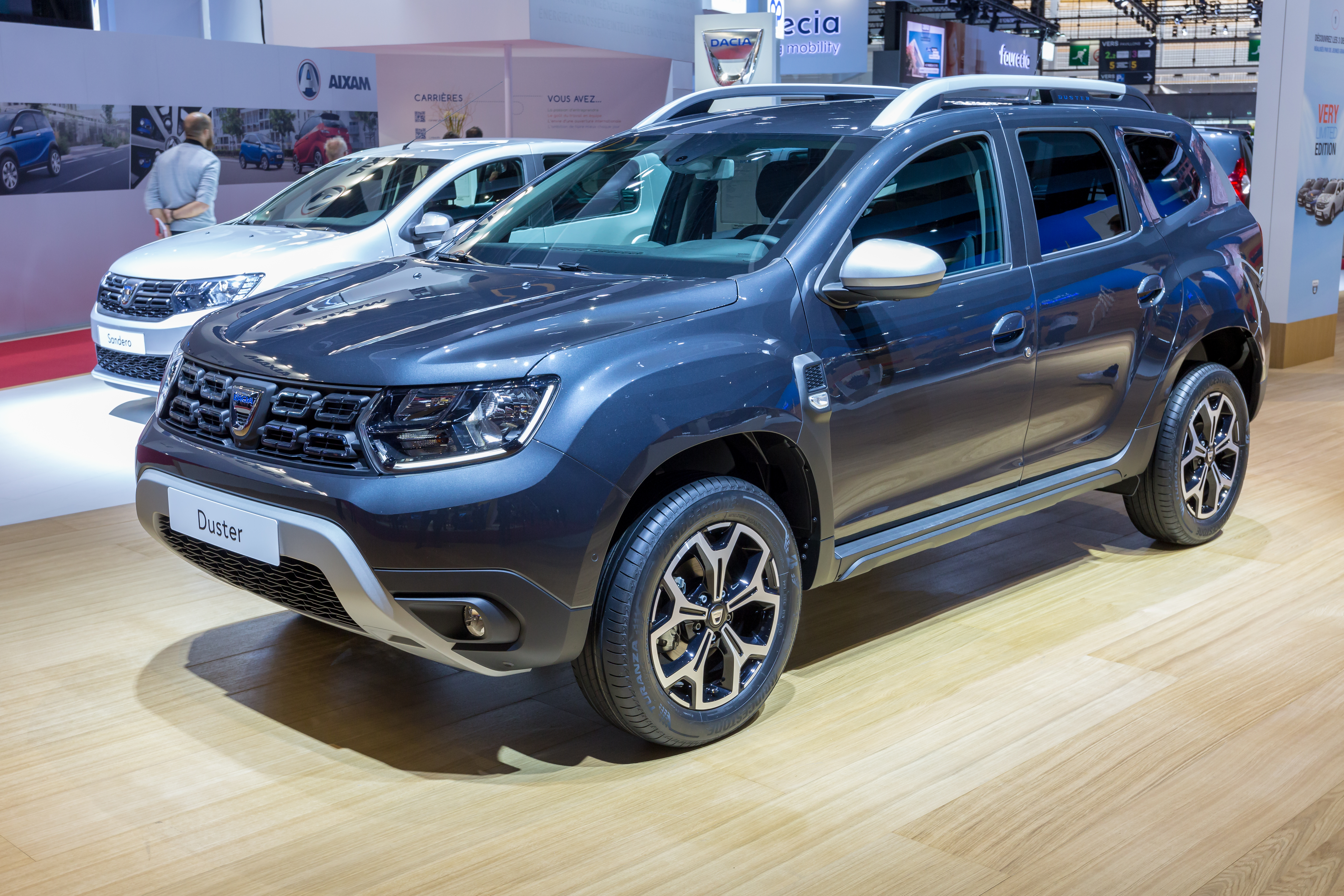
Dacia Duster

During the Communist period, Romania was one of the largest automobile producers in Central and Eastern Europe.

Now Romanian automobile manufacturing produces more than 500 thousand vehicles per year and includes Dacia, Griviţa, Igero, Roman and Ford (the former Daewoo and Oltcit manufacturing facility). Other companies such as ARO, Rocar, Oltcit and Tractorul also existed, but they went bankrupt in the 1990s.

In 2018, the Romanian automotive industry ranks third in Central and Eastern Europe, behind that of the Czech Republic, Slovakia, recently surpassing Hungary and Poland.

=== Russia ===
Russia has inherited a main part of automotive industry of the Soviet Union with near 1.8 million annual production of all types of automobiles in RSFSR.

Automotive production is a significant industry in post-Soviet Russia, directly employing around 600,000 people or 1% of the country's total work force. With output of more than 2 million, Russia was the world's 11th and European 2nd (after Germany) automotive largest producer in 2012, and accounts for about 7% of the worldwide production. Due to the 2008 financial crisis, in 2009, the industry produced 600,000 vehicles, down from 1.5 million in 2008 after post-Soviet restoration.

The largest companies are light vehicle producers AvtoVAZ and GAZ, while KAMAZ is the leading heavy vehicle producer. 11 foreign carmakers have production operations or are constructing plants in Russia. Russian government presented plans to make Russia as European second automotive producer. As of August 2012 Russia is the largest car market in Europe.

=== Serbia ===
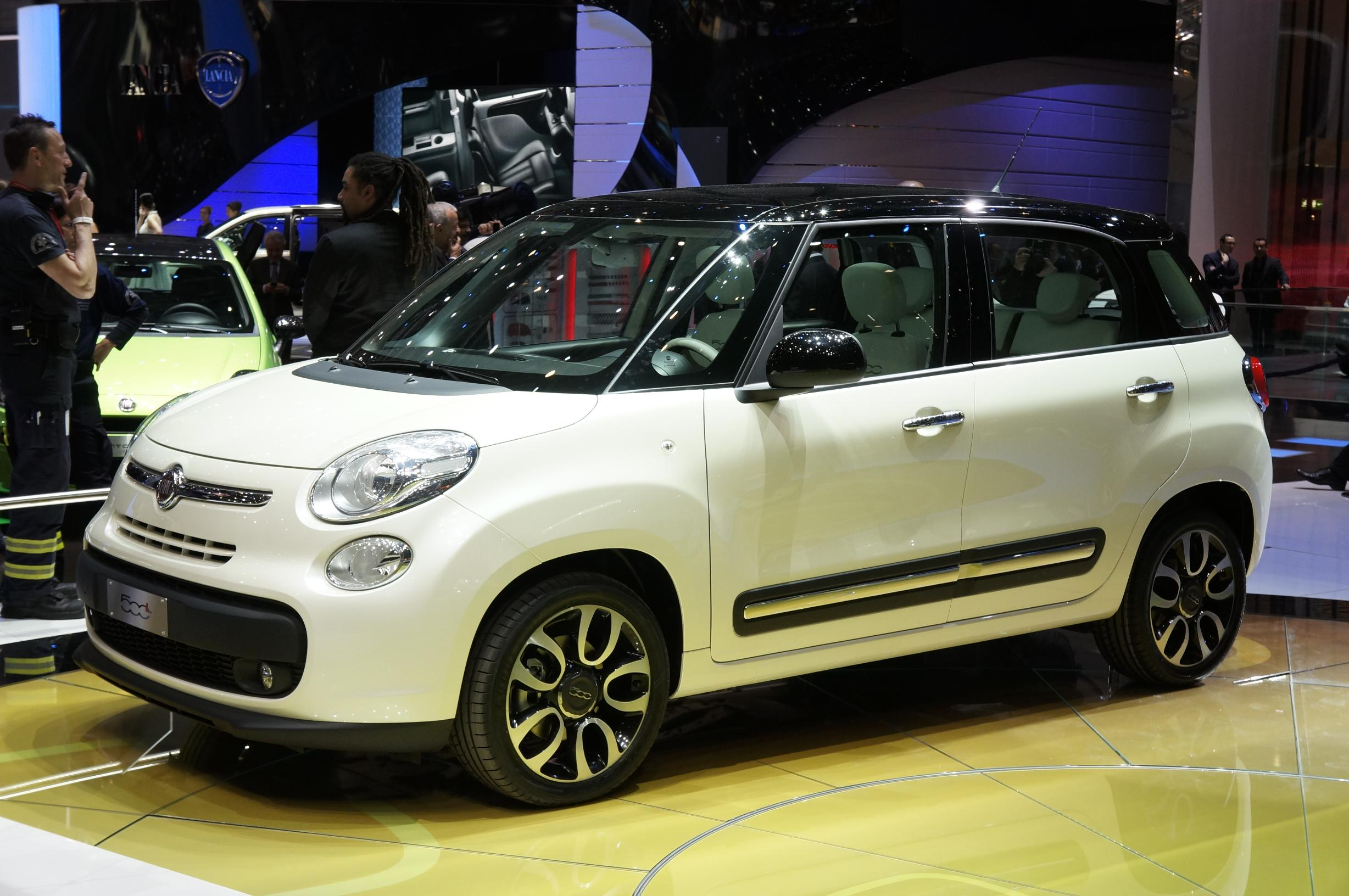
The Fiat 500L is manufactured in Kragujevac.

The automotive industry in Serbia and Yugoslavia dates back to 1939 when the first trucks came out of the assembly lines in the city of Kragujevac. After the Second World War this factory was renamed Zastava Automobiles and the production of motor vehicles started again under license to FIAT. Yugoslavia was 2nd (after Poland) European socialist auto maker outside Soviet Union and achieved at high point near 300 thousands annual production, 250 thousands amongst that was Zastava cars. Zastava cars were exported by small quantities to 70 countries all over the world, including the UK. With the Yugo small car, Yugoslavia undertook wide adverted intervention to US automarket and tried to compete with Japanese analogs in the small car sector that opened after the oil crisis of the mid-1970s.

During the 1990s, the political problems and economic sanctions imposed on Serbia, inherited by the Yugoslavian auto industry mainly, halted the drop of production of Zastava cars to just 10–20,000 per year. In 2008, in agreement with Government of Serbia, FIAT Group took over the Zastava plant which is now one of FIAT factories. The Serbian Government wants to establish Serbia as a new manufacturing location for the automotive industry in Europe and is strongly supporting all the international producers and suppliers in order to open their plants in Serbia. New Fiat model 500L and 500XL will have estimated production between 200,000 and 300,000 in 2013,

=== Slovakia ===
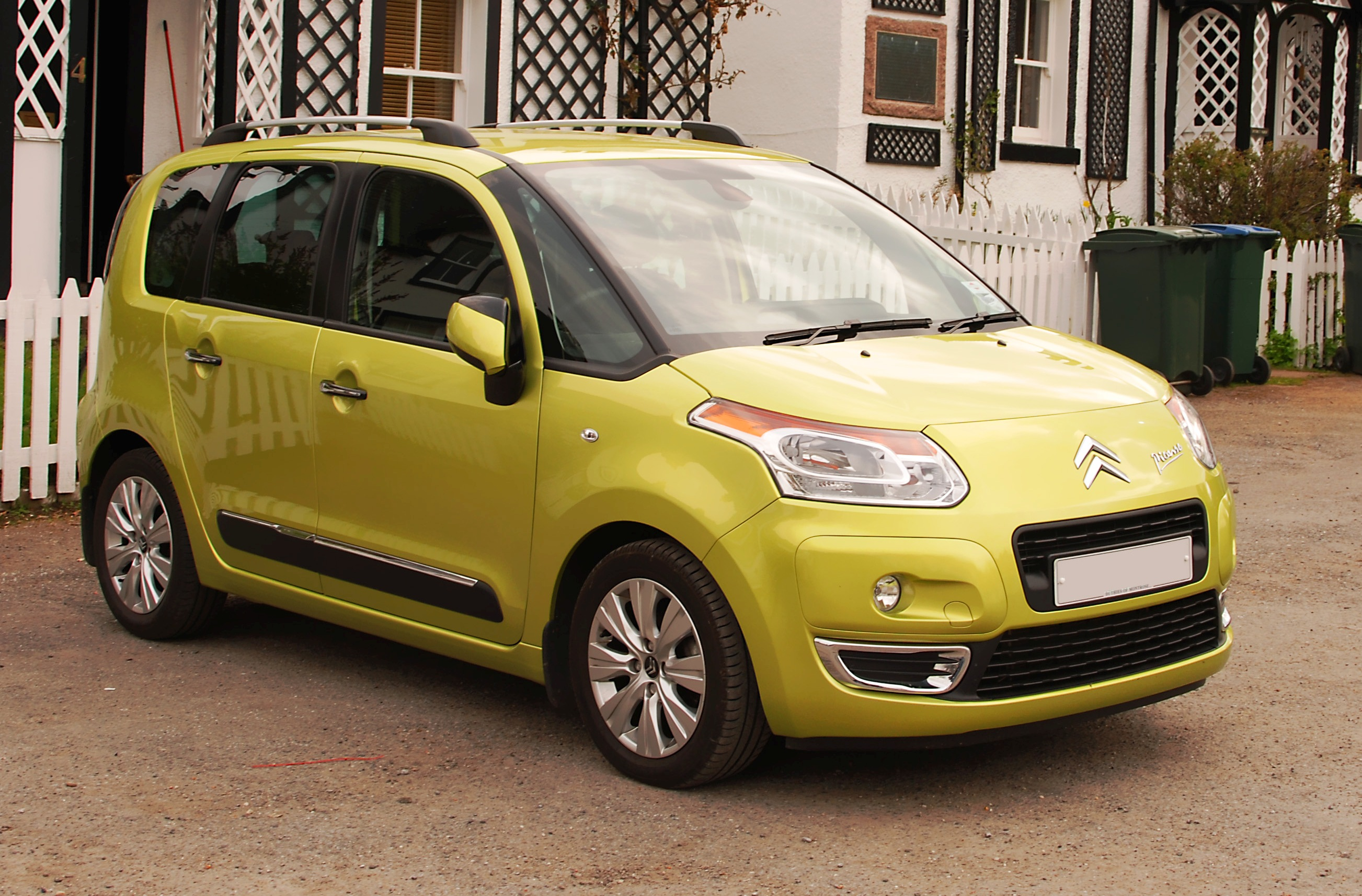
Citroën C3 Picasso is now produced in Trnava, Slovakia.

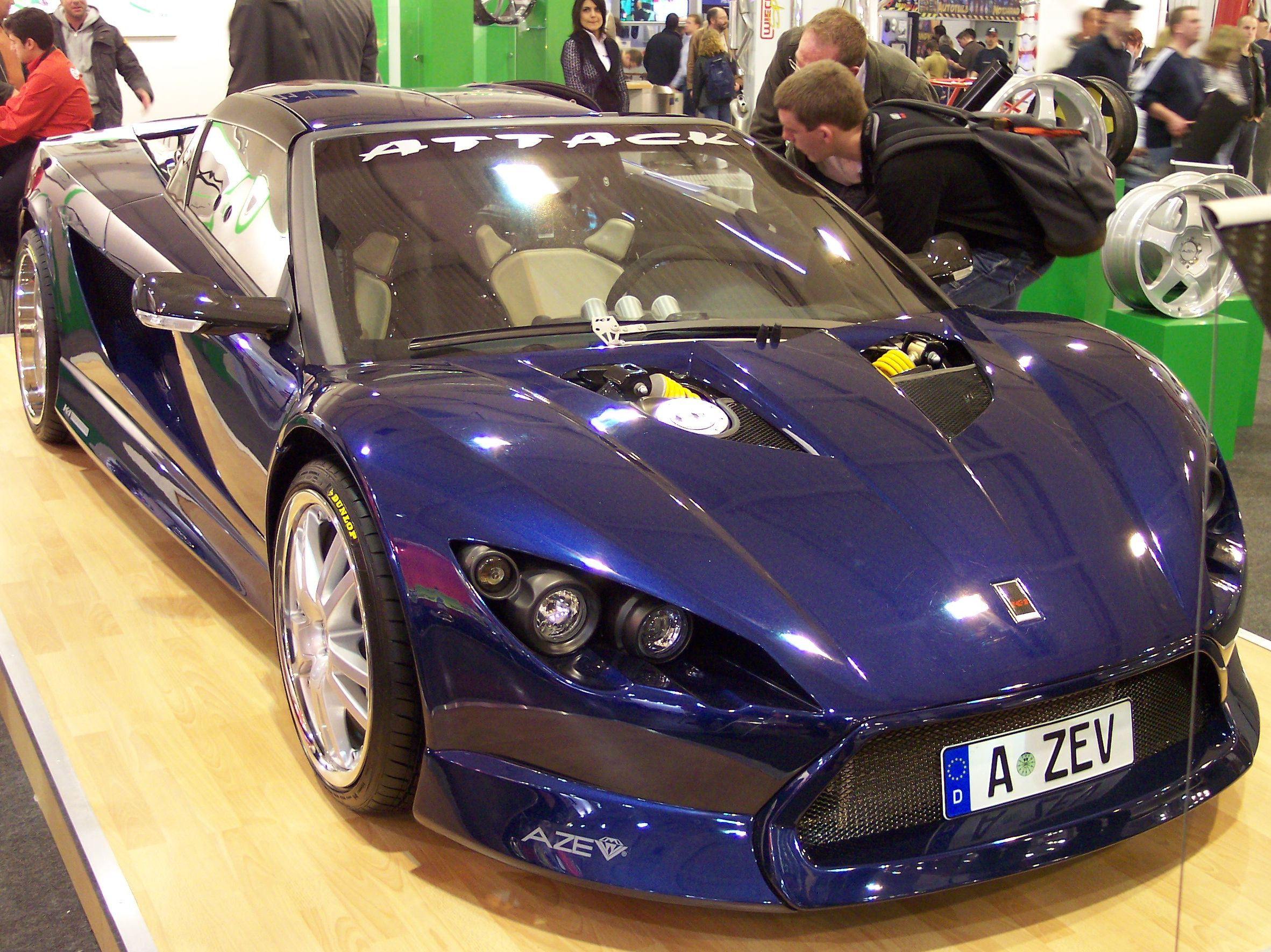
K-1 Attack from Slovakia

Slovakia had very little automotive industry as part of Czechoslovakia. After dissolution of the federation, new car assembly plants were built by foreign companies in Slovakia as in other countries in central Europe. Auto manufacturers in the Slovakia currently include 3 OEM automobile production plants: Volkswagen's in Bratislava, PSA Peugeot Citroën's in Trnava and Kia Motors' Žilina Plant. Since 2007, Slovakia has been the world's largest producer of cars per capita, with a total of 571,071 cars manufactured in the 2007 alone in a country with 5 million people.

Over time this placed it at top spot in car production per capita worldwide by 2013 with a yearly production of over 980,000 vehicles.

With this production in 2013 was Slovakia 18th in the list of worldwide car production by country. Automotive is the largest industry in Slovakia with a share of 12% on the Slovak GDP in 2013 which was 41% of industrial production and 26% of Slovakia export. 80 000 people were directly employed in the automotive industry in 2014. This number will be even increased when Jaguar Land Rover starts production in Nitra in 2018.

=== Slovenia ===
Having some small auto production in socialist Yugoslavia, Slovenia became one of the new Central European car making countries and now produces near 200,000 per year, mainly for export.

=== Spain ===
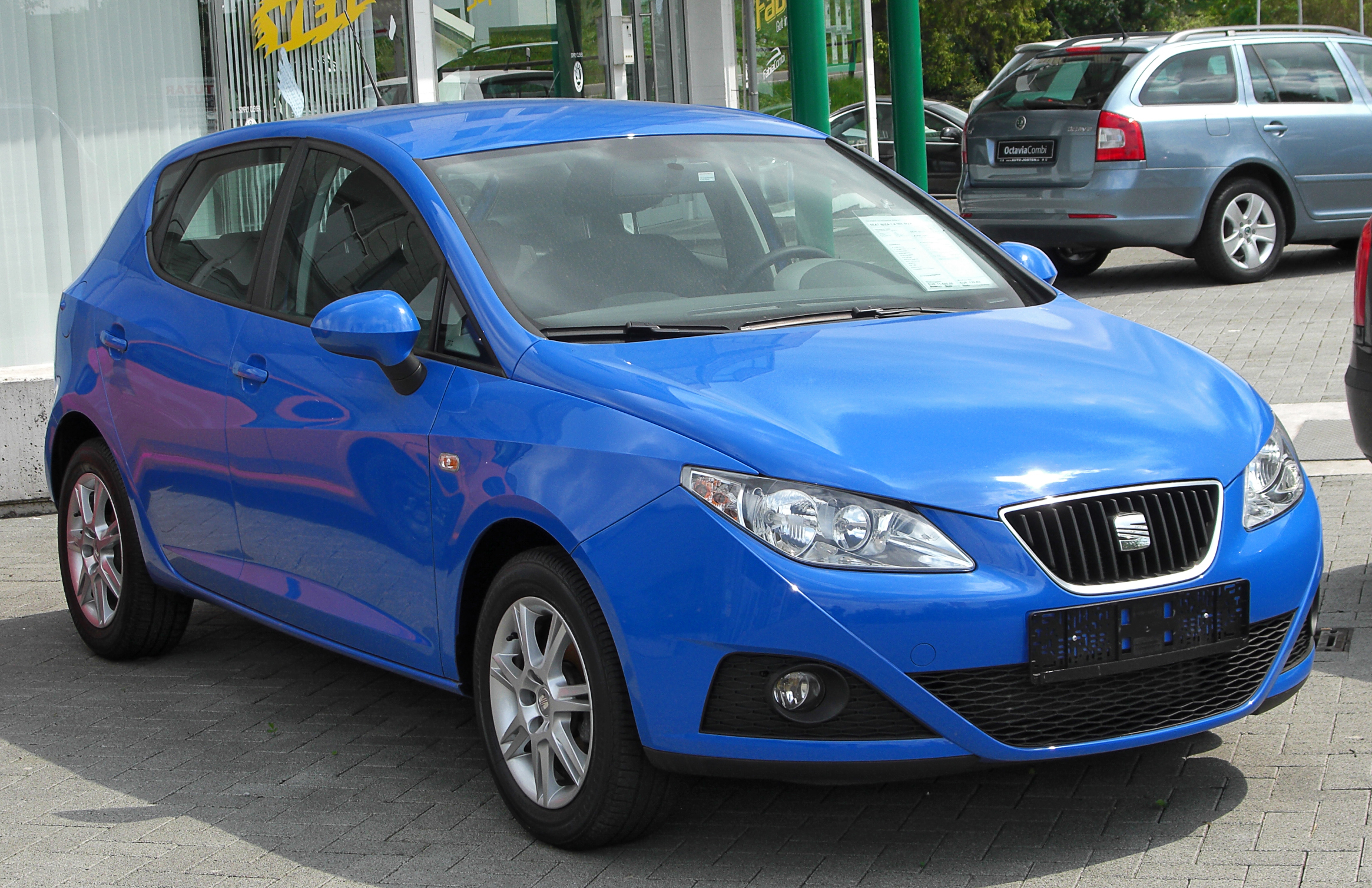
SEAT Ibiza

After WWII, Franco's Spain lagged behind main European auto manufacturing countries for decades. Only at the end of the 1970s it was able to produce more than one million vehicles and was 5th in Europe and 9th in the world. Then significant growth allows Spain to overtake the United Kingdom, Italy and achieve the 3 million output (for export partially), 3rd place in Europe, 6th place in the World at 2000. Since that time, due to East-European and Asian competitors on European market, auto exports from Spain have slowed and annual production decreased to 2.4 million, although Spain beat France and became the second auto power in Europe (after Germany) but 9th in the world.

In 2009, the automotive industry generated 3.5 percent of the country's GDP and gave employment to about nine percent of the working population. Spain is in eighth place in car manufacturing countries, but 2008 and 2009 showed a decrease in car production. The downward spiral started about ten years ago, with an abandoning policy of many consecutive governments. The result has been the loss of all Spanish car brands manufacturers, which are now in hands of foreign companies. Nowadays, Spain's major domestic firm is the Volkswagen Group's subsidiary brand SEAT, S.A.

=== Sweden ===
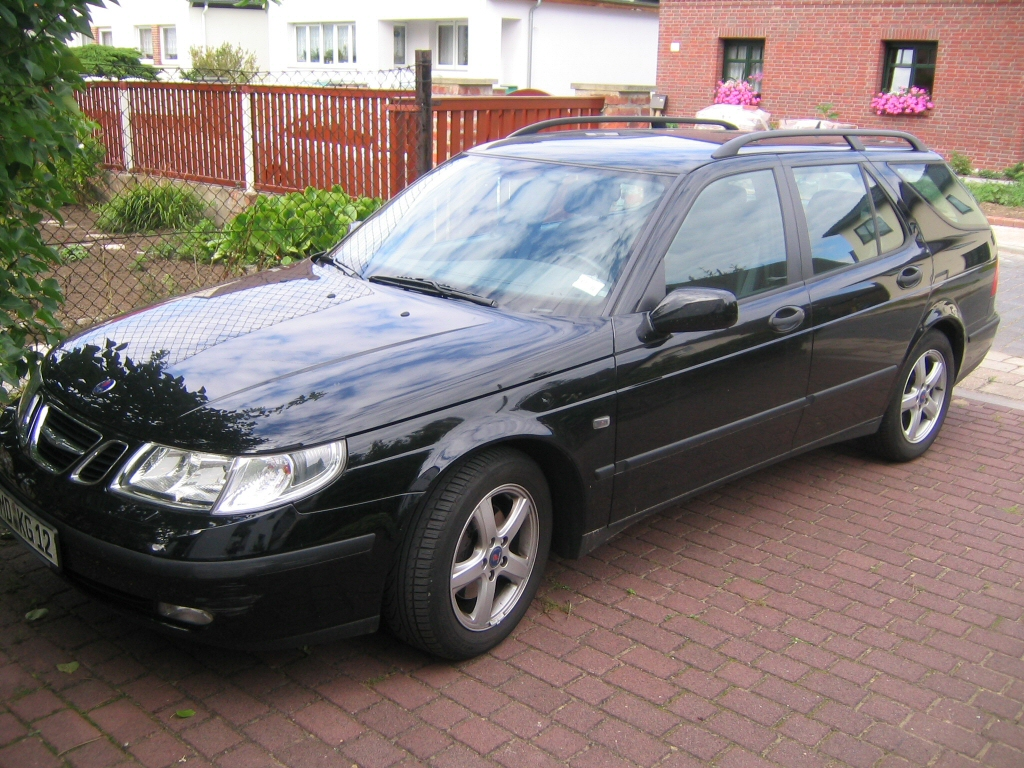
Saab 9-5 Combi in Sweden

Swedish automobile manufacturing is widely known in European and US markets due to advanced and safe cars including Saab and Volvo brands, although their production (150–200 thousand per year) is not among the largest in Europe and the world.

=== Turkey ===
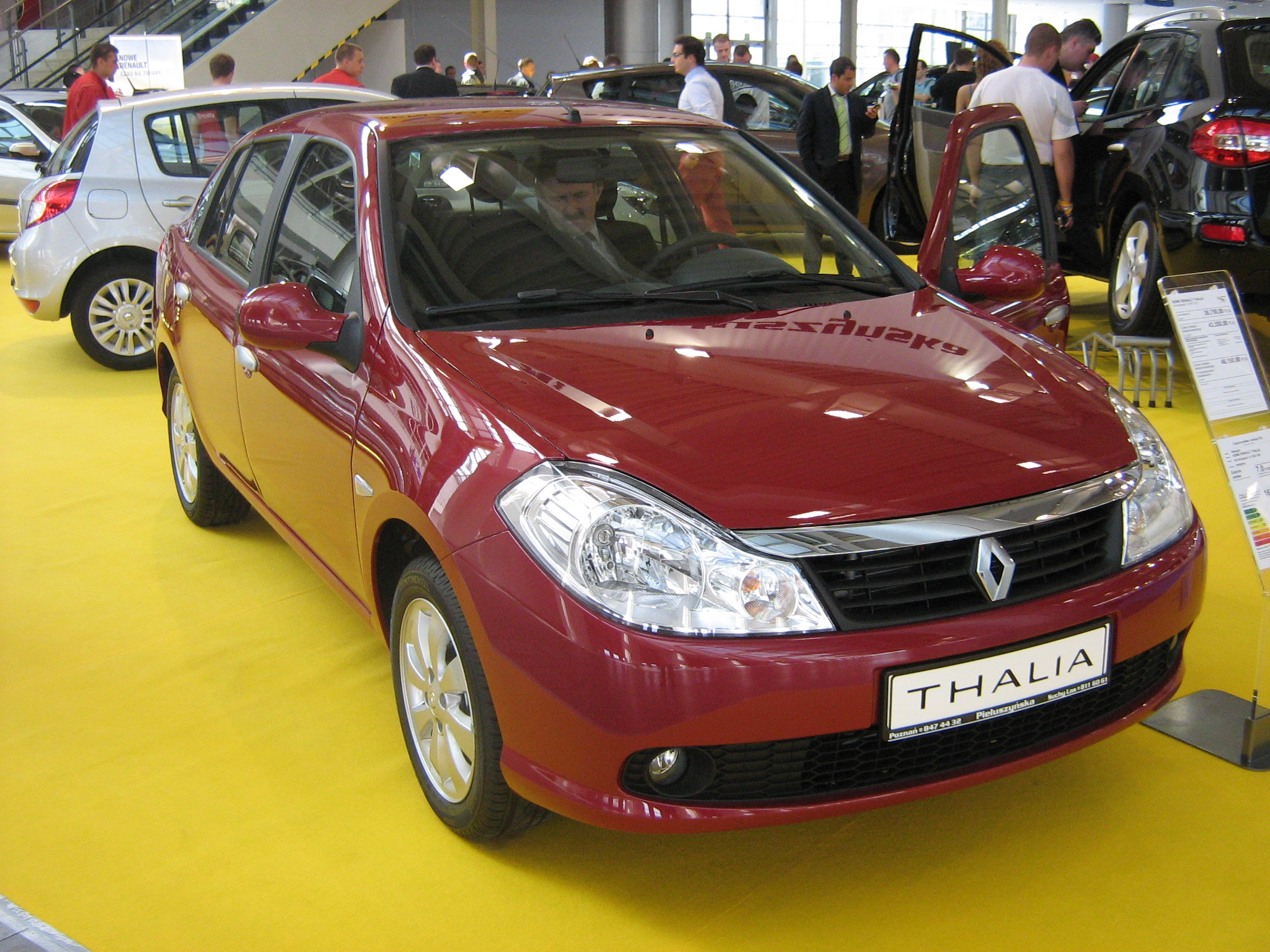
Renault Symbol manufactured at Oyak-Renault

Recently fast growing with European and then Japanese and South Korean help, the automotive industry in Turkey plays an important role in the manufacturing sector of the Turkish economy. The foundations of the industry was laid with the establishment of Otosan assembly factory in 1959 and the mass production of the domestic car Anadol in 1961. Last years Turkey produced up to 1.2 million motor vehicles, ranking as the 7th in Europe and the 16th-17th largest producer in the World. With a cluster of car-makers and parts suppliers, the Turkish automotive sector has become an integral part of the global network of production bases, exporting over $22,944,000,000 worth of motor vehicles and components in 2008. Global car manufacturers with production plants include Mercedes-Benz, Fiat/Tofaş, Oyak-Renault, Hyundai, Toyota, Honda and Ford/Otosan.

Turkey's national automotive brand TOGG also started production in 2022.

=== Ukraine ===
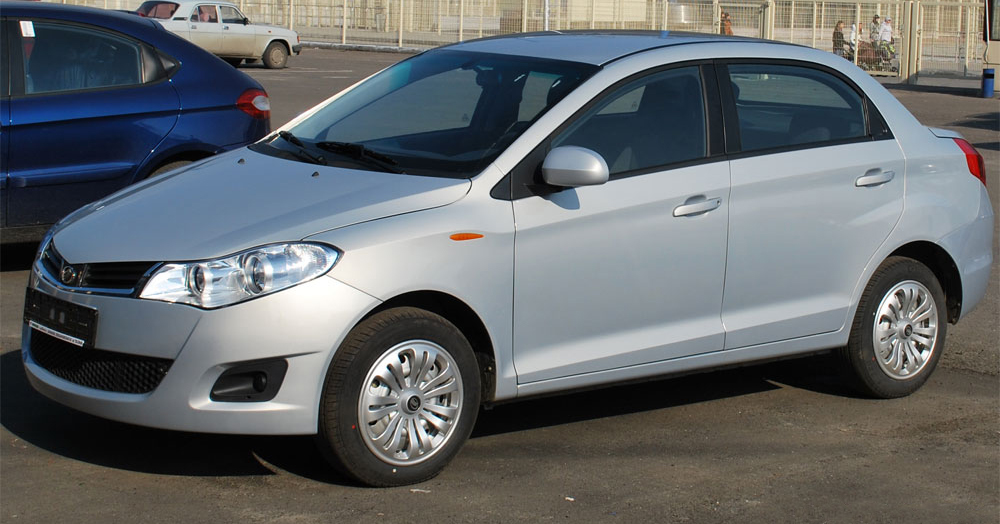
ZAZ Forza

Ukraine was one of two only Soviet republics having production of all types of automobiles and was second by volume in the automotive industry of the Soviet Union with more than 200,000 annual production.

Ukraine automobile manufacturers produces 100–200 thousand per year now and includes UkrAvto (ZAZ, MeMZ), Bogdan (Bogdan Motors), KrAZ, KrASZ, BAZ, ChAZ, Electron, Eurocar, Etalon-Avto, HalAZ, Anto-Rus and LAZ. While domestic trucks, buses and trolleybuses continues to be made, production of self-designed cars (such as ZAZ Tavria) decreased and now Ukraine assembles mainly Europe-, China- and South Korea-developed cars.

=== United Kingdom ===
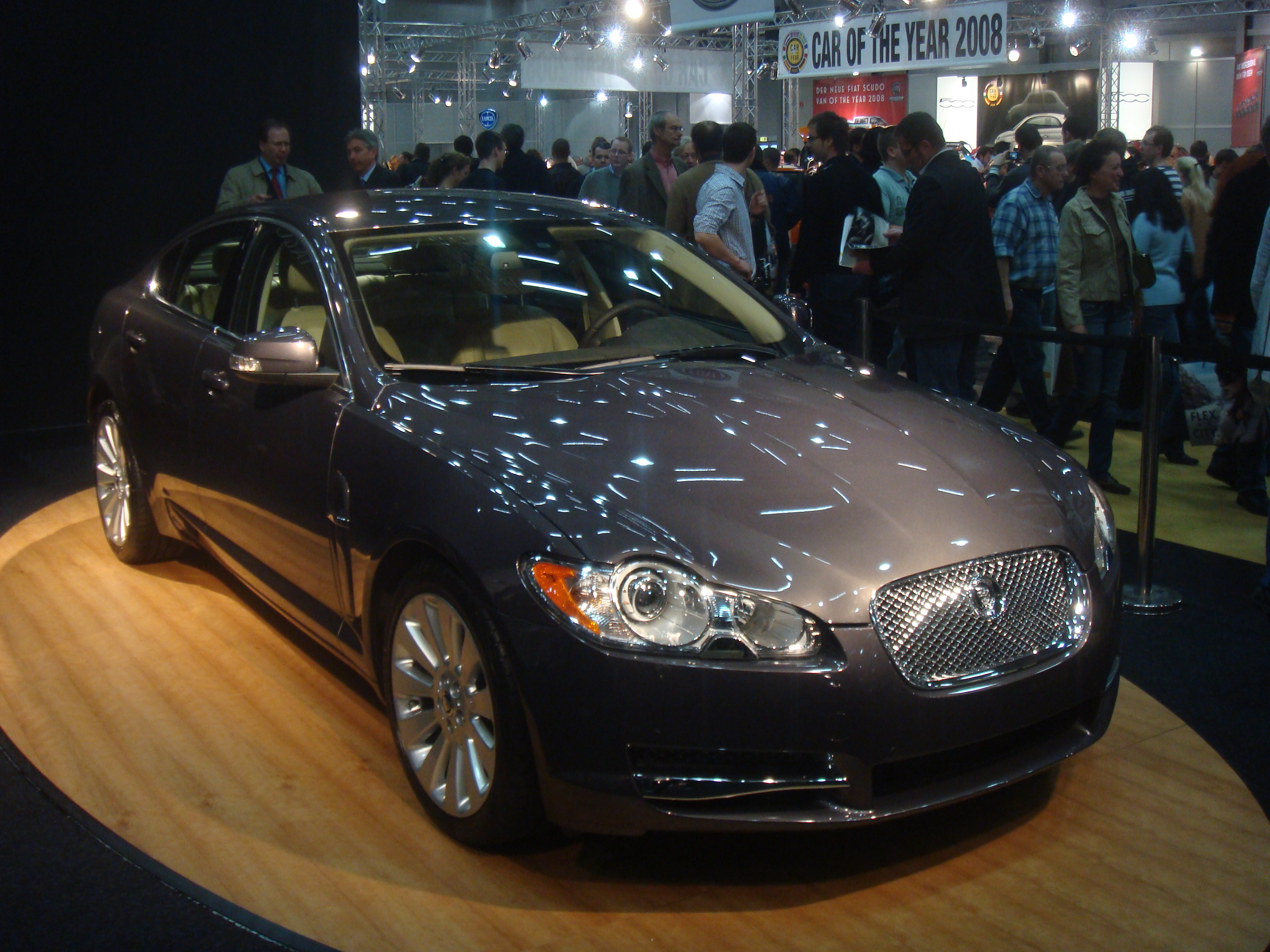
Jaguar XF in Geneva MotorShow in 2012

The automotive industry in the United Kingdom is now best known for premium and sports car marquees including Aston Martin, Bentley, Daimler, Jaguar, Lagonda, Land Rover, Lotus, McLaren, MG, Mini, Morgan and Rolls-Royce. Volume car manufacturers with a major presence in the UK include Ford (only produces engines and gearboxes in Britain having ended passenger car production in 2002 and commercial vehicle production in 2013), Honda, Nissan, Toyota and Vauxhall Motors (owned by Stellantis). Commercial vehicle manufacturers active in the UK include Alexander Dennis, Ford, IBC Vehicles (owned by Stellantis), Leyland Trucks (owned by Paccar) and London Taxis International. Peugeot did produce cars in Britain at the former Rootes Group plant near Coventry until its closure in 2006, having purchased the European operations of American carmaker Chrysler in 1978. MG cars are produced at the Longbridge plant in Birmingham, where its Chinese owners SAIC Motor in 2008, three years after the former MG Rover group went into liquidation; less than half of the original Longbridge site is still in use for production, and the number of people employed there is also much lower than it was under MG Rover.

MG and Rover were once part of the British Motor Corporation (which became British Leyland in the 1960s), as were Jaguar until 1984. British Leyland was nationalised in 1975 and privatized under Rover Group in 1988. Land Rover and Mini remained part of the Rover Group until 2000, when BMW sold the MG and Rover marques to a consortium, retained the rights to build the new Mini, and sold Land Rover to Ford, although Ford has since sold Jaguar and Land Rover to Indian industrial giant Tata. British Leyland also produced cars under marques including Austin, Morris and Triumph, but these were phased out during the 1980s as the Rover brand gradually took over.

Ford began production in Britain at Trafford Park, Manchester, at a factory which opened in 1911, but this plant was eventually closed down as it concentrated production in newer factories at locations including Liverpool, Bridgend, Southampton and its flagship Dagenham plant. Until the late 1960s, Ford's British model range was largely separate to its German-built range, but over the next decade its European range was gradually brought into line and a new Spanish factory was opened in 1976. From the 1970s onwards, German, Spanish and later Belgian produced Ford cars were imported to Britain, although passenger car production of some models continued in Britain until 2002 and commercial vehicle production did not finish until 2013, when the Southampton plant was closed and production switched to Turkey. The Halewood plant near Liverpool has been the site of Jaguar and Land Rover production since 2000.

Vauxhall originally produced cars at a London plant before moving to Luton, while under General Motors. A second factory opened at Ellesmere Port, Cheshire, in 1962. During the 1970s, Vauxhall's model range was brought into line with the model lines of Opel, with the two brands sharing basic designs, although they normally had separate model names until the 1990s. The Opel brand was discontinued in Britain at the end of the 1980s, and the Vauxhall brand largely confined to Britain. Passenger car production at the Luton plant ended in 2004, the site remains active for commercial vehicle production.

Nissan started to produce cars in Britain, in 1986 and as the first Japanese car-marker, opening a new factory on Wearside. Toyota opened a factory near Derby in 1992 and a Welsh plant on Deeside in 1993. Around the same time that Honda began producing cars at its (now defunct) Swindon plant.

In 2008, the UK automotive manufacturing sector had a turnover of £52.5 billion, generated £26.6 billion of exports and produced around 1.45 million passenger vehicles and 203,000 commercial vehicles. In that year around 180,000 people were directly employed in automotive manufacturing in the UK, with a further 640,000 people employed in automotive supply, retail and servicing. The UK is a major centre for engine manufacturing and in 2008 around 3.16 million engines were produced in the country. The UK has a significant presence in auto racing and the UK motorsport industry currently employs around 38,500 people, comprises around 4,500 companies and has an annual turnover of around £6 billion.

The origins of the UK automotive industry date back to the final years of the 19th century. By the 1950s the UK was the second-largest manufacturer of cars in the world (after the United States) and the largest exporter. However, in subsequent decades the industry experienced considerably lower growth than competitor nations such as France, Germany and Japan and by 2008 the UK was the 12th-largest producer of cars measured by volume. Since the late 1980s many British car marques have become owned by foreign companies including BMW, SAIC, TATA and Volkswagen Group. Rights to many currently dormant brands, including Austin, Riley, Rover and Triumph, are also owned by foreign companies.

== North America ==
=== Canada ===
Canada is currently the 11th largest auto producer in the World with 2.1 million annual output, down from 7th place with 3 million peak a few years ago. China, Spain, India, Brazil, Mexico recently surpassed Canadian production for the first time ever. Canada's highest rankings ever was 2nd largest producer in the World between 1918 and 1923 and 3rd after WWII.

The Canadian auto industry traces its roots to the very beginning of the automobile. The first large-scale production of automobiles in Canada took place in Walkerville, near Windsor, Ontario in 1904. In the first year of operations, Gordon McGregor and Wallace Campbell, along with a handful of workmen produced 117 Model "C" Ford vehicles at the Walkerville Wagon Works factory.

Through marques such as Brooks Steam, Redpath, Tudhope, McKay, Galt Gas-Electric, Gray-Dort, Brockville Atlas, C.C.M., and McLaughlin, Canada had many domestic auto brands. In 1918 McLaughlin was bought by an American firm, General Motors, and was re-branded as General Motors of Canada. Driven by the demands of World War I, Canada's automotive industry had grown, by 1923, into the second-largest in the world, although it was still made up of relatively inefficient plants producing many models behind a high tariff wall. High consumer prices and production inefficiencies characterized the Canadian auto industry prior to the signing of the 1965 Automotive Products Trade Agreement with the United States.

The 1964 Automotive Products Trade Agreement or "Auto Pact" represents the single most important factor in making the Canadian automotive industry what it is today. Key features of the Auto Pact were the 1:1 production to sales ratio and Canadian Value Added requirements.

Magna International is Canada's biggest domestic firm in the sector, and is the world's third-largest auto parts firm, producing entire vehicles at its Magna Steyr plant in Austria.

=== Mexico ===
The Mexican automotive industry mostly consists of foreign assembly plants. The earliest ones were established by American companies, then various European and Japanese manufacturers followed. More units of the original Volkswagen Beetle, in production in Puebla from 1955 to 2003, were built in Mexico than anywhere else. Mexican production increased rapidly in the 1990s, because of NAFTA, which led to many American, European, and Japanese manufacturers to move the production of many of their USA-market and Canadian-market models to Mexico, putting Mexico at 6th place in the world in terms of units produced. The only current domestic Mexican automobile manufacturers are VUHL, Zacua and DINA, both of which source their engines from foreign manufacturers.

=== United States ===
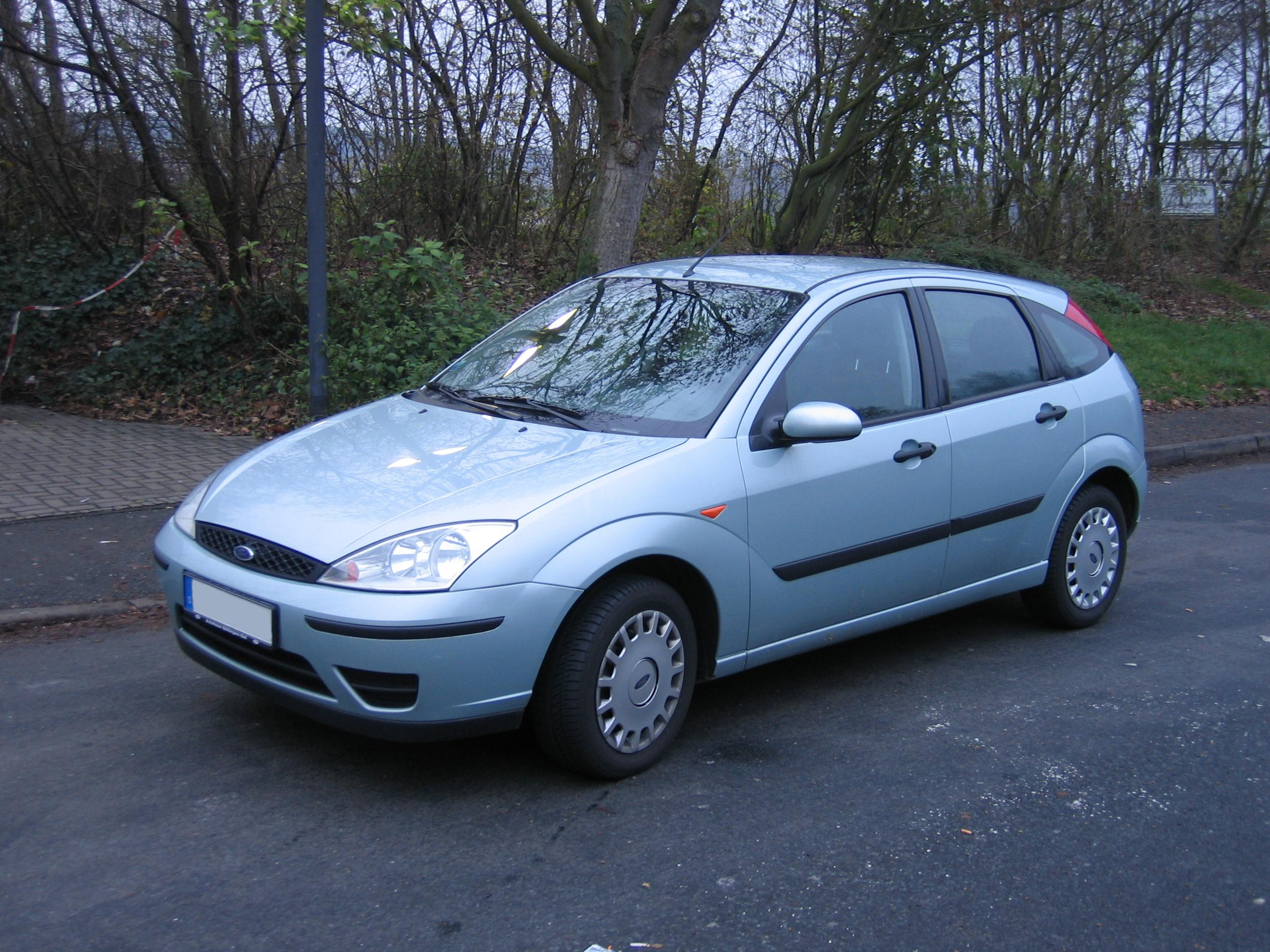
Ford Focus Internation California ZTS

The American automobile industry began in the 1890s and rapidly evolved into the largest automotive producer in the World through the use of mass-production. The industry began with hundreds of manufacturers, but by the end of the 1920s it became dominated by three large companies – General Motors, Ford and Chrysler. After the Great Depression and World War II, these companies continued to prosper and the US produced near 3/4 of all automobiles in the world at 1950. However, after record of production near 15 million in some 1970s years, at the beginning and middle of that decade, a combination of high oil prices, increased competition from foreign auto manufacturers, and increasing government regulation severely affected the companies. In the 1980s–1990s US auto power was overtaken by rapidly growing Japanese auto industry but in the 21st century both of them are balanced and now are the second largest in the World (after China) with annual production of 8–10 million. In the ensuing years, the companies periodically bounced back, but by 2008 the industry was in turmoil. As a result, General Motors and Chrysler filed bankruptcy reorganization and were bailed out with loans and investments from the federal government. Chrysler later merged into Fiat as Fiat Chrysler and is today a part of the multinational Stellantis group. American electric automaker Tesla emerged onto the scene in 2009 and has since grown to be one of the world's most valuable companies, producing around 1/4th of the world's fully-electric passenger cars.

== Oceania ==
=== Australia ===
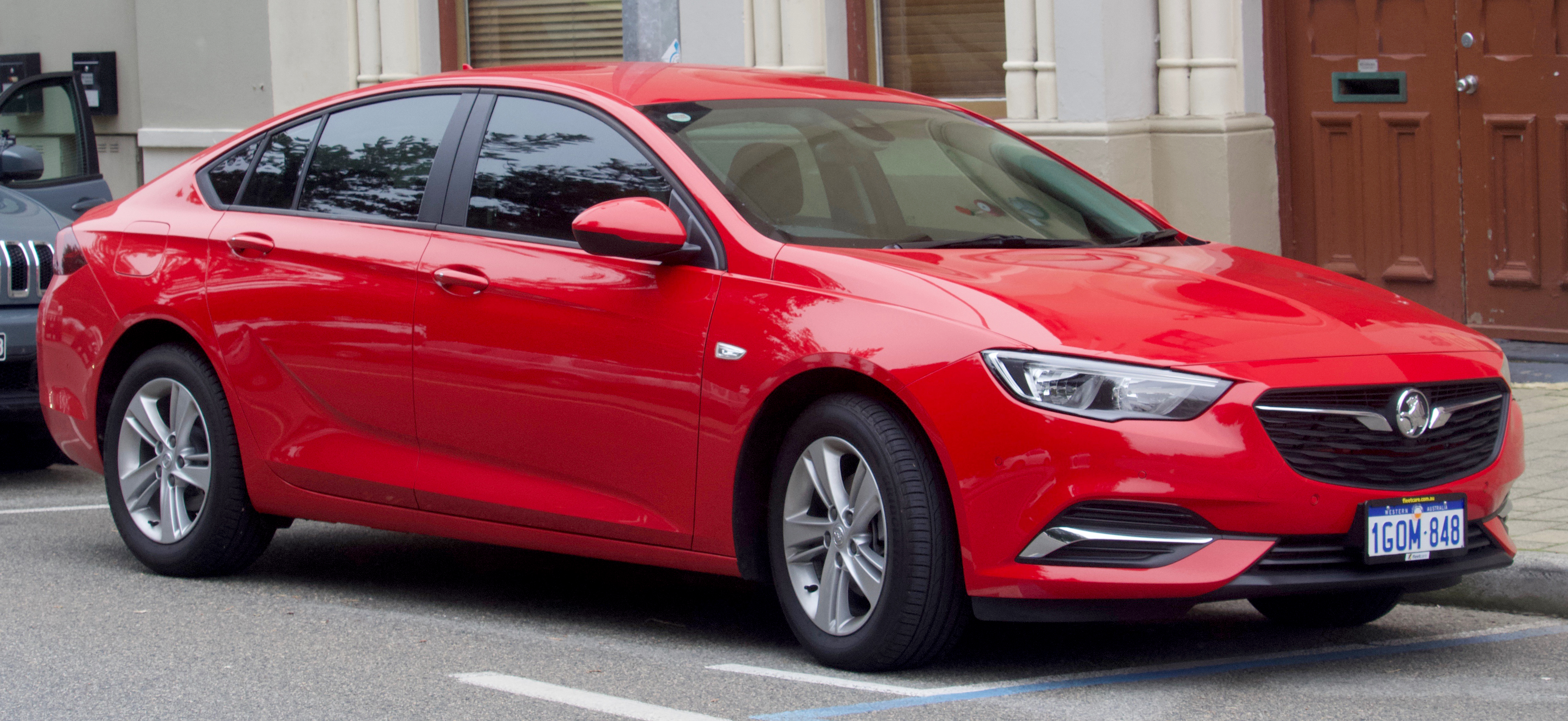
Holden Commodore

Holden (part of General Motors), Ford, Toyota and Mitsubishi all manufactured cars in Australia, but by 2017 had all closed down. Factors causing the closure included non competitive Australian labour and the effect of government tariffs.

Australia first began to produce cars in 1897 with cars made by Tarrant Motor & Engineering Co. The first major Australian car maker was Ford Australia. The first Australian designed mass-produced car was the Holden 48-215, released in 1948. Annual production of vehicles reached a maximum of almost 500,000 in the 1970s (at the time tenth globally), and 400,000 in the 2000s, but by 2012, production declined to approximately 200,000 (30th place), due to competition from Asian automakers and changing consumer preferences.

Some indigenous small scale car manufacture has existed in the past in Australia, including the Bufori Madison.

Mitsubishi closed down in 2008. Ford closed down in 2016, and Holden and Toyota both closed in October 2017. Trucks are still assembled in Australia from imported components.

=== New Zealand ===
New Zealand no longer has a vehicle assembly industry for passenger cars. Changes to protection of the local industry eventually led to the closure of the assembly plants since they could not compete with foreign counterparts. The largest car companies in New Zealand are Toyota New Zealand and Ford New Zealand. Annual output of automotive industry achieved near 100,000 in the 1980s and then decreased due to Asian made imports. Currently, there are a number of small domestic companies producing original kit and replica cars for both the local and international markets. Several of these, while small in size are noted internationally for the quality of their workmanship.

== South America ==
=== Argentina ===
Argentina has a long history of auto manufacturing, almost entirely focused on the manufacture of foreign designed vehicles. They produced 100,000 units (12th in the world) in 1960, 200,000 in 1970, 300,000 in 1980, then decreased to 100,000 in 1990 due to a deep economic crisis. A restoration had occurred by the middle of the 2000s and then significant growth boosted annual production to more than 800,000 units (3rd place in Latin America—after Brazil and Mexico, and 20th in the world).

The Argentine industry is regulated by the Asociación De Fabricantes de Automotores (Adefa), created in 1960, which includes makers of automobiles, light vehicles, trucks and buses. Adefa is part of the Organisation Internationale des Constructeurs d'Automobiles (OICA), based in Paris. Some global companies are present in Argentina such as BYD, Fiat, Volkswagen Group, Ford, Iveco, General Motors, Nissan, Toyota, Scania, Mercedes-Benz, Renault, Honda, PSA Group and also some national companies such as Materfer, TAT S.A., Helvética, Crespi, PurSang, etc. The last have produced replicas of classic cars equipped with modern technology.

=== Brazil ===
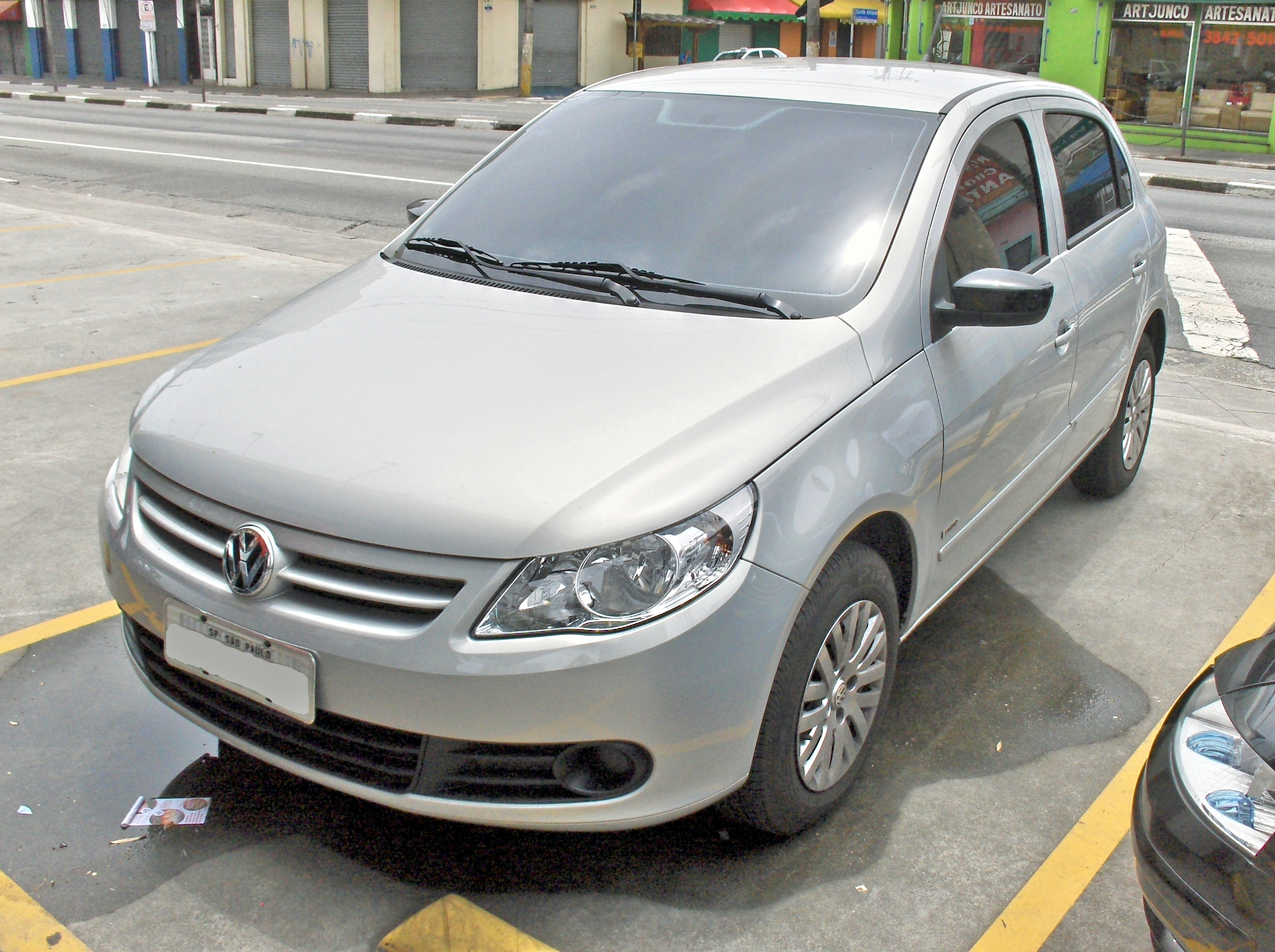
Volkswagen Gol

The Brazilian automotive industry was similar in size to the industries in Mexico and Argentina until 1960. It then had two spikes in growth and became a regional leader and even a world leader. By the end of the 1970s, annual production exceeded one million units, making it the 10th largest automotive manufacturer in the world. After some decreases around 1990, a new period of growth has allowed Brazil to surpass traditional automotive leaders (e.g. Belgium, the United Kingdom, Italy, Canada, Russia, Spain, France) in terms of annual production (nearly 3.5 million vehicles per year, 7th largest in the world).

The Brazilian industry is regulated by the Associação Nacional dos Fabricantes de Veículos Automotores (Anfavea), created in 1956, which includes makers of automobiles, light vehicles, trucks and buses, and agriculture machines with factories in Brazil. Anfavea is part of the Organisation Internationale des Constructeurs d'Automobiles (OICA), based in Paris. Most large global automakers have a presence in Brazil, including BYD, Fiat, Volkswagen Group, Ford, General Motors, Nissan Motors, Toyota, MAN SE, Mitsubishi, Mercedes-Benz, Volvo, DAF, Iveco, Renault, Honda, Hyundai, Audi, BMW, Peugeot, Citroen, Kia, Suzuki, SsangYong, JAC Motors, Chery, etc. Brazil also has a number of emerging national companies such as CAOA Chery, Troller, Marcopolo S.A., Agrale, Randon S.A., Excalibur, TAC, Lobini, etc., some of which have produced replicas of classic cars upgraded with modern technology. In the past there were national brands such as FNM (Fabrica Nacional de Motores), DKW Vemag and Gurgel, Puma Veículos e Motores Ltda.

=== Colombia ===
Automotive manufacturing in Colombia had achieved an output of more than 100,000 vehicles per year in 2005, but their output in the past few years has been reduced by about 30,000 vehicles per year. Surprisingly, it has seen an incremental increase from the year 2008 and onwards, principally attributable to increased export rates to other Latin American countries from one major factory: Sofasa. This factory assembles Renault cars for markets like Mexico, Peru, Bolivia and Ecuador.

=== Ecuador ===
The automotive industry in Ecuador is small, with an annual production 20–40 thousand units. Manufacturers like GM Ómnibus (producing the Chevrolet Aveo or the Chevrolet Sail) or AYMESA (producing the Kia Rio) exist.

=== Uruguay ===
The Uruguayan automotive industry has seen development recently thanks to with Chinese manufacturers involvement, with plants such as Nordex (in Montevideo, producing for Geely), SOCMA (in Barra de Carrasco, producing for Chery; closed in 2015), or Lifan (producing in San José Department; closed in 2021) and Effa Motors. Old models are Grumett and Indio.

=== Venezuela ===
Venezuelan automotive manufacturing has the 36th largest output (by units of vehicles) worldwide and the 4th largest in Latin America (after Brazil, Mexico, and Argentina). In the 1970s and 1980s, vehicle production was between 150 and 200 thousand units per year of mainly US-developed vehicles. Chrysler, Ford, Iveco, General Motors, Mitsubishi Motors/Hyundai Motor, Honda and Toyota have established assembly plants in the country. Because of economic problems in the country, since 2012 the automotive industry has collapsed. Currently most companies have downsized or have paralyzed operations due to the difficulty in obtaining foreign currency to import necessary auto parts. Venezuela had Venirauto. This was founded by the government on November 3, 2006 in Maracay. It is related to Iran Khodro and SAIPA from Iran partnership. The production of automobiles started in 2007 but ended not much longer since the production was very limited.

In actuality most of the few new cars in Venezuela are imported by the former manufacturers, dealers or third party sellers since very few people can afford cars paid in cash in US currency since there's no credit since at least 2013.
