= Vasadze =

Vasadze may refer to:

- Mamuka Vasadze, former acting Chief Prosecutor of Georgia (2018)
- Tariel Vasadze (born 1947), Ukrainian businessman
- 29122 Vasadze, a main-belt asteroid

== See also ==
- Vashadze, a Georgian surname
