= ZAZ =

Ukrainian car manufacturer

Zaporizhzhia Automobile Building Plant

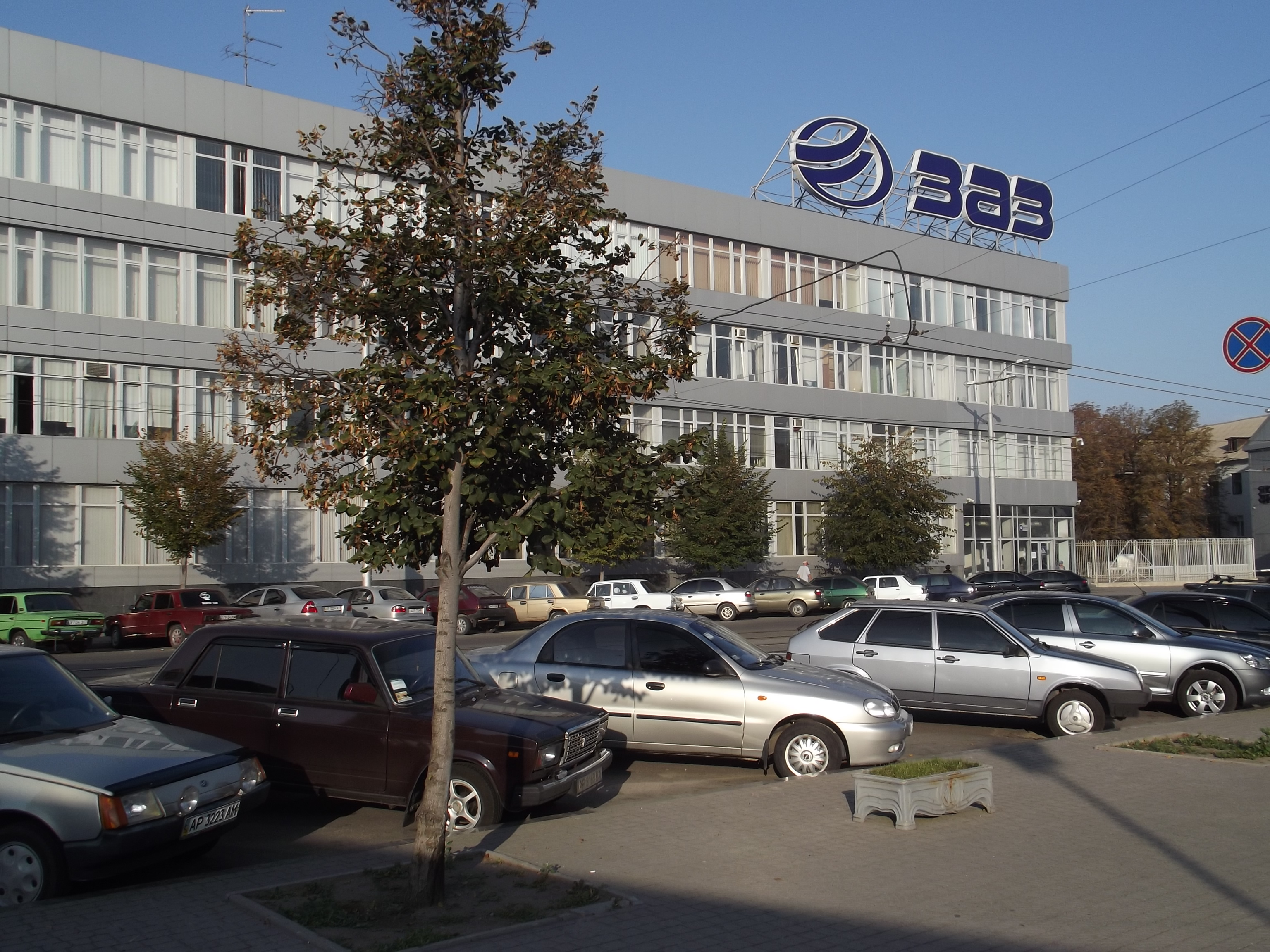
- ZAZ factory in Zaporizhzhia
- Type: Subsidiary
- Industry: Automotive
- Founded: 1923; 103 years ago
- Founder: Abraham J. Koop
- Headquarters: Zaporizhzhia, Ukraine
- Area served: International
- Products: Cars, vans, buses
- Revenue: ▲ ₴12.95 billion
- Net income: ▲ ₴564 million
- Parent: UkrAVTO
- Website: avtozaz.com

ZAZ or Zaporizhzhia Automobile Building Plant (Ukrainian: ЗАЗ, Запорізький автомобілебудівний завод, romanized: Zaporiz'kyi avtomobilebudivnyi zavod or Запорізький автозавод, Zaporiz'kyi avtozavod) is Ukraine's main automobile manufacturer based in the south-eastern city of Zaporizhzhia. ZAZ manufactures cars, buses and trucks. ZAZ is also often known by the public as its former parent company, AvtoZAZ.

== History ==
The date of the plant's foundation is considered to be 1863. In 1908, the company was founded, which later became the Melitopol Motor Plant (MeMZ). In 1923, the former Abram Koop plant was renamed "Communar". In 1960, the Melitopol Motor Plant began supplying its engines to the Zaporizhzhia Automobile Plant. Since 1975, MeMZ has been a part of the production association "AvtoZAZ". Today, it is one of the structural elements of PJSC "ZAZ". In 1961, the plant was renamed to "Zaporizhzhia Automobile Plant". The plant was engaged in the production of a single car, ZAZ-965, which went down in history as a "humpbacked Zaporozhets".

On April 15, 1998, JV "AvtoZAZ-DEU" (CJSC "ZAZ", from January 2003) was established, as a closed joint-stock company on the production base of JSC "Avtozaz". The authorized capital was formed at the expense of the founders' contributions: from OJSC Avtozaz - property in the amount equivalent to $150; from Daewoo Motors - $150 million. In addition to the main enterprise in Zaporizhzhia, the joint venture included the Melitopol Motor Plant (Fracturing Plant AvtoZAZ-Motor), the Black Sea Plant of Automobile Units (Fracturing Plant ChZAA), and the Pologi Plant Iskra (Fracturing Plant Iskra) as self-supporting enterprises.

Following the bankruptcy of Daewoo Motors in 2001, UKRAVTO Group bought AvtoZAZ in 2002. All production facilities of AvtoZAZ (primarily MeMZ and the Black Sea Motor Plant) were transformed into ZAZ. Furthermore, the company adopted a new logo. In 2003, the Swiss company Hirsch & CIE bought Daewoo's stake (50%) in the joint venture.

PJSC "ZAZ" is currently Ukraine's only company with a full passenger car production cycle, which includes stamping, welding, painting, body equipment, and assembly. The plant has created and continually improved with modern, high-tech production, meeting the requirements of international standard ISO 9001, version 2000.

The first three symbols of the VIN code of Zaporizhzhia-made cars are Y6D.

=== From A. J. Koop to Kommunar ===
The company that became ZAZ developed out of four businesses founded by German entrepreneur Abram J. Koop to manufacture agricultural machinery. In 1863, local Mennonite industrialist Abram J. Koop built a factory for the production of iron parts for windmills, reapers, threshers, and plows. Later, it was nationalized and restarted as the state-operated Kommunar factory, which continued to produce twenty-four types of machines.. Its first combine harvesters appeared in 1929, with 129,724 being built by 1952 (excluding the war years). In 1930, Kommunar began producing the first Soviet harvester, Kommunar, based on the American Holt Caterpillar horse-drawn harvester. The production of the harvester allowed the Soviet Union to cease importing harvesters from abroad.

=== From harvesters to cars ===
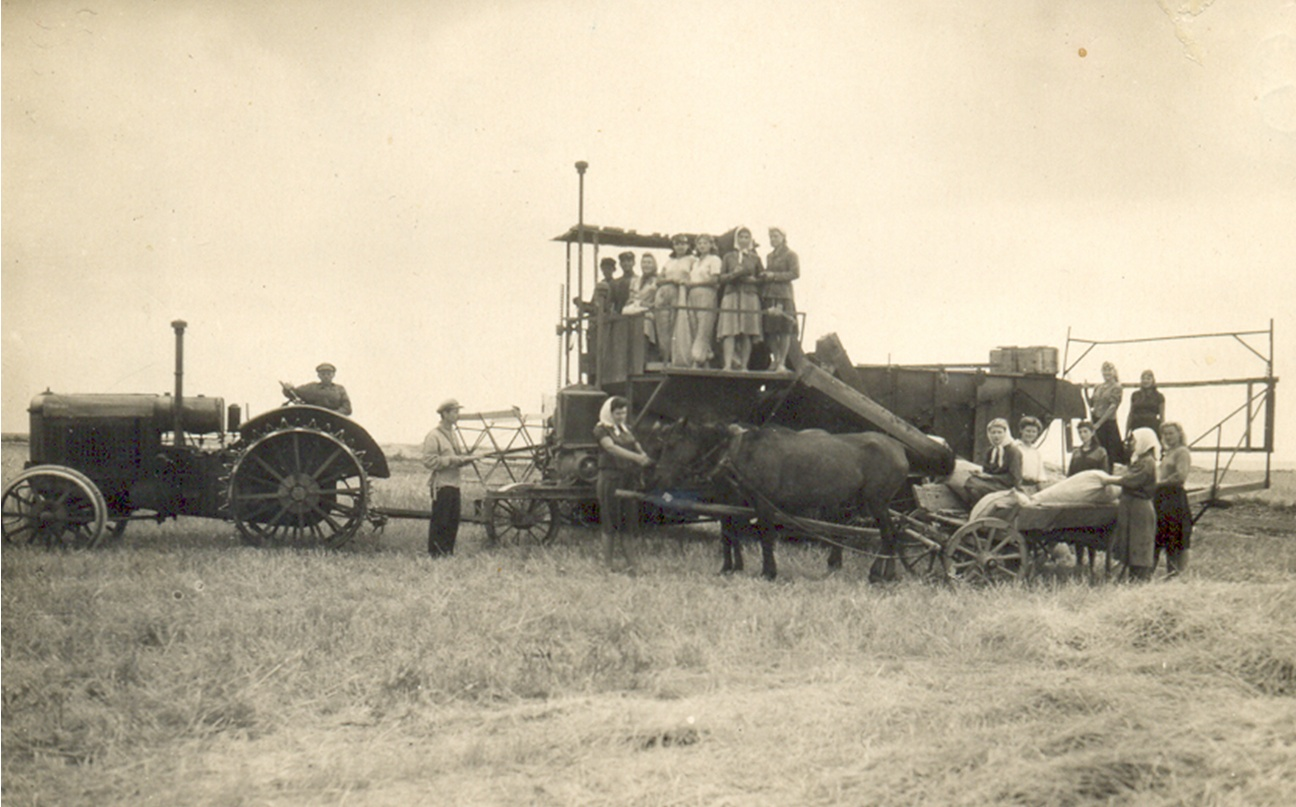
Kommunar harvester

In 1956, the company, then known as MZMA, launched mass production of the Moskvitch 402, one of the Soviet Union's most publicly accessible cars. Following the growing trend of small cars (then accounting for between 25% and 40% of all European car sales), the minister in charge of Minavtroprom (the Soviet automotive ministry) selected the new Fiat 600 as the model to follow. The first prototype, the MZMA 444, appeared in October 1957. It was powered by a flat twin-cylinder MD-65 engine, provided by the Irbit Motorcycle Plant, which was "totally unsuited", as it produced only 17.5 hp (13.0 kW; 17.7 PS) and lasted only 30,000 km (19,000 mi) between major overhauls. As a result, a search for another engine began, and the success of the VW Type 1's boxer led to a preference for an air-cooled engine, which NAMI (the National Automobile Institute) had on the drawing board. Minavtroprom, however, preferred a 23 hp (17 kW; 23 PS) 746 cc (45.5 cu in) V4 engine, the NAMI-G, which had the additional advantage of being developed for the LuAZ-967.

On 28 November 1958, the new car was approved for production, with the company's name changed to ZAZ (Zaporizhzhia Automobile Building Plant) reflecting its new profile. The Zaporizhzhia factory was supplemented with the Mikoyan Diesel-Building Factory in Melitopol, which was part of the Soyuzdiesel combinat.

On 12 June 1959, the prototype of the first car, dubbed the ZAZ-965 Zaporozhets, was delivered. It was approved on 25 July 1960 and entered production on 25 October 1960.

Following the success of the ZAZ-965, plant manager Yuri Sorochkin planned a forward control microbus on the ZAZ-965's platform (akin to the VW Type 2 being built on a modified Type 1 pan), with a 350 kg (770 lb) payload, as the ZAZ 970. Sorochkin hoped to capture the market for compact utility vehicles, which were in perennially short supply in the Soviet Union. The project was prototyped by a team under an individual by the name of Yuri Danilov, which pioneered use of 0.7 mm (0.028 in)-thick steel in the Soviet Union. The steel was provided by Zaporizkyi Metallurgical Plant. The engine and transmission were straight out of a ZAZ-965, which caused liftover problems, because the V4 was mounted under the rear floor. Three prototypes were built in 1962: a van with 350 kg (770 lb) payload and 2.5 m^{3} (88 ft^{3}) volume, a pickup with a 400 kg (880 lb) payload, and a microbus able to seat six or seven plus a 175 kg (386 lb); even four-wheel drive models (971, 971B, and 971V) were planned. None was built.

In 1975, the factory was consolidated in the AvtoZAZ holding, which was transformed into joint-stock company in 1990s. In 1986, ZAZ, together with Comau, installed a new production complex. The Illichivsk factory of automobile parts (IZAA) in one of the biggest freight sea ports on Black Sea in Illichivsk became part of the AutoZAZ holding.

In November 1987, the plant began producing a new front wheel drive car ZAZ-1102 Tavria. In 1989, it became known that new models were being developed based on the "Tavria" - a five-door ZAZ-1105 and a "Kombi" model with "station wagon" body. In October 1989, the plant produced its three millionth car. All these cars were powered by a water cooled, front mounted MeMZ engine and fall into micro-class.

=== In Ukraine ===
On 1 June 1994, the factory ceased production of its ZAZ-968M model.

When AvtoZAZ-Daewoo joint venture with Daewoo Motors was formed in 1998, ZAZ was assigned to the new company as a 50% share on behalf of AvtoZAZ. Daewoo Motors made large investments and established the production of its own models, while keeping and modernizing the native ZAZ brand. CKD kits of Daewoo Lanos, Daewoo Nubira and Daewoo Leganza started assembling the same year in Chornomorsk; at the same time, CKD assembly of a number of older VAZ models started.

Following the bankruptcy of Daewoo Motors in 2001, UkrAVTO corporation bought out AvtoZAZ holding in 2002. All of the AvtoZAZ manufacturing facilities (most notably, MeMZ and Illichivsk assembling plant) were reincorporated into ZAZ. The company even adopted a new logo. The Daewoo part in the joint venture was bought out by Swiss venture Hirsch & CIE in 2003.

End of 2004 saw the beginning of full-scale production of completely domestic ZAZ Lanos (T150), now that CKD kits of Lanos were no longer supplied. In 2006, ZAZ reached an agreement with the Chinese manufacturer Chery Automobile to assemble passenger cars from kits and from 2011 started full-scale production of the Chery A13 under its own badge as ZAZ Forza. The same year production of the Chevrolet Aveo (T250) was moved from the FSO car factory to ZAZ.

By Decree of the President of Ukraine, CJSC "ZAZ" employees were rewarded with State awards of Ukraine in 2009.

In the first half of 2012, ZAZ manufactured 20,060 vehicles, a 30% decline from the same period in 2011. In 2012, Zaporizhzhia Automobile Building Plant started serial full-scale production of new car model, the ZAZ Vida.

=== The era of "Zaporozhets" ===
The history of passenger car production in Zaporizhzhia, which is identified with the history of the Ukrainian automobile industry in general, dates back to 1960, when the first Ukrainian microcar - ZAZ-965 "Zaporozhets" came off the assembly line of the Kommunar plant (currently PJSC ZAZ).

Production of serial machines began on 1 October 1960, and by the end of the year was released about one and a half thousand "Zaporozhtsiv". ZAZ-965 "Zaporozhets" quickly became popular. It cost relatively little and was economical. Operating fuel consumption was 7.3 liters per 100 km against 10 liters in "Moskvich-402" or "Moskvich-407". The full-fledged 4-seater was compact and maneuverable: its length was 3.33 m, and the radius of rotation behind the track of the outer wheel - 5 m. Independent suspension of all wheels, smooth, without a tunnel for the "cardan", bottom, 20-centimeter ground clearance the rear axle provided good passability. There were, of course, shortcomings. For example, the noise, which often annoyed the rear passengers. The doors opened in the old-fashioned way, against the move, and could, if accidentally opened on the move, become a sail that could easily take the car off the road. Unsuccessful, from the point of view of fire safety, was the location of the gas tank in front of the body.

Many motorists were not satisfied with the insufficient engine power, and therefore - the weak dynamics of the "Zaporozhets". Therefore, in October 1962 the production of the modernized ZAZ-965A began. Engine displacement increased from 746 to 887 cm^{3}, respectively, power increased from 22 to 27 hp. The maximum speed has also increased - from 80 to 90 km / h. This machine was produced until 1969. When the 130th anniversary of the plant was celebrated in September 1993, the festive motorcade was opened by one of the first "Zaporozhians", decorated with a banner with the number 332 106. This is the number of cars produced during the years of production - from 1960 to 1969. In 1961, ZAZ designers began to develop the ZAZ-966 car with a new body. However, its production was delayed due to the allied leadership, perhaps for economic reasons - to put on the assembly line a new model just a year after the release of the previous one was considered inappropriate. Therefore, ZAZ-966 was released only six years later. Its engine was also located at the rear. Initially, it was a 30-horsepower MeMZ-966A, which was installed on the latest modifications of the "humpback" predecessor. Then came the 40-horsepower MeMZ-966V, which allowed the car to accelerate to 120 km / h on a straight road. However, in practice, not everyone could develop such a speed, and fines for speeding "Zaporozhets" were so rare that in itself such an event was regarded as a topic worthy of a joke.

Since 1969, on the basis of the model ZAZ-966 began to produce ZAZ-968 with a new engine and some minor changes. Since 1975 in the same body - ZAZ-968A. It featured a new brake system, improved front seats and an ignition lock with anti-theft device. Before the ZAZ-968A in 1972 there was a slightly modernized model ZAZ-968 - it did not have a decorative panel on the front of the body, there was a new unit. A more serious reworking awaited the model in 1979–1980.

ZAZ-968M became not only the last domestic car with a rear engine, but also the most durable, because it was produced until 1994. But he received a new line of engines: more powerful MeMZ-968 GE (45 hp) and MeMZ-968 BE (50 hp).

In total (from 1960 to 1994) 3,422,444 Zaporozhets cars in Zaporizhzhia and air-cooled engines in Melitopol were manufactured.

=== The era of Tavria ===
The development of the ZAZ-1102 "Tavria" spanned multiple decades and included several conceptual prototypes prior to its production launch in 1988. Early prototypes were developed by design teams at the ZAZ plant in Zaporizhzhia (then Kommunar), some of which remained conceptual, while others progressed to testing phases.

The first known front-wheel drive concept bearing the "Tavria" name was produced in 1970 under the direction of chief designer Steshenko. Testing of this model identified significant design shortcomings that prevented further development. In 1973, two new experimental variants—a three-door hatchback and a four-door sedan—were produced, though neither reached mass production. Subsequent iterations included a 1974 front-wheel-drive prototype with a sedan body and a 1976 all-wheel-drive version, which adopted more modern styling features for the period.

Following continued refinement, the final version of the ZAZ-1102 "Tavria" entered serial production in 1988. In 1991, the model received a minor facelift that modified the front fenders and some interior elements. To reduce production costs, manufacturers attempted to replace imported Czech lighting components with domestic alternatives. Economic difficulties in the mid-1990s—marked by declining consumer purchasing power and production quality challenges—impacted the Tavria's viability. In 1995, ZAZ introduced a derivative model, the five-door station wagon ZAZ-1105 "Dana", which remained in production until 1997. Technical updates during the 1990s included a revised electric fan circuit and modifications to the half-shaft design beginning in 1994. However, increased use of domestic Ukrainian components after 1992 reportedly led to a decline in overall build quality. In 1998, following the establishment of the AvtoZAZ-Daewoo joint venture, the Tavria underwent structural updates and received imported components from Korea. During this transitional phase, production continued with interim versions whose specifications may have differed from official documentation. The ZAZ-1103 "Slavuta", a five-door liftback based on the Tavria platform, was introduced in late 1995 and entered full production in 1999.

=== "AvtoZAZ-Daewoo" ===
In 1998, a Ukrainian-Korean joint venture with foreign investment from Daewoo was registered in the form of the closed joint-stock company AvtoZAZ-Daewoo. Production of a qualitatively new ZAZ-110206 "Tavria-Nova" car has been introduced. Production preparation works have been completed and large-scale assembly of European-level cars Daewoo Lanos, Daewoo Nubira, Daewoo Leganza has been started at the Black Sea Automobile Assembly Plant.

Thanks to the financial support of Daewoo, new technologies, new quality control systems, engineering developments, in addition to monetary investment, as well as the continued cooperation of the state government, a new era began for Zaporizhzhya plant. In 1999, UkrAvto Corporation was delegated the functions of managing the state-owned stake in the plant. In 2002, UkrAvto Corporation became the owner of the state block of shares of Zaporizhzhya Automobile Plant (more than 82% of shares of OJSC AvtoZAZ, which in turn owns 50% of shares of CJSC ZAZ) and received the right to manage the enterprise and, in particular, its production programs. In January 2003, the company was renamed the Zaporizhzhia Automobile Plant.

During 1998–2003, the company underwent profound structural changes according to new, world standards. organized quality control of products that meet international standards; production of Daewoo cars began at the car assembly plant in the Black Sea; after modernization at the main plant in Zaporozhye, the production of a qualitatively new Tavria was resumed; administrative and personnel policy changed. This period was also marked by significant changes in the strategy opened up new prospects and opportunities for cooperation with the greats of the global automotive business - DaimlerChrysler, General Motors, Opel, Renault and others, which allowed to implement investment projects to organize full-scale production of leading global brands.

=== PJSC "ZAZ" ===
In 2003, the plant changed its form of ownership and became a Closed Joint-Stock Company with Foreign Investment "Zaporizhzhya Automobile Plant".

Also in 2003, a general distribution agreement was concluded between UkrAvto Corporation (represented by one of its divisions - UkrAvtoZAZ-Service), Zaporizhzhia Automobile Plant and the German company Adam Opel GmbH (European representative office of GMC). Opel acted as a production partner of ZAZ and UkrAvto, providing investments for the development of large- and small-scale production of cars of its model range.

In the same year, the Swiss financial and investment company Hirsch & Cie acquired a 50% stake in ZAZ owned by Daewoo Motors.

In 2004, serial production of the Opel Astra Classic began.

In 2005, full-scale production of the Daewoo Lanos began at the Zaporizhzhia Automobile Plant.

UkrAvto Corporation became the main shareholder of the flagship of the Polish automotive industry - the FSO plant. The Chevrolet Lanos car, manufactured by the Zaporizhzhia Automobile Plant, was exported to Russia.

In 2005, ZAZ designers developed the ZAZ Lanos Pick-up.

In 2005, the plant produced 148,163 cars, in 2006 - 193,113.

In 2006, the production of I-VAN buses was started on the basis of the platform of the well-known Indian company TATA.

In 2010, the production of ZAZ A10 buses with a load-bearing body and units of leading European companies began.

10 September 2010 - ZAZ Lanos Electro van and ZAZ-A10C31 and ZAZ-A10L50 buses were presented at the 2010 Auto Show in Kyiv.

In 2011, production of a new model - ZAZ Forza - began.

In 2011, PJSC "ZAZ" produced 60,862 cars, which is 33.9% more than in 2010 (45,465), with more than 50% of the cars produced for export.

=== Decline ===
On 27 December 2016 ZAZ joint stock company officially changed its name to Promautoinvest. By 2017, as a result of economic crisis and rising popularity of imported used cars, the factory's annual production had declned to only 825 cars. As a result, the enterprise stopped the production of its trademark Lanos model and took a decision to concentrate on production of commercial vehicles. Eventually, ZAZ transitioned from producing own models to assembly of ZAZ Forza, a licensed adaptation of Chery. At the same time, the enterprise produced up to 50% of car parts for some of the models produced. As of 2021, the plant also assembled Lada and Kia vehicles.

== Reputation ==
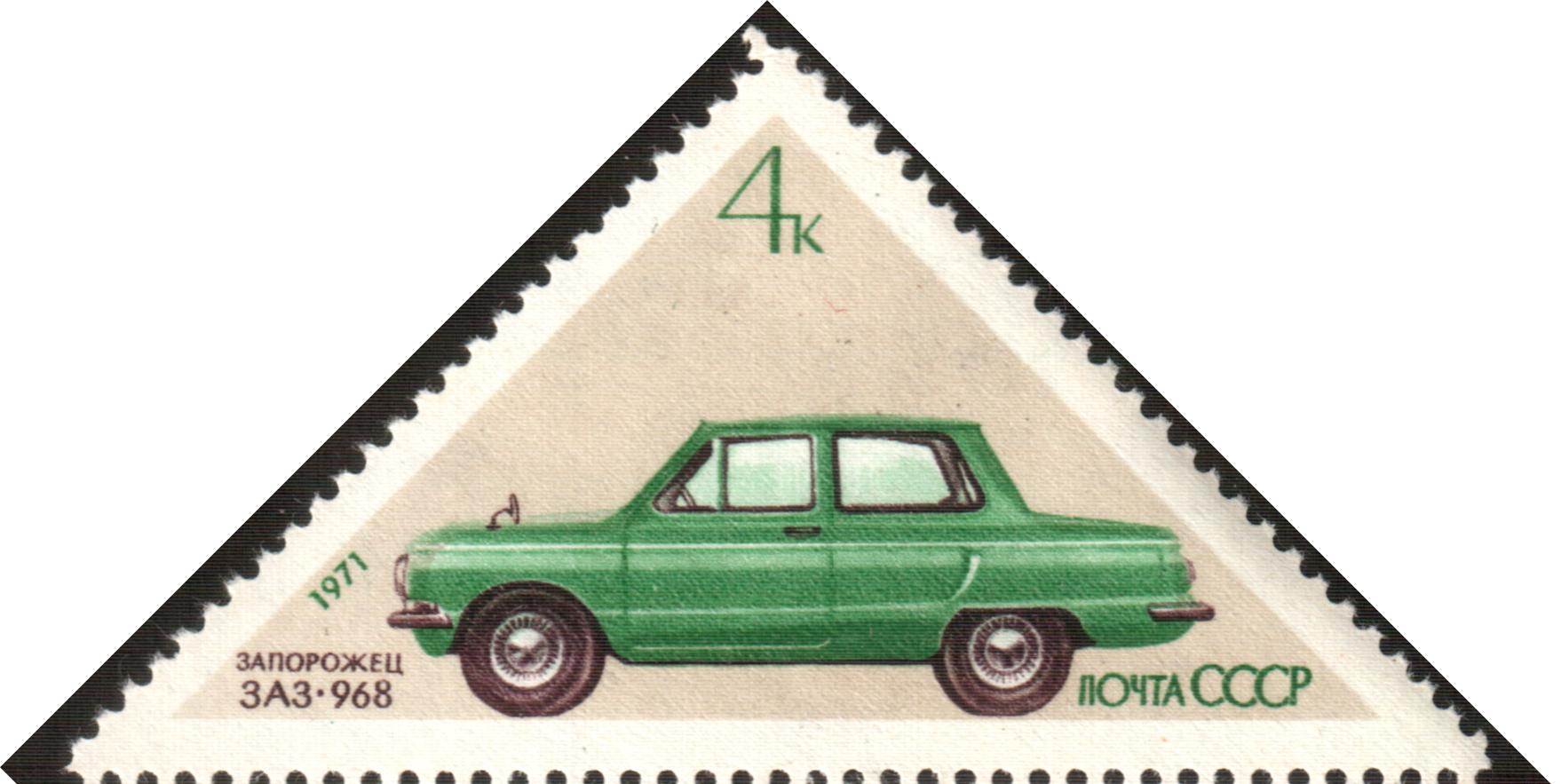
USSR 1971 stamp

ZAZ's products were never held in high esteem by Soviet citizens. In fact, ZAZ's original mission was to create a "people's car", almost like Volkswagen's initial mission. In May 2009, ZAZ won the international tender for the production of vehicles for veterans and disabled people of Azerbaijan.

== Models ==
=== Cars ===
- Zaporozhets
  - ZAZ-965 (1960–1962)
    - ZAZ-965P
  - ZAZ-965A (1962–1969)
    - ZAZ-965AE "Jalta"
  - ZAZ-966 (1967–1971)
  - ZAZ-968 (1972–1978)
  - ZAZ-968A (1974–1980)
  - ZAZ-968M (1980–1994)
    - ZAZ-968MP
- Tavria
  - ZAZ-1102 (1989–1997)
    - ZAZ-1105
  - ZAZ-1102 "Nova" (1998–2007)
    - ZAZ-11055
  - ZAZ-1103 (1998–2011)

=== Buses ===
- Minibuses
  - ZAZ A07 I-VAN (2005–2020)
  - ZAZ A08 (2020–present)
- Midibuses
  - ZAZ A07A1 I-VAN (2006-2021)
  - ZAZ A10 (2008–present)
    - ZAZ A10C
    - ZAZ A10L
- Coaches
  - ZAZ A09 (2024–present)

=== Concepts and prototypes ===
- ZAZ-970 (1961)
- ZAZ-971 (1962)
- ZAZ-967 (1965)
- ZAZ-969 (1966)
- ZAZ-1902 (1977)
- ZAZ-2301 (1995)
- ZAZ C701 (2019)

=== Complete knock down assembly ===
Rebadged production performed at the Zaporizhzhia Automobile Building Plant (ZAZ):

- Daewoo Lanos T100 as ZAZ L1300 (2000–2001)
- Daewoo Lanos T100 as ZAZ Sens (2002–2007)
- Daewoo Lanos T100 as ZAZ Lanos (2005–2007)
- Daewoo Lanos T150 as ZAZ Sens (2007–2017)
- Daewoo Lanos T150 as ZAZ Lanos (2007–2017)
- Chery A13 as ZAZ Forza (2010–2014)
- Chevrolet Aveo as ZAZ Vida (2012–2014)

Performed at the Illichivsk Automobile Parts Plant (IZAA):

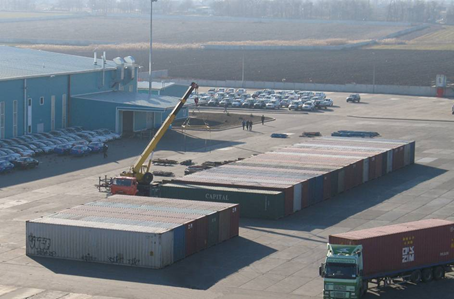
Aerial view on IZAA

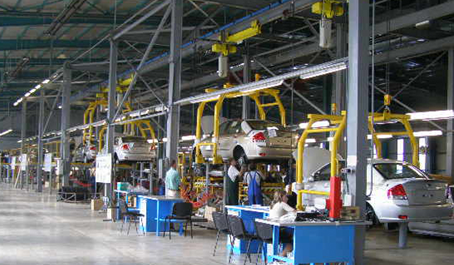
Kia Cerato assembly at IZAA

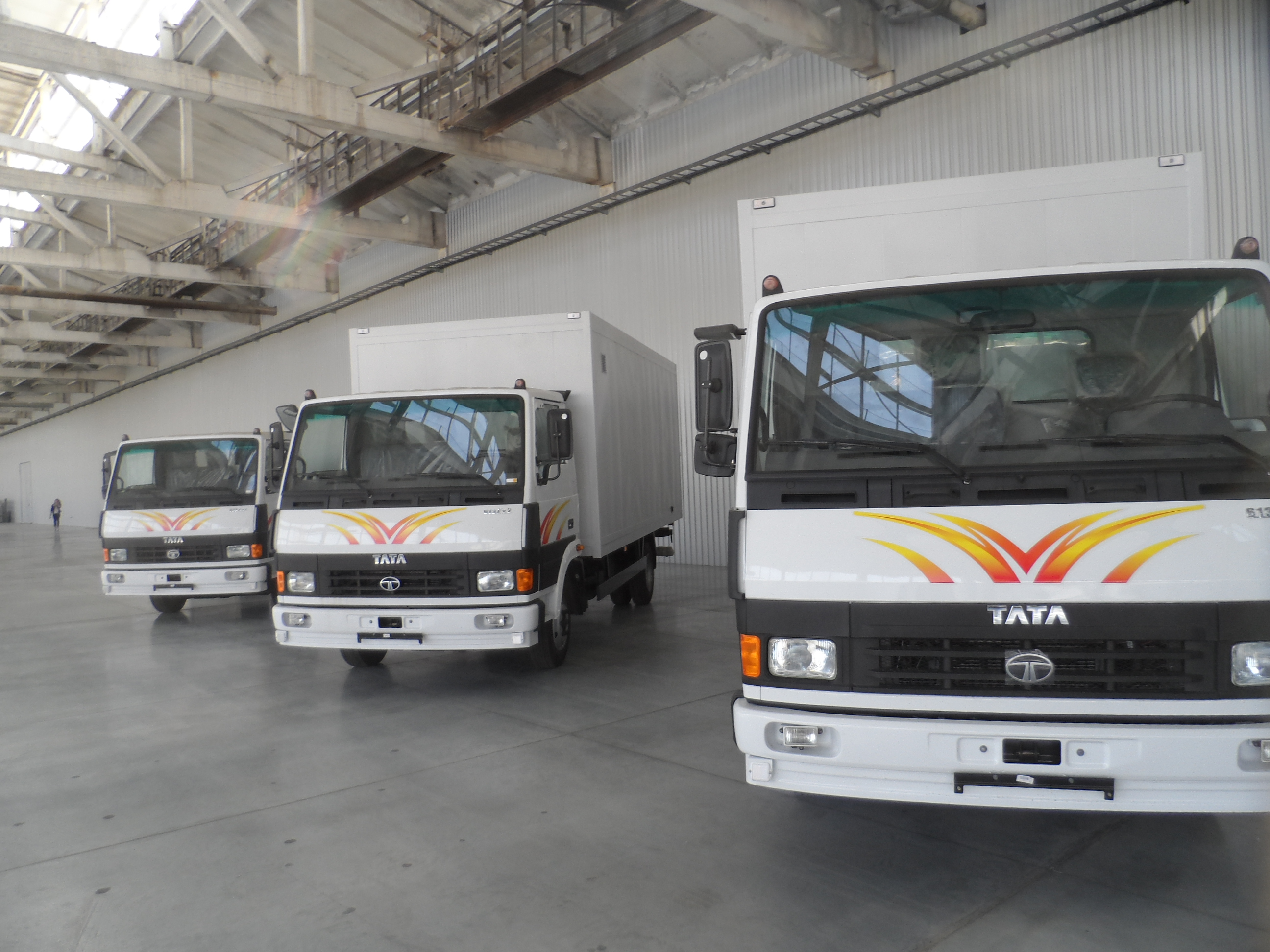
TATA LPT-613 truck assembled at Melitopol Motor Plant

- Daewoo Lanos (1998–2005) (model T100)
- Daewoo Nubira (1998–2001)
- Daewoo Leganza (1998–2001)
- Daewoo Sens (2002–2005)
- Chevrolet Lacetti (2003–2013) (model J200)
- Chevrolet Aveo (2004–2011) (model T200)
- Chevrolet Captiva (2005–2011)
- Chevrolet Epica (2005–2011)
- Chevrolet Evanda (2005–2006)
- Daewoo Tacuma (2005–2006)
- Chery Elara (2006–2010)
- Chevrolet Aveo (2006–2011) (model T250)
- Chery Tiggo (2007–2014)
- Chrysler 300C (2009–2010)
- Kia Cerato (2009—unknown)
- Kia Magentis (2009–unknown)
- Kia Mohave (2009–unknown)
- Kia Picanto (2009–unknown)
- Kia Rio (2009–unknown)
- Kia Sorento (2009–unknown)

Performed at the Zaporizhzhia Automobile Building Plant (ZAZ):

- Mercedes-Benz E-Class (2002–2006)
- Mercedes-Benz M-Class (2002–2006)
- Dacia Solenza (2003)
- Opel Astra (2003–2008)
- Opel Vectra (2003–2008)
- Opel Corsa (2003–2008)
- Opel Combo (2003–2008)
- Chery Amulet (2005-2008)
- Lada Samara 21093 (2005–2011)
- Lada Samara 21099 (2005–2011)
- Kia Cee'd (2009–2010)
- Kia Sportage (2009–2010)
- Renault Arkana (2020–2022)
- Lada Granta (2021–2022)
- Lada Largus (2021–2022)
- Lada Niva Legend (2021–2022)
- Lada Niva Travel (2021–2022)
- Lada Vesta (2021–2022)
- Lada Xray (2021–2022)

Current production performed at the Melitopol Motor Plant (MeMZ):

- Tata LPT 613 (2014–present)

== Production capacity ==
- 1998 — 24,000
- 1999 — 6,000▼
- 2000 — 11,700▲
- 2001 — 14,800▲
- 2002 — 23,800▲
- 2003 — 69,600▲
- 2004 — 126,000▲
- 2005 — 148,163▲
- 2006 — 193,113▲
- 2007 — 282,300▲
- 2008 — 257,600▼
- 2009 — 46,180▼
- 2010 — 45,465▼
- 2011 — 60,862▲
- 2012 — 42,700▼
- 2013 — 50,400▲
- 2014 — 13,100▼
- 2015 — 3,937▼
- 2016 — 526▼
- 2017 — 1,674▲
- 2018 — 131▼
- 2019 ---
- 2020 --- 885▲

== Assembly in other countries ==
- Poland (DAMIS Motor Poland) - ZAZ-1102 Tavria
- Syria - ZAZ-1103 Slavuta
- Egypt (General Motors Egypt) - Chevrolet Lanos
- Kazakhstan (AgromashHolding) - ZAZ Chance
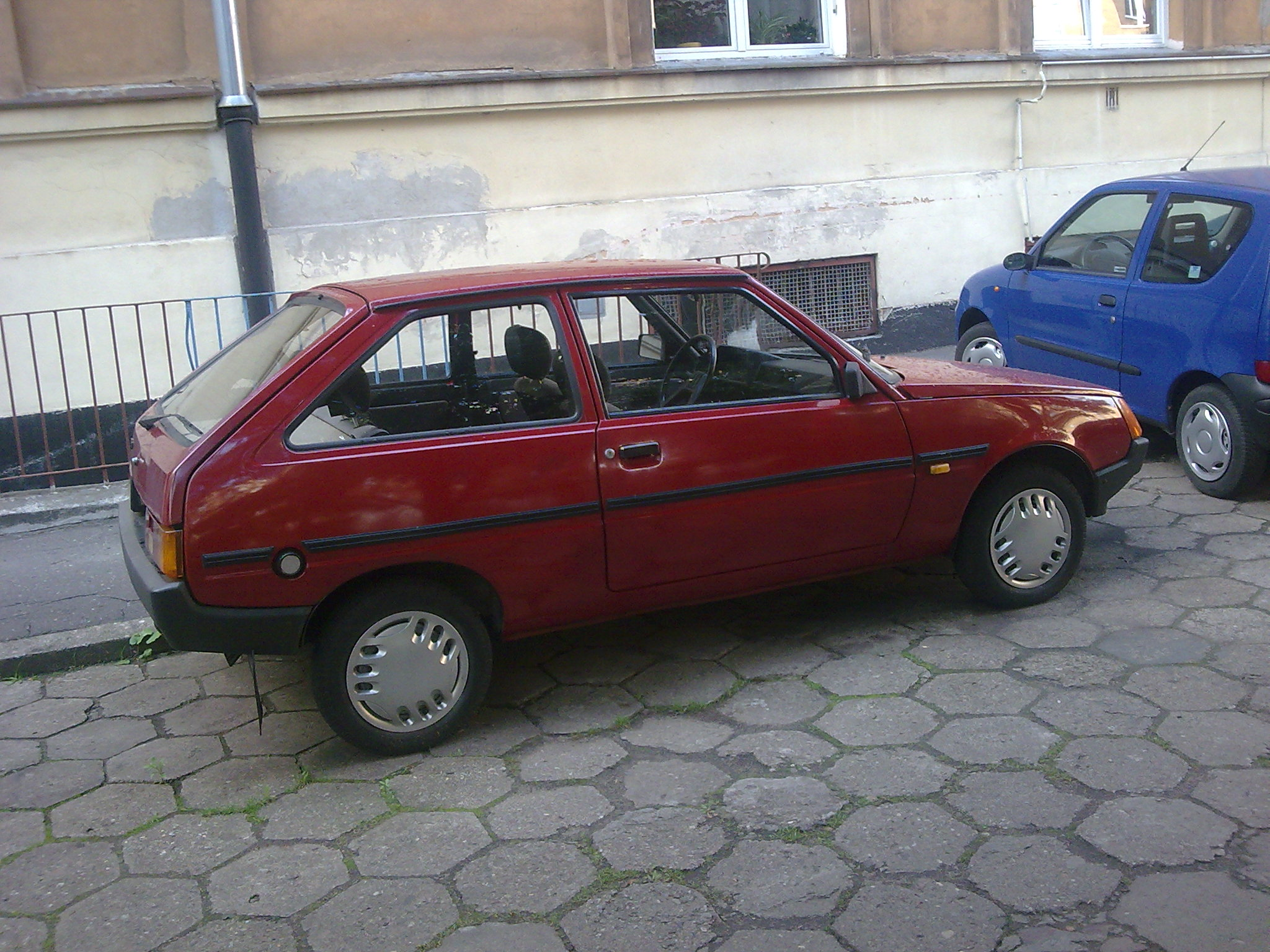
ZAZ Tavria in Poland

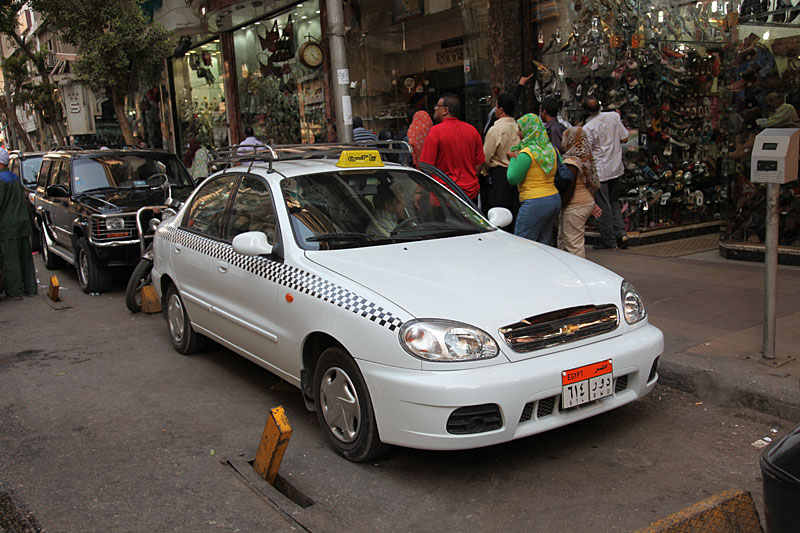
Chevrolet Lanos is assembled in Egypt using parts from ZAZ

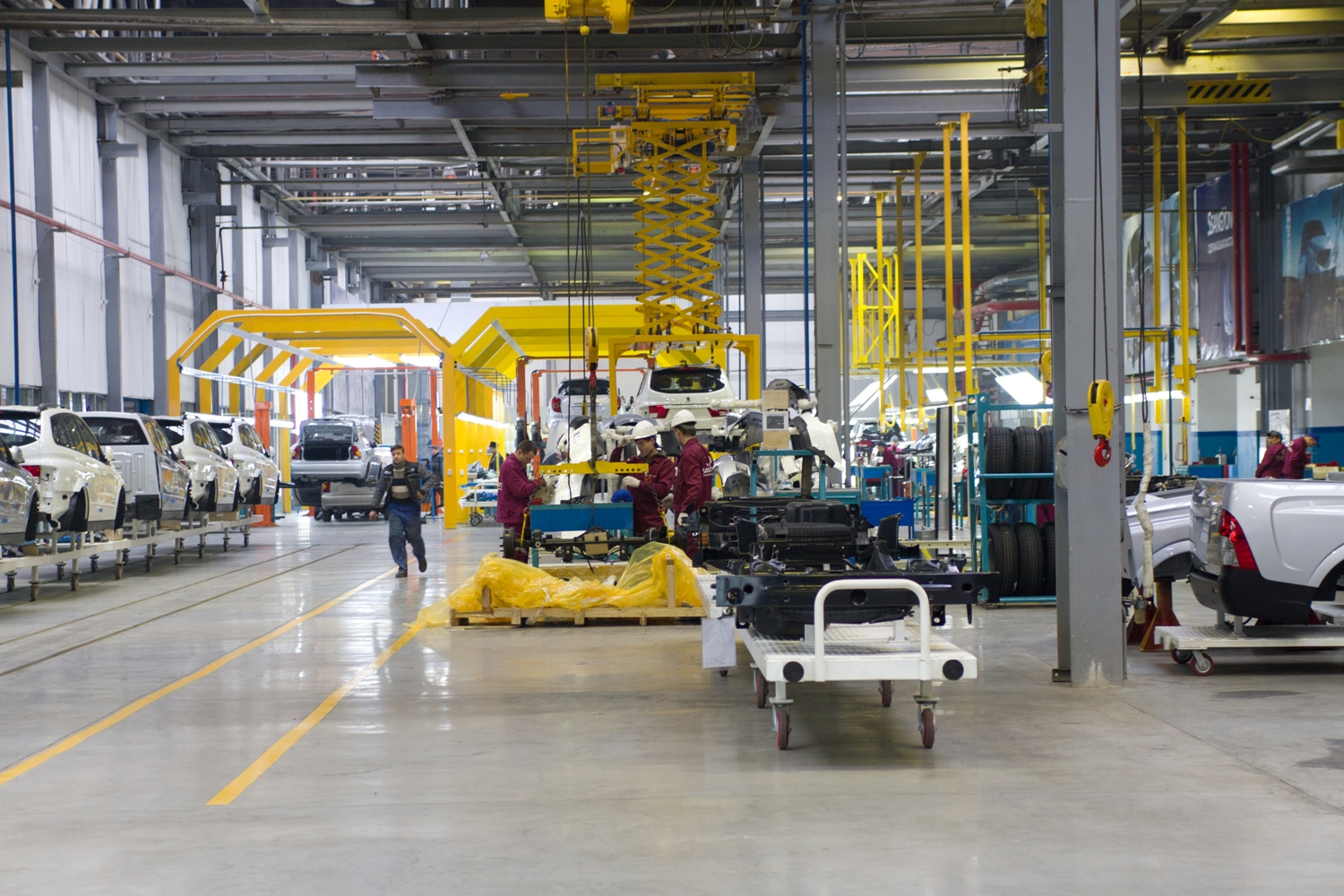
Assembly of SsangYong and ZAZ Chance in Kazakhstan

== Gallery ==
=== Currently produced cars and buses under ZAZ brand ===
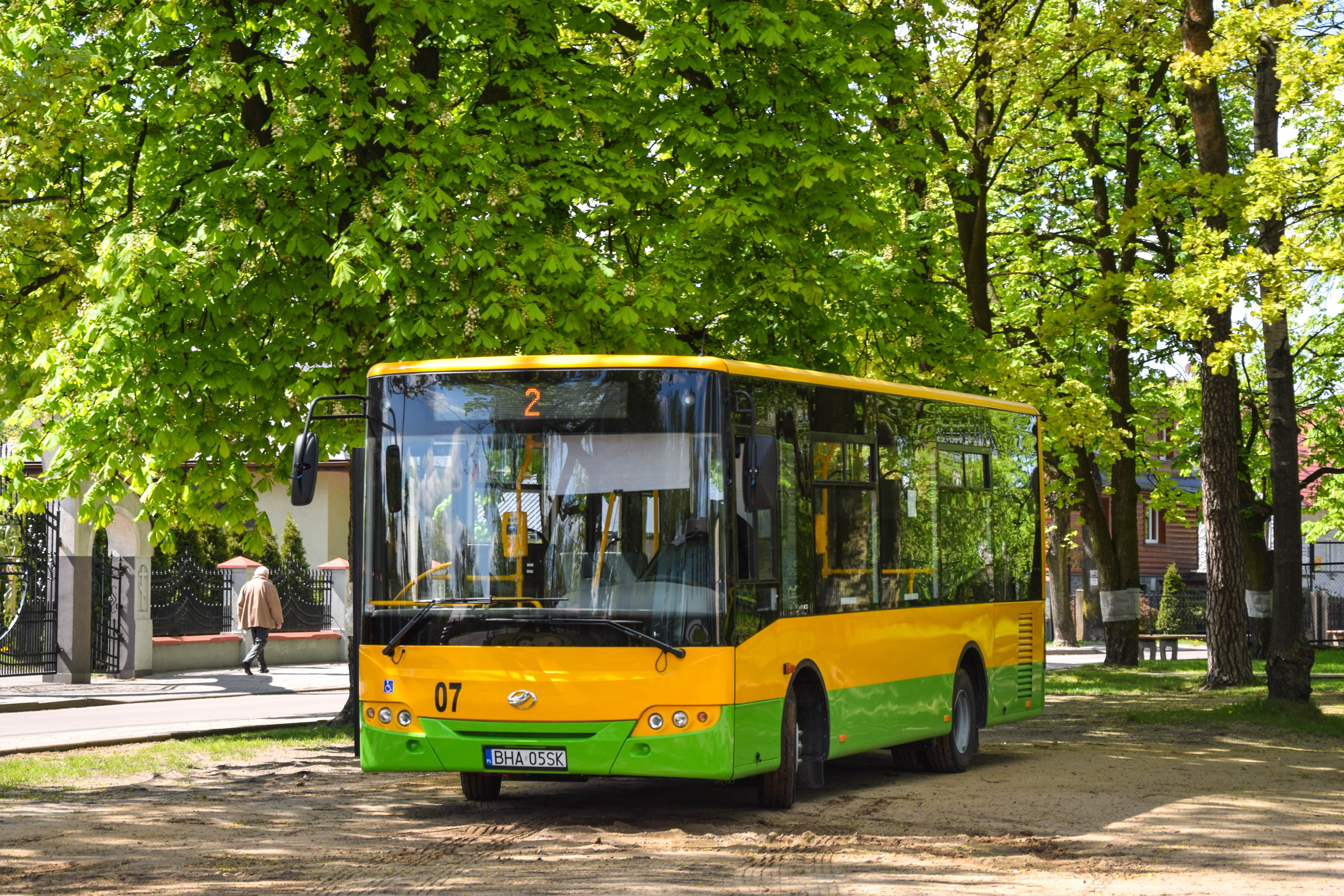
ZAZ-A10C I-Van bus (since 2008)

=== Older models ===
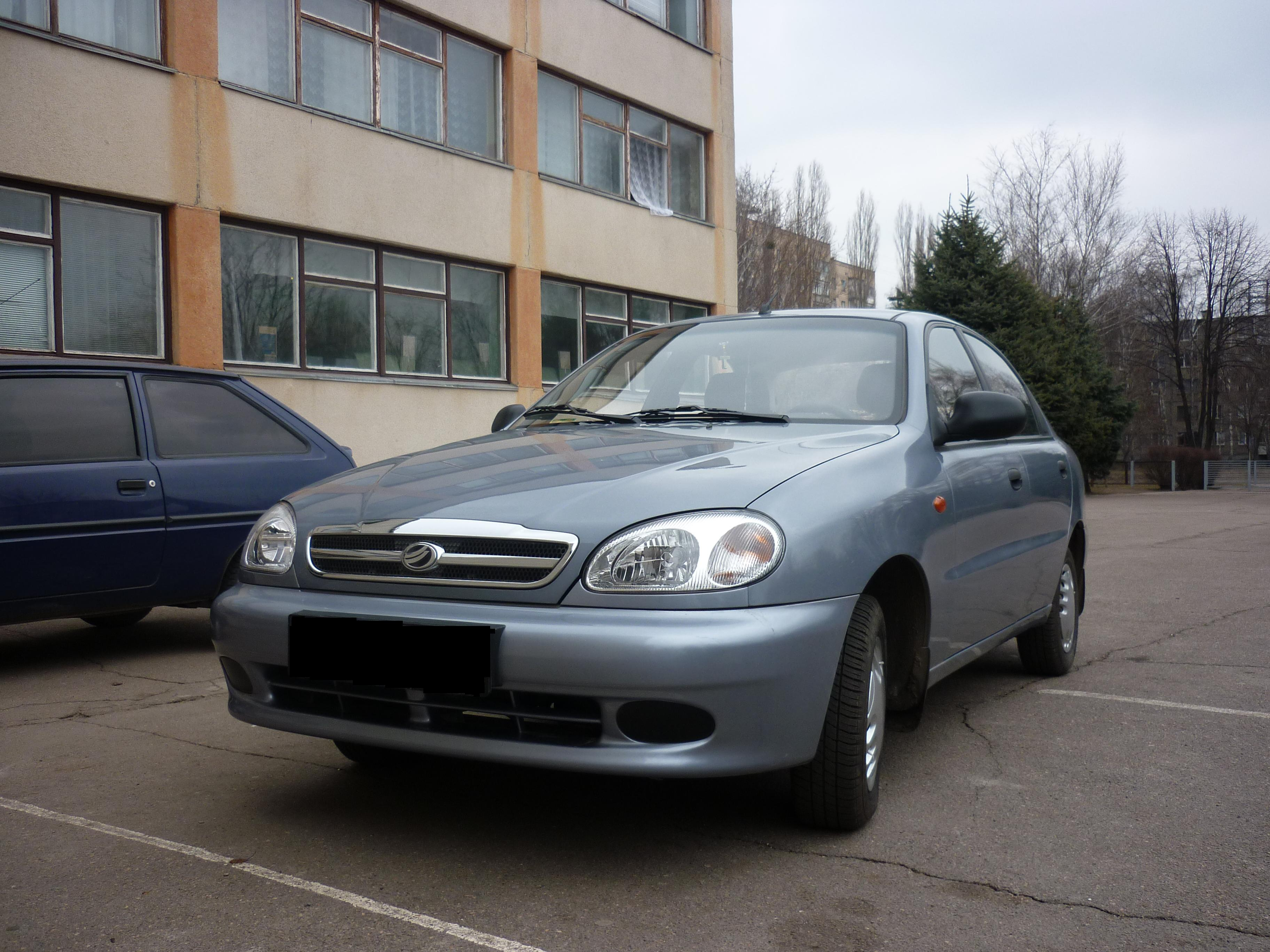
ZAZ Sens/Chance/Lanos (2005-2017)

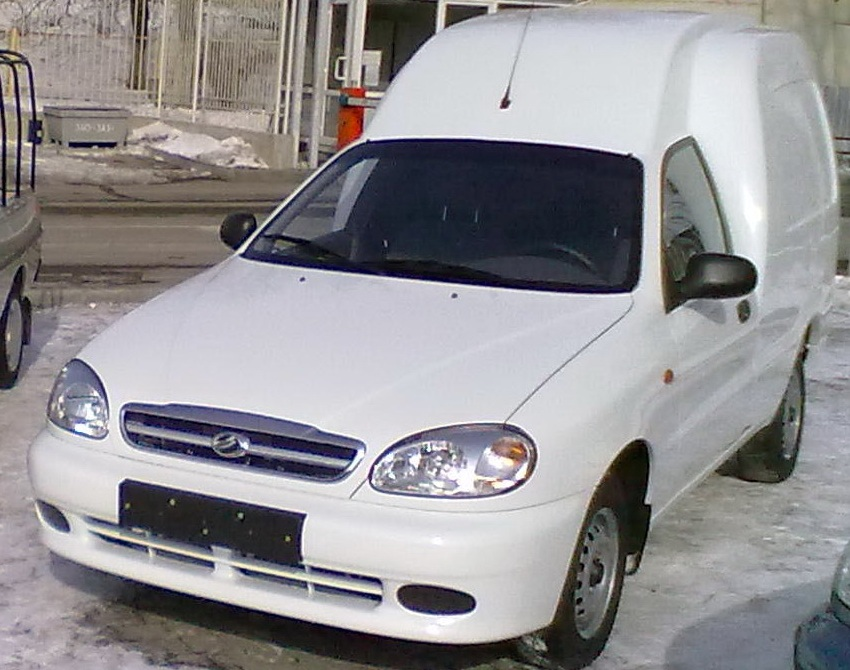
ZAZ Sens/Lanos Pick-up (2005-2017)

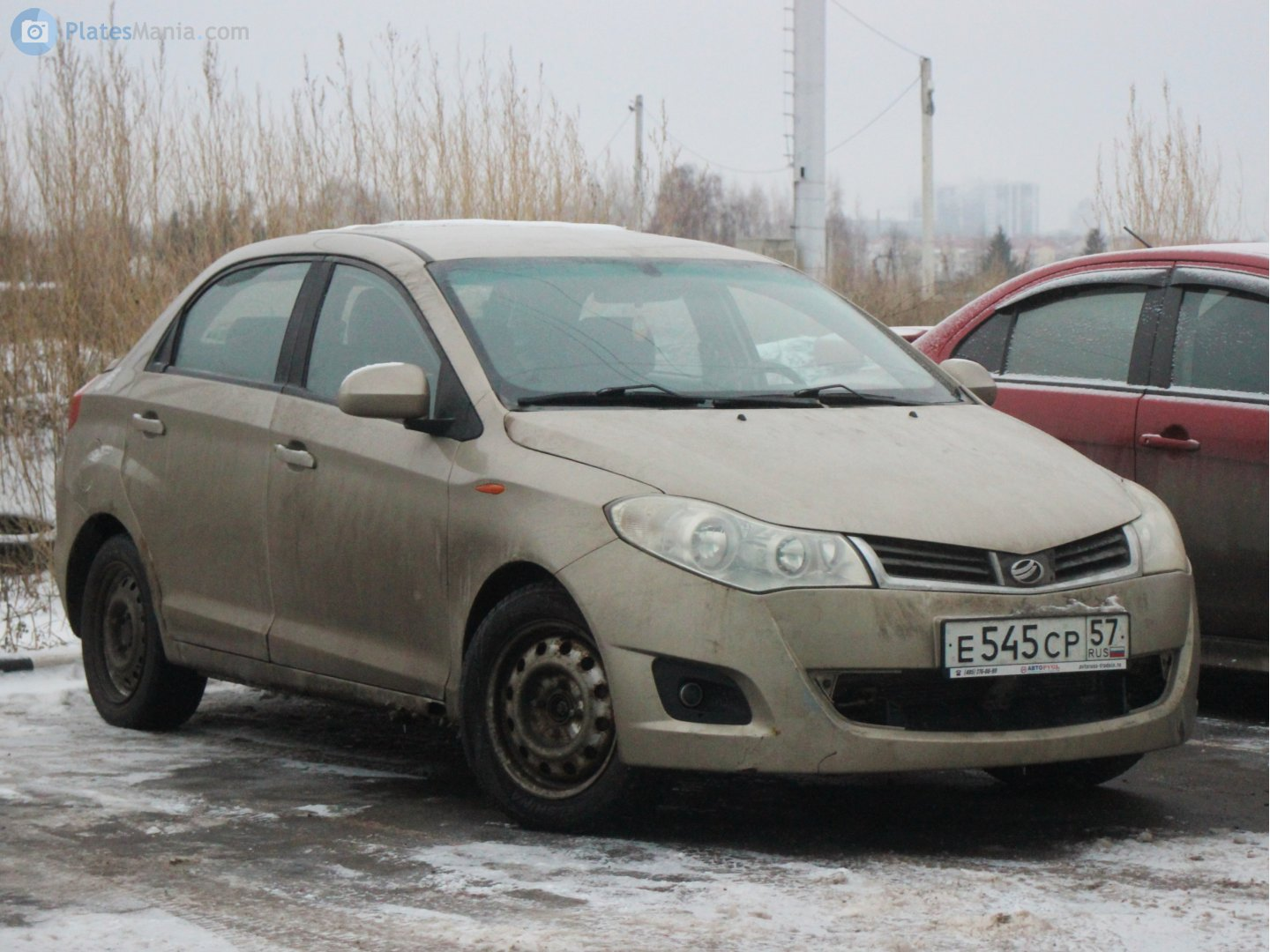
ZAZ Forza (2010-2014)

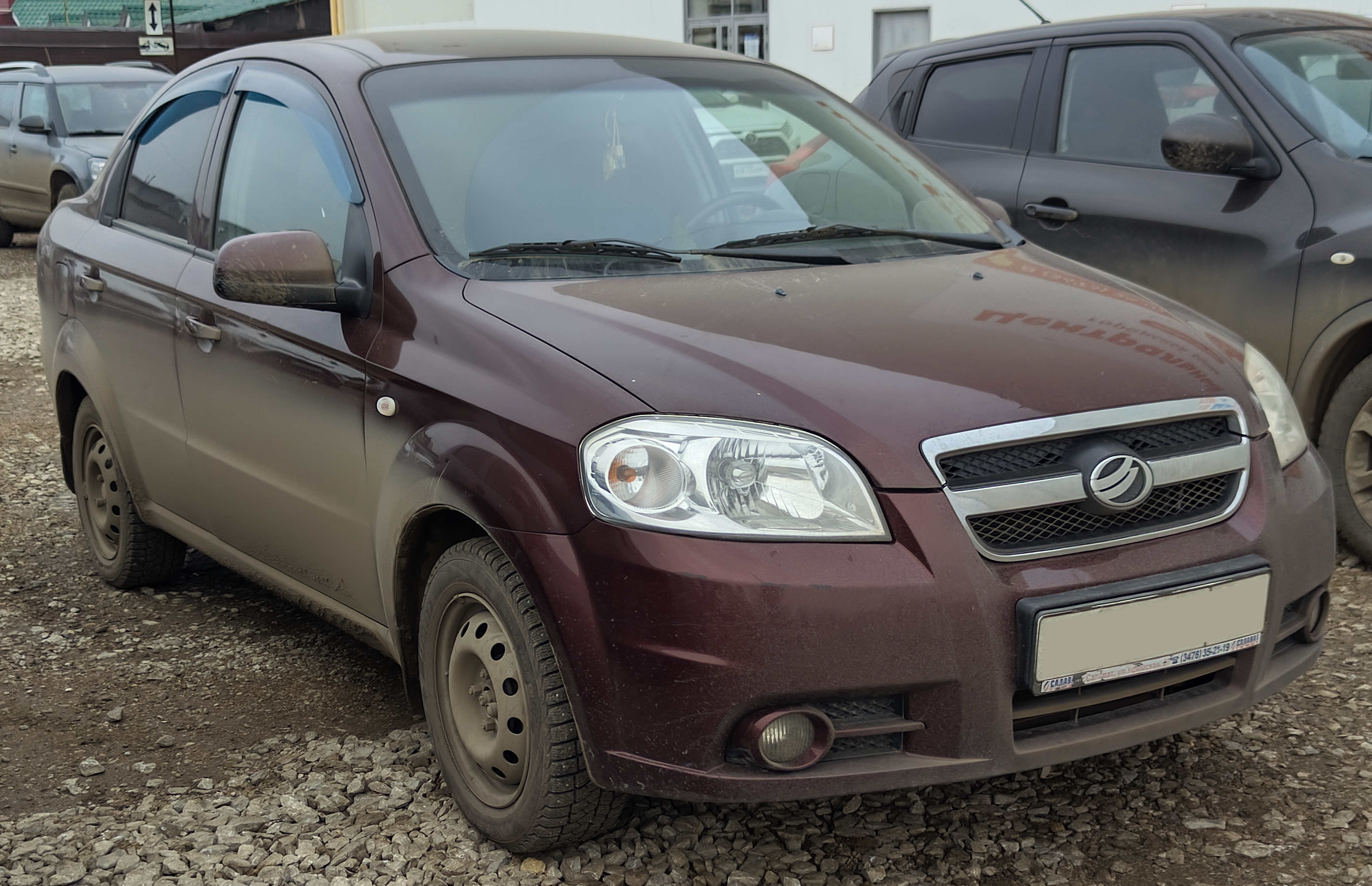
ZAZ Vida (2012-2014)

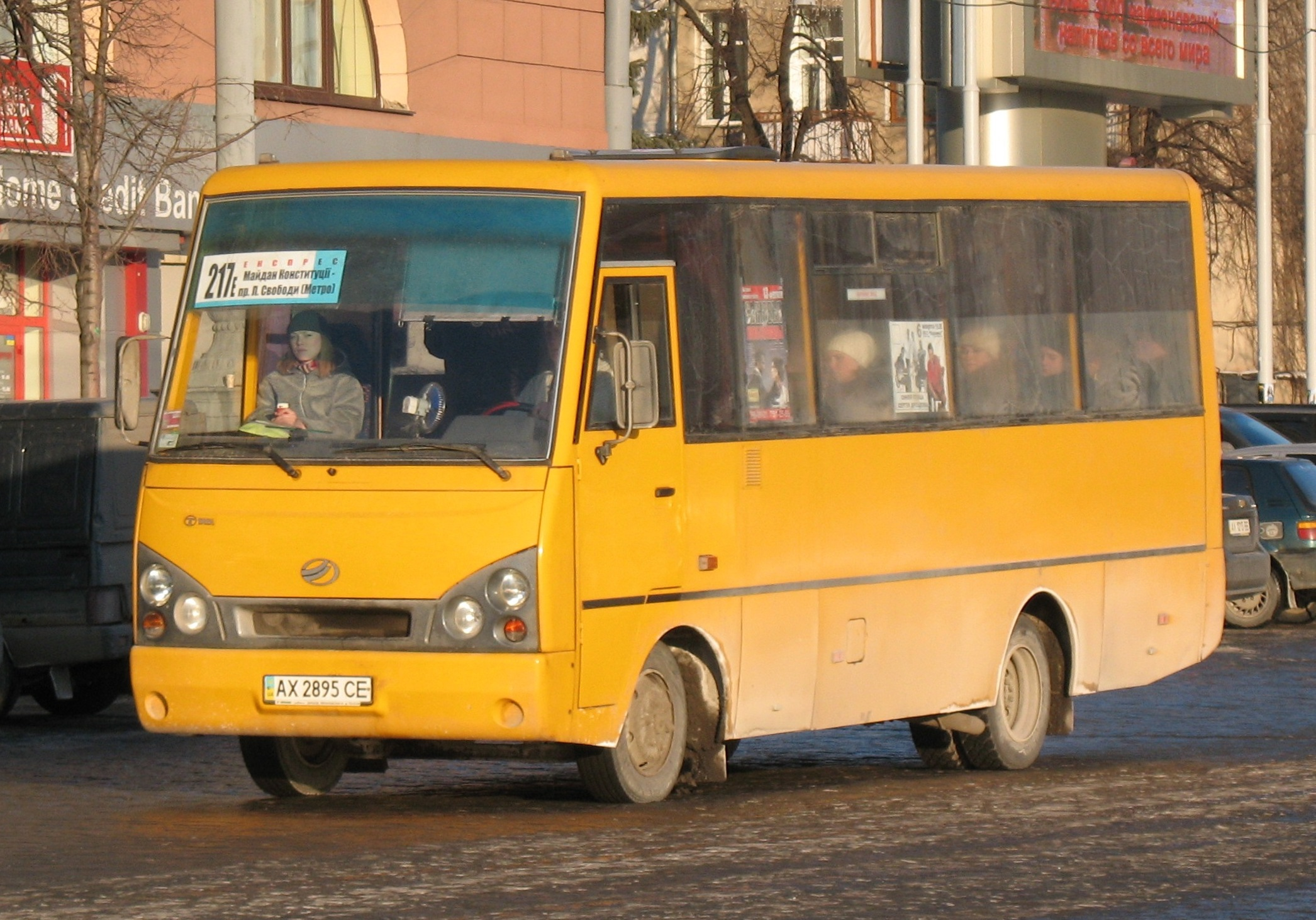
ZAZ-A07A I-Van bus (2005-2021)

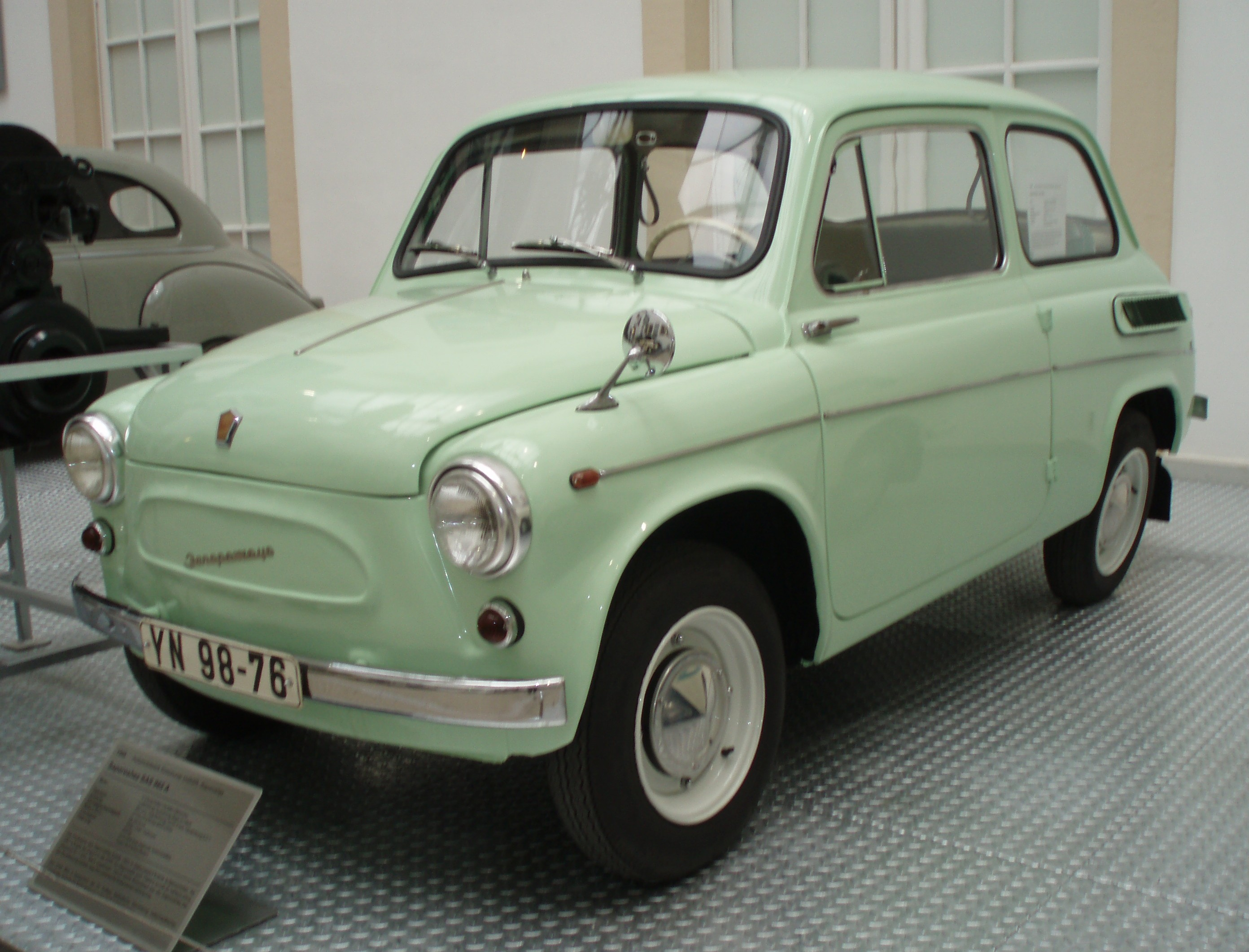
ZAZ-965A Zaporozhets (1960–1969)

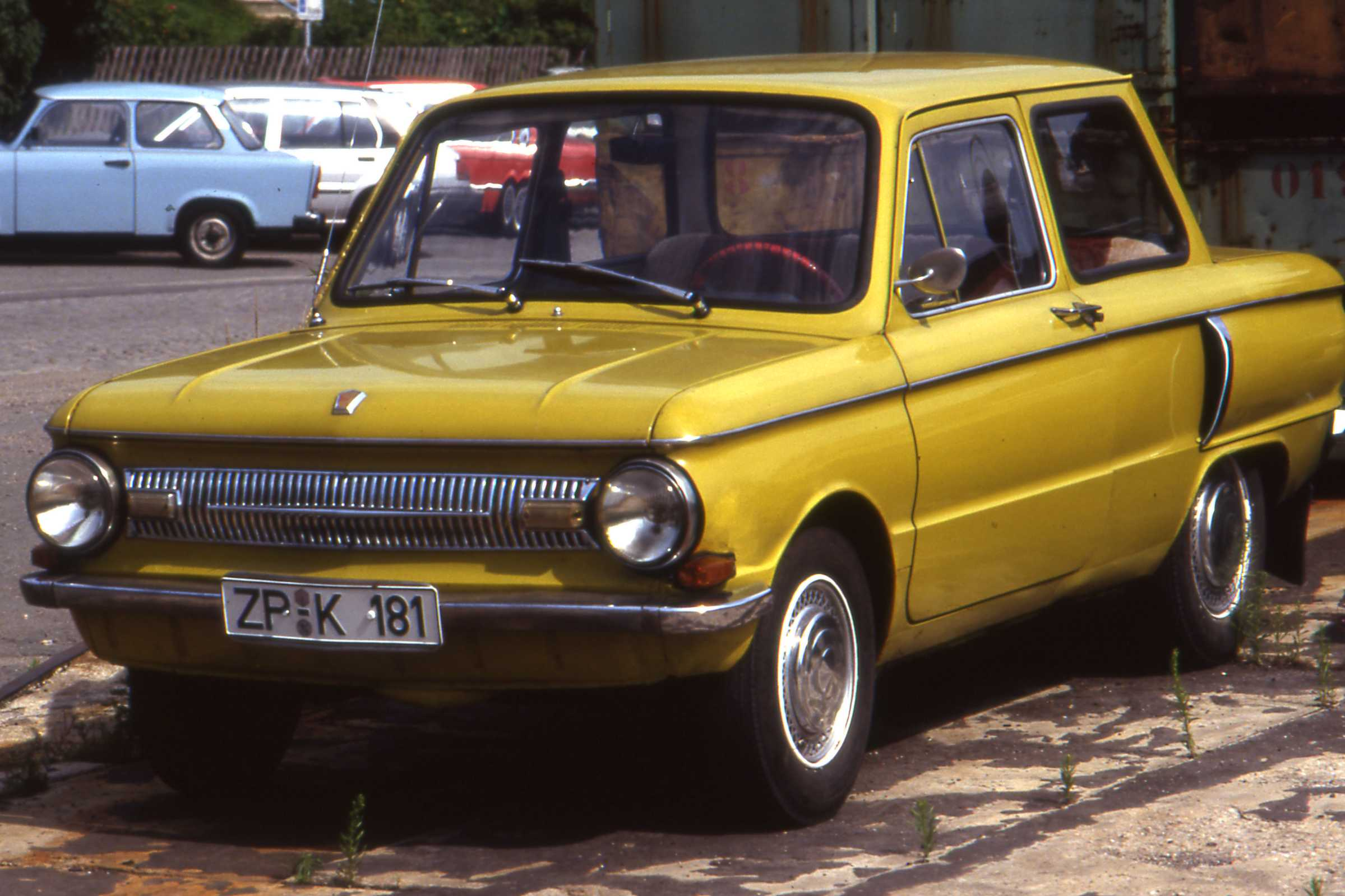
ZAZ-966 Zaporozhets (1967–1972)

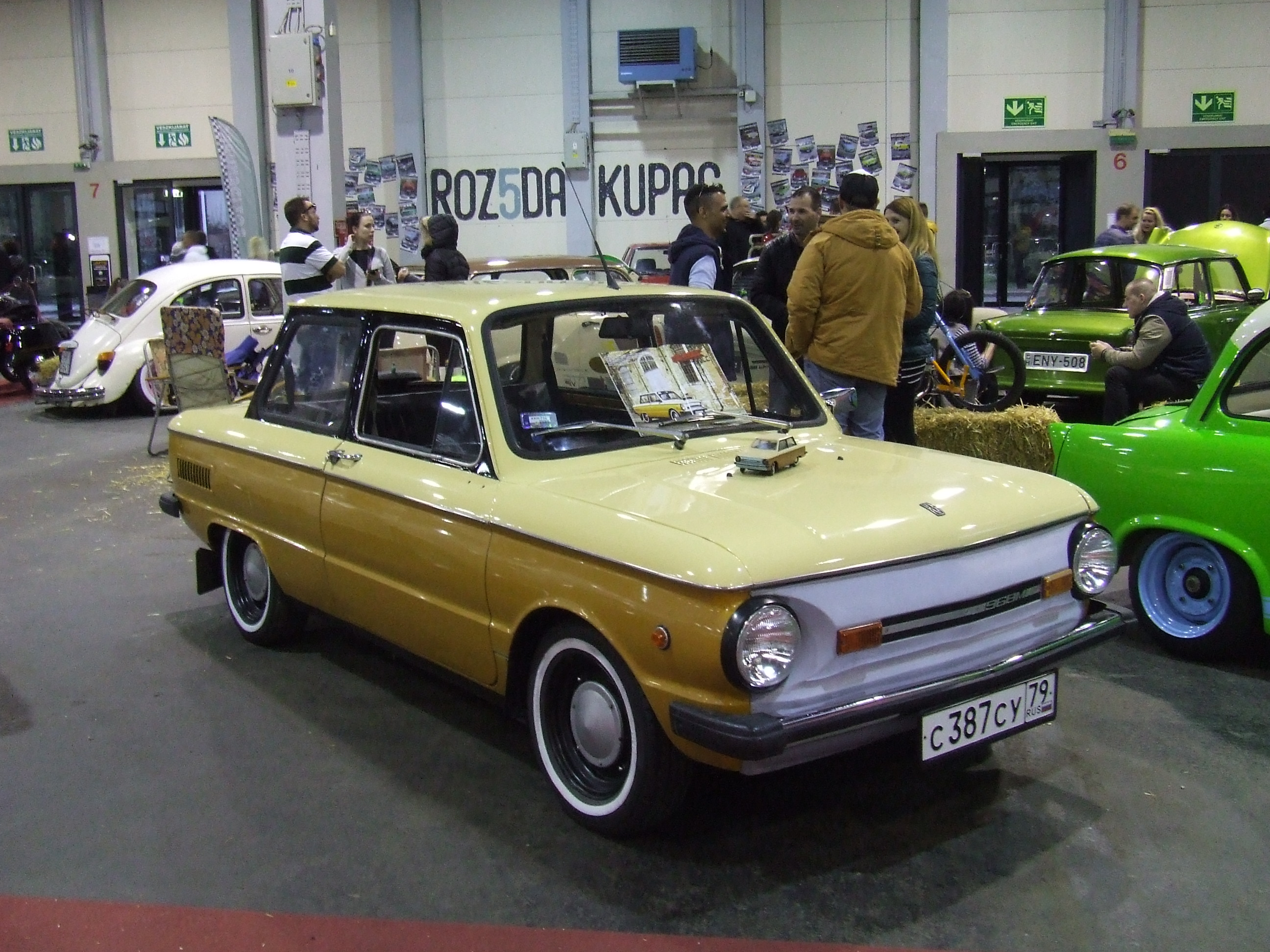
ZAZ-968M Zaporozhets (1972–1994)

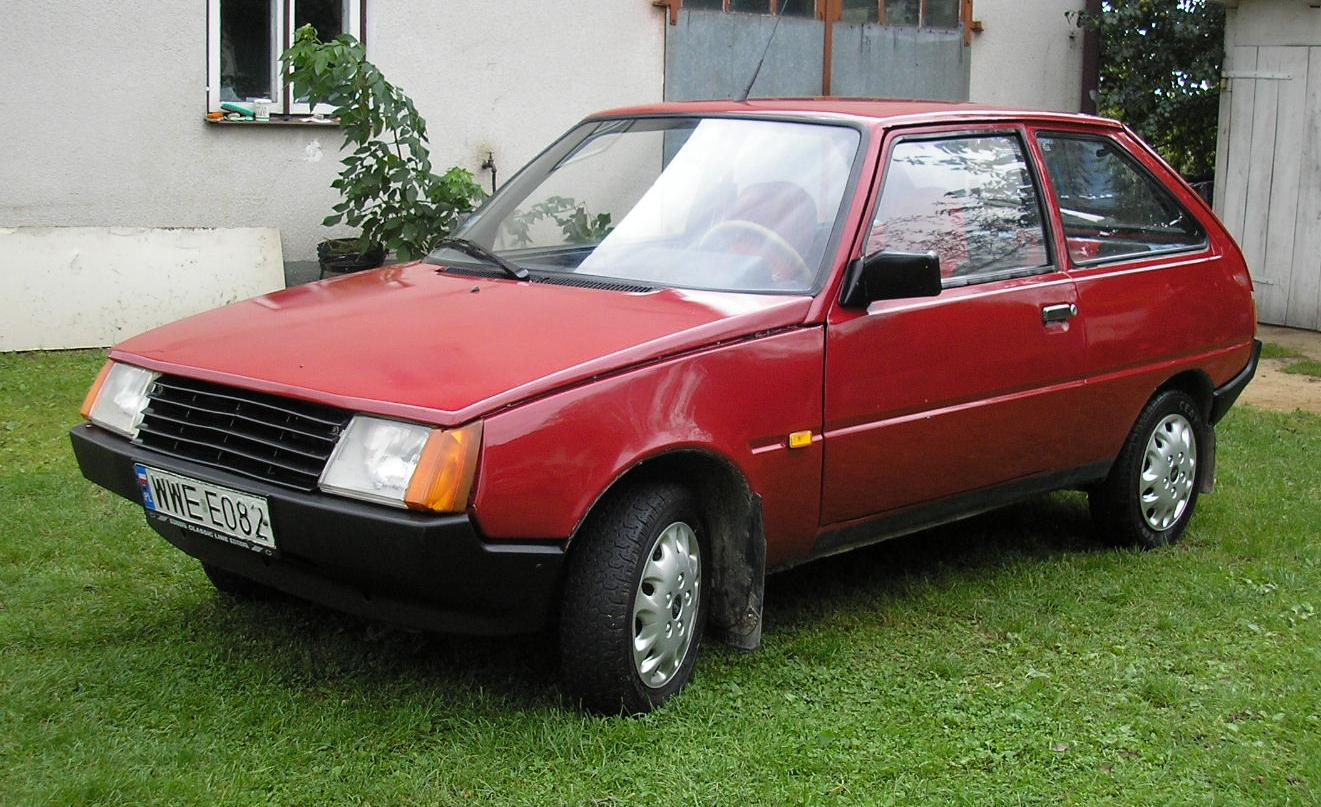
ZAZ-1102 Tavria (1989–1997)

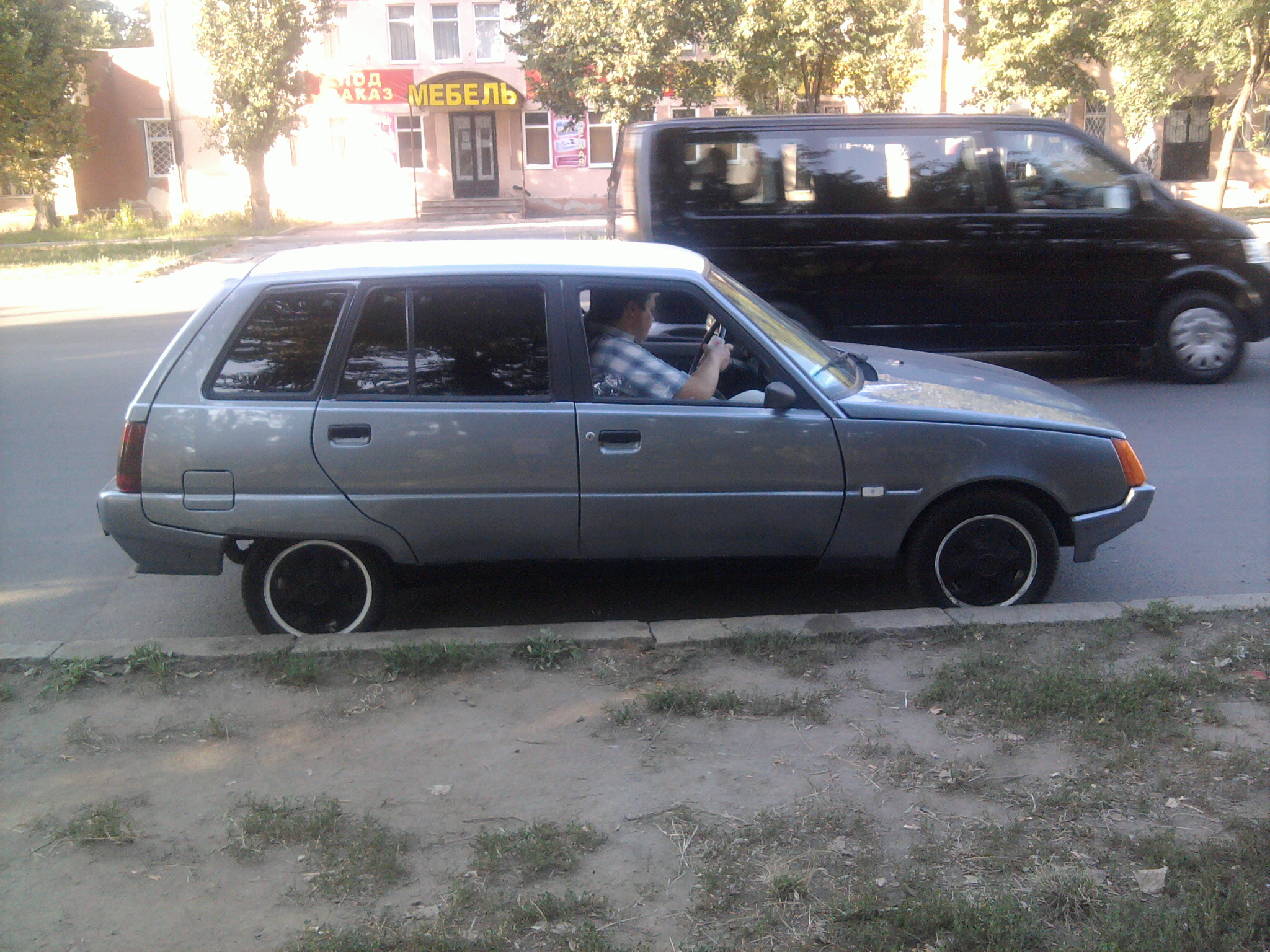
ZAZ-1105 Dana (1994–1997)

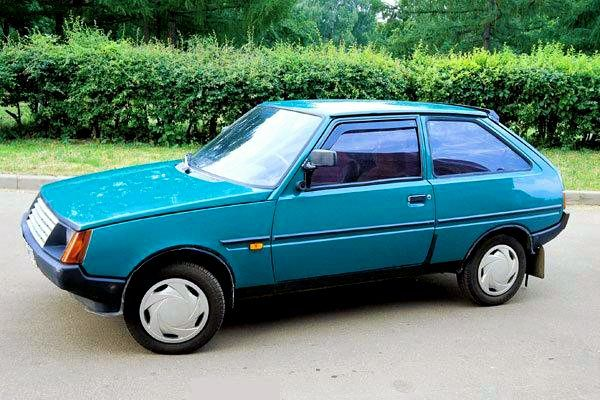
ZAZ-1102 Tavria Nova (1998–2007)

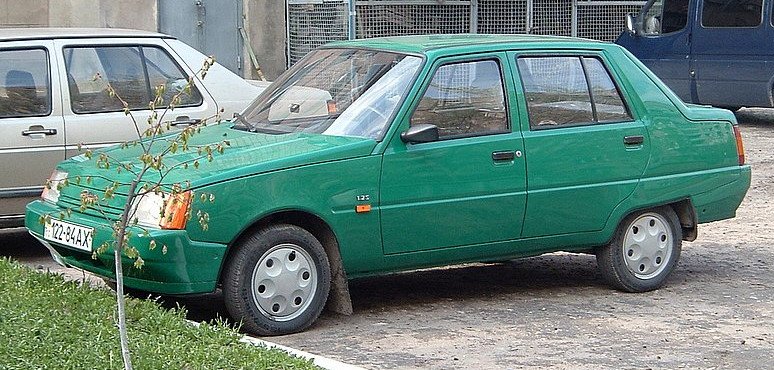
ZAZ-1103 Slavuta (1998–2011)

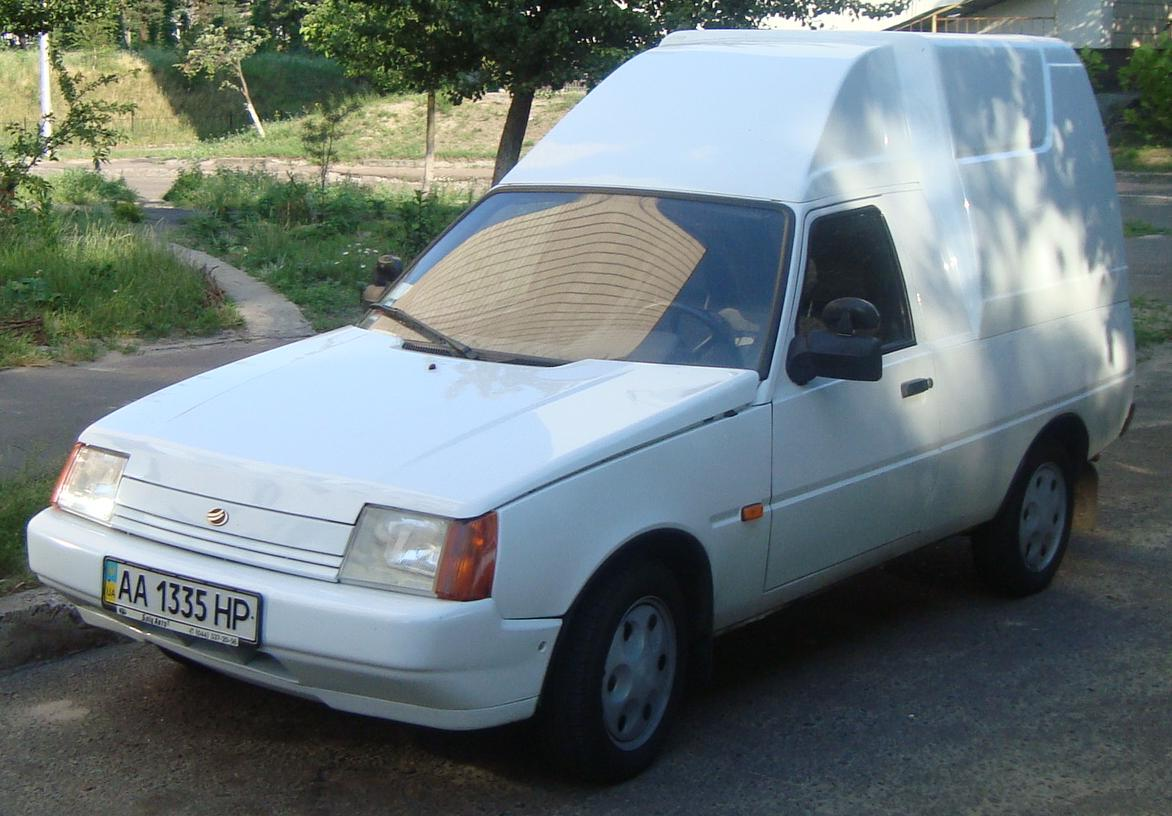
ZAZ-11055 Tavria Pick-up (1998–2011)

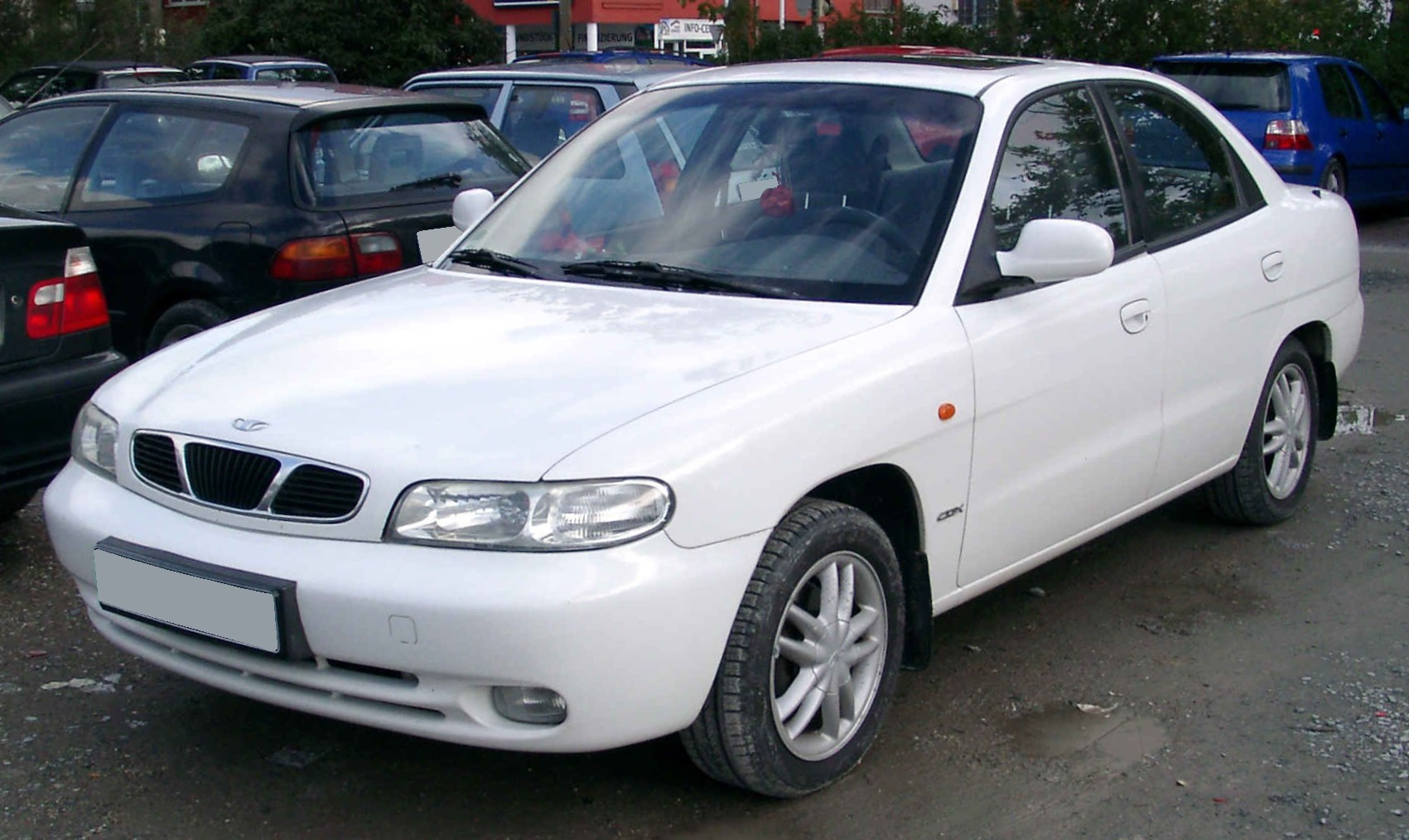
Daewoo Nubira (1998–2001)

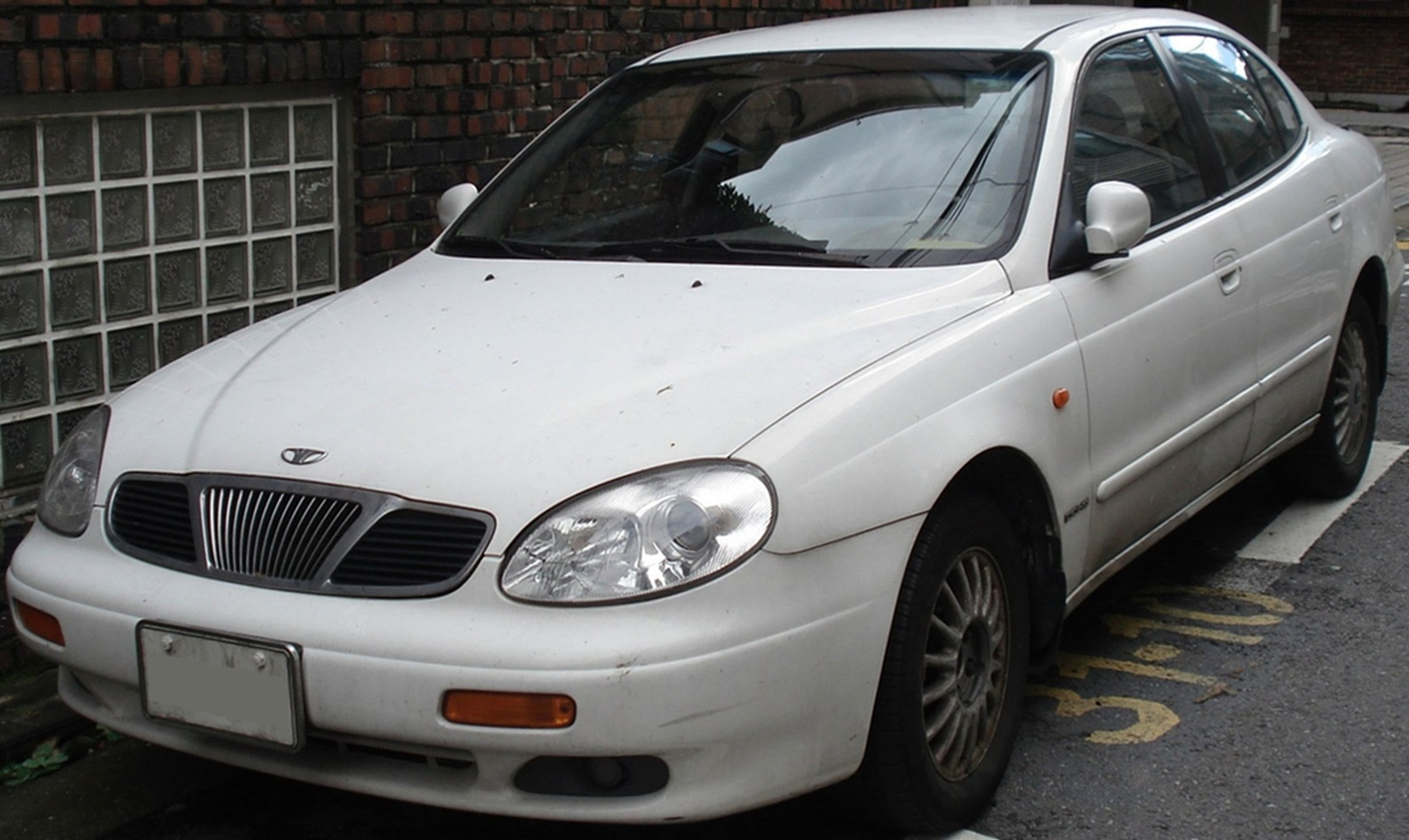
Daewoo Leganza (1998–2001)

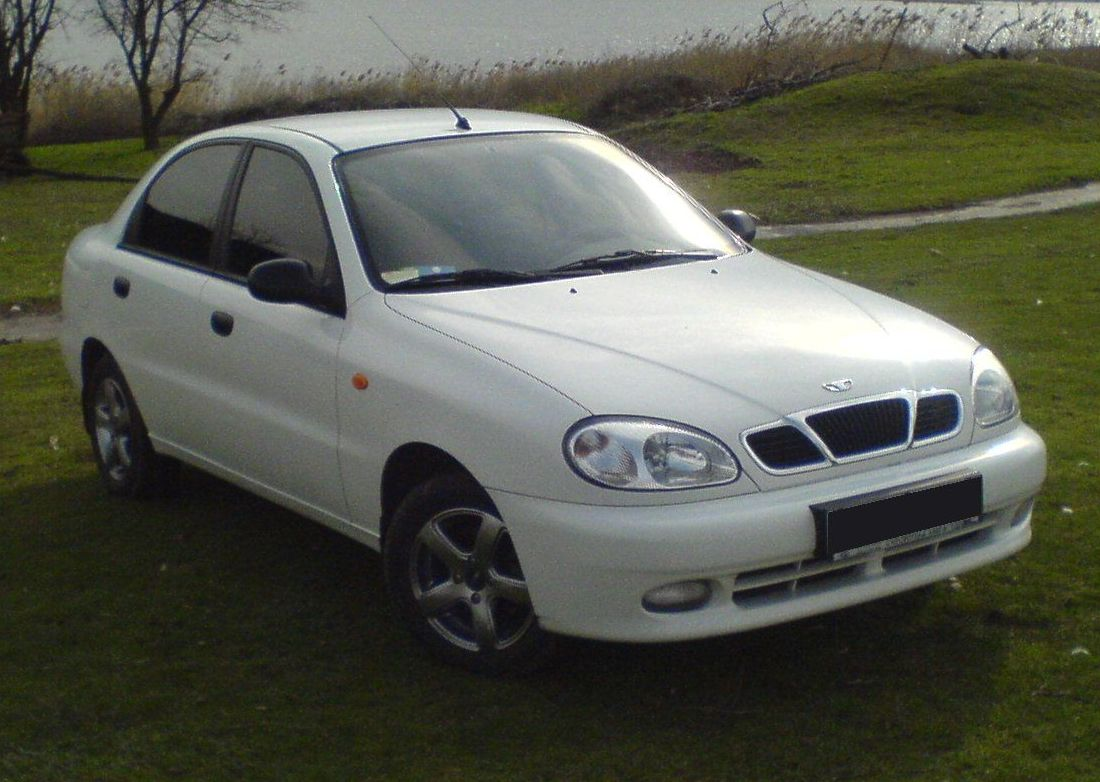
Daewoo Sens/Lanos (1998-2005)

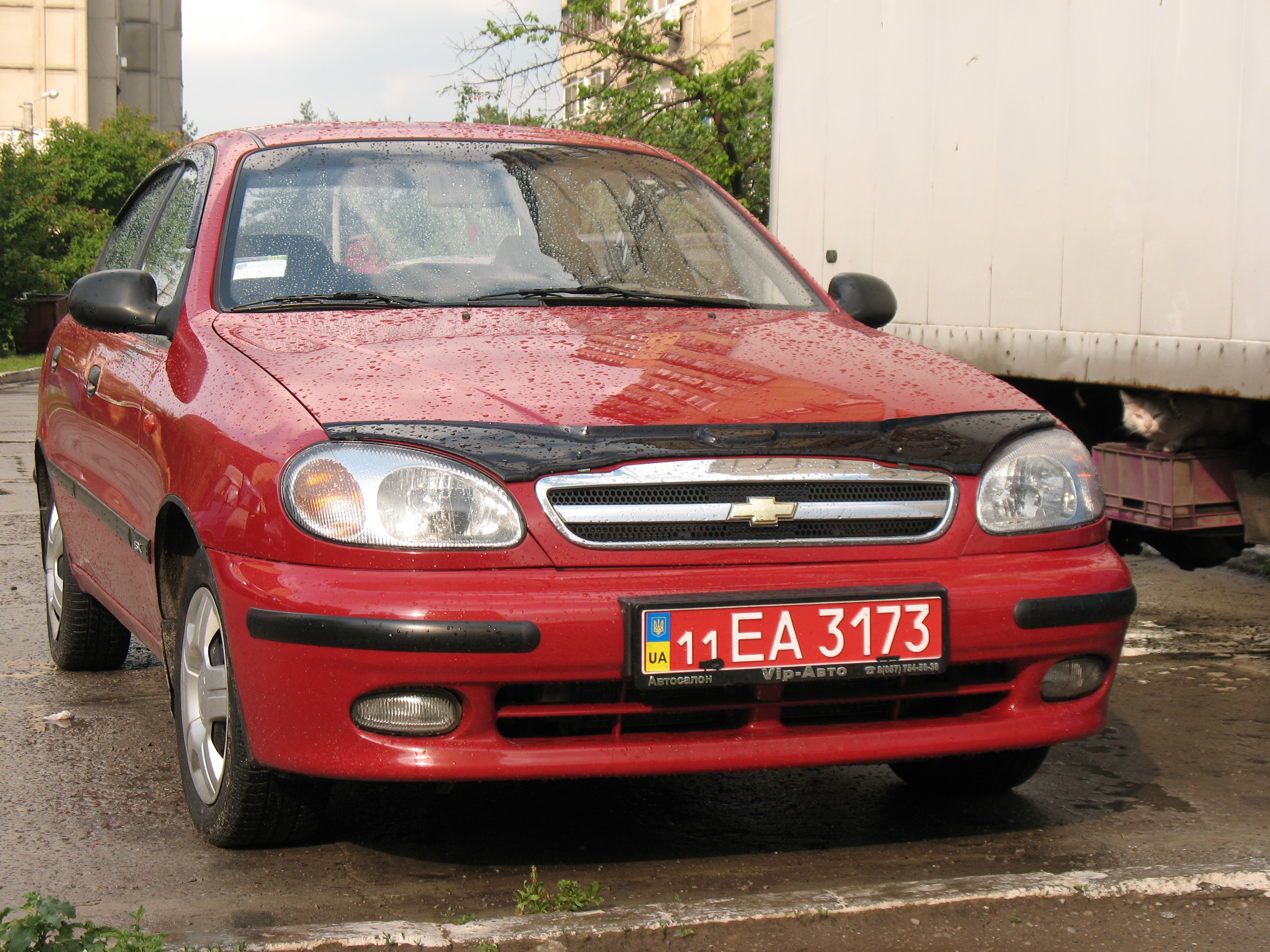
Chevrolet Lanos (2008-2012)

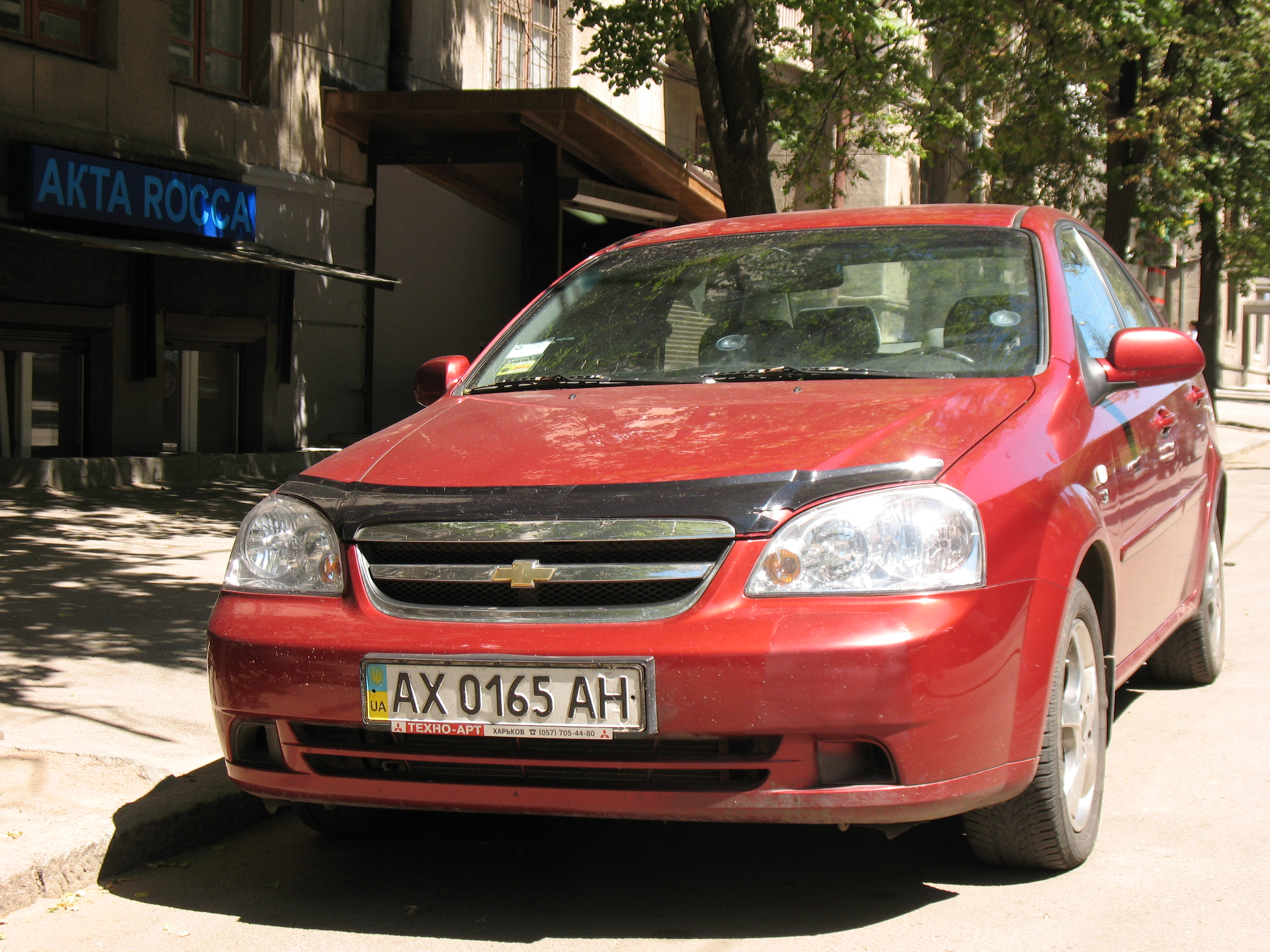
Chevrolet Lacetti (2003-2012)
