= LuAZ-1302 =

ZAZ-969; LuAZ-969; LuAZ-969M; LuAZ-1302
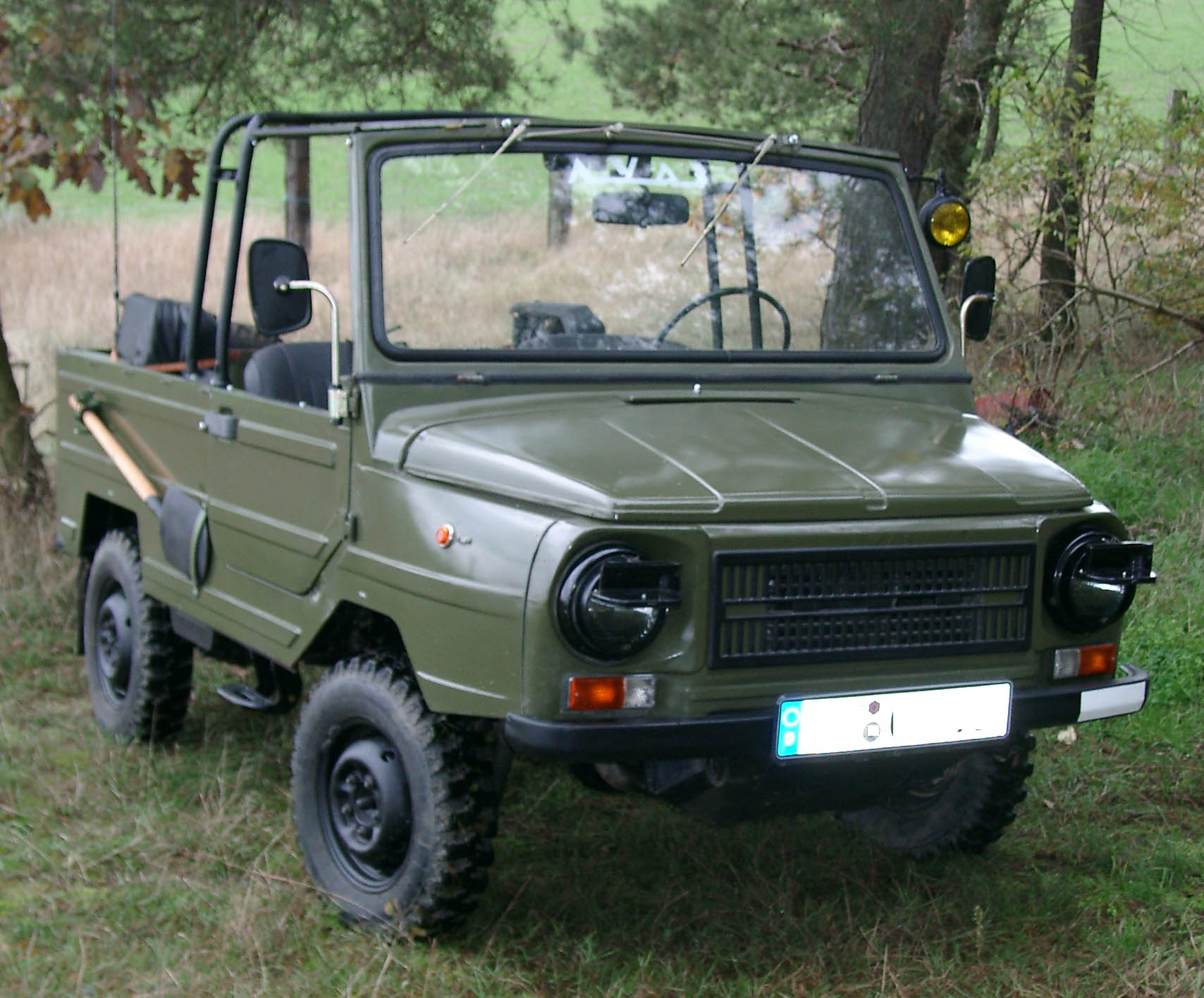
- LuAZ-969

Overview
- Manufacturer: ZAZ (1966-1971); LuAZ (1971–2002)
- Also called: ZAZ-969 (1966–1971); LuAZ-969 (1971–1979); LuAZ-969M (1979–1992)
- Production: 1966–2002
- Assembly: Soviet Union / Ukraine: Lutsk

Body and chassis
- Class: Off-road vehicle
- Layout: FF (1966–1971); F4 (1971–2002)

Powertrain
- Engine: 887 cc MeMZ-966 V4 (1966–1992); 1.2L MeMZ-969A V4 (1971–1992); 1.1L MeMZ-245-20 I4 (1992–2002)
- Transmission: 4-speed manual

Dimensions
- Wheelbase: 1,800 mm (70.9 in)
- Length: 3,270 mm (128.7 in)
- Width: 1,600 mm (63.0 in)
- Height: 1,790 mm (70.5 in)
- Kerb weight: 1,340 kg (2,954 lb)

Chronology
- Successor: LuAZ-1301 (cancelled)

The LuAZ-1302, formerly called ZAZ-969 (1966–1971), LuAZ-969 (1971–1979) and LuAZ-969M (1979–1992), is a Soviet and Ukrainian four-wheel drive automobile built by the ZAZ and LuAZ. The first Soviet vehicle with front wheel drive, it was based on the LuAZ-967.

== Development ==
Developing ideas from the unbuilt Moskvitch 415 prototype, designers used the LuAZ-967 as a basis for a four-wheel drive vehicle. They added a body to the LuAZ's bare form, and fitted a 30 hp (22 kW; 30 PS) 887 cc (54.1 cu in) MeMZ-966 air-cooled four-cylinder engine. No other mechanical changes were made.

Its pioneering (for a Soviet car) front wheel drive was due to a lack of drivable rear axles from the supplier, which was giving priority to the LuAZ-967. Nevertheless, the ZAZ-969 performed well, with a weight of only 1,340 kg (2,950 lb) (thanks in part to a soft top) and an 1,800 mm (71 in) wheelbase. The transmission was a four-speed manual.

== Production ==
A pre-production batch of fifty was created in 1965, dubbed ZAZ-969, and production was authorized in 1966 as the ZAZ-969V. It was built by ZAZ until 1971, when LuAZ took over. When LuAZ took over production (making it the LuAZ-969), four-wheel drive became standard. In 1975, the LuAZ-969A replaced the original LuAZ-969, offering a new 40 hp (30 kW; 41 PS) 1,197 cc (73.0 cu in) MeMZ-969 four-cylinder engine. It survived until 1979. This was followed by a hard-top panel van version in 1977, known as the LuAZ-969F, with a 400 kg (880 lb) payload, which was only built in small quantities.

LuAZ began developing a replacement for the LuAZ-969A in 1974, the LuAZ-969M; it entered production in 1979. It was named Volin, for the region around Lutsk (where the factory was located). It retained the 40 hp (30 kW; 41 PS) engine, but changed to disk brakes with servo assist. Door locks were added. Folding windshield was standard.

Exports were limited, though it proved popular in Italy, where Martorelli also offered it with a Ford engine.

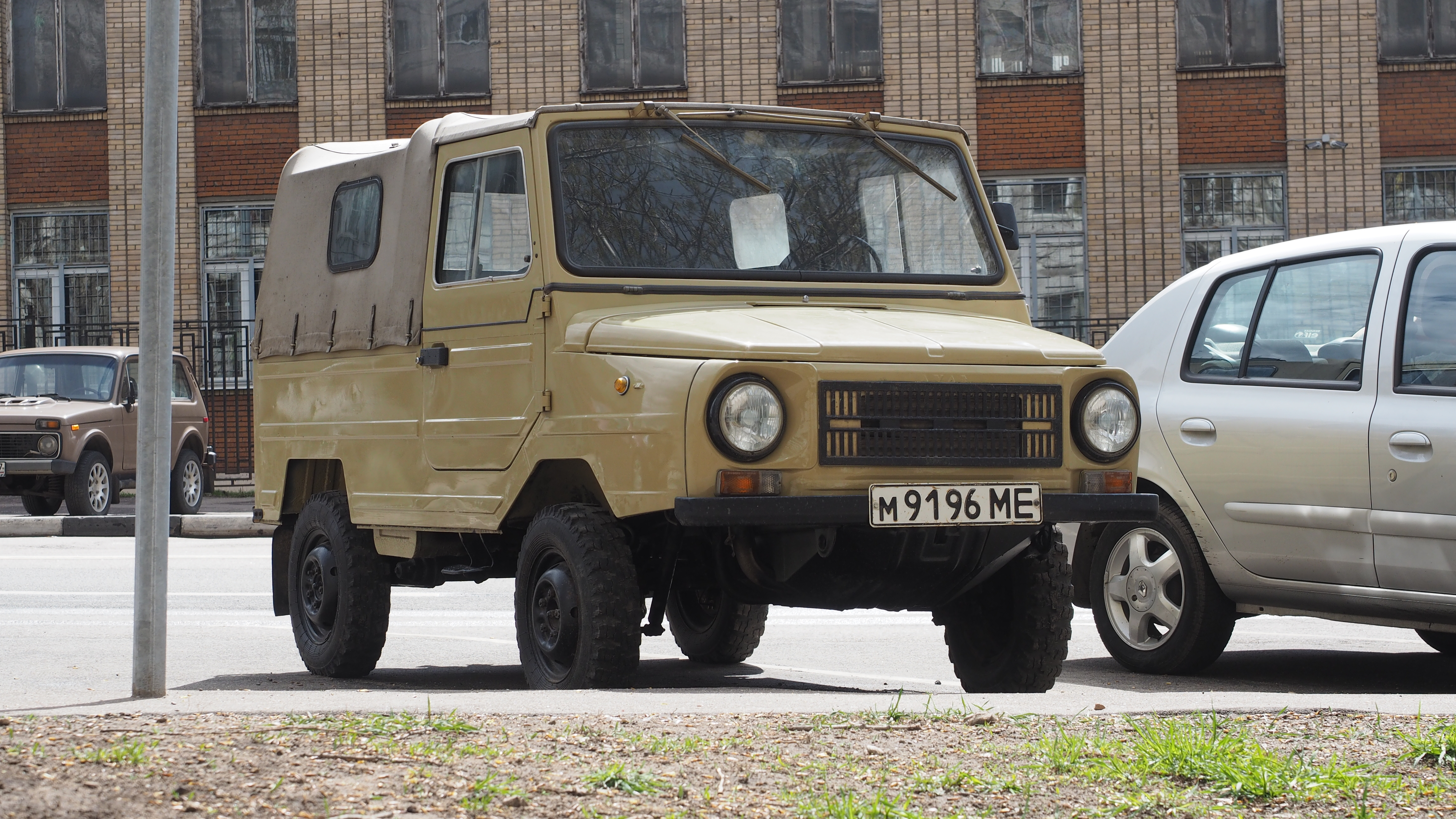
LuAZ-969M

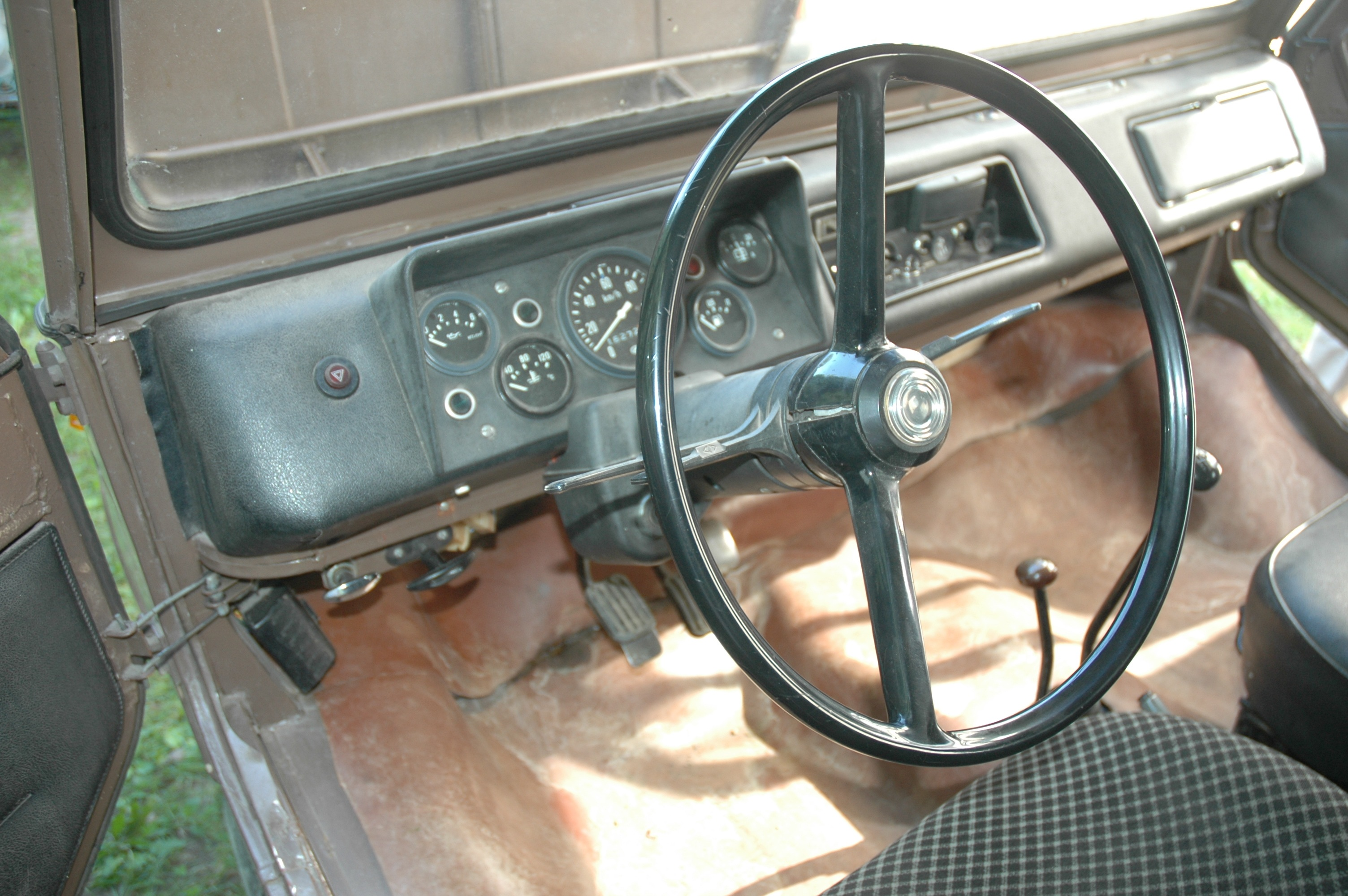
LuAZ-969M (interior)

== Sources ==
- Thompson, Andy (2008). Cars of the Soviet Union. Haynes Publishing. ISBN 978-1844254835.
