= UKRAVTO Group =

Ukrainian corporation

UKRAVTO GROUP Ukrainian Automobile Corporation
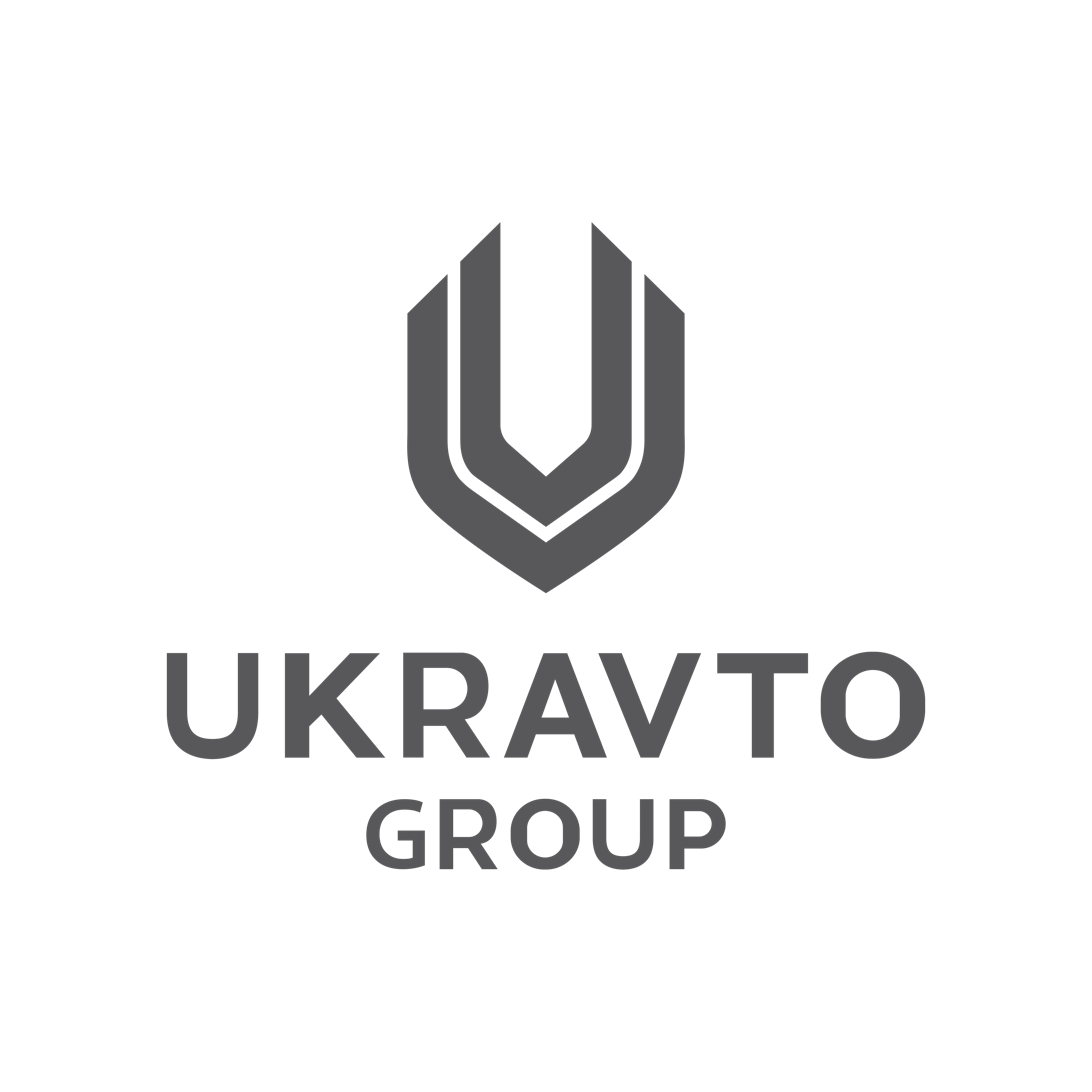
- Company type: Privately held company
- Industry: Automotive
- Founded: 1969
- Headquarters: Kyiv, Ukraine
- Key people: Tariel Vasadze as President
- Products: Automobiles
- Services: Trading and service
- Parent: UKRAVTO GROUP
- Subsidiaries: Avtokapital
- Website: ukravto.ua

UKRAVTO GROUP (Ukrainian Automobile Corporation JSC) is a multinational company, distributor and service provider in Ukraine. UKRAVTO GROUP is the only car manufacturer in Ukraine with full-scale production capability. The owner, Honorary President / Chairman of the Board is Tariel Vasadze.

== History ==
=== 1969–1989 ===
UKRAVTO GROUP history traces back to the establishment of the Main Department of Vehicle Maintenance and Repair in 1969, which then included 7 regional production departments and about 50 service centers. Later, it was reorganized into the Ukrainian Rental Production Association called Avtoservis. It included 7 regional centers, 25 regional enterprises, 105 service stations and 90 spare parts sales showrooms.

=== 1990–2000 ===
Since Ukraine's independence, the corporation underwent significant structural changes, transforming into an Open Joint-Stock Company in 1992. In the same year, Toyota and Nissan cars became officially available to Ukrainians in the UkrAVTO network.

In 1994, UKRAVTO became the exclusive importer of Mercedes-Benz cars and the representative of Daimler AG in Ukraine. In 1998, the distribution company ZIP-AVto was established to supply the network of car service centers with spare parts.

=== 2000-afterwards ===
In 2002, AvtoZAZ-Daewoo, the flagship of the Ukrainian automobile industry, a plant that produces cars in a full cycle — from sheet metal to the test track, became part of the Corporation. In 2003, after signing a distribution agreement with General Motors in 2003, the Ukrainian Automobile Corporation has begun to produce Opel and Chevrolet on its assembly line.

In 2004, UKRAVTO concluded an agreement on the distribution and later on the production of Chery brand cars. In 2005, the FSO factory for the production of auto components in Warsaw (Poland) joined the Corporation. In the same year, full-scale production of Chevrolet Lanos cars was launched at ZAZ.

In 2008, the company began KIA cars distribution, as well as joint production of Chevrolet Aveo with General Motors at FSO. In 2011, ZAZ started production of ZAZ Forza under Chery's license, and in 2012—ZAZ Vida under General Motors' license.

In 2013, UKRAVTO Corporation began distributing the Italian brands Ducati and Maserati. On December 1, 2021, the Ukrainian Automobile Corporation signed a distribution agreement with the Chinese auto giant Geely to return the brand back to Ukraine.

Since 1994, the Ukrainian Automobile Corporation has sold more than 1,400,000 cars. Over the past 10 years, from 2013 to 2023, almost 2,500,000 cars have undergone maintenance and repair services through the UKRAVTO network in Ukraine.

In 2023, UKRAVTO facilitated the return of the South Korean brand SsangYong to the Ukrainian market under its new name KG Mobility, with a completely new lineup of SUVs.

In July 2024, Ukrainian Automobile Corporation LLC started operating as a national network of UKRAVTO GROUP. Following the parent company, all the dealerships belonging to UKRAVTO GROUP throughout Ukraine changed their names, and now they are called “Automobile House UKRAVTO Ukraine”, “Autosamit UKRAVTO”, “UKRAVTO Holosiivskyi”, “UKRAVTO Kyiv”, “UKRAVTO Lviv”, “UKRAVTO Dnipro”, “UKRAVTO Odesa” and others.

== Production ==
In 1998, after the modernization of the Zaporizhzhia Automobile Building Plant, the company began to produce Lanos, Nubira, Leganza and modernized Tavria cars, which were in high demand on the Ukrainian car market. Since 2002, ZAZ is fully controlled by the UKRAVTO GROUP. The plant's capacity is designed for the full-scale production of about 150,000 cars annually. It is highly recognized by its potential world-known partners: among its produced models are those of the GM DAT and Opel AG concerns. Car production at ZAZ facilities is provided by approximately 500 different suppliers of equipment and components (roughly 400 are Ukrainian ones, with 100 others being foreign enterprises). The production facilities of the plant consist of pressing, welding, painting and assembly plants, as well as advanced capacities for car components production. Currently, the plant produces modern buses of urban, suburban and school modifications: A08 urban low-floor, suburban and school, A10 urban low-floor, which are in great demand in Ukraine.

== Car service ==
The network of car service centers of the UKRAVTO GROUP has a monthly flow of 15,000 cars serviced according to the technological requirements and standards of manufacturers with the appropriate diagnostic equipment and specialized tools at its own dealerships located throughout Ukraine.

=== Car body repair ===
UKRAVTO GROUP cooperates with the TOP-20 insurance companies. In recent years, 20,000 cars have been provided with restoration services. The group has its own insurance company called Express Insurance, which allows receiving road accident reports, conducting car inspection and calculating and agreeing repairs with an insurance company all in one place.

== Divisions and subsidiaries ==
- Distribution in Ukraine: Avtokapital (Mercedes-Benz), Falcon-Auto (KIA), Grand Avtomotiv (Maserati, Ducati), AUTO MOTOR GROUP (Chery, Jetour), Grand Avtomotiv (Geely), Universal Motors Group (KGM, ZAZ buses).
- Authorized dealer for Toyota, Nissan, Renault, Opel, Peugeot.
- UKRAVTO GROUP owns a dealer network consisting of more than 50 car showrooms: Mercedes-Benz, Maserati, KIA, Chery, GEELY, Toyota, Renault, Nissan, Peugeot, Opel, KGM, Ducati motorcycles, ZAZ buses, etc. In addition, the group carries out specialized refurbishment repairs at its specialized centers and has multi-brand service centers.
- Distribution of Mercedes-Benz abroad: Autokapital-Azerbaijan (Mercedes-Benz), Grand Automobile Azerbaijan (Maserati), Autokapital-Kazakhstan (operating also in neighbouring Tajikistan, Kyrgyzstan, Turkmenistan: brand Mercedes-Benz), Mercedes-Benz Asia (Maserati), Autokapital-Uzbekistan (Mercedes-Benz).
- Sale of used cars: AvtoHIT.
- Production capacities: Zaporizhzhia Automobile Building Plant.
- Financial services: Express Insurance is an insurance company established in 2008. Express Credit offering credit terms from leading partner banks, as well as the execution of a credit agreement at UKRAVTO GROUP car dealerships. Vehicle leasing from Ukravtoleasing.
- Third-party logistics and freight forwarding: АСКО-ЕКСПЕДИЦІЯ (translates to ASKO-DISPATCHING).
- A network of warehouses in Kyiv and Odesa region. Central Logistics Center and Black Sea Logistics Center.
- Gas stations: Grand Petrol is a network of gas stations offering Lithuanian fuel produced by the Orlen Lietuva Refinery.
- Other areas of activity: Park-hotel Kidev, Ukrainian restaurant Pervak, multidisciplinary tour operator Hermes Travel Group.

== Products ==
- Mercedes-Benz
- Toyota
- Kia
- Chery
- Jetour
- Geely
- Renault
- Peugeot
- Maserati
- Opel
- Ducati
- ZAZ
- KGM (Ssang Yong)

== See also ==
- Bogdan Corporation
- Eurocar
