= Vashadze =

Vashadze (Georgian: ვაშაძე) is a Georgian surname, which may refer to:

- Giorgi Vashadze (born 1981), Georgian politician
- Grigol Vashadze (born 1958), Georgian politician and diplomat

== See also ==
- Vasadze (disambiguation), including people with the surname
