= Tariel Vasadze =

Ukrainian businessman and politician

- Таріел Васадзе
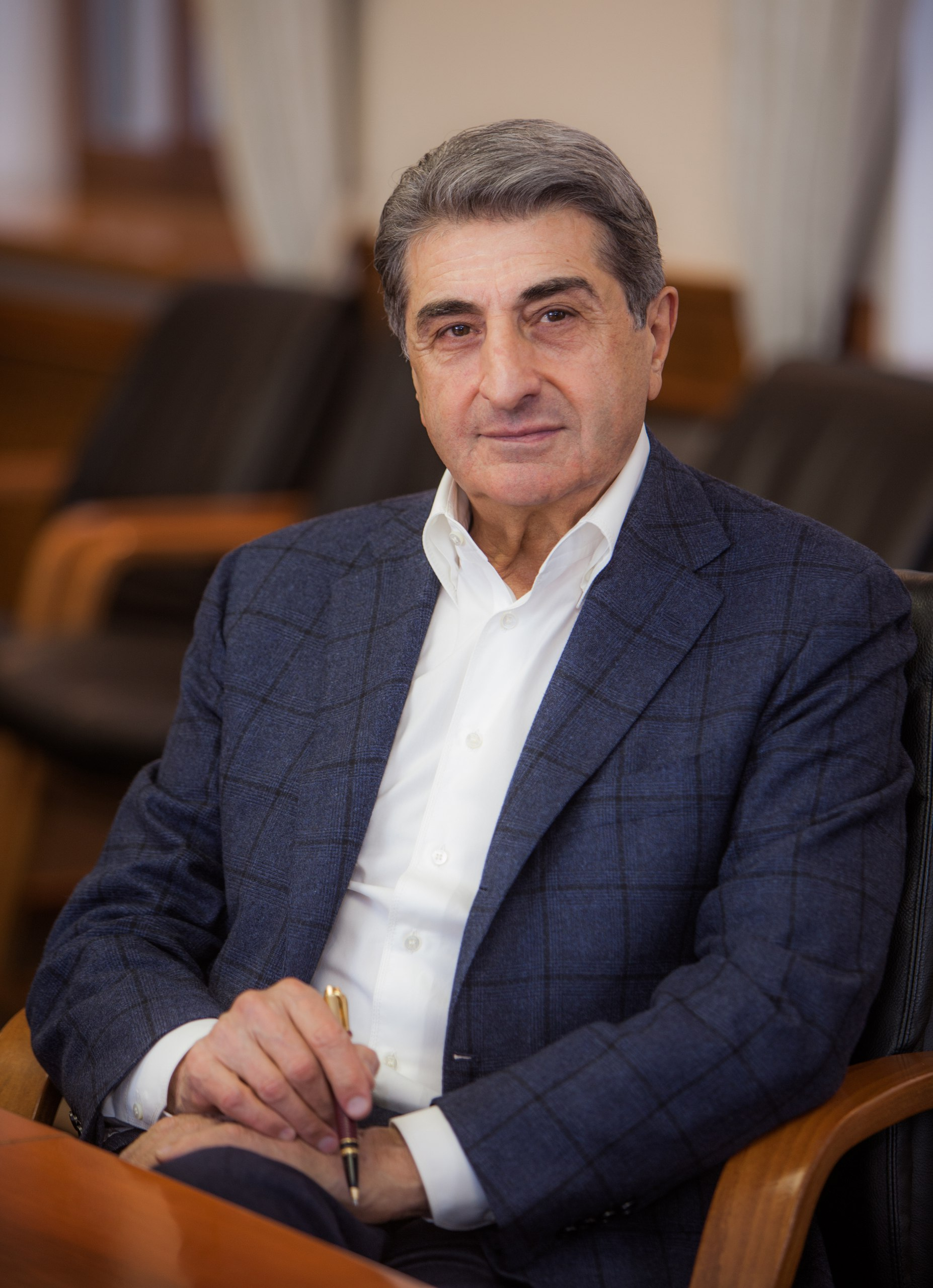
- Vasadze in 2021

People's Deputy of Ukraine
- In office 31 March 2002 – 27 November 2014
- Constituency: For United Ukraine!, No. 28 (2002–2006); Yulia Tymoshenko Bloc, No. 41 (2006–2012); Party of Regions, No. 36 (2012–2014)

Personal details
- Born: 15 October 1947 (age 78) Supsa, Georgian SSR, Soviet Union (now Georgia)
- Party: Strong Ukraine
- Other political affiliations: For United Ukraine!; Labour Ukraine; Party of Industrialists and Entrepreneurs of Ukraine; Batkivshchyna (2005–2010); Party of Regions (2010–2014)

Tariel Shakrovych Vasadze (Ukrainian: Таріел Шакрович Васадзе; born 15 October 1947 in Supsa, Lanchkhuti Municipality, Georgian SSR) is a Ukrainian businessman of Georgian descent, president of Ukrainian Automobile Corporation LLC, former Ukrainian Verkhovna Rada PM (IV, V, VI and VII convocations).

== Biography ==
Born on September 15, 1947 in the village of Supsa, Lanchkhuti Municipality, Georgian SSR, Vasadze graduated as a mechanical engineer at the Kyiv Automobile and Road Institute.

== Career ==
From 1971 to 1982, Vasadze worked as an engineer, senior foreman, workshop manager, director of a technical service station, and deputy general director of the Kyivavtotekhobslugovuvanniya association.

Subsequently, from 1982 to 1991, Vasadze was a deputy chief and chief of the "Avtotekhobslugovuvanniya" Ukrainian Republican administration.

During 1991–1992, Vasadze was the head of the "Avtoservis" republican association.

From 1992 to 2023, Vasadze was the honorary president and chairman of the board of the Ukrainian Automobile Corporation LLC.

== Politician ==
Former Ukrainian Verkhovna Rada PM (IV, V, VI and VII convocations), former Chairman of the subcommittee on tariff and non-tariff regulation of foreign trade (including anti-dumping investigations issues) of the Committee on Tax and Customs Policy of the Verkhovna Rada of Ukraine.

In 2006, Vasadze entered the Top 100 Most Influential Ukrainians, which is determined annually by the Korrespondent magazine where Vasadze took the 52nd position in 2006, and 32nd in 2008.

In 2007, Vasadze was recognized 92nd in the Top 200 Most Influential Ukrainians published by the Focus magazine.

From 2002 to 2006, he represented Ukraine in the Parliamentary Assembly of the Council of Europe (PACE).

In 2002, Vasadze was a freelance adviser to the Prime Minister of Ukraine Anatoly Kinakh.

From April 2002 to April 2006, Vasadze was a 4th Verkhovna Rada PM and part of the "For united Ukraine!" block.

From April 2006 to June 2007, Vasadze was a 5th Verkhovna Rada PM as a Yulia Tymoshenko Bloc’ member.

From November 2007, Vasadze was a 6th Verkhovna Rada Yulia Tymoshenko Bloc’ PM. He was Chairman of the subcommittee on tariff and non-tariff regulation of foreign trade (including anti-dumping investigations) of the Committee of the Verkhovna Rada of Ukraine on tax and customs policy and banking.

From 2012, Vasadze was a 7th Verkhovna Rada Party of Regions’ PM.

On February 21, 2014, after the events taking place on Maidan Nezalezhnosti in Kyiv, Vasadze has announced his withdrawal from the Party of Regions. After that, he joined the "Economic Development" faction, which included 35 deputies. The faction has then become part of a new coalition.

In 2014, he entered the list of candidates from Serhiy Tihipko's party "Strong Ukraine" in the extraordinary elections to the Verkhovna Rada.

Since 2014, Vasadze announced he no longer engages in political activities and is only focused on his business activities.

== Business ==
Within the past 30 years, Vasadze’s corporation took a leading position in the automotive market of Ukraine that emerged from scattered and lagging post-Soviet enterprises and maintained long-term partnerships with the leaders of the world automotive industry, such as Daimler AG, Kia Motors, General Motors, Toyota Chery. More than 90 enterprises provide jobs and make tax deductions to the country's budget. He managed to build vertically integrated business processes at UkrAVTO from full-scale car production and distribution to an extensive network of dealerships, logistics centers, forwarding services, leasing and car insurance.

=== During the war ===
Apart from the destruction of dealerships, the loss of assets and personnel in the occupied territories, the shutdown of the factory, the construction of several facilities was frozen in Kyiv, including the largest in Eastern Europe, the new Mercedes-Benz concept center operating according to the new MAR 2020 standards on the Stolychny Highway 90, which was supposed to be implemented in the fall of 2022.

Since the beginning of the full-scale invasion of the Russian Federation of Ukraine, there has been a challenge to eliminate the shortage of new cars and the risks of their operation due to the suspension of the supply of new cars to the Ukrainian market by manufacturers. Under the leadership of Vasadze, UkrAVTO managed to rebuild relations with suppliers and partners, as well as provide dealerships with means of alternative electricity supply to ensure uninterrupted operation of car service centers.

Due to the lack of volumes for production, the company began to gradually carry out work on the modernization and reconstruction of existing workplaces and the creation of new high-tech ones. For example, in September 2023, it was announced that the construction of the enterprise on the Stolychny highway would be resumed, which would set the highest standard of service to Ukrainians. It is expected that the construction of new facilities and the modernization of existing ones will create hundreds of jobs, which the country needs so much in times of war.

In the first days of the war, the insurance company Express Insurance, which belongs to the Vasadze Corporation, offered flexible payment terms for the CASCO in installments, and together with the dealerships, the restoration of cars after road accidents was ensured. As a result of this policy, according to the results of last year, the company entered the list of leaders in terms of insurance premiums.

== Private life ==
All his life he was married to Vasadze Shorena Serhiivna (died 16.06.2020), with whom he has two children — Vasadze Vakhtang Tarielovych and Vasadze Nina Tarielivna, who hold managerial positions in UkrAVTO. Has four grandchildren.

== Awards ==
- Honored Transport Worker of Ukraine (September 1997)
- Honorary Diploma of the Cabinet of Ministers of Ukraine (August 2002)
- Order of Merit 3rd Class (2002)
- Order of Merit 2nd Class (August 24, 2012) — for a significant personal contribution to the socio-economic, scientific, technical, cultural and educational development of the Ukrainian state, significant labor achievements, many years of conscientious work and on the occasion of the 21st anniversary of Ukraine's independence

== See also ==
- 29122 Vasadze is an asteroid named after this person.
