= LuAZ =

Ukrainian automotive company

Lutsk Automobile Plant LuAZ
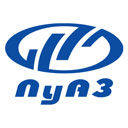

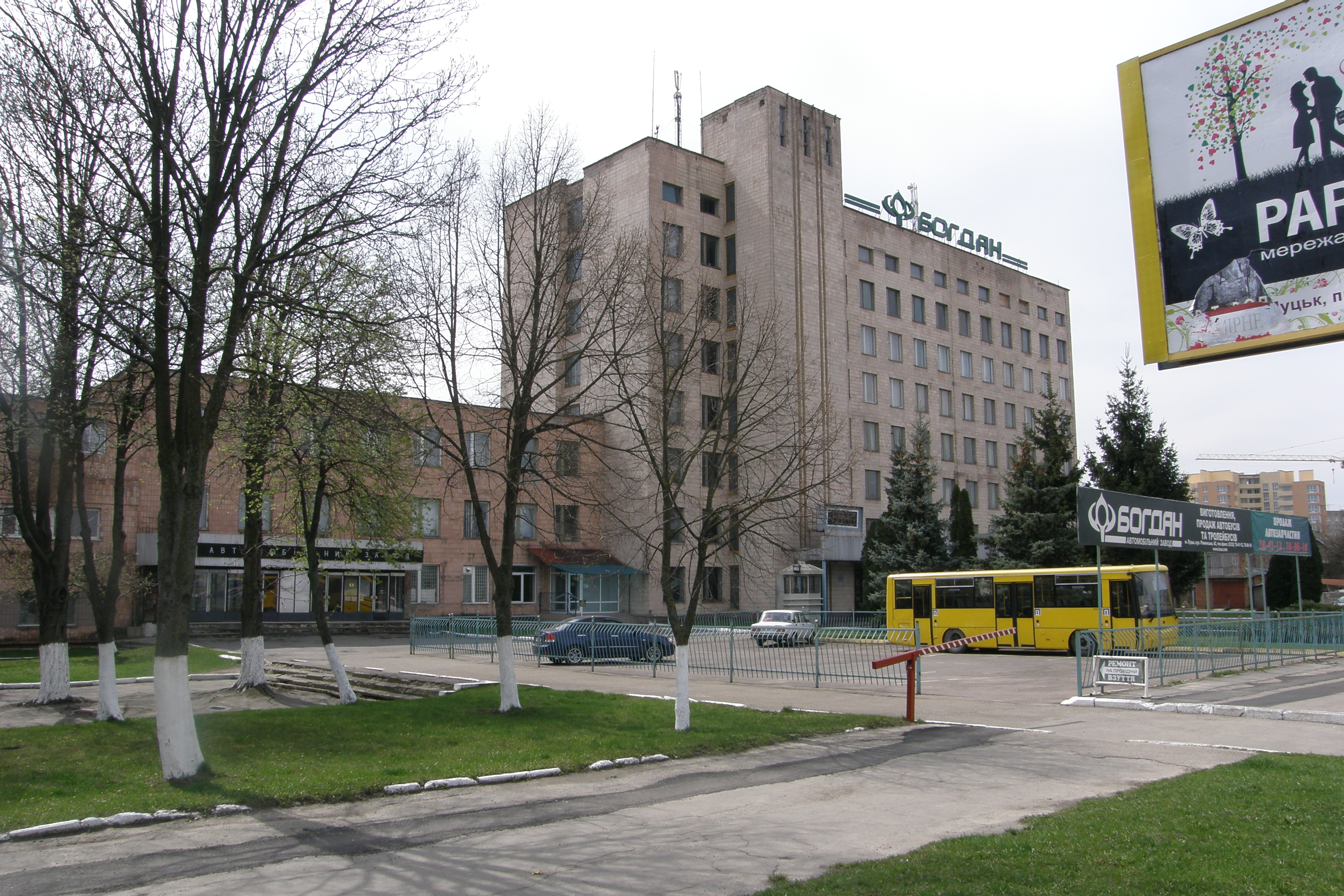
- Bogdan (former LuAZ) factory in Lutsk
- Native name: Луцький автомобільний завод
- Type: Privately held company
- Industry: Automobile manufacturing
- Founded: August 25, 1955
- Defunct: July 7, 2020
- Successors: Bogdan Motors ASZ No. 1 Luaz Motors
- Headquarters: Lutsk, Ukraine
- Area served: Ukraine
- Products: amphibious vehicles
- Parent: Bogdan Corporation

LuAZ (Ukrainian: ЛуАЗ), short for Lutsk Automobile Plant (Ukrainian: Луцький автомобільний завод, Lutskyi Avtomobilnyi Zavod) was a Ukrainian automobile manufacturer in the city of Lutsk built in the Soviet Union. Since 2009 it has been known as Bogdan Motors Automobile Assembly Plant No. 1 (Ukrainian: «Богдан Моторс» Автоскладальний завод №1, «Bohdan Motors» Avtoskladalnyi zavod №1).

== History ==
=== In Soviet Union ===
The construction of the factory began in 1951. It was opened in 1955 as LARZ (Lutskyi Avtoremontnyi Zavod, Lutsk Automobile Repair Plant). The early products of this relatively small plant were the repair parts for GAZ trucks.

On September 3, 1959, the factory was renamed to LuMZ (Lutskyi Mashynobudivnyi Zavod, Lutsk Machine Building Plant). After the reconstruction the plants begins to produce mobile repair shop and refrigerated truck bodies on Moskvitch, ZIL, and UAZ frames.

The first civilian products suffered a reputation for poor quality, however, "for a time the LuAZ was the only car that could be bought off the shelf by Soviet motorists".

In 1965, LuMZ starts the assembly of ZAZ-969 originally developed at Zaporizhzhia Automobile Building Plant. The first vehicle with an original design to be produced was the LuAZ-967 amphibious vehicle for the Red Army. It originated after the Korean War, when the Soviets saw a need for small off-road vehicles comparable to the American Willys MB, to supplement the overly-large and -heavy GAZ-69s then in service. Developed at NAMI (the National Automobile Institute), the prototype, known as NAMI 049, was completed in 1958. On December 11, the plant was renamed to LuAZ (Lutskyi Avtomobilnyi Zavod, Lutsk Automobile Plant)

In 1975, LuAZ joined the newly formed AvtoZAZ group. In 1979, the assembly of the new generation of ZAZ-969 begins. It received the name of LuAZ-969M and was widely known as 'Volynianka' (Volhynian). The car received good reviews at the international motor shows. In 1982, LuAZ assembled their 100,000th car, and the next year the export production begins.

In 1989, the factory assembled the LuAZ-1301 compact SUV prototype. In 1990, the plant reached its production record, assembling 16,500 cars in one year.

=== In independent Ukraine ===
On 31 May 1993, the Cabinet of Ministers of Ukraine allowed to privatize LuAZ, and the document was approved in June 1996. On 27 July 1998 the factory was excluded from the list of strategically important companies and controlling stake of LuAZ is being put up on sale. In 1999 81% stake of the company was purchased by the Ukrprominvest Group of Oleksii and Petro Poroshenko.

After being acquired, the plant began the complete knock-down of Russian UAZ and VAZ vehicles. In 2002, LuAZ stops the production of its older models to replace them with LuAZ-1301 which development began back in late 1980's, the new compact SUV concept gets launched at SIA-2002 motor show in Kyiv.

In 2005, Ukrprominvest formed the Bogdan Corporation. LuAZ entered it alongside Cherkasy Autobus Plant which was owned by the group since late 1990's. The company started assembly of Hyundai and Kia cars from CKD kits. In 2006 Ukraine adopted the Euro-2 regulations, putting an end to the LuAZ-1301 project.

In 2006, a new assembly line was opened at the plant to produce public transport vehicles. LuAZ stops being a separate brand and becomes a part of Bogdan Motors. In 2008, the reconstruction of the plant starts, and the next year it gets renamed to Avtoskladalnyi Zavod #1 (Automobile Assembly Plant No. 1) with plans of expanding the production, however the reconstruction was soon put on hold due to the 2008–2009 Ukrainian financial crisis.

In 2014 the equipment for production of former LuAZ cars was dismantled, and the company instead focused on assembling buses and trolleybuses.

On July 7, 2020, Bogdan Motors went bankrupt for inability to pay the credit to Ukreximbank. The Lutsk plant had stopped operation and was put up for sale.

== Vehicles ==
- LuAZ 967 a four-wheeled amphibian (1961–1989)
- LuAZ 969V "Volyn" (1967–72)
- LuAZ 969 "Volyn" (1971–1975)
  - LuAZ 969A "Volyn" (1975–1979)
  - LuAZ 969M "Volyn" with Zaporozhets 40 hp engine (1979–1996)
- LuAZ 970 6x4 amphibian prototype (mid 1980s)
- LuAZ 1301 few prototypes build (1984, 1990, 2002)
  - LuAZ 13019 a six-wheeled pick-up version of 1301 prototype (1990)
- LuAZ 1302 "Volyn" a modernized version of the 969M with Tavria 53 hp engine (1992–2002)
  - LuAZ 13021 "Volyn" a pick-up version of 1302 (1991–1998)
- LuAZ 1901 "Geolog" a 6x6 amphibian prototype (1999)
- LuAZ 2403 airport tractor (1979–1992)
- LuAZ Proto prototype (1988)

== Luaz Motors ==
The brand was revived as Luaz Motors by a Ukrainian entrepreneur Vadym Ihnatov.

According to Ihnatov's interview he got an idea of starting a company in 2017 when while visiting Canton Fair in China he spoke with the representatives of CSG Design and realized that Ukrainian market lacks a compact low-cost easily reparable vehicles. After that he partnered with Kaiyun Motors to work on the new model. First prototypes had too tight cabin so the electronics had to be significantly simplified. When the first units were ready for testing the company faced shipping difficulties and when they were finally sent to Ukraine Russia began their full-scale invasion causing units to be stuck in the port of Novorossiysk since 24 February 2022, eventually they were unloaded in Turkey later that year.

Vadym Ihnatov stated that he wanted to revive LuAZ because it was the first car he ever drove as a kid. Since the brand's name was out of use since 2000's Bogdan had lost their rights on LuAZ back in 2010 and Ihnatov was able to claim it on December 6, 2022. 15 December at 15:00 the new models were revealed, named City and Farmer as a 4-door pickup and 2-door pickup respectively, both with a loading bed. These vehicles were said to be powered with 5 kW engine with a top speed of 50 km/h and priced close to $5,000. The vehicles had batteries made by EmGo Technology in Odesa and chargind devices made by Eleek in Ternopil. Luaz Motors licensed the Yunlong EEC L7e platform from China since Ukraine had no plants that are able to produce a custom car body

15 May 2023 Luaz Motors took part in eCarExpo in Tallinn, Estonia. The car itself wasn't present because despite the help of the Embassy of Ukraine the company failed to get an approval of sending it to the country.

Luaz Farmer, Luaz City and Luaz Cargo officially launched on 30 May 2023 at ComAutoTrans in Kyiv. 1 June 2023 Luaz Farmer became available for sale. The first Luaz has been delivered to its corporate owner on 15 December 2023, the brand's first anniversary.

2 March 2024 at Congress of Veterans and Business Associations Vadym Ihnatov presented the Luaz Care designed for people with disabilities. 25 March the model won at EBRD Climate Innovation Vouchers Awards.

22 June 2024 at Elektroperspektyva in Kyiv Luaz launched Luaz Farmer 4x4.

In November 2024 Luaz Motors presented their projects in Corpus Christi, Texas.

16 December 2024 Luaz Motors shown the renders of a new model that isn't based on any Chinese chassis and has four motors and a steerable rear axle.

In March 2025 the 4x4 crew cab Luaz Adventure was revealed.

=== Vehicles ===
- Luaz Farmer (2023)
  - Luaz Cargo (2023)
  - Luaz Farmer 4x4 (2024)
- Luaz City (2023)
  - Luaz Care (2024)
  - Luaz Adventure (2025)

== Gallery ==
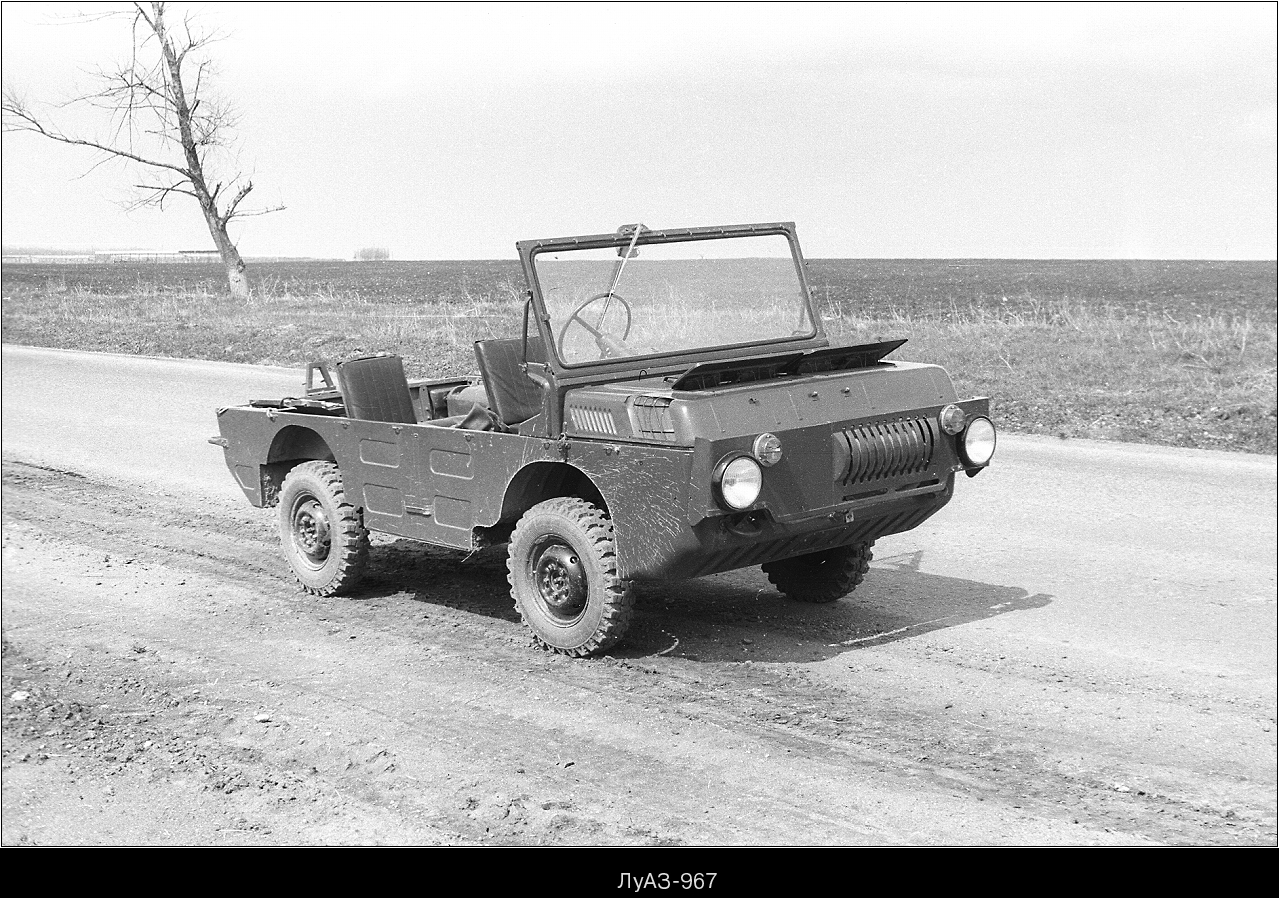
LuAZ 967M

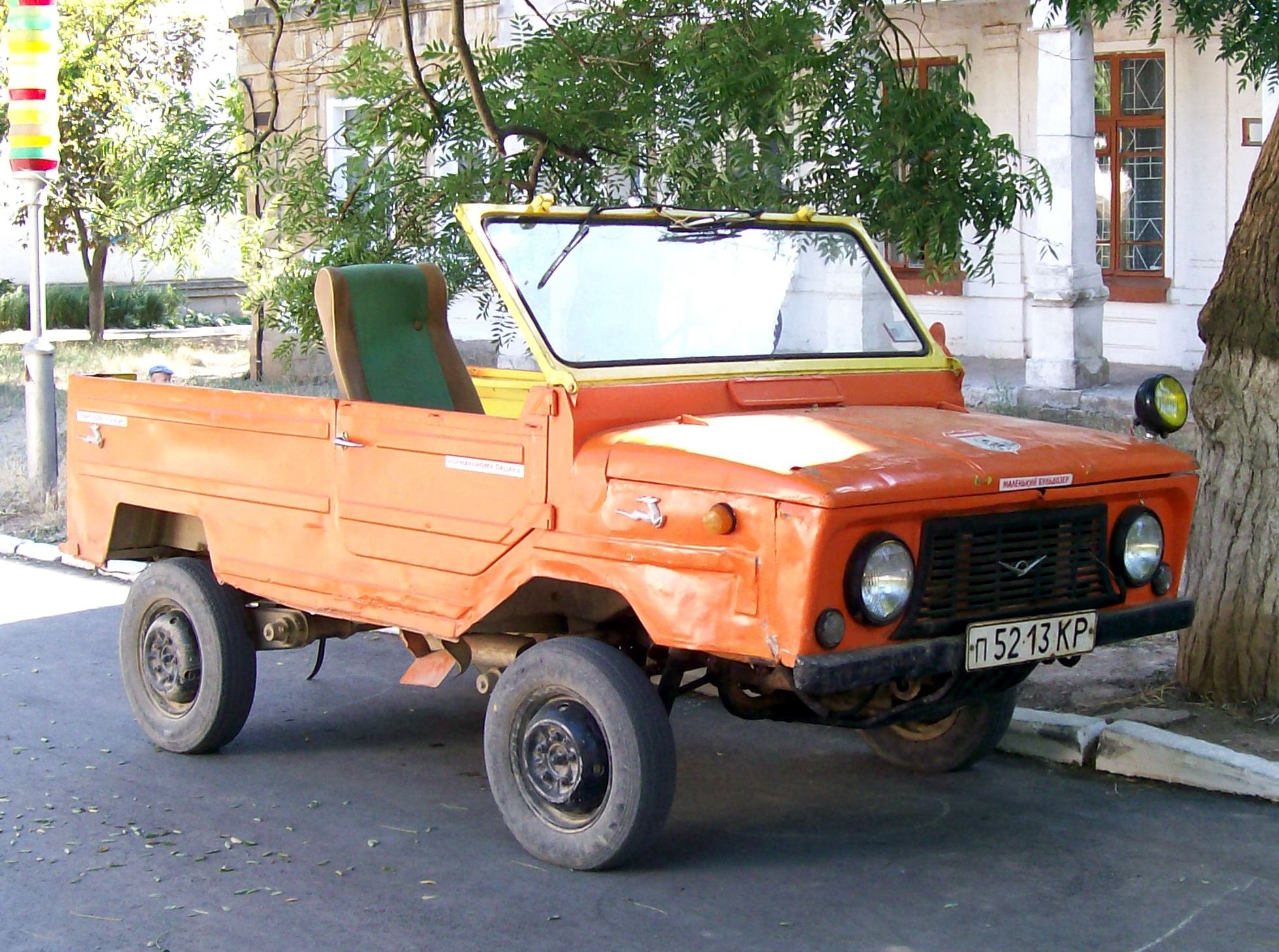
LuAZ 969

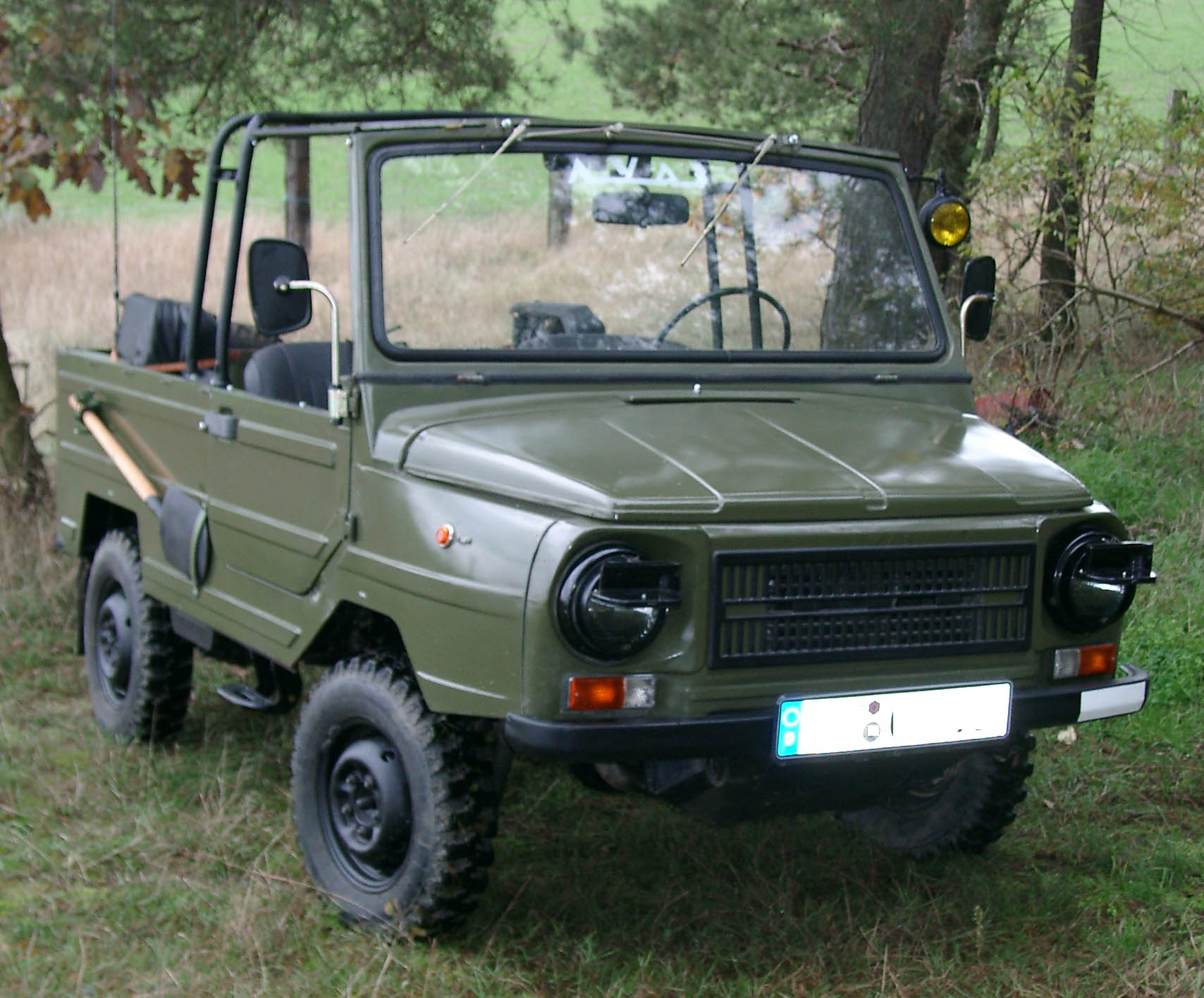
LuAZ 969M

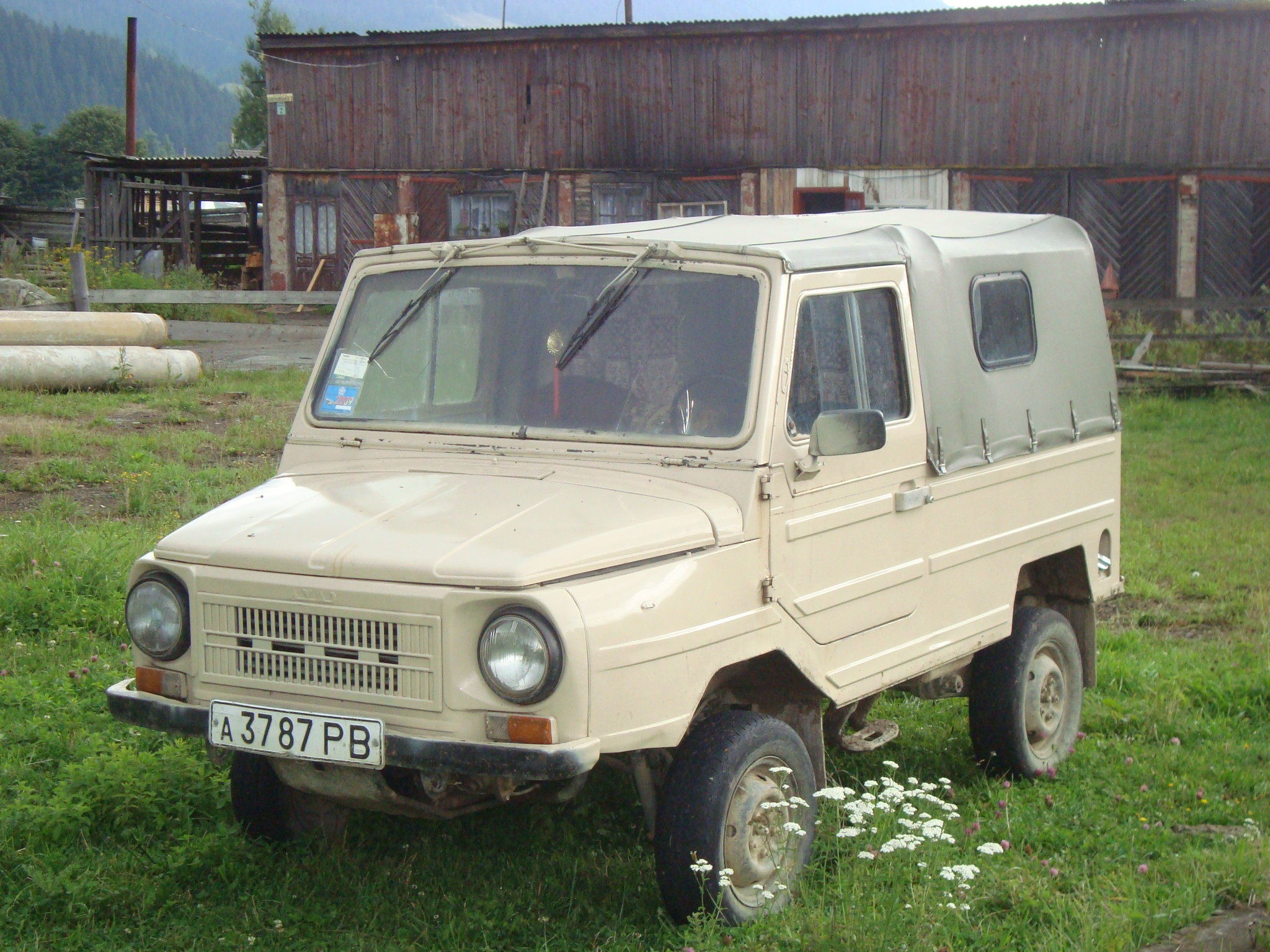
LuAZ 1302

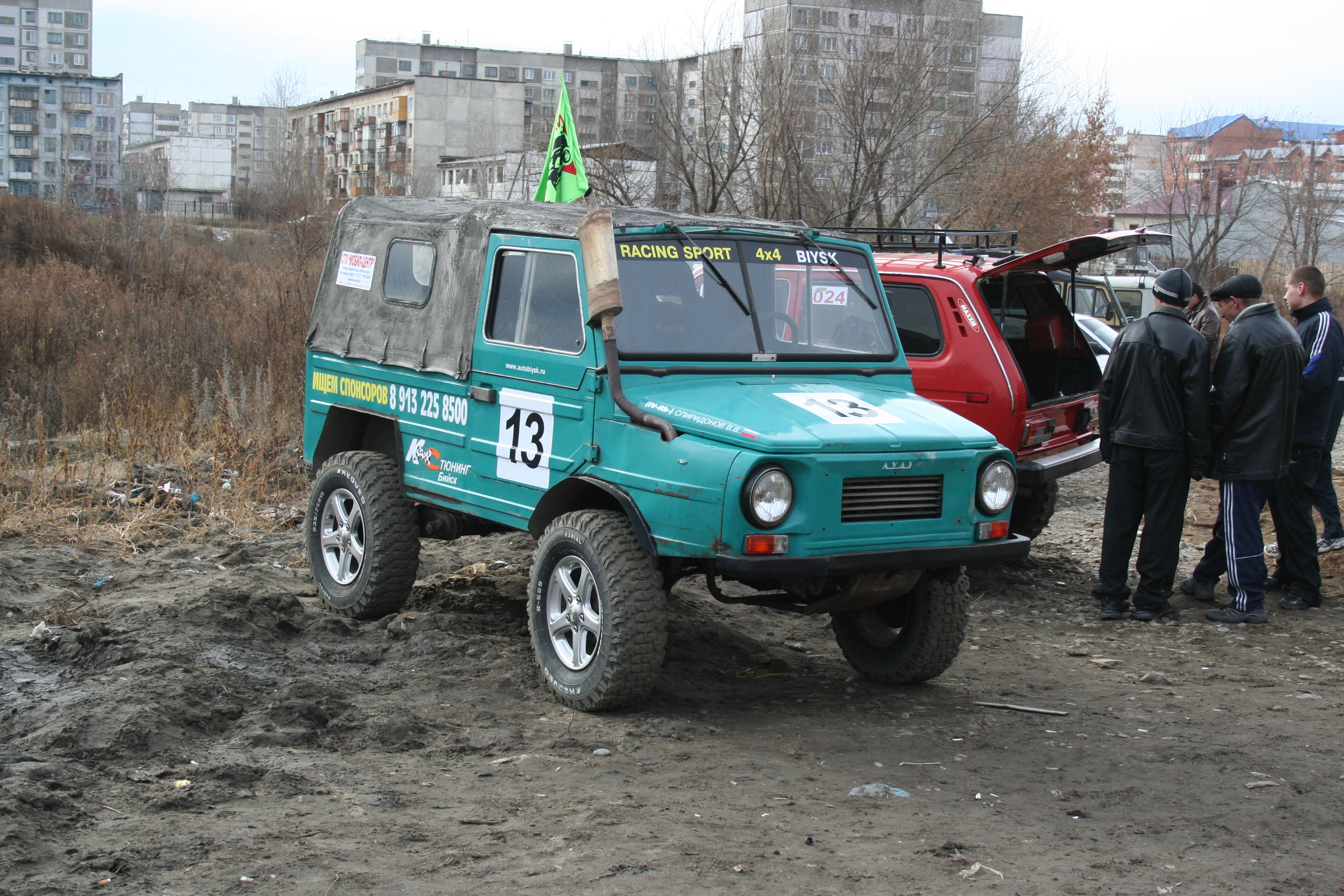
LuAZ 1302

== See also ==
- Automobile model numbering system in USSR and Russia
