= AvtoZAZ =

Ukrainian automotive manufacturing company

AvtoZAZ (Ukrainian: АвтоЗАЗ) is an automotive manufacturing company in Ukraine. It was founded in 1975 as Industrial Association, а holding that incorporated ZAZ, MeMZ, Illichivsk Automobile Parts Plant (Ukrainian: Іллічівський завод автоагрегатів) and a number of other automobile-production facilities in Lutsk (LuAZ) and Kherson. It is the only enterprise in Ukraine having full-scale cycle of passenger cars production.

== History ==
In the 1990s, it was reorganized into a joint-stock company, although 100% of shares stayed with the government.

In 1998 AvtoZAZ formed a joint venture with Daewoo Motors, named AvtoZAZ-Daewoo (АвтоЗАЗ-ДЕУ). ZAZ was included in the deal as 50% share on the behalf of AvtoZAZ. Following the bankruptcy of Daewoo Motors in 2001, Daewoo was bought out by General Motors, however GM refused to acquire overseas manufacturing subsidiaries including AutoZAZ-Daewoo; the Daewoo part was later bought out by a Swiss investment company in 2003.

Since the 2000s (decade), the state-owned 82% of AvtoZAZ shares were trusted to Ukrainian Automobile Corporation (UkrAVTO). In 2002, the corporation bought these shares and merged AvtoZAZ with ZAZ.
