= MeMZ-965 =

Motor vehicle engine

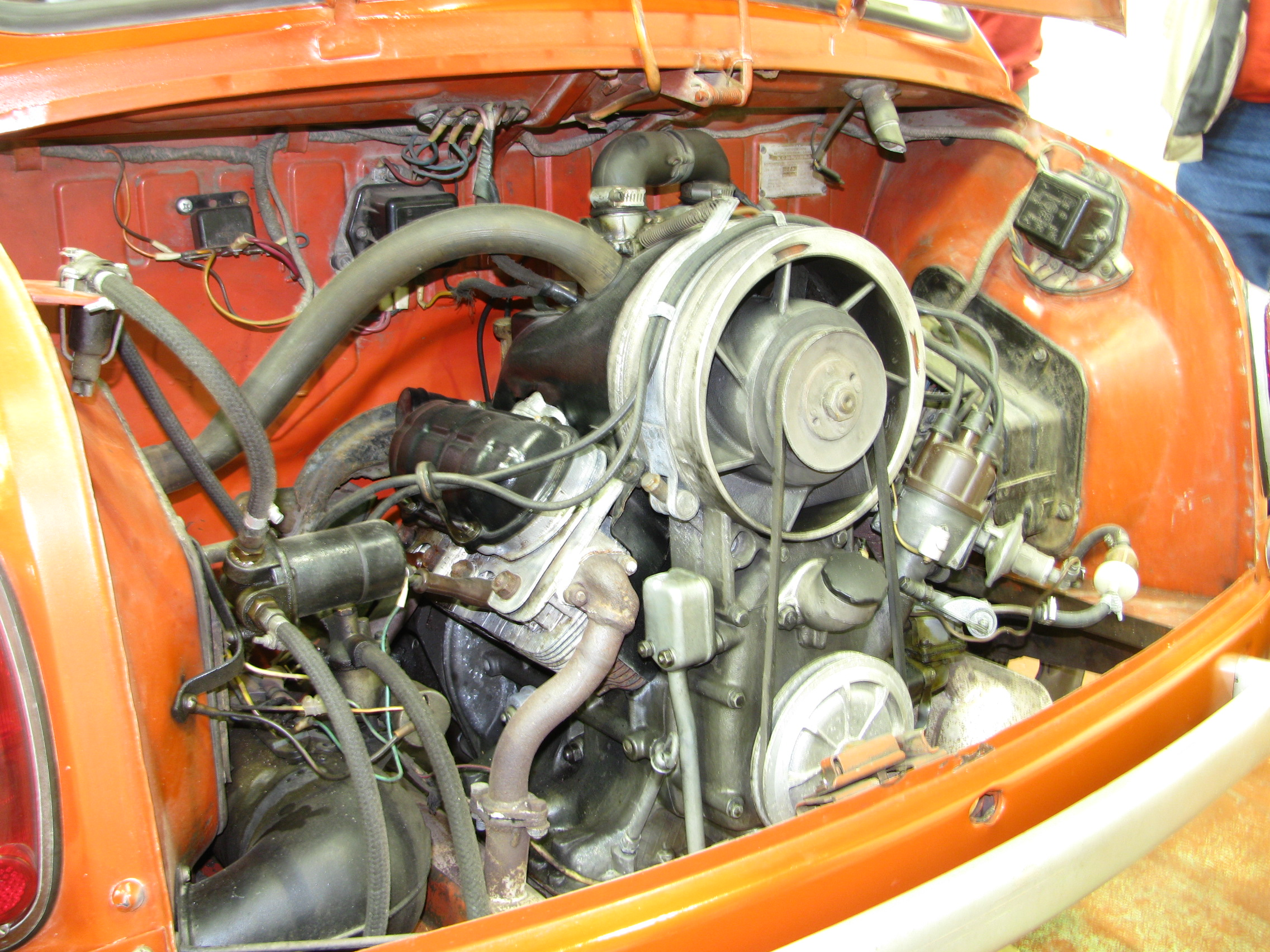
Engine of a ZAZ-965 Zaporozhets

The MeMZ-965 was a Soviet automobile engine, built by the Melitopolski Motor Plant (MeMZ).

Originally known as the NAMI-G (for the Soviet National Automotive Institute), the MeMZ-965 was designed for use in the LuAZ-967. It was a 746 cc (45.5 cu in) air-cooled 90° V4, producing 23 hp (17 kW; 23 PS). It had had characteristics not common for automobile engines, including a magnesium alloy engine block, accessories mounted high (to assist in case of crossing rivers), and a rear-mounted oil cooler.

When the initial MD-65 engine proposed for the ZAZ-965 proved inadequate, the MeMZ engine was selected, thanks in part to it being air-cooled, like the successful VW Type 1's boxer engine. It would be developed into the 887 cc (54.1 cu in) MeMZ-966 and the 1,197 cc (73.0 cu in) MeMZ-968.

The MeMZ-968 was offered in the ZAZ-968M in three performance levels:

- MeMZ-968E (40 hp (30 kW; 41 PS), carbureted, low-compression for 76-octane fuel);
- MeMZ-968GE (40 hp (30 kW; 41 PS), dual carburettor); or
- MeMZ-968BE (50 hp (37 kW; 51 PS), 8.4:1 compression, for 93-octane).

In addition, the MeMZ-965 would serve as a prototype 15 PS (11 kW) 500 cc (31 cu in) vee-twin (half an MeMZ-965), for the prototype NAMI 086.

Applications:

- LuAZ-967
- ZAZ-969
- ZAZ-965
- ZAZ-965A
- ZAZ-966
- ZAZ-968
- ZAZ-968M

== Sources ==
- Thompson, Andy. Cars of the Soviet Union. Somerset, UK: Haynes Publishing, 2008.
- ZAZ-965/965A, Avtolegendy SSSR Nr.17, DeAgostini 2009. ISSN 2071-095X. (in Russian)
