= MeMZ =

Brand of Ukrainian-made vehicle engines

Melitopol Motor Plant - MeMZ
- Company type: Privately held company
- Industry: automobile manufacturing
- Founded: 1908
- Founder: I. Zaferman
- Headquarters: Melitopol, Ukraine
- Products: automobile engines
- Parent: ZAZ
- Website: http://www.memz.com.ua

MEMZ is a brand of vehicle engines related to Melitopol Engine Factory (Ukrainian: Мелітопольський моторний завод; literally "Melitopol Motor Plant" ), which is located in Melitopol, Zaporizhzhia Oblast and it is a part of AvtoZAZ motor vehicle manufacturer out of Zaporizhzhia.

The factory was founded in 1908 by a Ukrainian Mennonite entrepreneur Izrail Davidovich Zaferman, intending to build diesel engines. After the October Revolution, it was nationalized, and until 1925 operated as the Russian Second Soviet Factory. It was renamed into the artel Pobeda (Victory) in 1925 and was focused mainly on diesel engine for applications in agricultural and construction machinery, and for fishing boats. In 1931, the factory was included to the state owned combinat Soyuzdiesel, focusing on engines for fishing boats. In 1936, it was again renamed, to Mikoyan Diesel-Building Factory. It was evacuated prior to the German invasion, and rebuilt, restarting production in 1944. In 1958, the name was changed again, to Melitopol Motor Plant (MeMZ), when it was refitted for production of automobile engines.

== Post-war ==
The large industrial city of Melitopol was freed from Nazi occupation in 1944, at which time the National Committee of USSR ordered the factory to resume operations.

In 1958 the factory was renamed MeMZ and started developing micro car engines for ZAZ. In 1960, MeMZ released its first gasoline engine, the 746 cc (45.5 cu in) V4 MeMZ-965, which had been designed for the LuAZ-967. The original engine had a peak power output of 23 hp (17 kW; 23 PS), and was selected for use in the ZAZ-965. It had a magnesium block, oil cooler on the rear of the engine, and accessories mounted high on the engine. Despite being small, the engine produced a great deal of heat, all of which could not be effectively dissipated by an air-cooling system. In 1963 the initial design saw some improvements and the new MeMZ-966 model was released into mass production.

The factory was incorporated into AvtoZAZ holding in 1975.

== MeMZ-966 engine ==
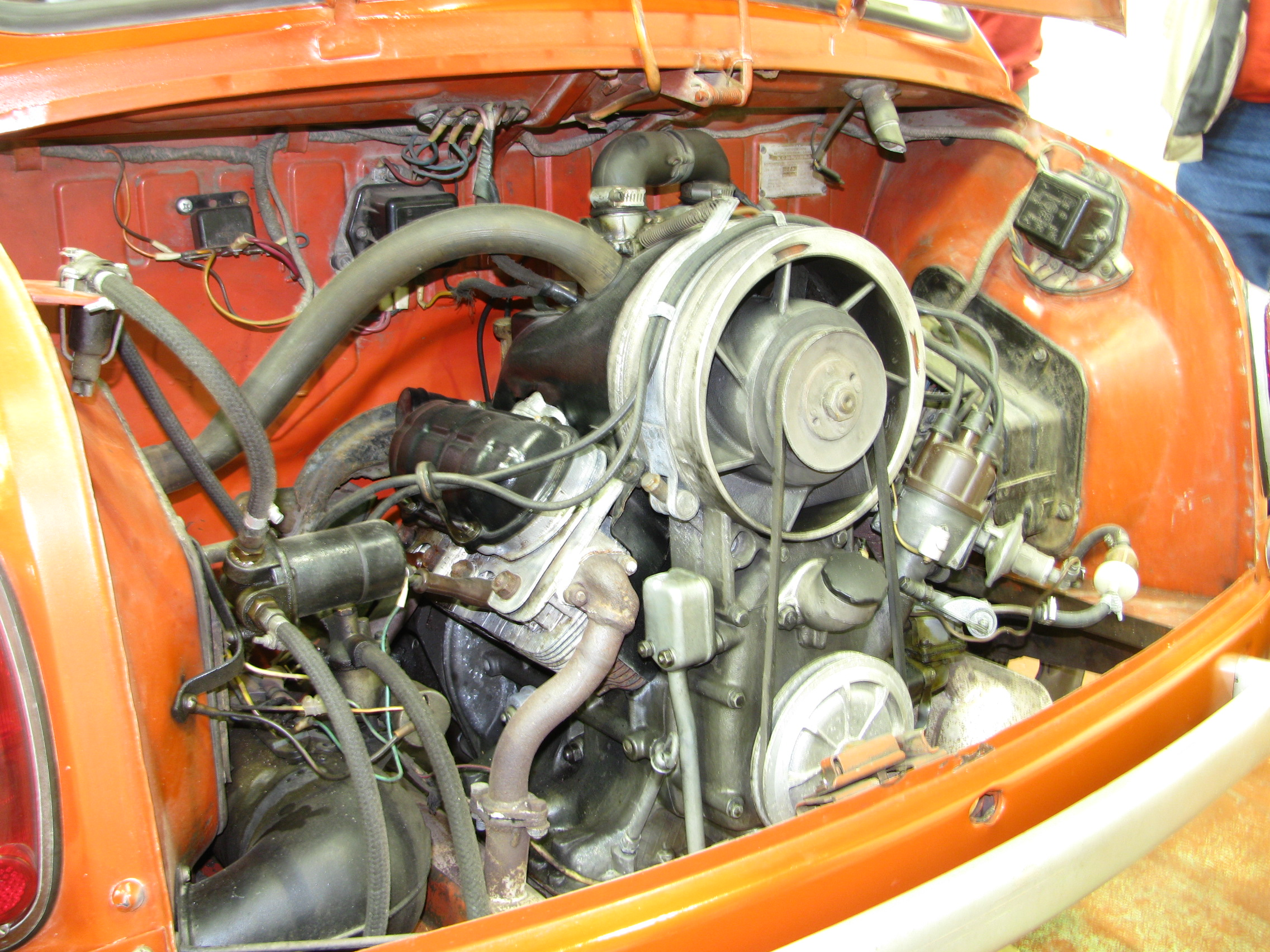
MeMZ-965AE engine of the Zaporozhets

The MeMZ-966 was an economy model; underpowered, but quite cheap to produce. As a result, it was implemented in what the Soviet government hoped would be the first "National" vehicle; the ZAZ (often referred to as Zaporozhets) - short for Zaporozhia Automotive Factory. The ZAZ model-line cars were intended to be affordable; therefore they were neither safe nor reliable; nevertheless they were a success since people would rather have some means of transportation as opposed to none at all. MeMZ continued to upgrade its engines, which eventually found uses in other vehicles.

The engine looks a bit like the VW air-cooled boxer four, except that the two cylinder banks are at a 90-degree angle. As Soviet car owners were expected to do much of the servicing themselves, and auto workshops were in short supply anyway, this layout was more practical.

== Merger ==
With the establishment of AutoZAZ-Daewoo in 1998, the factory was renamed AutoZAZ-Motor, and then incorporated into the ZAZ in 2002.

== Engine models ==
Model	MeMZ-965	MeMZ-965A/966	MeMZ-968	MeMZ-2471/2477	MeMZ-301/3011	MeMZ-307/3071
Type	OHV V4	OHV V4	OHV V4	I4	I4	I4
Volume	746 cc	887 cc	1.2 L	1.091/1.197 L	1.299 L	1.299 L
Power	23 hp (17 kW)	27 hp (20 kW)	42 hp (31 kW)	51–58 hp (38–43 kW)	63 hp (47 kW)	64–70 hp (48–52 kW)
Cooling	Air	Air	Air	Water	Water	Water
Used in	ZAZ-965 Zaporozhets	ZAZ-965A/966 Zaporozhets	ZAZ-968 Zaporozhets	ZAZ-1102 Tavria, ZAZ-1103 Slavuta, ZAZ-1105 Dana, Daewoo Sens

MeMZ-307/3071 are fuel injected versions of MeMZ-301/3011
