= LuAZ-967 =

LuAZ-967M
- Type: 4x4 amphibious cargo
- Place of origin: Soviet Union

Service history
- Used by: Soviet Union

Production history
- Designer: MeMZ
- Designed: 1959
- Manufacturer: LuAZ
- Produced: 1961–1975

Specifications
- Mass: 950 kg (2,090 lb)
- Length: 3,682 mm (145 in)
- Width: 1,712 mm (67 in)
- Height: 4,520 mm (178 in)
- Engine: MeMZ-967A; 887 cc (54 cu in) gasoline V4; 37 hp (28 kW)
- Drive: 4WD or 4X4
- Maximum speed: 75 km/h (47 mph) (road); 3 km/h (1.9 mph) (water)

The LuAZ-967 (Russian: ЛуАЗ-967) was the Transporter of the Front Line, a small Soviet four-wheel drive amphibious vehicle. Light enough to be air transportable, it had a 400 kg (880 lb) payload over most terrain.

== History ==
The design originated after the Korean War, when the Soviets saw a need for small off-road vehicles comparable to the American Jeep, to supplement the overly-large and -heavy GAZ-69s then in service. It was to be used by Soviet Airborne Forces (VDV) for casualty evacuation, munition supply and the transport of light armaments.

Developed at NAMI (the National Automobile Institute), the prototype, known as NAMI 049, was completed in 1958. Unlike the Jeep, it had a fibreglass body, four-wheel torsion bar independent suspension, and permanent four-wheel drive with locking hubs. It had a wheelbase of 1,800 mm (71 in), a ground clearance of 280 mm (11 in), and was powered by a 22 hp (16 kW; 22 PS) MD-65 motorcycle engine (copied from an Orbita motorcycle). Trials proved it underpowered, and the body too fragile.

A second prototype, the NAMI 049A, had a 746 cc (45.5 cu in) V4 MeMZ-965 engine (selected for use in the ZAZ-965), steel body, and rear wheel drive (with optional drive to the front wheels). The torsion bars were replaced with a coil spring setup. It weighed 1,350 kg (2,980 lb), with a 37 hp (28 kW; 38 PS) MeMZ-967A engine, and was able to pull a 300 kg (660 lb) trailer; it could cross a 58° gradient, and top speed was 80 km/h (50 mph).

It was produced between 1961–1975 at Lutsk automobile plant - LuAZ. It was succeeded by the ZAZ-969, LuAZ-969, LuAZ-969М and the LuAZ-1302.

Interior

== Modifications ==
- LuAZ-967A — modernized high-powered engine MeMZ-967А
- LuAZ-967M — modernized ЛуАЗ-967А with the same engine.
- Geolog - a specialized 6-wheel version.

== Mechanical ==
The LuAZ-967M had a MeMZ-967A 887 cc (54 cu in) gasoline engine from the ZAZ automobile. An air-cooled, carbureted ohv V4, it developed 37 hp (28 kW) at 2,250 rpm.

A 4+1 speed transmission has separately engaged crawl gear. Unlike many small military vehicles, it was a front wheel drive 4×2, the rear axle was selectively engaged only when 4×4 was needed.

The watertight steel body had 4-wheel independent suspension with torsion bars and 285 mm (11 in) of ground clearance. The driving controls were on the truck's centerline, both the controls and the windshield could be folded down for a lower profile.

== Sources ==
- Многоцелевой транспортер // журнал «За рулём», № 4, апрель 1978. стр.2
- Thompson, Andy (2008). Cars of the Soviet Union. Haynes Publishing. ISBN 978-1844254835.
- Ware, Pat (2010). The World Encyclopedia of Military Vehicles. Lorenz Books. p. 179. ISBN 978-0-7548-2052-9.
