= ZAZ Zaporozhets =

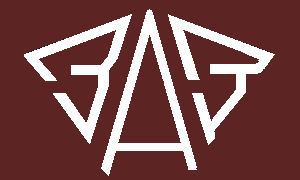
Logo

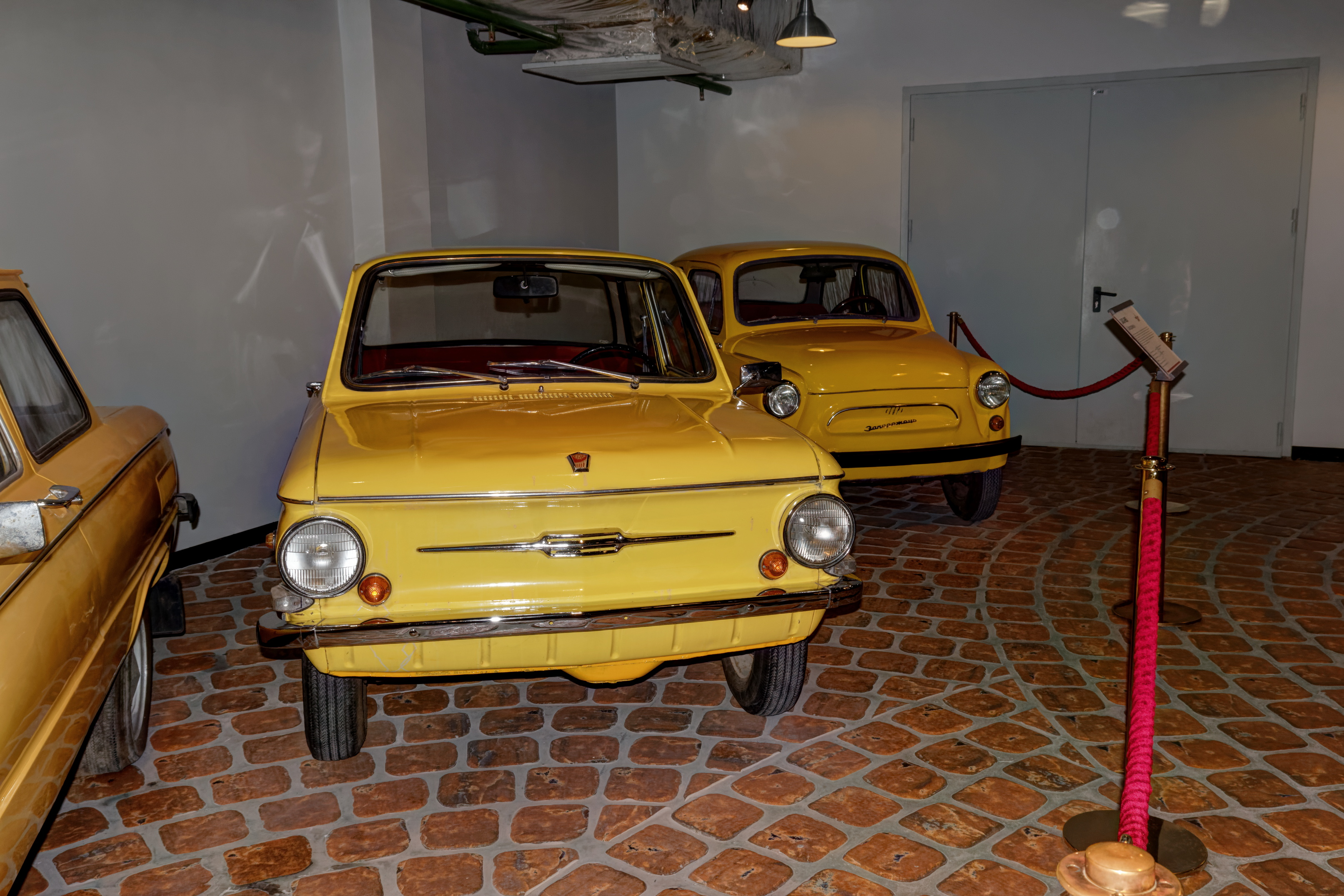
ZAZ-968 and ZAZ-965 cars

ZAZ Zaporozhets (Ukrainian: Запорожець) was a series of rear-wheel-drive superminis (city cars in their first generation) designed and built from 1958 at the ZAZ factory in Soviet Ukraine. Different models of the Zaporozhets, all of which had an air-cooled engine in the rear, were produced until 1994. Since the late 1980s, the final series, ZAZ-968M, was replaced by the cardinally different ZAZ-1102 Tavria hatchback, which featured a front-wheel drive and a more powerful water-cooled engine.

The name Zaporozhets translates into a Cossack of the Zaporizhian Sich or а man from Zaporozhye (now Zaporizhzhia) or the Zaporozhye Oblast (now Zaporizhzhia Oblast).

Zaporozhets is still well known in many former Soviet states. Like the Volkswagen Beetle or East Germany's Trabant, the Zaporozhets was destined to become a "people's car" of the Soviet Union, and as such it was the most affordable vehicle of its era. At the same time, it was rather sturdy and known for its excellent performance on poor roads. Another important advantage of the Zaporozhets was its ease of repair.

The car's appearance gave birth to several nicknames that became well known across the Soviet Union: horbatyi ("hunchback", owing to ZAZ-965's insect-like form; although ZAZ factory workers never used this nickname), malysh (English: Kiddy), maanteemuhk (Estonian: Roadbump), ushastyi ("big-eared", due to ZAZ-966 and ZAZ-968's round air intakes on each side of the car to cool the rear-mounted engine), zapor ("constipation"), mylnitsa ("soap-box", for ZAZ-968M, lacking "ears" and producing a more box-like appearance).

Numerous special versions of the Zaporozhets were produced, equipped with additional sets of controls that allowed operating the car with a limited set of limbs, and were given for free or with considerable discounts to disabled people, especially war veterans - similar to SMZ-series microcars. These mobility cars would at times take up to 25% of ZAZ factory output.

== First generation (1960–1969) ==
ZAZ-965 (1960–1963); ZAZ-965A (1962–1969)
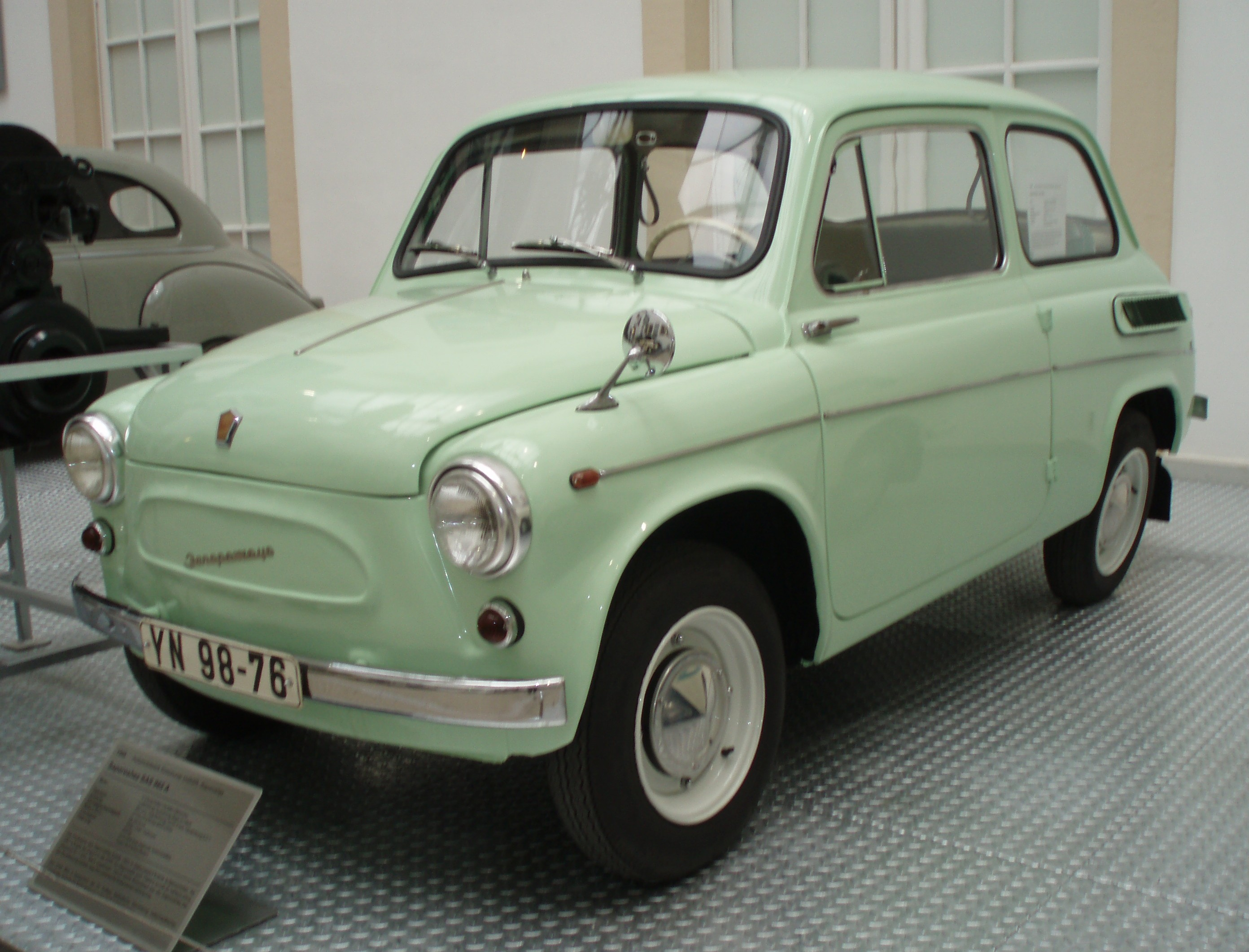
- ZAZ-965A

Overview
- Manufacturer: Zaporizhzhia Automobile Factory (ZAZ)
- Also called: Zaporozhets
- Production: October 1960 – May 1969
- Assembly: Soviet Union: Zaporizhia

Body and chassis
- Class: City car (A-segment)
- Body style: 2-door saloon
- Layout: RR layout

Powertrain
- Engine: 746 cc MeMZ-965 V4; 887 cc MeMZ-966 V4
- Transmission: 4-speed manual

Dimensions
- Wheelbase: 2,160 mm (85.0 in)
- Length: 3,330 mm (131.1 in)
- Width: 1,395 mm (54.9 in)
- Height: 1,450 mm (57.1 in)
- Kerb weight: 665 kg (1,466 lb)

Chronology
- Successor: ZAZ-966 Zaporozhets

=== ZAZ-965 ===
The ZAZ-965 was a city car produced from 1960 to 1963. The design of a simple economy city car, and one in part taking the place of the soon to be discontinued Moskvitch 401, began in 1956. Following the growing trend of city cars (then accounting for between 25% and 40% of all European car sales), the minister in charge of Minavtroprom (the Soviet automotive ministry) Nikolay Strokin selected the new Fiat 600 as the model to follow. However, despite being visually similar to the Fiat, the ZAZ was in fact a completely different car.

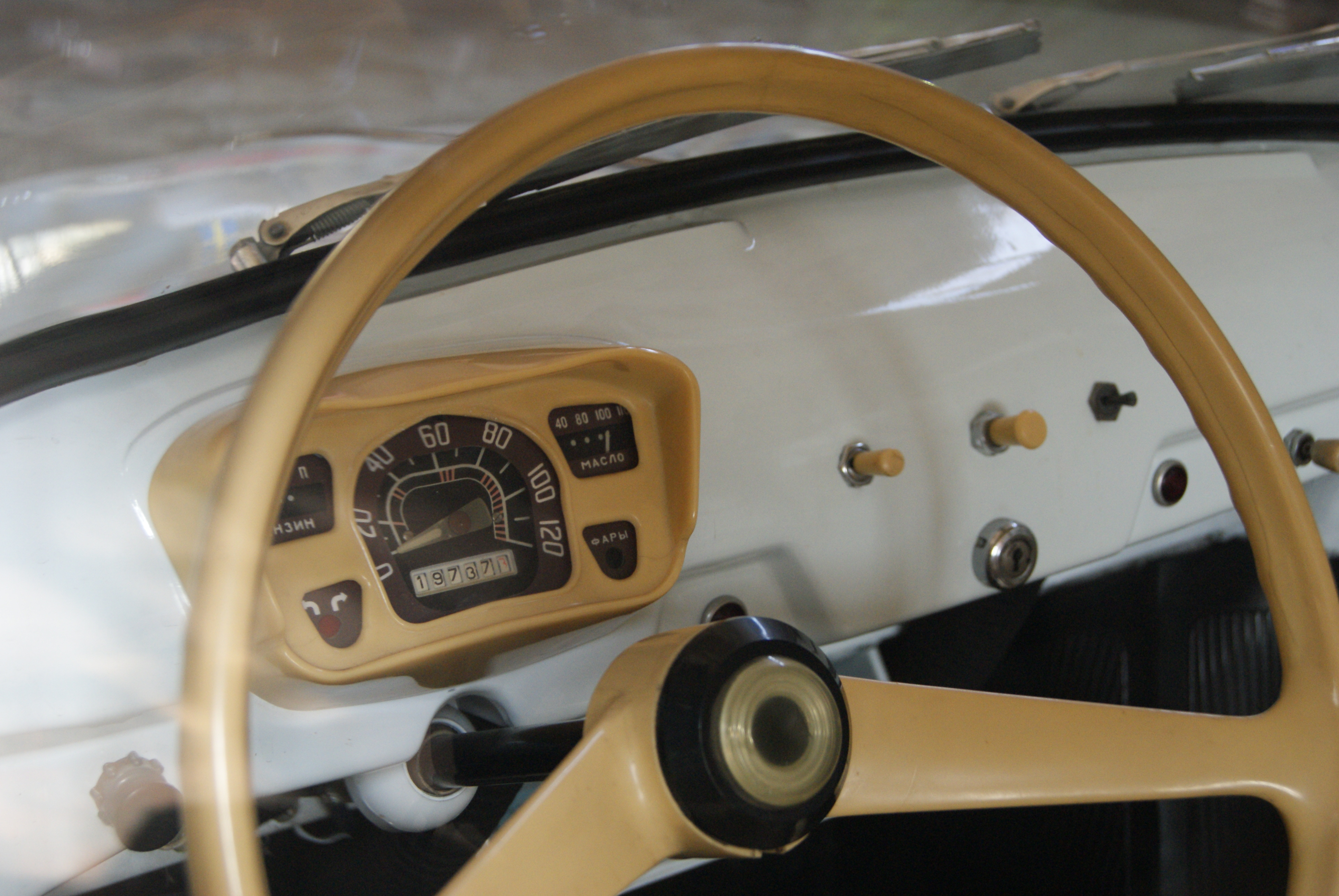
ZAZ-965 dashboard

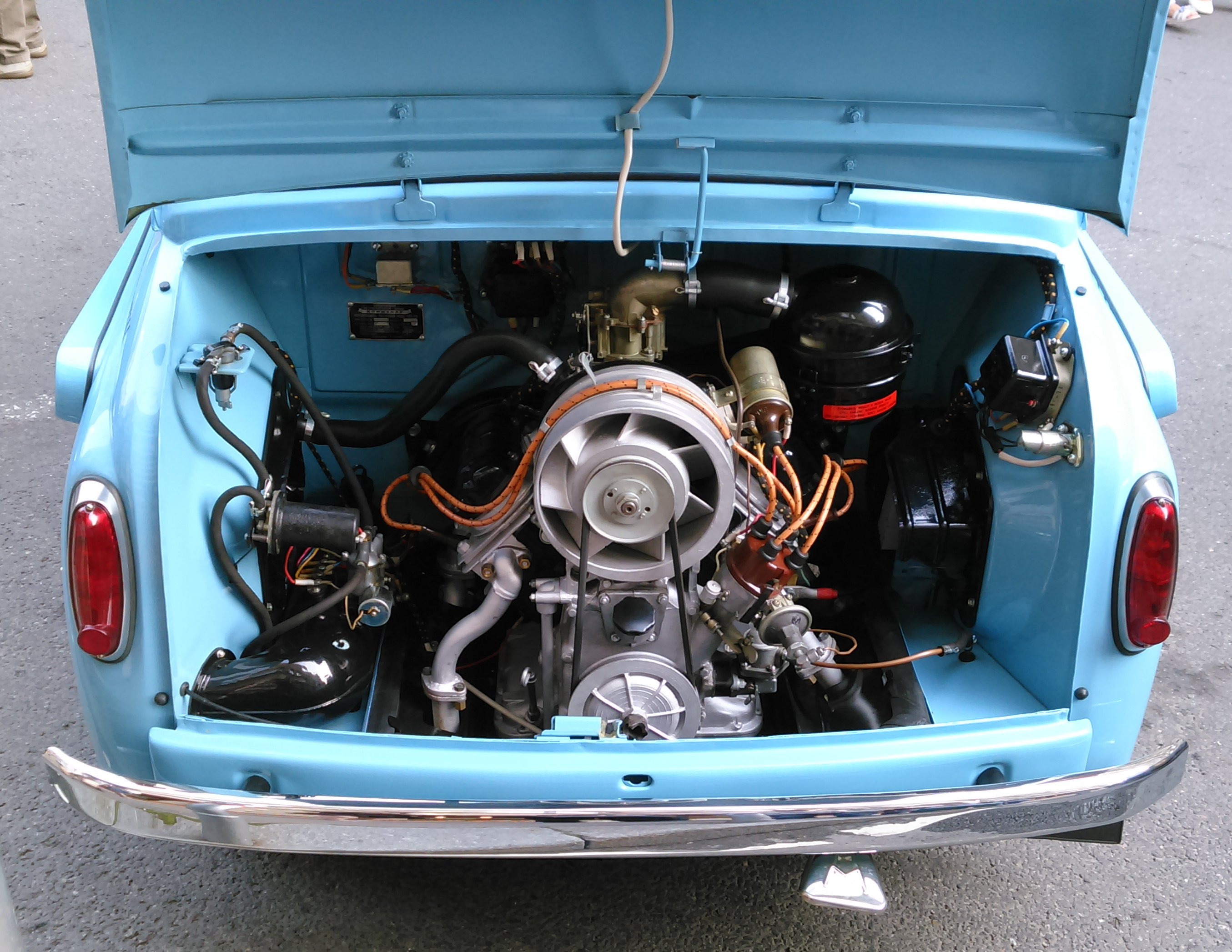
ZAZ-965 Zaporozhets engine

The first prototype, the Moskvitch-444, was designed by MZMA in October 1957; it used the same glass for front and rear windows. Its ground clearance, on 13 in (330 mm) wheels, was 200 mm (7.9 in). The prototype was first powered by a flat twin-cylinder MD-65 engine provided by the Irbitskiy Motorcycle Plant, which was "totally unsuited": it produced only 17.5 hp (13 kW) and lasted only 30,000 km (19,000 mi) between major overhauls. As a result, a search for another engine was begun, and the success of the VW Type 1's boxer led to a preference for an air-cooled engine, which NAMI (the National Automobile Institute) had on the drawing board. Minavtroprom, however, preferred a 23 hp (17 kW) rear-mounted 746 cc (45.5 cu in) V4, the NAMI-G, which had the additional advantage of being developed for the LuAZ-967. As a result, it had characteristics not common for automobile engines, including a magnesium alloy engine block. (This engine, the MeMZ-965, would be built by the Melitopolski Motor Plant, MeMZ.) The V4 was a rather unusual engine configuration for an automobile, with its only other notable use in a similar era being in Ford vehicles like the Taunus and Transit van. It had the drawback of needing to have the rear of the car redesigned to fit, as well as needing a new rear suspension. The influence of the LuAZ designers led to the introduction of independent suspension on all four wheels. Its front doors open in a manner like suicide doors, partly to make it more accessible to disabled people.

One of the primary differences was that the engine, which featured a V4 layout in place of the Fiat's inline-four, was air-cooled, like the flat-4 engine used by Volkswagen in vehicles like the Beetle and Type 2 microbus. The Zaporozhets also featured bigger wheels and front suspension on torsion bars. In 1958, the government ordered production of the car in the reformed ZAZ factory, under its final designation ZAZ-965. All further production of the car was carried out there.

The new car was approved for production at the MeMZ factory on the 28th of November, 1958, changing the name to ZAZ (Zaporizhzhia Automobile Building Plant) to reflect the new profile. The Zaporizhzhia factory was supplemented with the Mikoyan Diesel-Building Factory in Melitopol, which was part of the Soyuzdiesel combinat.

The first car, dubbed the ZAZ-965 Zaporozhets, was delivered 12 June 1959, was approved 25 July 1960, and entered production 25 October. The Zaporozhets was priced at 1,800 redenominated roubles.

There was also a car-derived van model for the Soviet post office, the ZAZ-965S, with right-hand drive and blanked-off windows.

=== ZAZ-965A ===
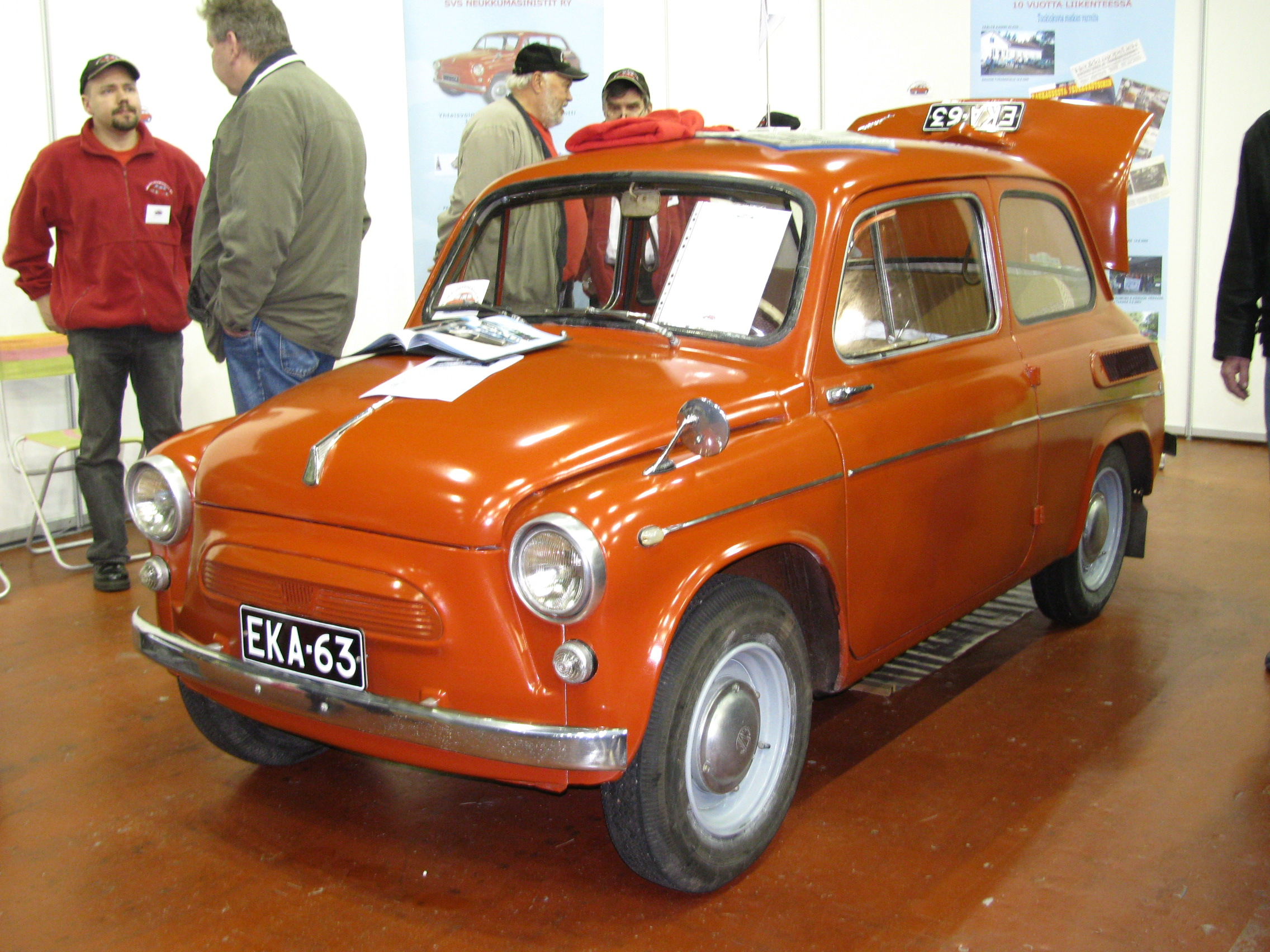
ZAZ-965AE

The ZAZ-965A was an improvement on the ZAZ-965 and was produced from November 1962 to May 1969. In total, 322,106 units of the ZAZ-965 were produced. It was powered by a MeMZ-965 rear-mounted, air-cooled OHV 887 cc (54.1 cu in) V4 engine, partially of aluminium design, producing 27 PS (20 kW). From November 1966 some cars were fitted with the slightly more powerful 30 PS (22 kW) MeMZ-965A engine. The ZAZ-965's modest engine output has given ground to an urban joke that it was used as a starter motor in Soviet tanks.

As Soviet drivers were expected to do much of the servicing themselves, and mechanics trained in the servicing of consumer automobiles were in short supply, the engine's 90° V4 layout proved more practical, especially in harsh winter conditions. The rearwards centre of gravity of the engine also provided superior traction on steep slopes, though this advantage, which was also continued in later models, came at the expense of the car's infamous lack of cornering stability.

The ZAZ-965A also had its versions for disabled people (ZAZ-965B, AB, AR), as well as a more luxurious export variant, the ZAZ-965AE Yalta.

Despite the low prestige of those cars, they have shown an unbeaten accessibility and popularity among the people of the Soviet Union, becoming the "car for pensioners and intellectuals". They were the cheapest Soviet-made cars. Quite a large number of them were produced in variants for disabled people, with modified steering.

Between November 1966 and May 1969 the ZAZ-965A and its successor, the ZAZ966, were produced concurrently.

When production of the ZAZ-965 ended, 322,116 had been built.

The ZAZ-965 also inspired the 1962 prototype NAMI 086, named Sputnik (Fellow Traveller), with a 15 PS (11 kW) 500 cc (31 cu in) vee-twin (half an MeMZ-965), electromagnetic clutch and four-speed transmission. Fitted with a four-wheel independent suspension and weighing just 520 kg (1,150 lb), and intended for use by disabled people, it was never built.

The ZAZ KD of 1969 was also based on the ZAZ-965, fitted with a glassfibre body, giving it a weight of only 500 kg and a top speed of 75 mph (121 km/h) using just 30 PS (22 kW). It was never produced in quantity, either.

== Second generation (1966–1994) ==
ZAZ-966 (1966–1972); ZAZ-968 (1971–1980); ZAZ-968M (1979–1994)
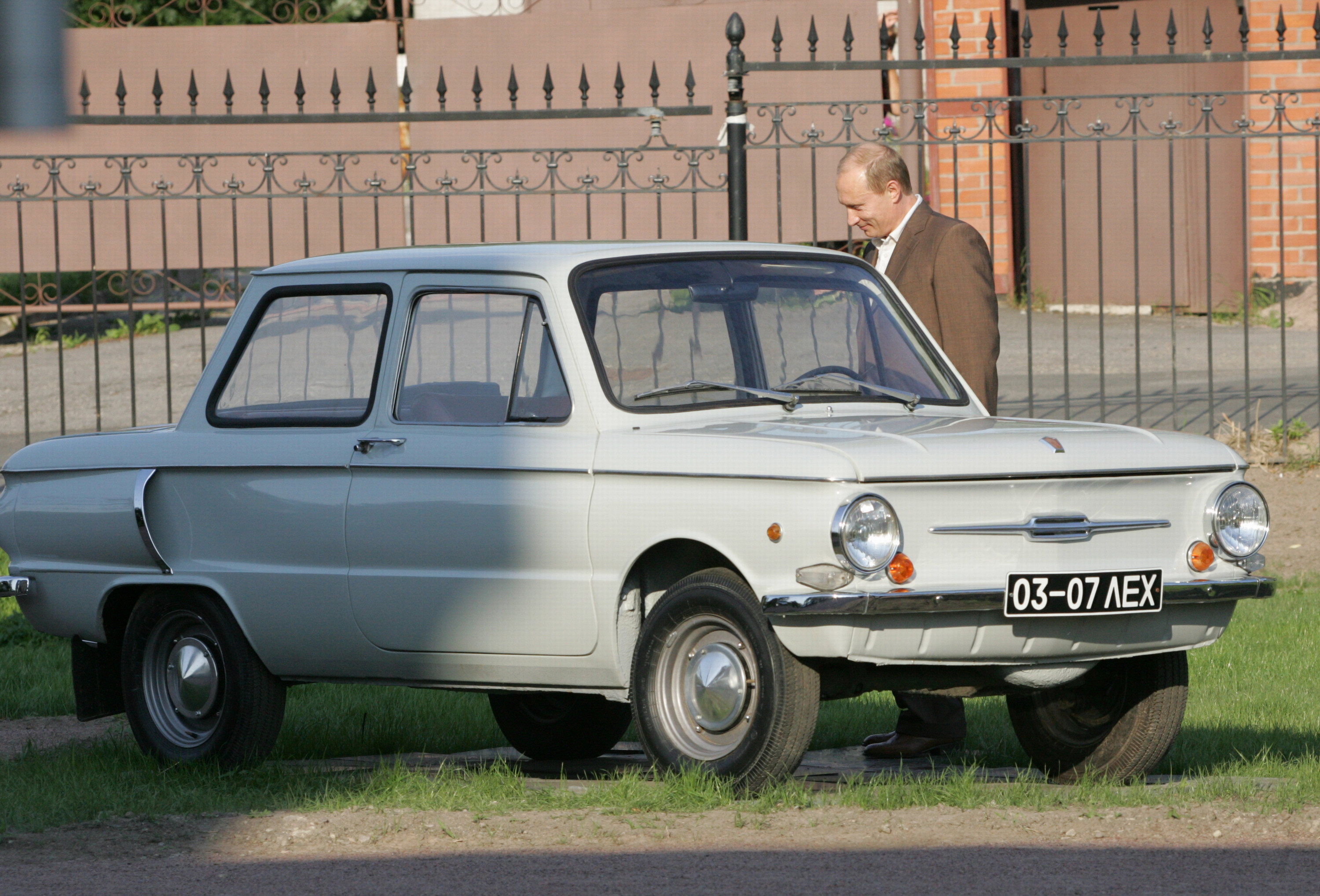
- Vladimir Putin with his 1972 ZAZ-968

Overview
- Manufacturer: Zaporizhzhia Automobile Factory (ZAZ)
- Also called: Zaporozhets
- Production: November 1966 – June 1994
- Assembly: Soviet Union / Ukraine: Zaporizhzhia

Body and chassis
- Class: Supermini (B)
- Body style: 2-door notchback saloon

Powertrain
- Engine: 1.2L MeMZ-968 V4
- Transmission: 4-speed manual

Dimensions
- Wheelbase: 2,160 mm (85.0 in)
- Length: 3,730 mm (146.9 in)
- Width: 1,540 mm (60.6 in)
- Height: 1,370 mm (53.9 in)
- Curb weight: 780 kg (1,720 lb); (dimensions for ZAZ-968)

Chronology
- Predecessor: ZAZ-965A (Zaporozhets)
- Successor: ZAZ-1102 Tavria

=== ZAZ-966 ===
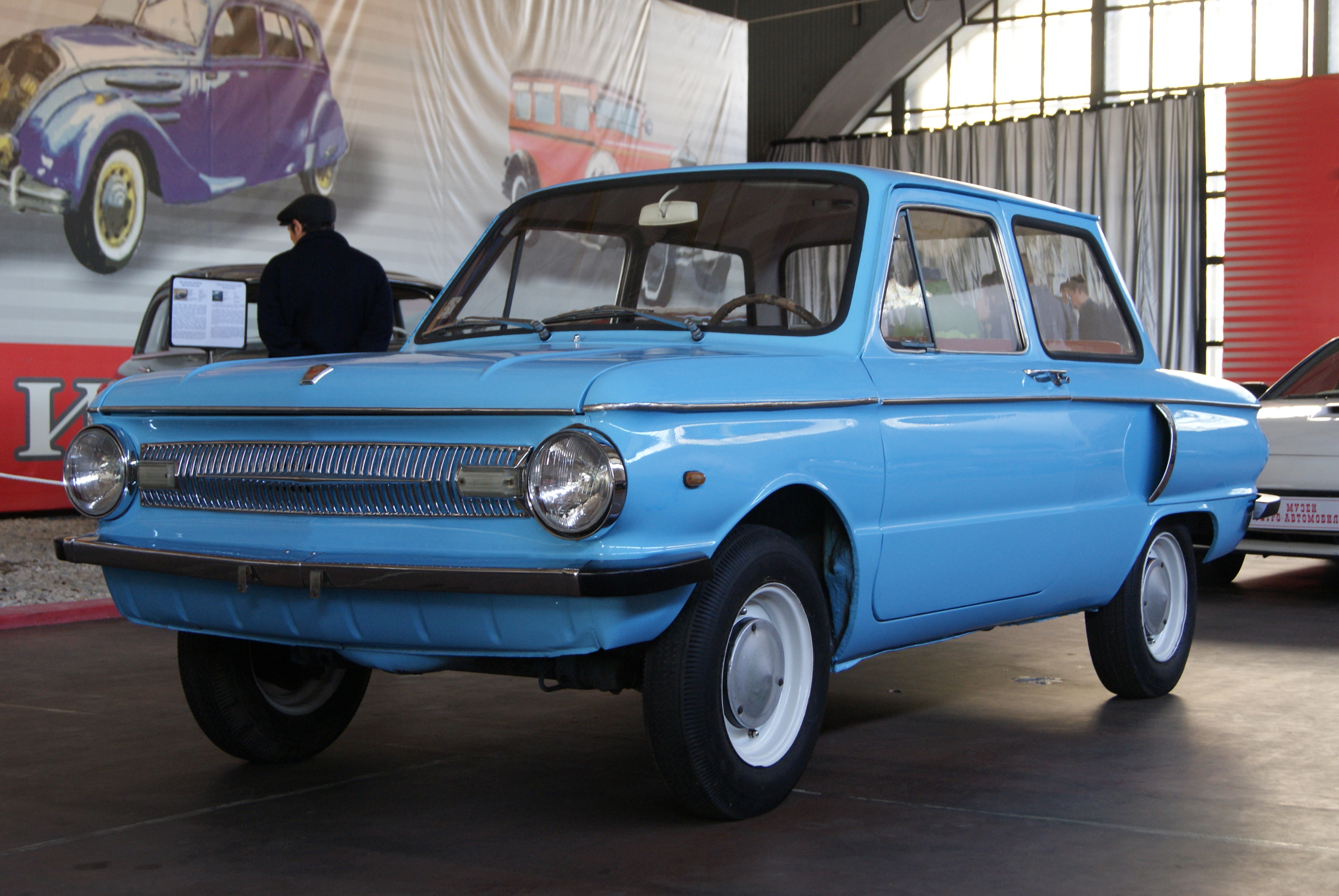
ZAZ-966

The second generation of the Zaporozhets was a series of subcompact cars, starting with the ZAZ-966, which entered production in November 1966, although the prototype was first demonstrated in 1961. It had a completely restyled bodywork (done entirely by ZAZ), no longer resembling the Fiat 600 and arguably similar to the Chevrolet Corvair, Hillman Imp or the NSU Prinz. This was an effort to cure some of the ZAZ-965's issues, such as torsion bars that lost tension, suicide doors, and engines that overheated and made the cabin uncomfortably loud. The engine was the 30 PS (22 kW) 887 cc (54.1 cu in) MeMZ-966A. A radio was standard equipment. The price had inched up, too, from 1,800 roubles at the ZAZ-965's debut to 2,200 by 1969.

While featuring a larger two-door notchback saloon body, it still featured an air-cooled V4 engine and featured more prominent air intakes – the so-called "ears", although a decorative chrome grille was also present. The car's rear suspension was also replaced. The ZAZ-966 started out as the simpler ZAZ-966V (ЗАЗ-966В in Cyrillic; В for "временный", temporary) with the 30 PS engine from the ZAZ-965A, which was also featured on some later models. Much like the ZAZ-965A, the ZAZ-966V was also produced in several special variants for disabled people until January 1973: the ZAZ-966VB (for drivers without both legs), ZAZ-966VB2 (for drivers without one leg), and ZAZ-966VBR (for drivers without one arm and one leg). The ZAZ-966 was produced in tandem with the ZAZ-965 from November 1966 to May 1969.

ZAZ launched the ZAZ-966 proper in 1968, powered by a new 40 PS (29 kW) 1,197 cc (73.0 cu in) MeMZ-968 V4, while the ZAZ-966V remained in parallel production as the budget variant, as well as the basis for all disability variants, which retained the 30-horsepower engine. The standard ZAZ-966, weighing in at 780 kg (1,720 lb), was heavier than the earlier model, but faster, reaching 75 mph (121 km/h). The ZAZ-966 family was discontinued in December 1972, more than a year after the introduction of the ZAZ-968.

Nicknamed "Zapo" in the Eastern Bloc, the ZAZ-966 also found some buyers in Western Europe, including Finland and France. Some markets swapped the original engine for a 956 cc (58.3 cu in) Renault unit.

=== ZAZ-968 ===
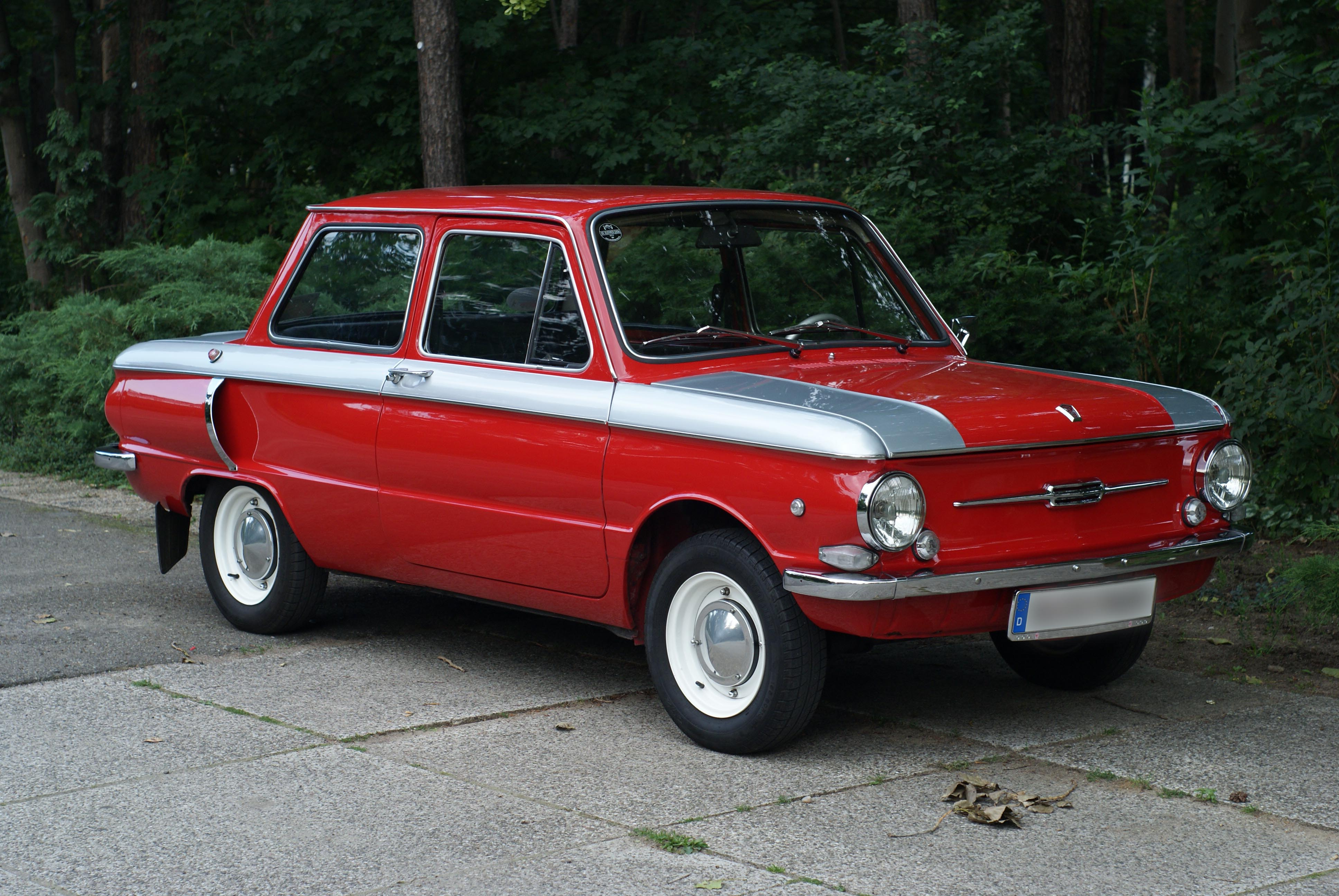
ZAZ-968 post-facelift

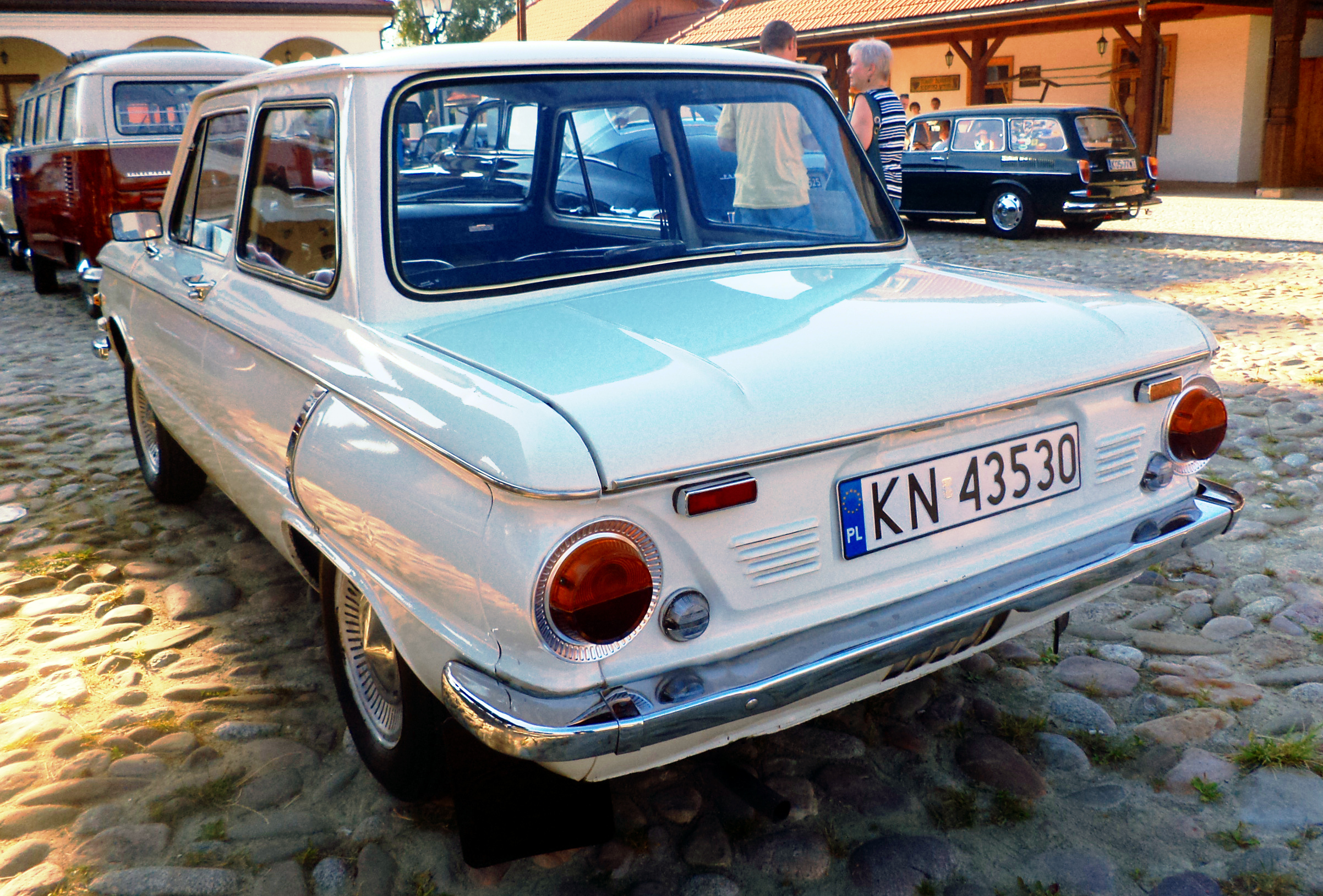
ZAZ-968 rear view

The ZAZ-968 and its variants were produced from spring 1971 to December 1979. It featured the same 40 hp (29 kW), 1,197 cc (73.0 cu in) MeMZ-968 V4 as the ZAZ-966, but the exterior design was slightly modernized. Originally, the ZAZ-968 had very few differences from the 966, specifically added reversing lights on the rear panel (the 966 had sockets cut for them on the body mold, but they were plated over on actual cars), shortened air intake "ears" (originally extended forward past the rear wheel arch, now ending at the middle of it), new simplified dashboard, updated brakes, slightly revised front light arrangement (new turn signal units) and reduced amount of exterior chrome; its main change was supposed to be the MeMZ-968G engine with higher output of 45 hp, but it was eventually cancelled before production, as the higher compression required the car to use the scarce high-grade AI-93 gasoline, defeating the purpose of a "people's car". The base ZAZ-968 was discontinued in 1978, having been produced simultaneously with the newer ZAZ-968A since 1974, with most of 968A's improvements gradually implemented on the "plain" 968 throughout its run.

In autumn 1973, the ZAZ-968 underwent a facelift, which replaced its faux grille with a narrow chrome molding, the front end underwent another lighting rearrangement (side markers and turn signals switched places) and the filler neck was relocated underneath the rear hood from its original position behind the left C-pillar. Toward the end of 1974, the up-market ZAZ-968A debuted, continuing in production until 1979. Among its improvements were double-circuit brakes, a new plastic-padded dashboard, energy-absorbing (collapsing) steering column, and seats from the VAZ-2101; it was visually identical to the updated 968. The export ZAZ-968E/968AE (mostly for the Eastern Bloc) had headlights modified to meet international standards, a safety glass windscreen, and an anti-theft steering lock, it was often equipped with 45-horsepower MeMZ-968G engine.

The ZAZ-968 family included six variants for disabled drivers. The ZAZ-968B (for drivers without both legs, MeMZ-966) had full hand controls: two "paddles" on the steering column for throttle, a brake lever to the bottom right of the steering wheel, and electromagnetic clutch control via a switch on the dashboard to the immediate right on the steering wheel. The ZAZ-968B2 (for drivers without one leg, MeMZ-966) had hand controls only for clutch via a lever to the upper right of the steering wheel, the throttle and brake pedals were unchanged. From 1975 onward, they were officially replaced by the ZAZ-968AB (for drivers without both legs, MeMZ-968), ZAZ-968AB2 and ZAZ-968AB4 (both for drivers without one leg, MeMZ-968), though residual production of the 968B2 and possibly 968B continued for a few more years. The ZAZ-968AB and 968AB2 used the 40hp 1.2L MeMZ-968 engine, but contrary to the "A" suffix, were derived from the base 968, with the ZAZ-968A features implemented gradually later. The ZAZ-968AB had its electromagnetic clutch control replaced by the same clutch lever as on the 968B2, otherwise the two had the same exact control setup as their predecessors. The ZAZ-968AB4 was completely identical to the 968AB2, except that it was the only disability ZAZ-968 variant to come with the full 968A package as standard. The ZAZ-968R (for drivers without one arm and one leg, MeMZ-966) had a specialized configuration to enable controlling the car with only one hand and one foot. The steering wheel had a joystick-like vertical tubular element on the side, with buttons for the lights, horn and gear shifting assistance; it could be mounted on either side of the steering wheel, depending on the driver's available arm. The gears were shifted via a U-shaped element located to the side of the driver's seat, where the driver had to put their leg, and the reverse gear was activated by a lever to the right of the driver next to the handbrake; similarly, the U-shaped element could be mounted on either side depending on the available leg. The throttle and brake pedals were unchanged, while the clutch was controlled via an electro-vacuum relay, located between the seats and activated via a switch on the dashboard to the immediate right on the steering wheel. The ZAZ-968R was nominally restricted to 60 km/h, as the driver's health conditions and the complex mechanical components could lead to unsafe driving conditions at high speed. It was the only variant to never receive ZAZ-968A features during its run.

=== ZAZ-968M ===
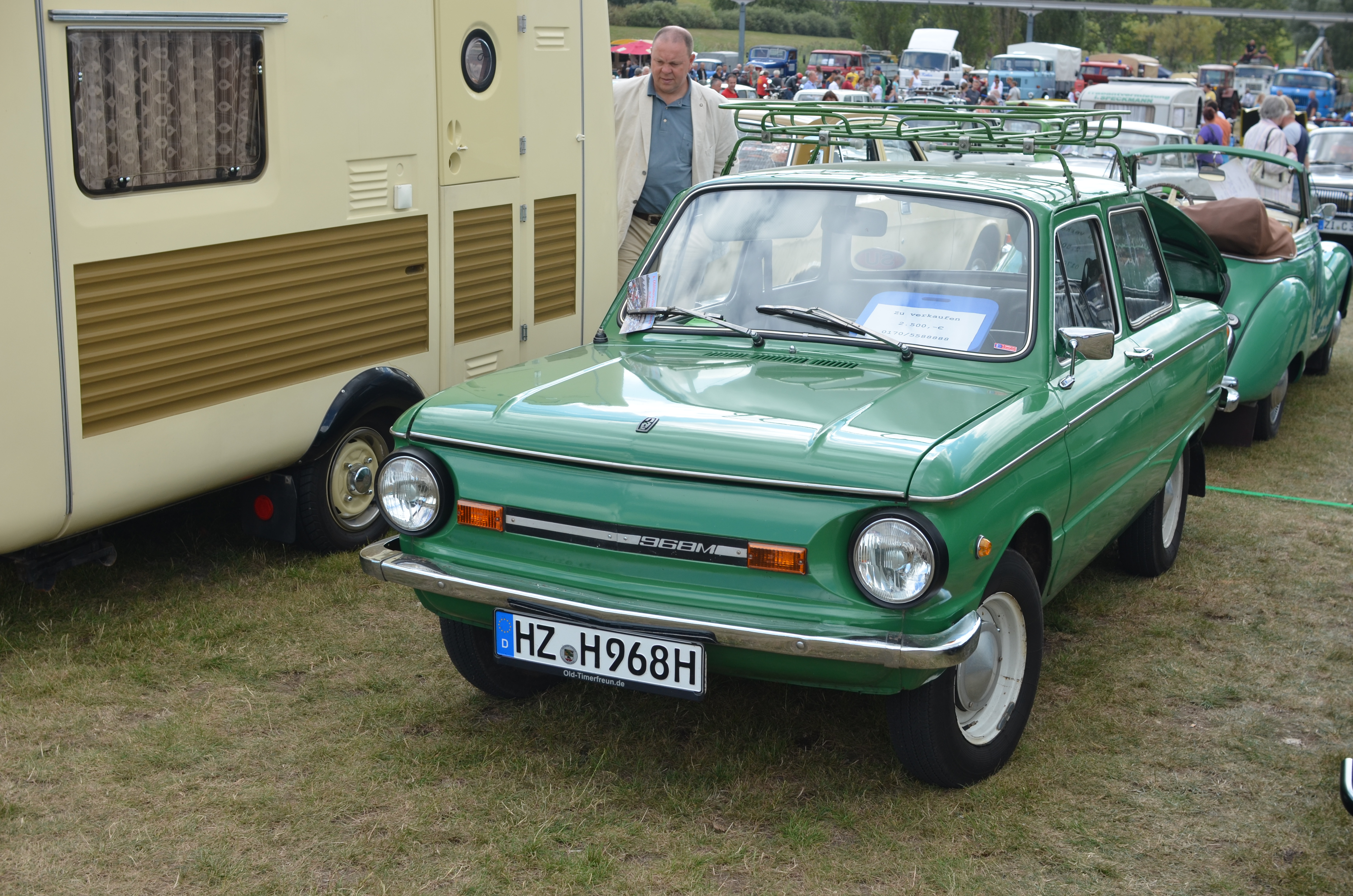
ZAZ-968M

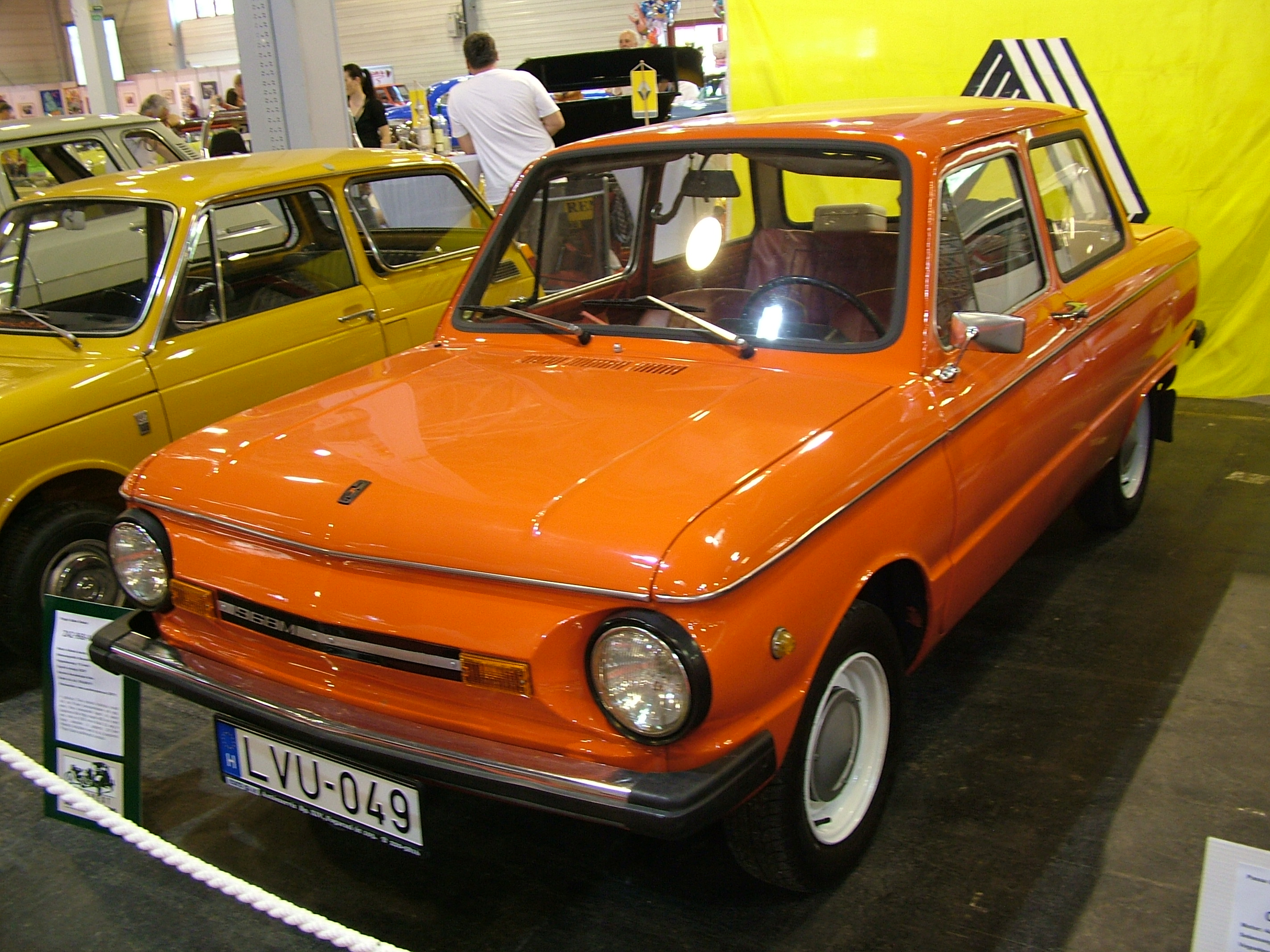
ZAZ-968M

In 1979, the ZAZ-968 series was replaced by the modernized ZAZ-968M. Prototyped in 1977, it had the "ears" removed and replaced much of the chrome exterior with black plastic. Its interior design was also upgraded, featuring an enclosed glove box and a slightly more modern dashboard. It was normally offered with the 1.2L MeMZ-968E 40 hp (29 kW), carbureted engine, with low compression for 76-octane fuel. Instead of the side-mounted "ears", the hood lid and rear quarter panels were louvered.

The ZAZ-968M was the last Zaporozhets model and also spent the most time in production, with cars being made from December 11, 1979 to June 1, 1994. By that time, the Soviet Union had collapsed, Ukraine had become independent, and modern front-wheel-drive economy cars from the West like the Volkswagen Polo and Ford Fiesta had become available in quantity, vehicles which the 1950s and 60s designed Zaporozhets had no hope of competing with. In addition to the base MeMZ-968, the 30hp MeMZ-966G 0.9L (887cc) engine returned to the conventional non-disability Zaporozhets, now designated ZAZ-968M-005, although it was manufactured in fairly small numbers compared to the 1.2L (1197cc) variants. High-powered variants of the MeMZ-968E were developed too, specifically the 45hp MeMZ-968G and 50hp MeMZ-968B, which used different carburetors and had higher compression, resulting in having AI-93 as the standard fuel; the former was used on some export ZAZ-968Ms through 1979-1983, and the latter is likely to have never entered series production.

The ZAZ-968M had four disability variants. The ZAZ-968MB (for drivers without legs, MeMZ-968E) had full hand controls: two "paddles" on the steering column for throttle, a brake lever to the bottom right of the steering wheel, and a clutch lever to the immediate right. An additional lever at the top right of the wheel was used for "constant throttle" to achieve smooth starts in difficult condition. In case if the driver's legs had limited usage, or if a family member was driving, the car retained the brake and clutch (but not throttle) pedals. The ZAZ-968MD (for drivers without one leg, MeMZ-968E) and ZAZ-968MG (for drivers without one leg, MeMZ-966G) had the same setup as the 968MB, but without the levers for clutch and "constant throttle"; the cars only had the clutch pedal, with both throttle and brake being hand-only.

The ZAZ-968MR (for drivers without one arm and one leg, MeMZ-968E) had a specialized configuration to enable controlling the car with only one hand and one foot, inheriting a modified variant of the ZAZ-968R control system. The steering wheel had a joystick-like vertical tubular element on the side attached perpendicular to the wheel's orientation, to make the steering wheel easy to operate with one hand. The tubular element also had buttons for the lights (including turn signals), the horn, and the gear shifting assistance electromagnetic solenoid controls; it could be mounted on either side of the steering wheel, depending on the driver's available arm. The gears were shifted via a U-shaped element located to the side of the driver's seat, the driver had to put their leg into it at the thigh level, and thrust the element forward or to the sides with their body to change gears, assisted by electromagnetic solenoid controls on the steering wheel, and the reverse gear was activated by a lever to the right of the driver next to the handbrake; similarly, the U-shaped element could be mounted on either side depending on the available leg. The throttle and brake pedals were unchanged, though the throttle pedal could be relocated to the left if the driver's right leg was amputated. The clutch was controlled via an electro-vacuum relay, located between the seats where the gear shifter normally is, activated via a switch on the dashboard to the immediate right on the steering wheel; for cases when the relay was malfunctioning, the car retained the standard clutch pedal too. While capable of achieving the same top speed of 118 km/h, the ZAZ-968MR was nominally restricted to 60 km/h, as the driver's health conditions and the complex mechanical components could lead to unsafe driving conditions at high speed.

Planned ZAZ-968s with 1.3 or 1.4 L (79 or 85 cu in) engines would never enter production, likely a side effect of the stagnation of Russia in the 1970s and 80s and the subsequent reign of Gorbachev, the fall of the Berlin Wall, and the breakup of the Soviet Union occupying more attention than a little Ukrainian-built economy car whose mechanicals dated back to 1959.

=== Export versions ===
Among the export variants produced by ZAZ were ZAZ-965E, ZAZ-965AE, ZAZ-966E, ZAZ-968E, and ZAZ-968AE, which had improved features compared to vehicles made for the home market. Depending on target markets, the model names Jalta or Eliette were used for these cars.

In total, 3,422,444 Zaporozhets vehicles were manufactured in the Melitopol factory from 1960 to 1994, with all of them using the same family of air cooled V-4 engines mounted in the back.

== In popular culture ==
In the 1963 Soviet romantic comedy Three Plus Two, a ZAZ-965 with license plate number 18-15-лдг is featured in numerous scenes throughout the movie, and is even referred to directly in the script as "a tin can of the Zaporozhets system".

In the 1995 James Bond film GoldenEye, Bond's CIA contact Jack Wade drove a 1963 ZAZ-965A.

In the 2011 animated feature film Cars 2, the Trunkovs (Vladimir, Petrov, Lubewig, and Tolga) are based on the ZAZ-968 Zaporozhets.

In the video game MudRunner, a car based on the ZAZ-968 is found in several maps named A-968M.

In Half-Life 2 the car is shown in dilapidated condition as a prop that clutters some roads.

It also appears as a prop in the S.T.A.L.K.E.R. games.

== See also ==
Similar air-cooled and rear-engined vehicles:

- Chevrolet Corvair
- NSU Prinz 4
- Hillman Imp
- Hino Contessa
- Volkswagen Type 3
