= ZAZ Tavria =

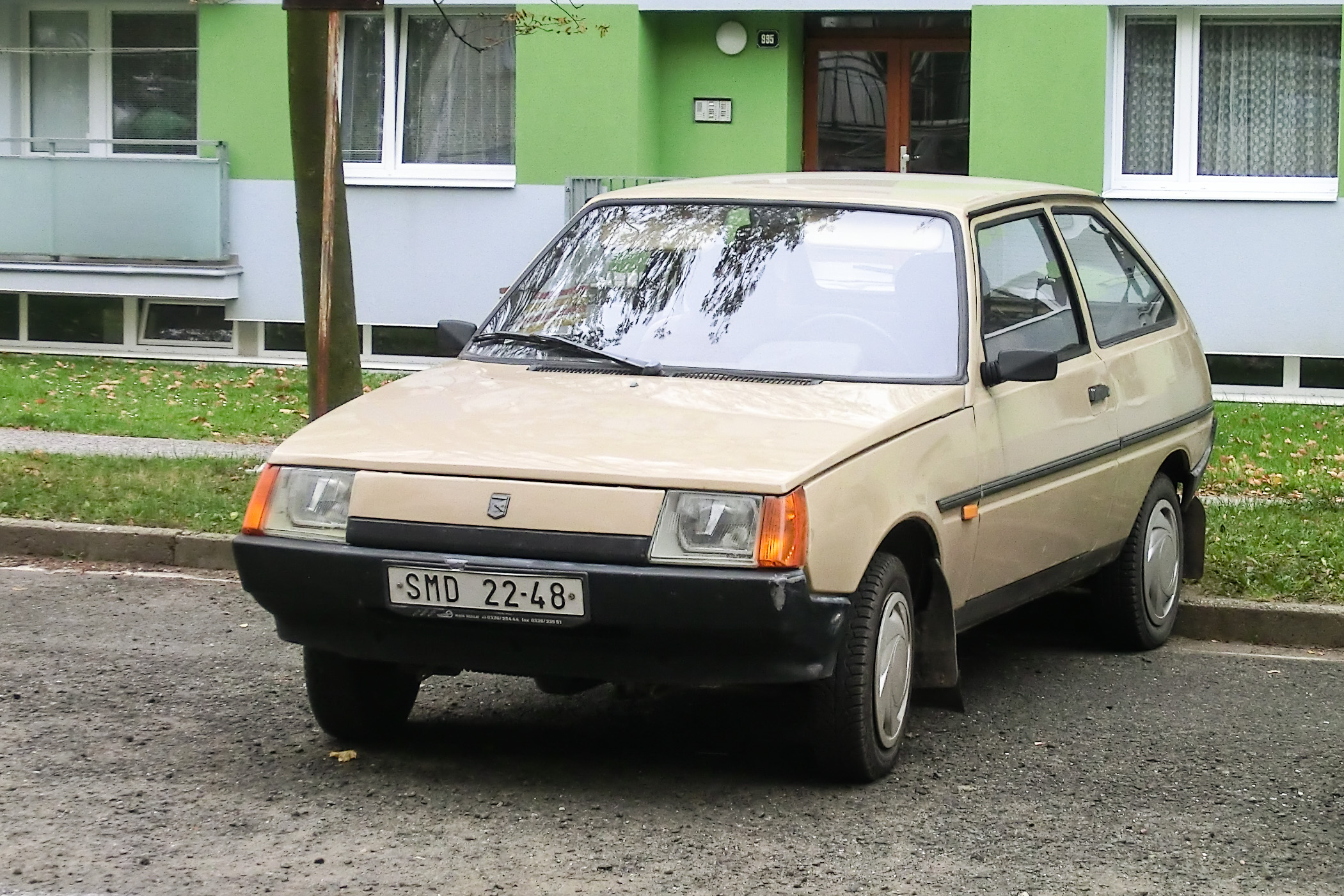
- ZAZ-1102 Tavria (facelift)

Overview
- Manufacturer: ZAZ
- Also called: Lada Tavria (Europe, Middle East and Chile); Tavria (South America)
- Production: 1987–2007 (ZAZ-1102 Tavria); 1998–2007 (ZAZ-1102 Tavria Nova); 1999–2011 (ZAZ-1103 Slavuta); 1994–1997 (ZAZ-1105 Dana); 1999–2010 (ZAZ-11055 Tavria)
- Assembly: Soviet Union / Ukraine: Zaporizhzhia

Body and chassis
- Class: Subcompact car
- Body style: 3-door hatchback 5-door liftback 5-door estate
- Layout: Front-engine, front-wheel-drive
- Related: VAZ-2108

Powertrain
- Engine: MeMZ-245; MeMZ-2457; MeMZ-307; FIAT-903; VAZ-2108
- Transmission: 4-speed manual 5-speed manual

Dimensions
- Length: 3708 mm
- Width: 1554 mm
- Height: 1410 mm
- Kerb weight: 709 kg

Chronology
- Predecessor: ZAZ Zaporozhets
- Successor: ZAZ Lanos

ZAZ Tavria (Ukrainian: ЗАЗ Таврія) is a range of front-wheel-drive subcompact cars produced by ZAZ, a manufacturer based in the Ukrainian Soviet Socialist Republic and, after 1991, Ukraine.

ZAZ-1102 Tavria and subsequent ZAZ-1102 Tavria Nova, ZAZ-1105 Dana, ZAZ-1103 Slavuta and ZAZ-11055 Tavria Pick-Up replaced the rear wheel drive Zaporozhets series in the product lineup.

Production of all ZAZ Tavria models (except for ZAZ-11055 pickup and ZAZ-1103 Slavuta saloon) stopped in 2007.

== Variants ==
=== ZAZ-1102 Tavria ===
In the 1970s, several experimental models of hatchback and two-door sedan were created in the USSR.

ZAZ-1102 Tavria, a 3-door hatchback released in 1987, was the first model of the range. It features independent MacPherson strut suspension at the front and a twist-beam rear suspension. The water-cooled MeMZ-245 I4 engine was a major shift forward from the air-cooled V4 used in former models.

The 1102 acquired the Tavria name in 1989. It was chosen in an internal factory contest and resembles Tauric, the ancient Greek name of Crimea.

ZAZ-1102 "Tavria" became the basis for a whole line of cars, which are both directly modifications of the base model (more than 40 different variants), and independent models on its platform, such as: "five-door liftback" ZAZ-1103 "Slavuta", "Five-door station wagon" ZAZ-1105 "Dana" and commercial pickup truck ZAZ-11055 "Pick-Up".

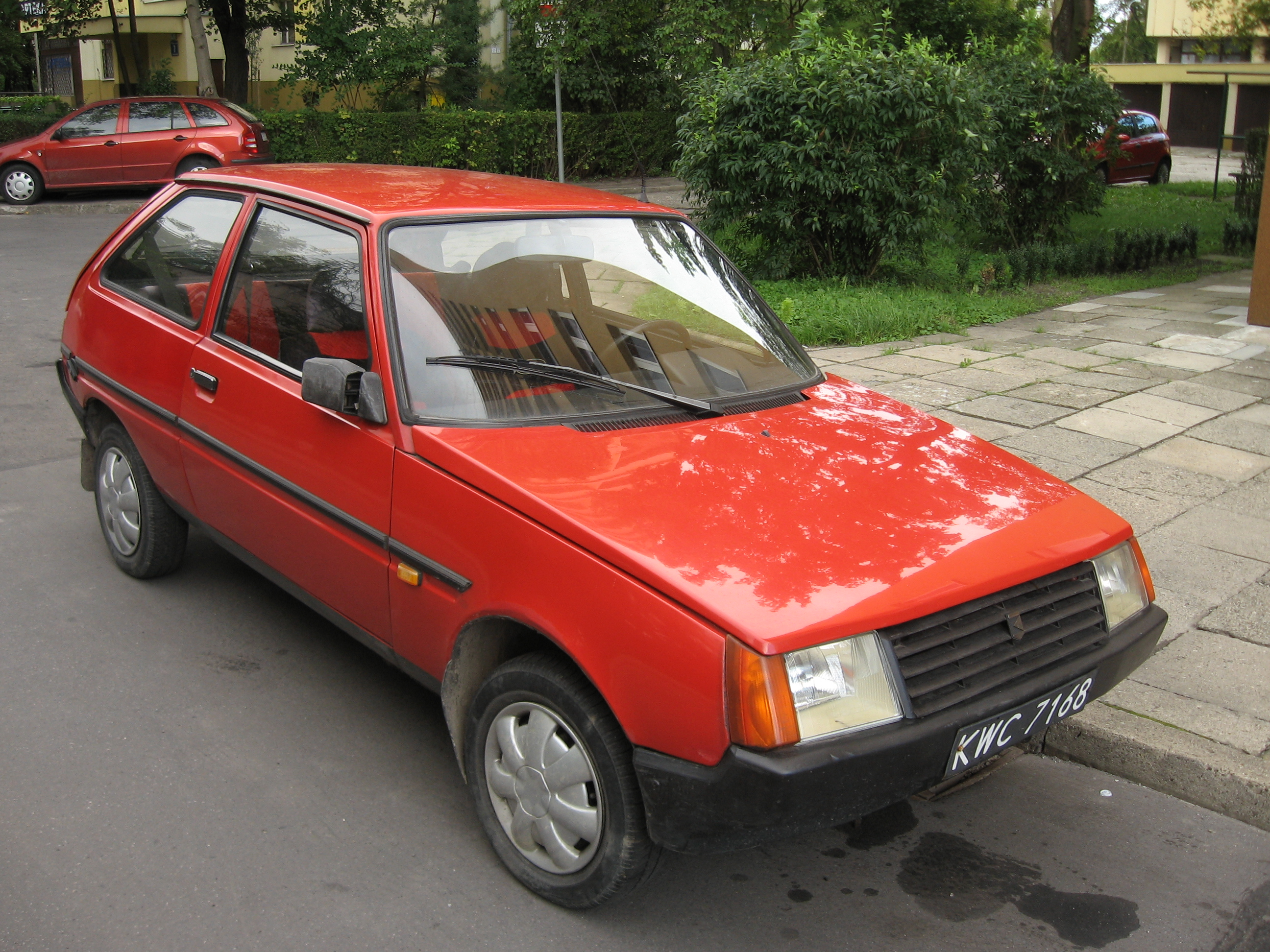
1987 ZAZ 1102 Tavria (pre-facelift)

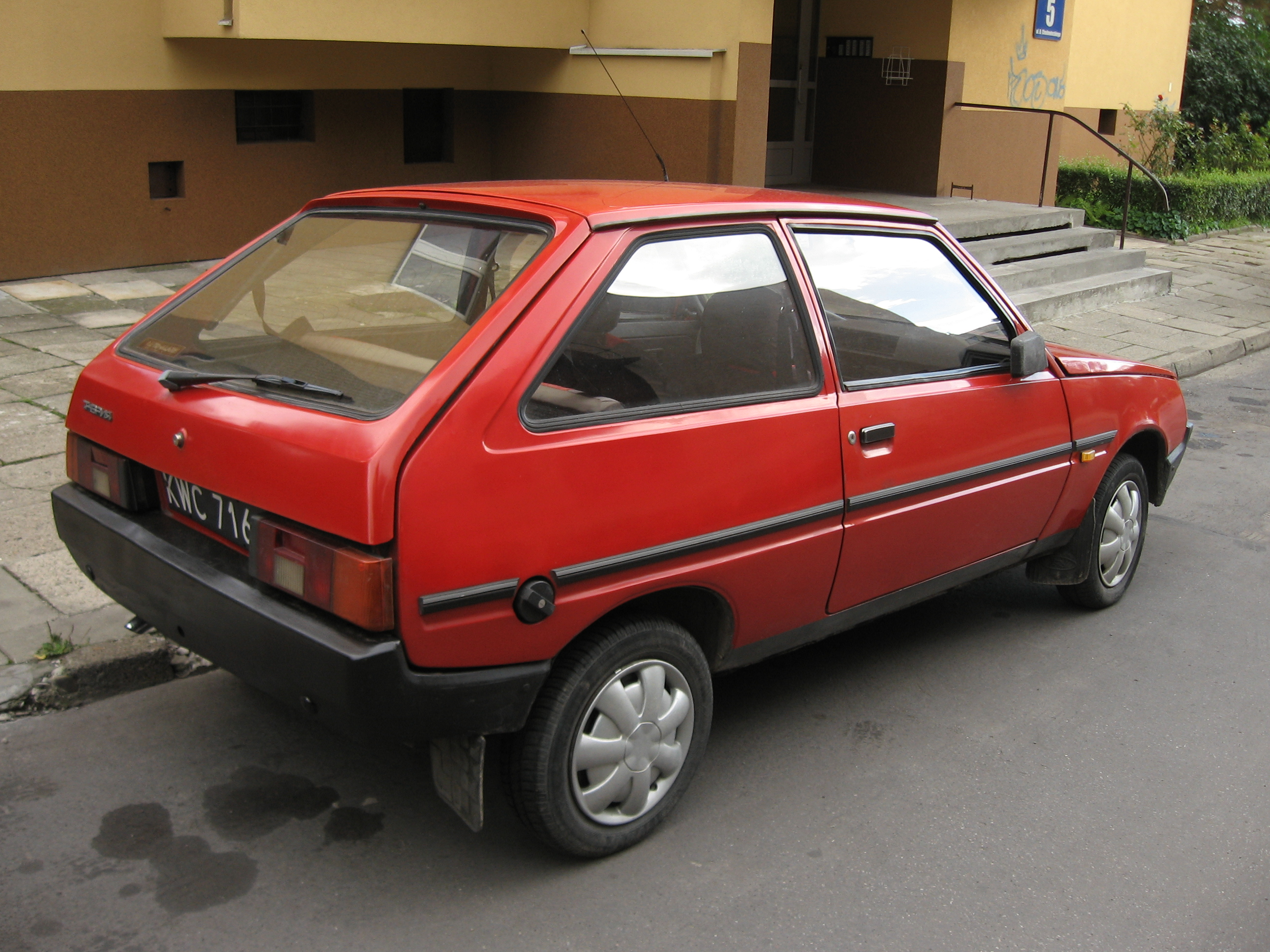
Rear view

=== ZAZ-1102 Tavria Nova ===
1990 ZAZ 1102 Tavria (facelift)

ZAZ-1102 Tavria Nova production started in 1999. "Tavria Nova" is a modification created jointly with Daewoo, aimed at eliminating the identified deficiencies and improving technical and operational indicators. A cosmetic modernization of the radiator grille, headlights and taillights was carried out, as well as new decorative caps on 4.5J wheel rims with tubeless tires began to be used, a third brake light was installed on the rear door. To improve the reliability of the car and increase the level of passive safety, the load-bearing and technological elements of the body were reinforced, which made it possible to reduce the noise level in the cabin.

In 2006 and 2007, the plant's management announced several times about the imminent withdrawal of the model from production. The mass production of the ZAZ-1102 "Tavria" hatchback model was completed in 2007, although at least two more batches were assembled in 2008 and 2009.

=== ZAZ-110240 ===
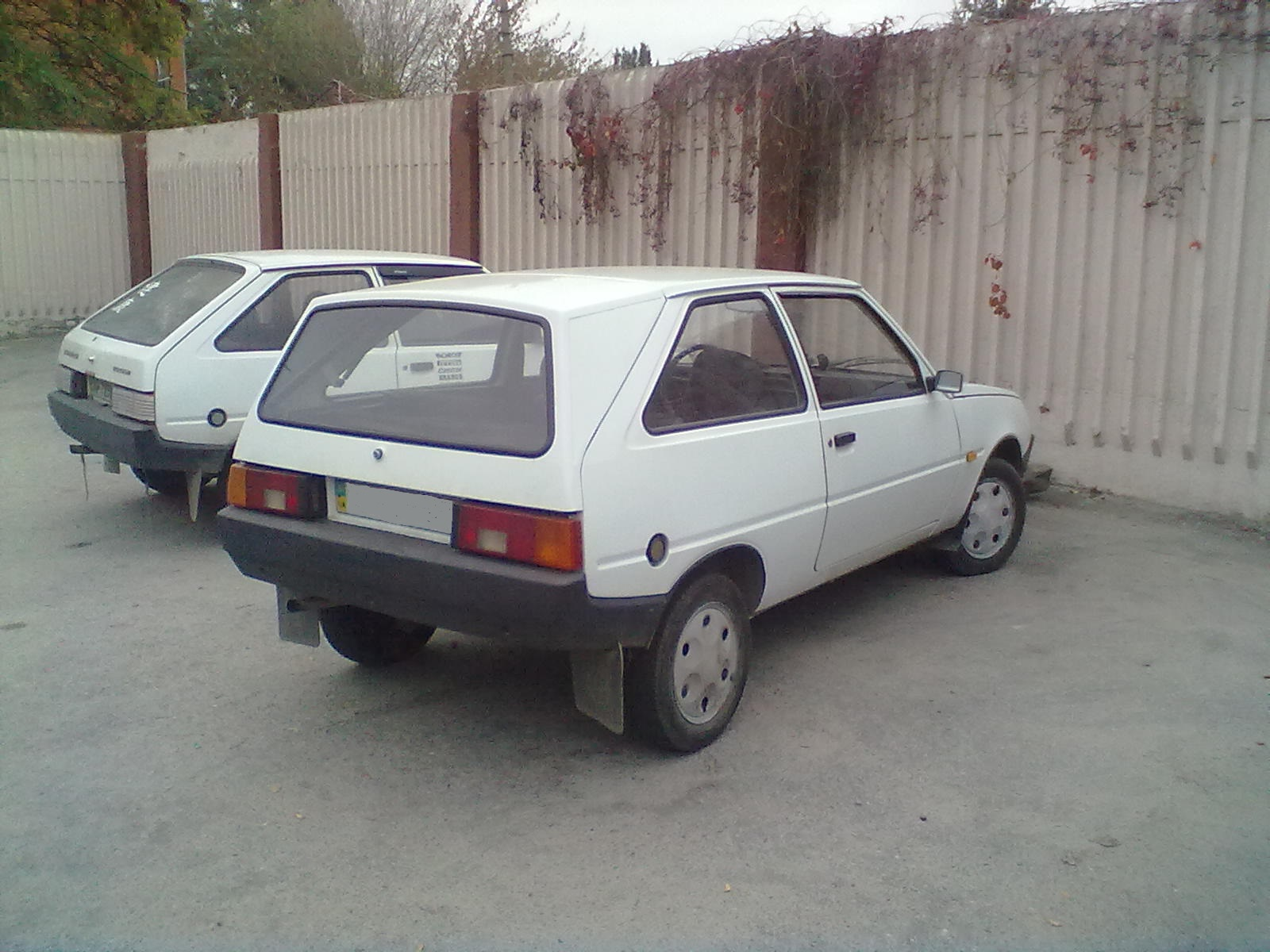
ZAZ-110240 "Tavria" with an enlarged trunk

The ZAZ-110240 is a cargo variant of the ZAZ-1102 Tavria. Production began in 1991 under the name ZAZ-11024 and continued until 1997 on the basis of ZAZ-110206. To increase the useful volume of the trunk, the tailgate of the ZAZ-1102 hatchback was changed with a new extended hatch to increase the volume of the trunk. The curb weight of the car has increased by 33 kg compared to the base hatchback. The passenger folding rear sofa was preserved, however.

=== ZAZ-1103 Slavuta ===
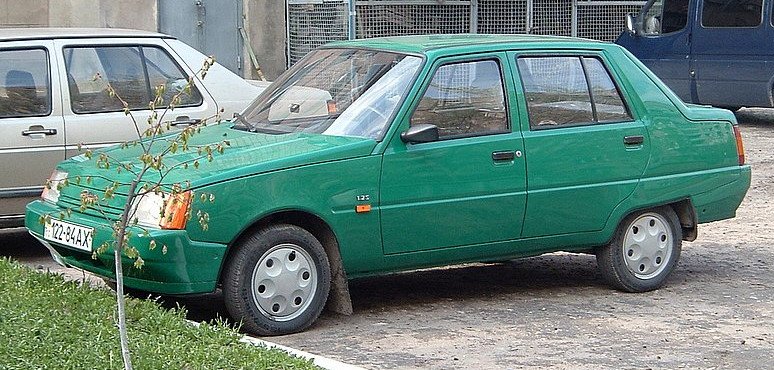
ZAZ-1103 Slavuta

ZAZ-1103 Slavuta was a B-class liftback released in 1995 and discontinued in 2011. It featured a fuel injection engine of 1,2–1,3 liters. Due to the use of a completely new liftback type body with an elongated roof line and more rounded contours of the hood and trunk lid, turn indicators were moved onto the headlamp assemblies and rain gutters from above the doors were removed. The aerodynamics were improved, luggage compartment volume was increased, the loading height lowered by 60 cm, and the dirtying of the rear glass in rainy weather was decreased. When ZAZ started the production of Chevrolet Lanos, some design elements of Chevrolet Lanos (such as seat and door parts) were added to the Slavuta.

During the period of production more than 140 000 cars were produced. In January 2011 the last car of the ZAZ-1103 "Slavuta" model was produced by the ZAZ line, and it was sold during an online auction on February 11, 2011, for ₴47,020. ZAZ Forza became the direct descendant of Slavuta on the line. ZAZ-Slavuta and ZAZ-Tavria family were the last wholly Ukrainian cars.

In 2004 the Slavuta was awarded zero stars out of a possible four by the Russian ARCAP safety assessment program.

=== ZAZ-1105 Dana ===
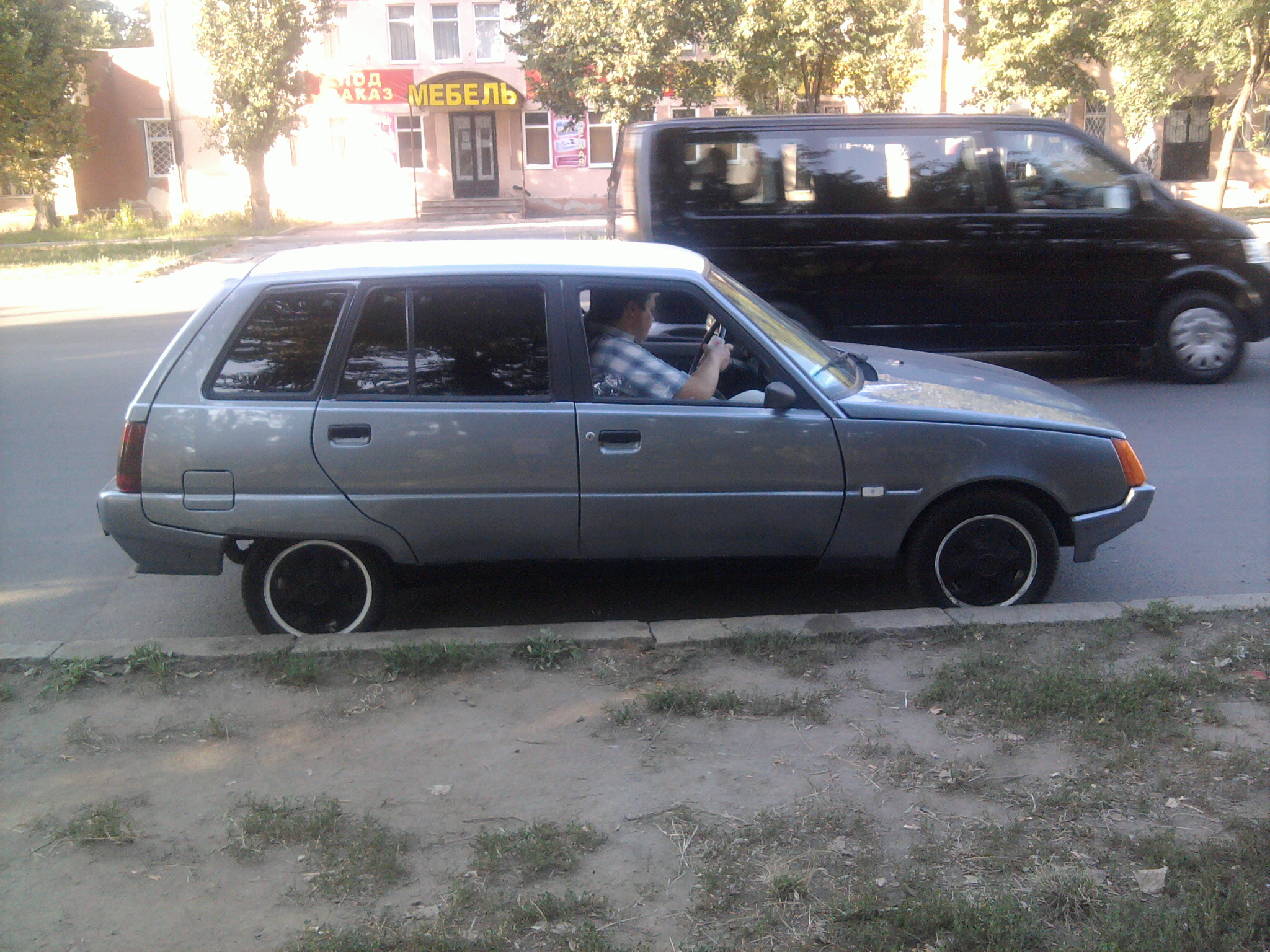
ZAZ-1105 Dana

ZAZ-1105 Dana, a 5-door wagon version was released in 1992 and discontinued in 1999. Since 1996, a commercial van has been made. The latest version uses updated MeMZ-301 engines with fuel injection. Compared to the standard "Tavria" it had improved aerodynamics.

=== ZAZ-11055 Tavria Pick-Up ===
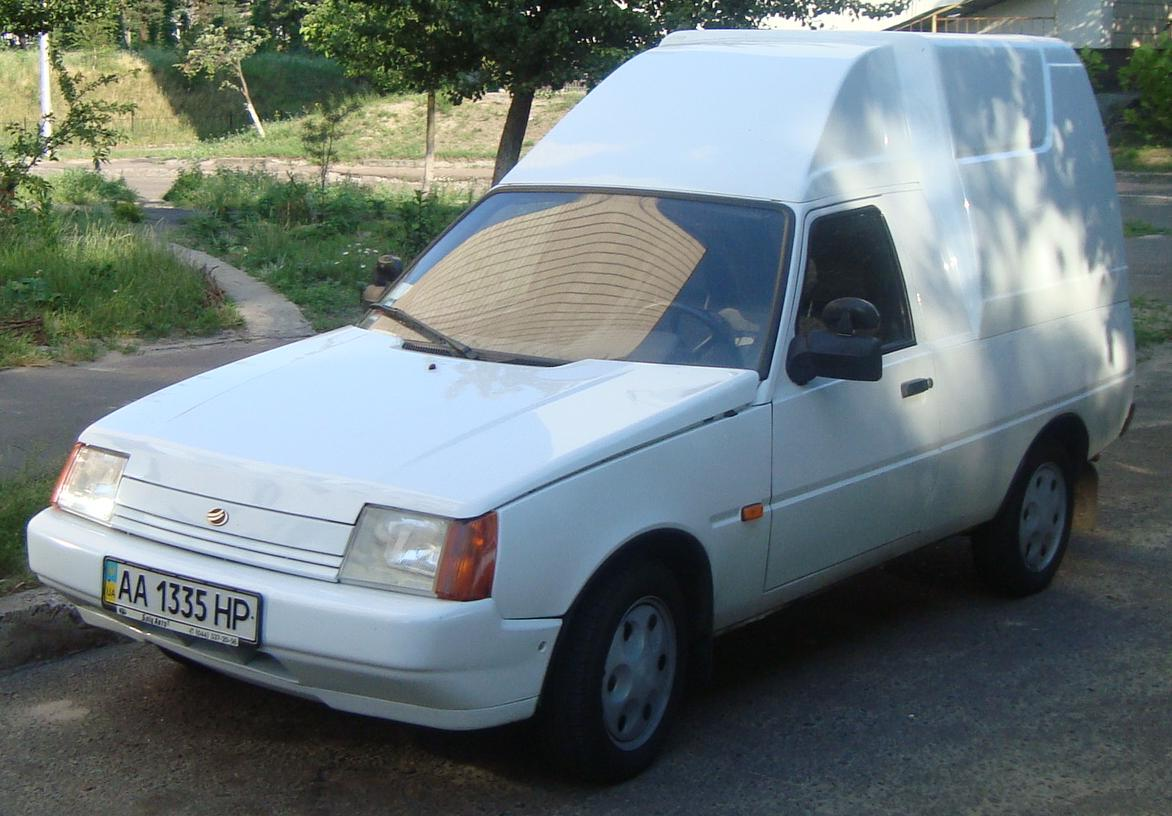
ZAZ-11055 Tavria Pick-up

ZAZ-11055 Tavria Pick-Up is a commercial vehicle designed for small cargo transportation. In contrast to the passenger models, the pickup has a fiberglass cargo compartment and plastic upper cover. The Tavria Pick-Up has a body 20 cm longer than the passenger model.

Tavria Pick-Up is designated for cargo transportation, and its front support beam is made of thicker metal than in hatchback (3.2 mm instead of 2.8 mm). It was powered by a MeMZ-310 engine (1.1–1.3 liters).

Tavria Pick-Up behaves well on uneven roads due to the reinforced structure of the rear suspension. It is more rigid compared to the passenger hatchback. This also increased the vehicle's carrying capacity to 420 kg. The fiberglass cargo compartment is rigidly screwed to body. It measures 1250 mm high and 1300 mm wide. The length of cargo is 1320 mm, but it is possible to open the upper rear hatch, which is supported by pneumatic struts to transport longer items. The large area of the rear hatches of tail gate perfectly suits small traders. As such the car can be used as mobile trading stall. The lower part of the hatch can be opened to create a 'counter'.

== Outside the USSR ==
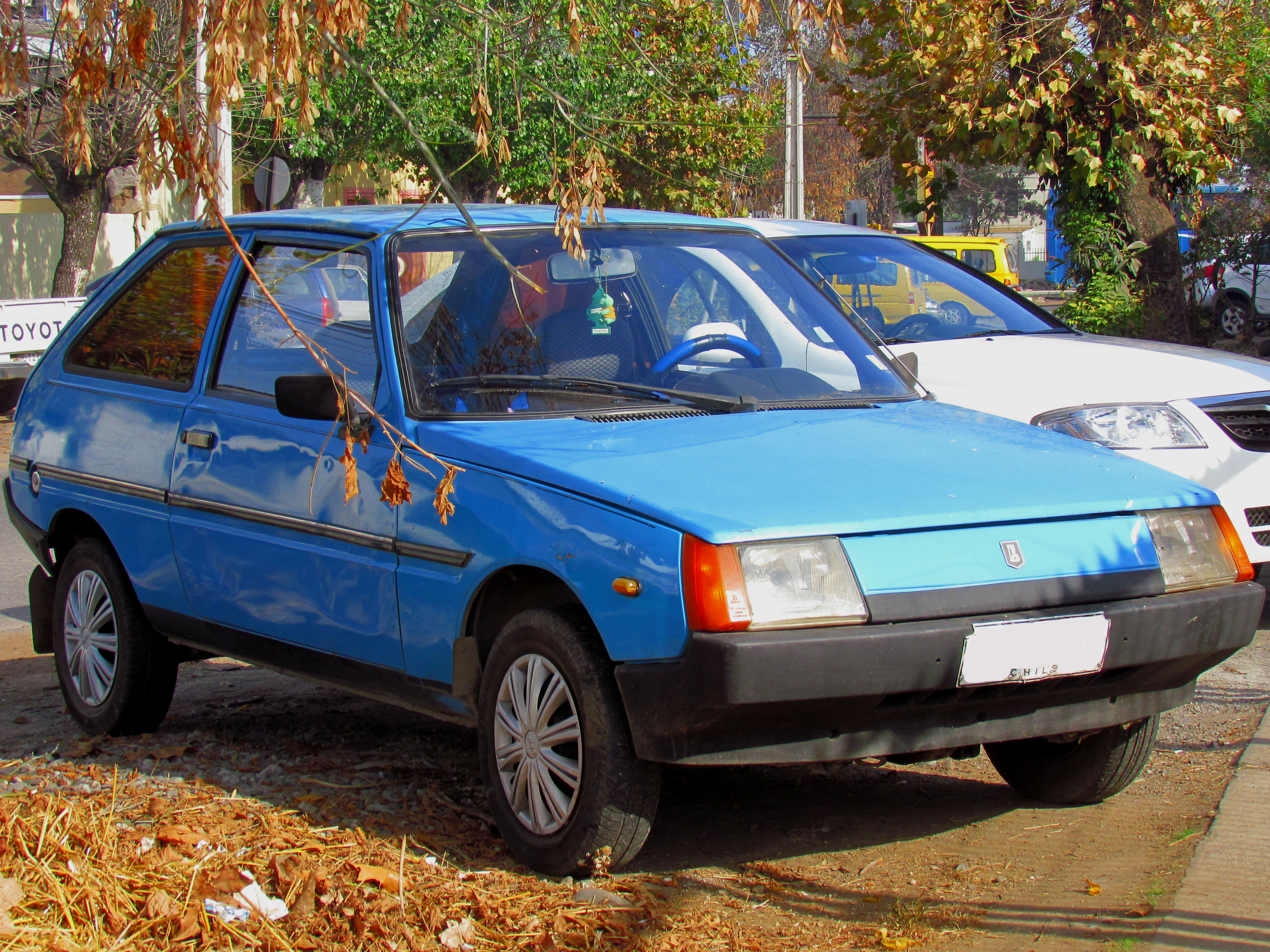
Lada Tavria (Chile)

Producers positioned Tavria as an economy-class car. It was sold in Chile as the Lada Tavria in the early 1990s, and in Colombia between 1992 and 1995. The 3-door hatchbacks were sold in Argentina from 1992 to 1995.

In 1989 the USSR Ministry of Automobile industry released a promotional video targeting the Western market, which won the Cannes Bronze Lion for trade ads.

== Further usage of the nameplate ==
In 2016 in Kyiv ZAZ unveiled the facelifted version of the rebadged Chery Fulwin 2. The model used to be called ZAZ Forza but the company planned to rename it to ZAZ Slavuta Nova. The serial production of the model had never began.
