= List of trolleybus manufacturers =

Since the invention of the trolleybus, well over 200 different builders of trolleybuses have existed. This is a list of trolleybus manufacturers, both current and former.

== Current ==
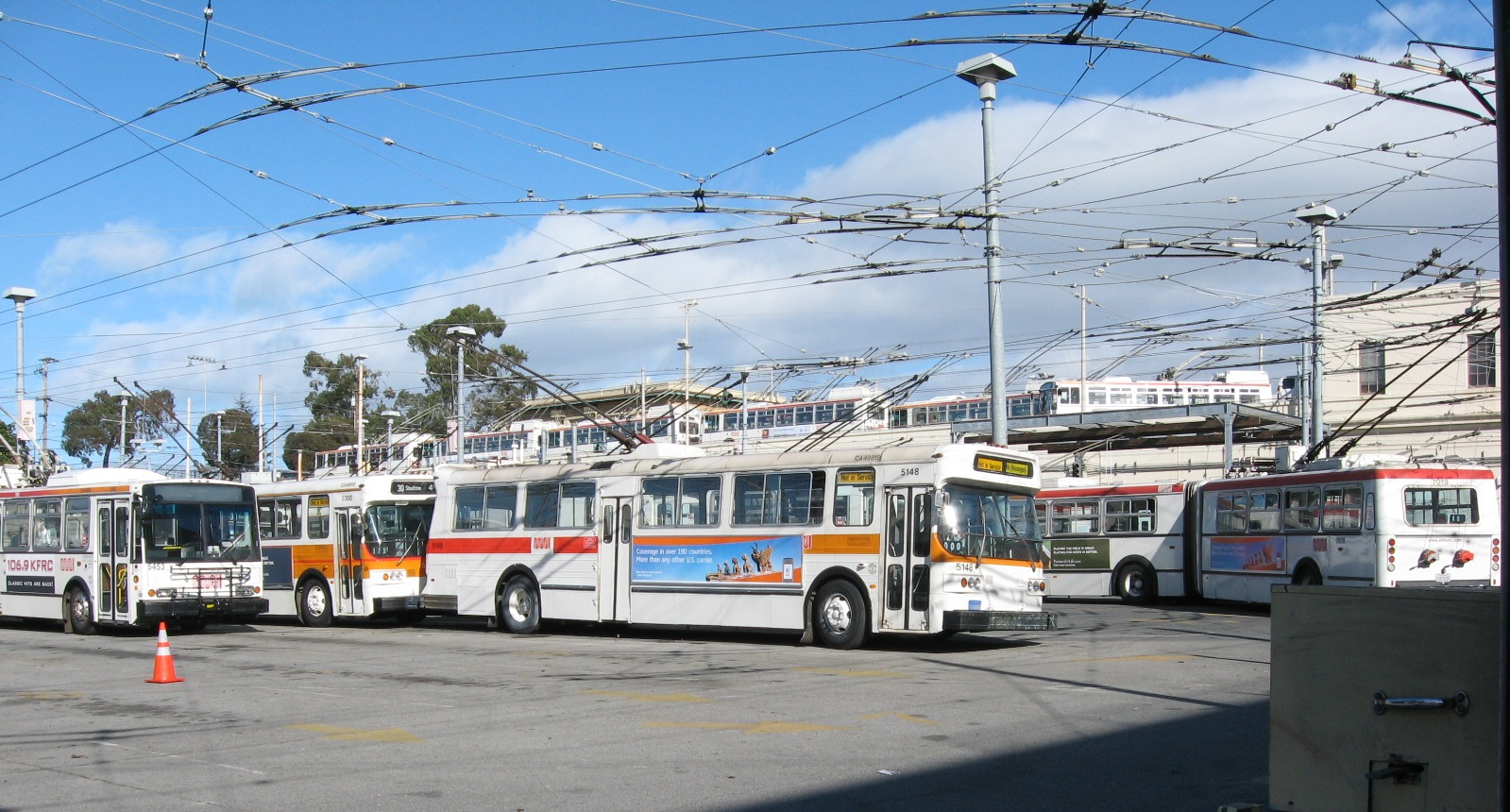
Trolleybus garage (depot) in San Francisco, USA, with a range of Muni's trolleybuses dating from 1976 to 2003. On the left is an ETI (Skoda/AAI) 14TrSF trolleybus, which type replaced the non-accessible Flyer trolleybuses in the center. On the right is an articulated New Flyer trolleybus, one of 60 articulated ETBs built by New Flyer for Muni in 1993-94

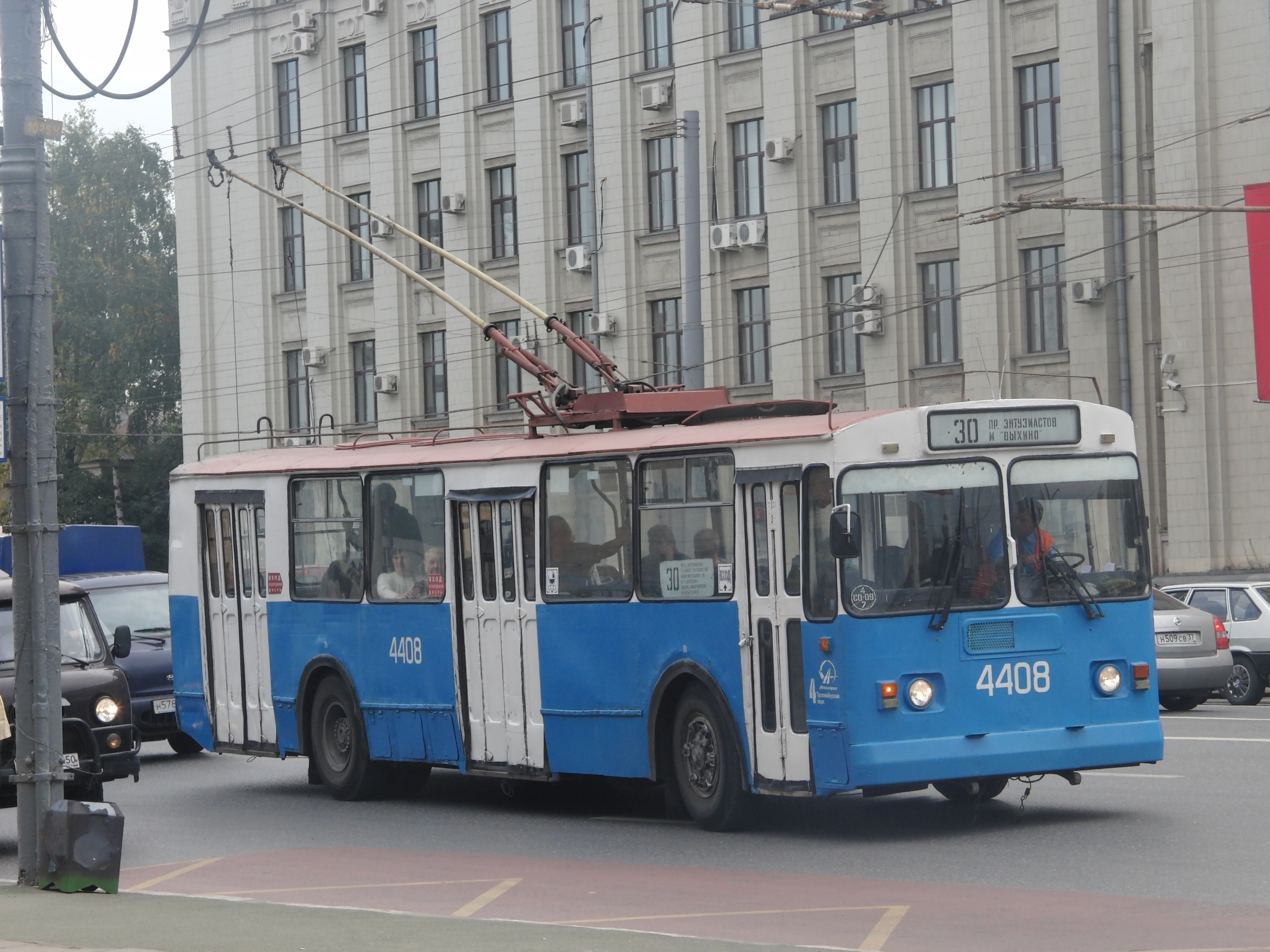
ZiU-9/682 is the most numerous trolleybus model in the world (over 42,000 trolleybuses were produced since 1972)

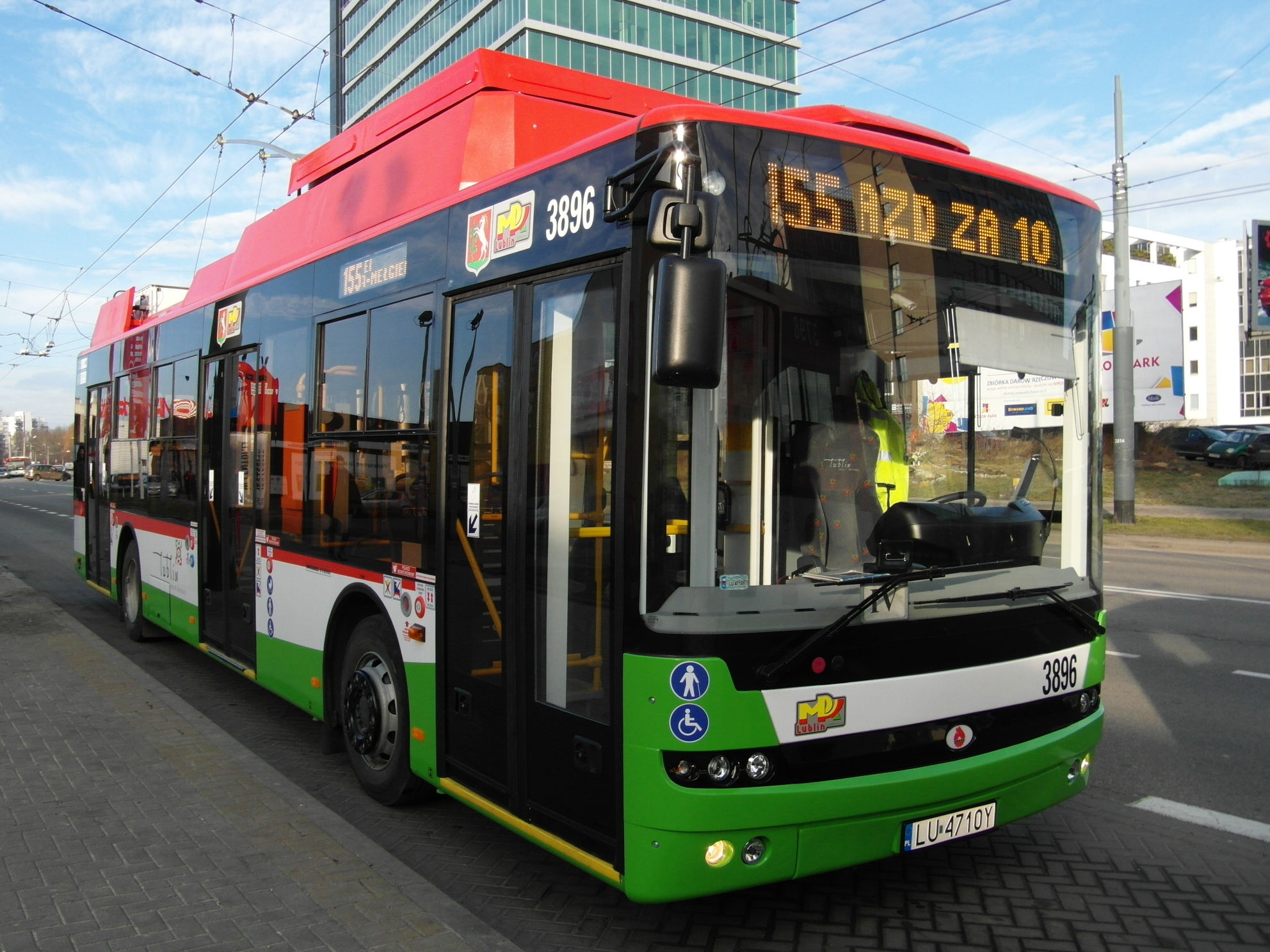
Bogdan/Ursus Т701.16 in Lublin

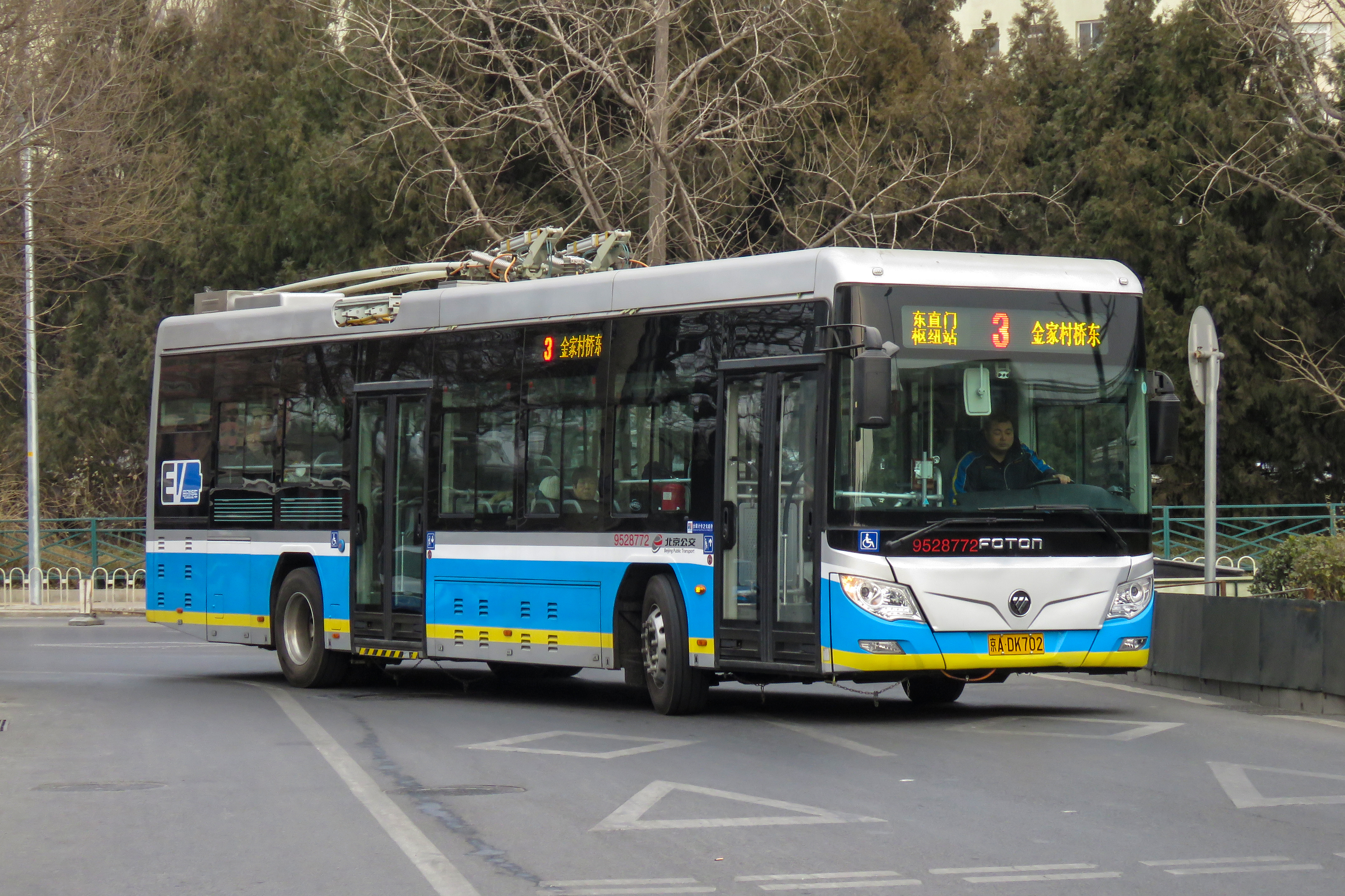
Foton BJD-WG120FN bimodal trolleybus in Beijing

Company	Country	Notes
Astra Bus	Romania	
Belkommunmash	Belarus	
Bogdan	Ukraine	
Bozankaya	Turkey	
CAIO Induscar^{PT}	Brazil	
Chongjin Bus Factory	North Korea	
Dongfeng Yangtse	China	
Electron Corporation	Ukraine	
Eletra Industrial^{PT}	Brazil	
Etalon	Ukraine	
Foton Motor	China	
Iveco	Italy	Fiat Group
Irisbus	Italy	Fiat Group, with electrical equipment by Škoda
Gillig	United States	electrical equipment by Kiepe Electric
Hamhung bus repair plant	North Korea	
Hess	Switzerland	
KAMAZ	Russia	
Kiepe Electric	Germany	electrical equipment only – usually as a subcontractor to various bus builders for bodies and chassis; however, for Dayton (USA), Kiepe was the lead contractor, and installed its electrical equipment in otherwise complete vehicles built by Gillig as a subcontractor to Kiepe
MAZ	Belarus	
New Flyer Industries	Canada	
PC Transport Systems	Russia	
Pivdenmash	Ukraine	
Pyongsong bus repair plant	North Korea	
Pyongyang Trolleybus Factory	North Korea	
Sinara Transport Machines	Russia	
Škoda Electric	Czech Republic	Complete buses with Temsa bodies or electrical drive equipment only with various bus builders as subcontractor for bodies and chassis
Solaris Bus & Coach	Poland	electrical equipment by Škoda, Kiepe Electric and Medcom
SOR Libchavy	Czech Republic	electrical equipment by Škoda and Rail Electronics CZ
Sunwin	China	
Trans-Alfa (VMZ)	Russia	
Ufa Tram and Trolleybus Plant (UTTZ)	Russia	formerly Bashkir Trolleybus Plant (BTZ)
Volgabus	Russia	
Youngman	China	
Yutong	China	
Zhongtong Bus	China	

== Former ==
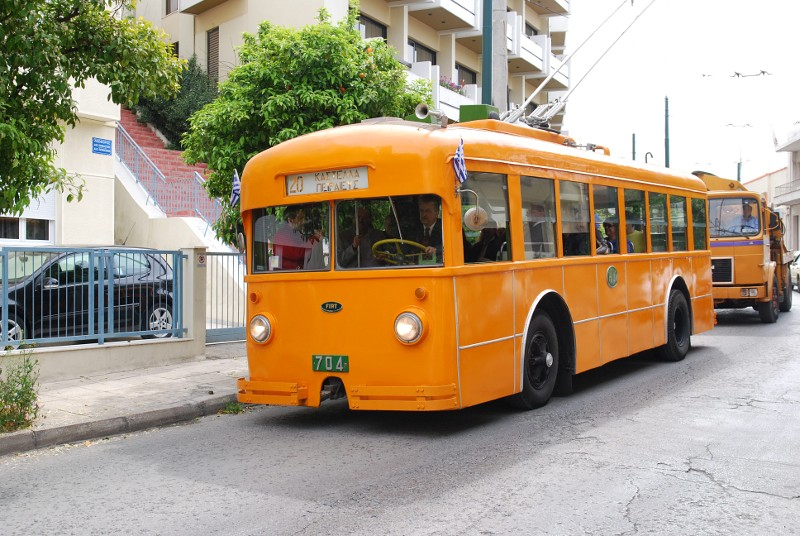
Preserved vintage trolleybus made by FIAT for the Piraeus-Kastella line in Greece (1939)

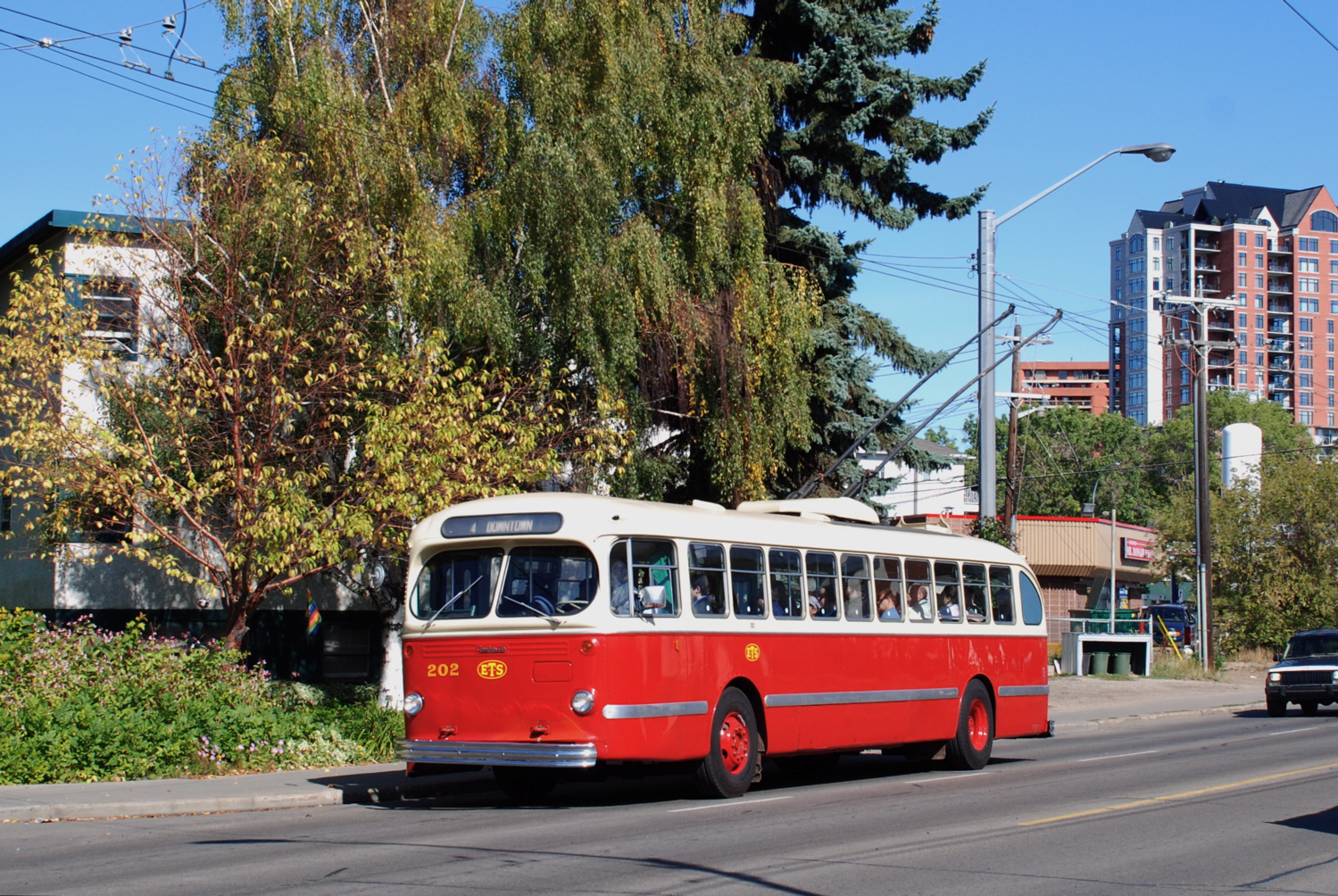
1954 CCF–Brill trolleybus in Edmonton

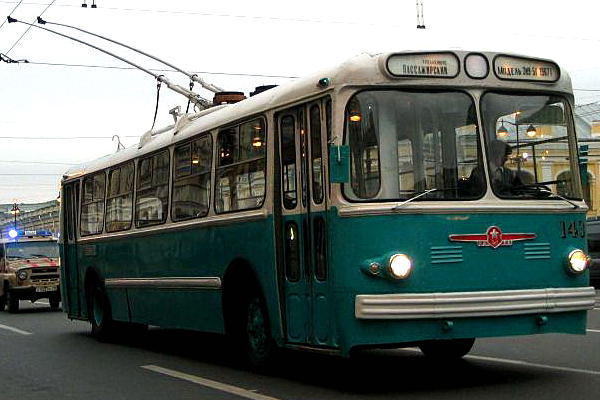
ZiU-5 during the parade of vintage automobiles, Saint Petersburg

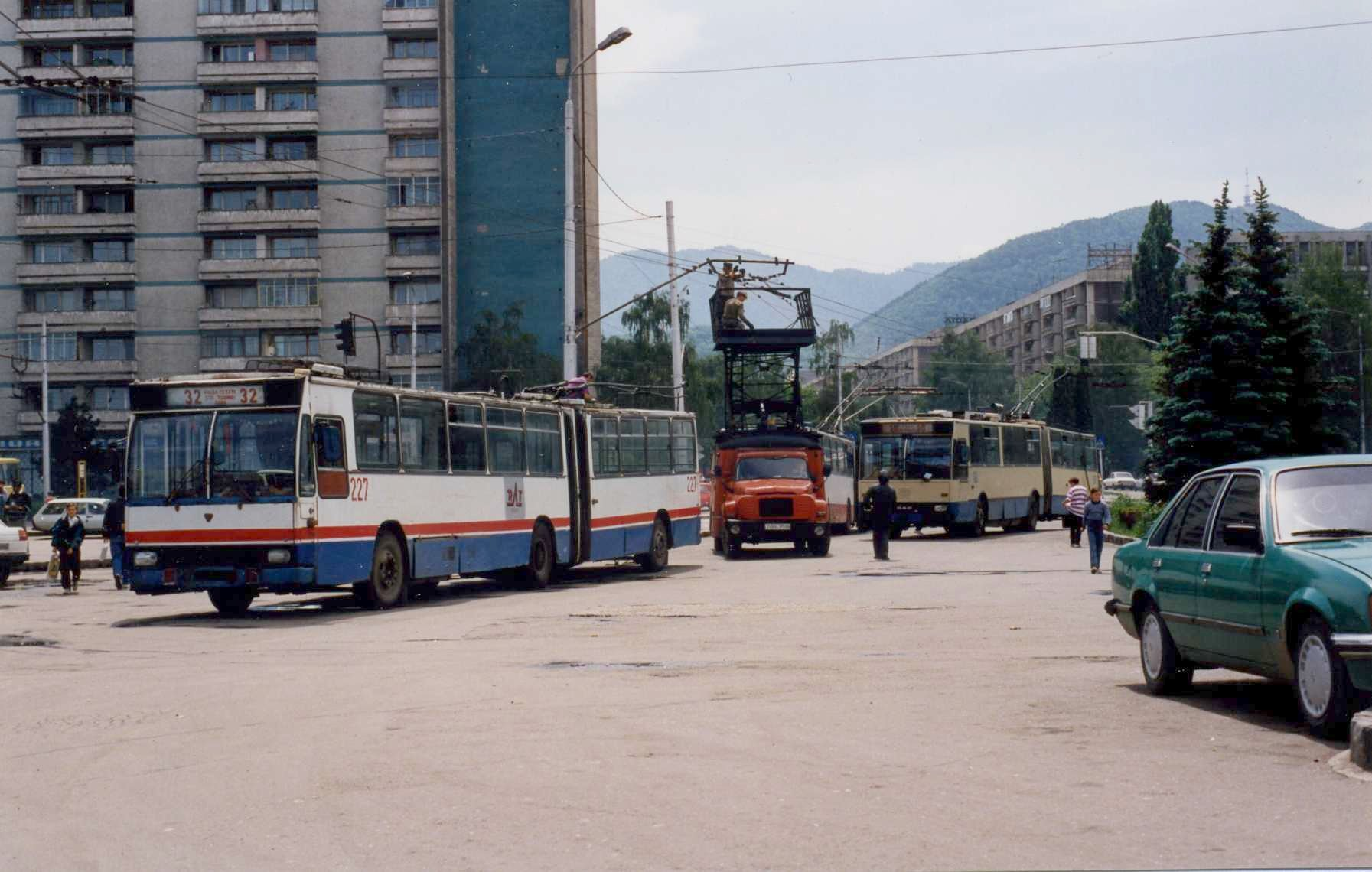
Rocar 117E and 217E in Brasov, Romania, 1994. It was one of the most used trolleybus types in Romania in the 1980s until the 2000s

Company	Country	Notes
4 June Rolling Stock Works	North Korea	
Alfa Romeo	Italy	
Almatyelectrotrans-Service	Kazakhstan	formerly Electromash
Amber	Lithuania	
AM General	United States	
AnsaldoBreda	Italy	formerly Ansaldo Trasporti and Breda Costruzioni Ferroviarie
Aviant Aircraft Factory	Ukraine	
Associated Equipment Company	United Kingdom	
Autodromo	Italy	
Berkhof	Netherlands	known as VDL Berkhof in its final years
Berna	Switzerland	
BredaMenarinibus	Italy	formerly Breda Costruzioni Ferroviarie
British United Traction	United Kingdom	
Brown Boveri & Company	Canada	using GM New Look bus bodies
Busscar	Brazil	
Canadian Car and Foundry	Canada	
Chavdar	Bulgaria	
Crossley Motors	United Kingdom	
Daimler Motor Company	United Kingdom	
Dennis Specialist Vehicles	United Kingdom	
DesignLine	New Zealand	
DINA	Mexico	
ELBO	Greece	
Electric Transit, Inc.	United States	joint venture between Škoda and AAI Corporation
Ekova Electric	Czech Republic	Merged into Škoda Transportation
Fiat	Italy	
Flyer Industries	Canada	became New Flyer Industries
FBW	Switzerland	
Gräf & Stift	Austria	
Guy Motors	United Kingdom	
Henschel	Germany	
Hispano-Suiza	Spain	
Ikarus	Hungary	
J. G. Brill	United States	
Jelcz	Poland	
Kawasaki	Japan	
Lancia	Italy	
Leyland Motors	United Kingdom	
LiAZ	Russia	
LuAZ	Ukraine	
LAZ	Ukraine	
MAN	Germany	
Mafersa	Brazil	
Marmon-Herrington	United States	
Materfer	Argentina	
Menarini	Italy	acquired by Breda in 1989, forming BredaMenarinibus
Mercedes-Benz	Germany	
MASA (Mexicana de Autobuses SA)	Mexico	now part of Volvo
Moscow Trolleybus Plant (MTRZ)	Russia	
NAW	Switzerland	
Neoplan	Germany	
Neoplan USA	United States	
Pegaso	Spain	
PTMZ	Russia	
Praga	Czech Republic	
Pullman-Standard	United States	
Ransomes, Sims & Jefferies	United Kingdom	
Richard Garrett & Sons	United Kingdom	
Rocar	Romania	
Saurer	Switzerland	
Salvador Caetano	Portugal	
St. Louis Car Company	United States	
Scania AB	Sweden	
Socimi	Italy	
Sunbeam	United Kingdom	
Tatra	Czech Republic	
Trolza	Russia	previously ZiU
Tushino Mechanical Plant	Russia	
Twin Coach	United States	
Ursus	Poland	
Valmet	Finland	
Van Hool	Belgium	
Vétra	France	
Viseon Bus	Germany	formerly Neoplan's trolleybus production
Volgograd transport and machinery plant	Russia	
Volvo Buses	Sweden	
Yaroslavl motor plant	Russia	
