= Automotive industry in Ukraine =

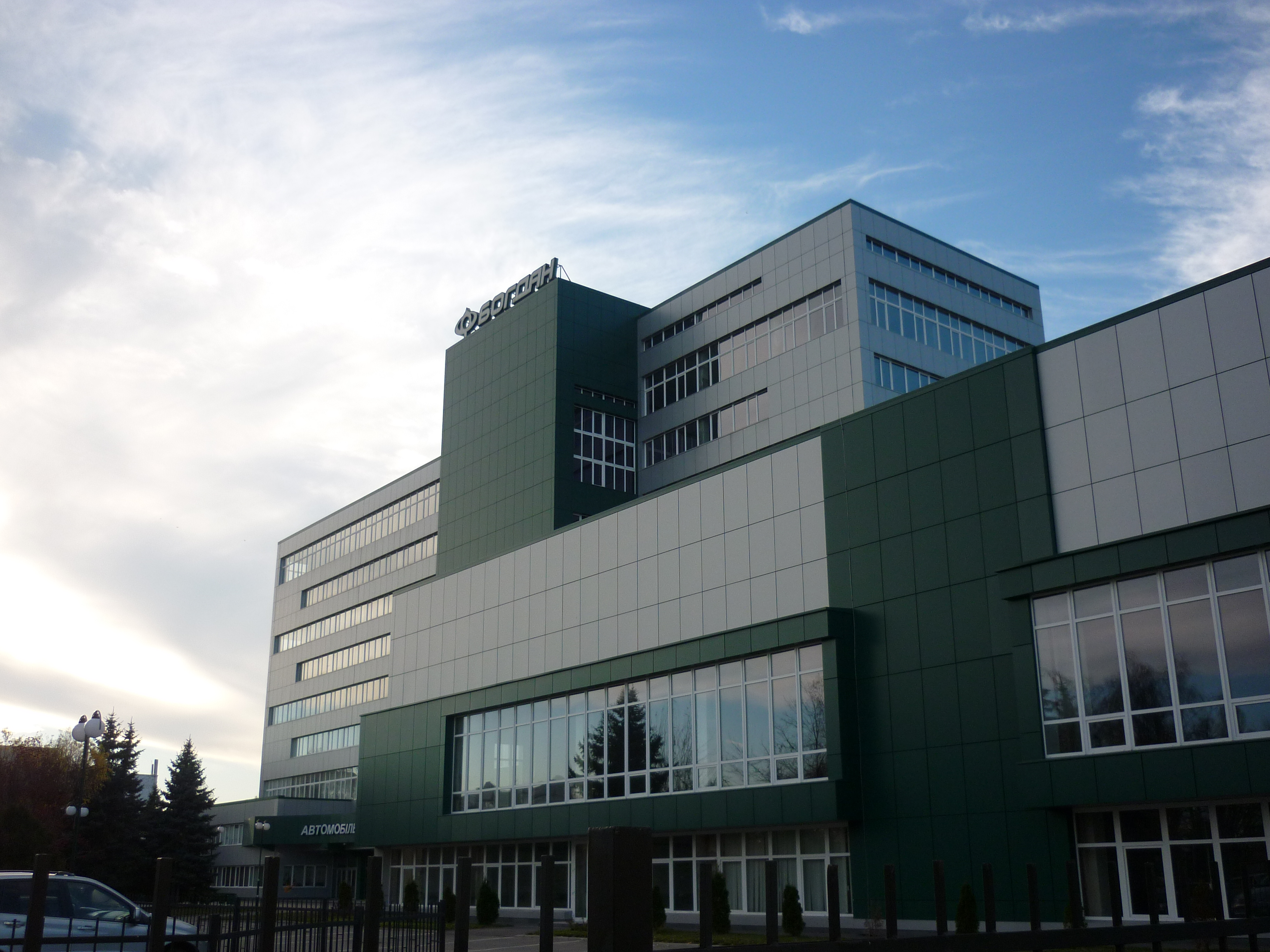
Bogdan factory in Cherkasy

The automotive industry in Ukraine was established during Soviet times and, until the fall of the Soviet Union, was an integral part of the automotive industry of the Soviet Union. The first Ukrainian motor vehicle brands were established in the late 1950s.

The Ukrainian SSR was the only Soviet republic other than Russia manufacturing various types of automobiles and automotive parts with a former annual output of more than 200,000 units.

Before agreement with the EU, Ukraine's automobile manufacturers made between 100 and 200 thousand vehicles per year. The major domestic players in this industry were UkrAvto (ZAZ), Bogdan, Eurocar, Electron corporation, Etalon-Avto, KrAZ and LAZ. Locally developed designs continue to prevail in the production of trucks, buses and trolleybuses while production of domestically designed cars such as ZAZ Tavria has decreased. Most car production in Ukraine now involves assembly of European, Korean and Chinese brands.

In April 2018 the Ukrainian carmakers association UkrAutoProm stated that the automotive industry in Ukraine worked at only 2% of their capacity, while the output of motor vehicles was nearly 98% less than that in March 2008.

== Brand ==

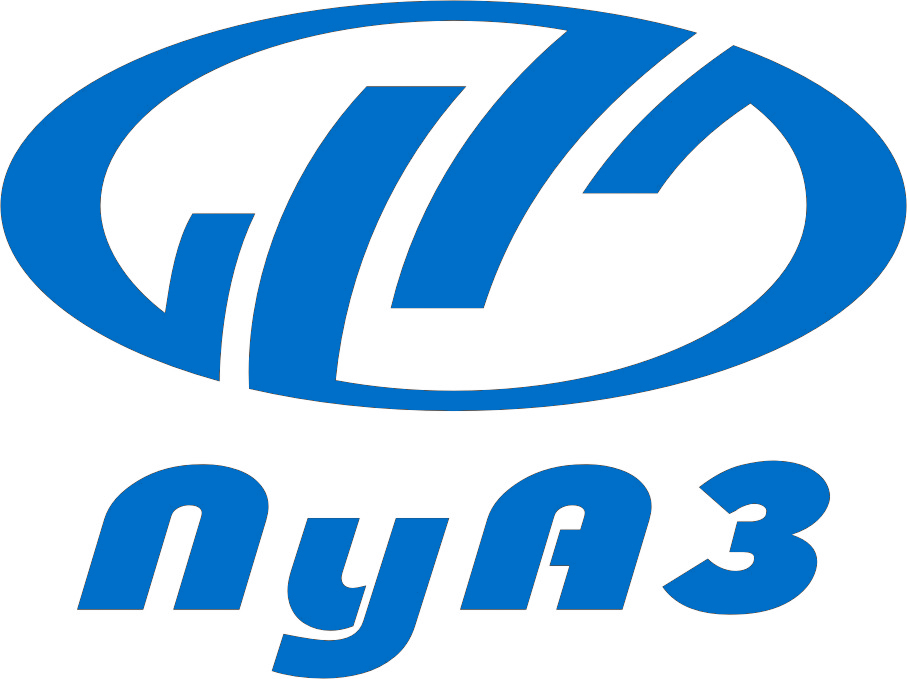

== History ==
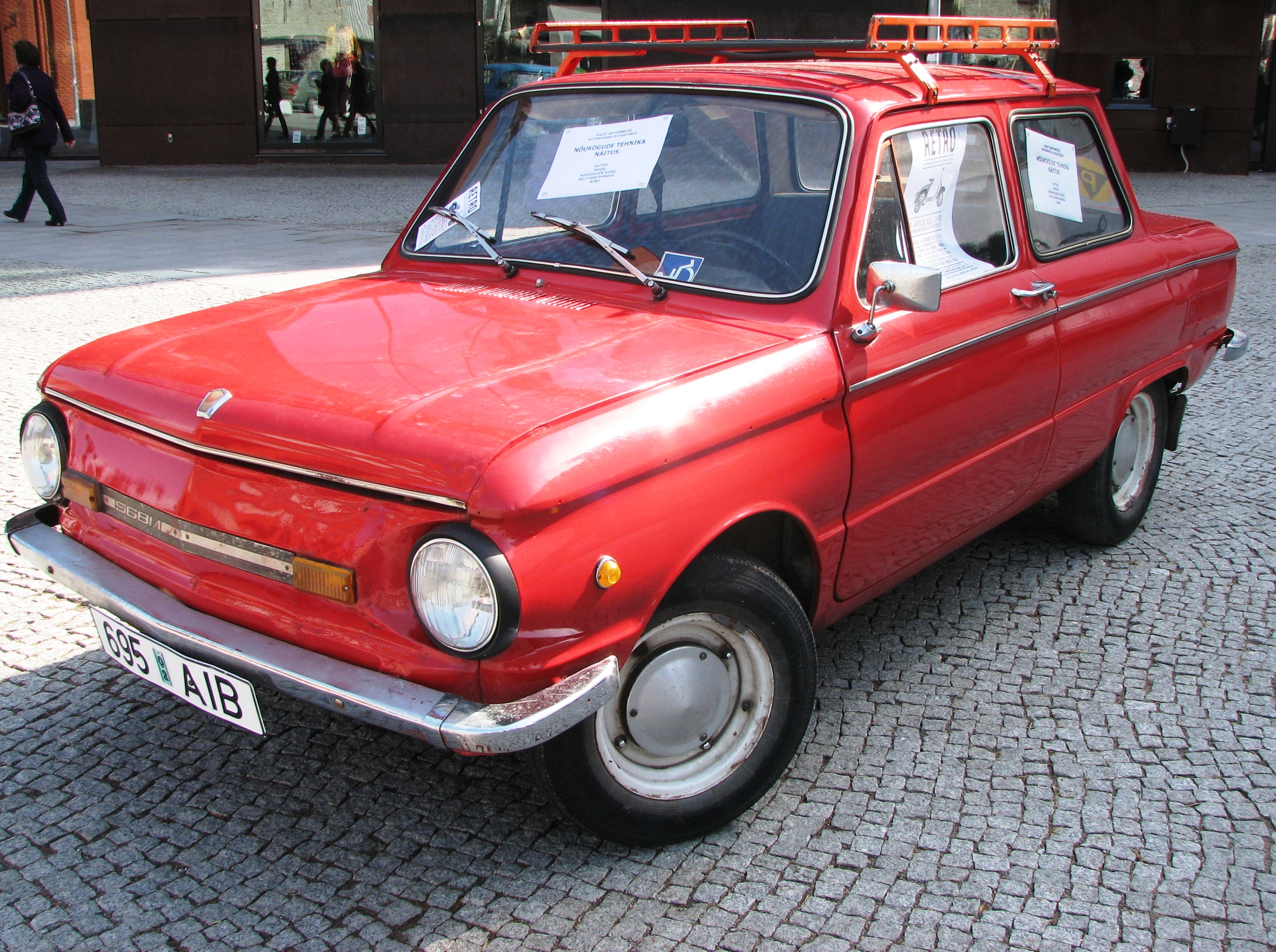
ZAZ-968M Zaporozhets (1980-1994)

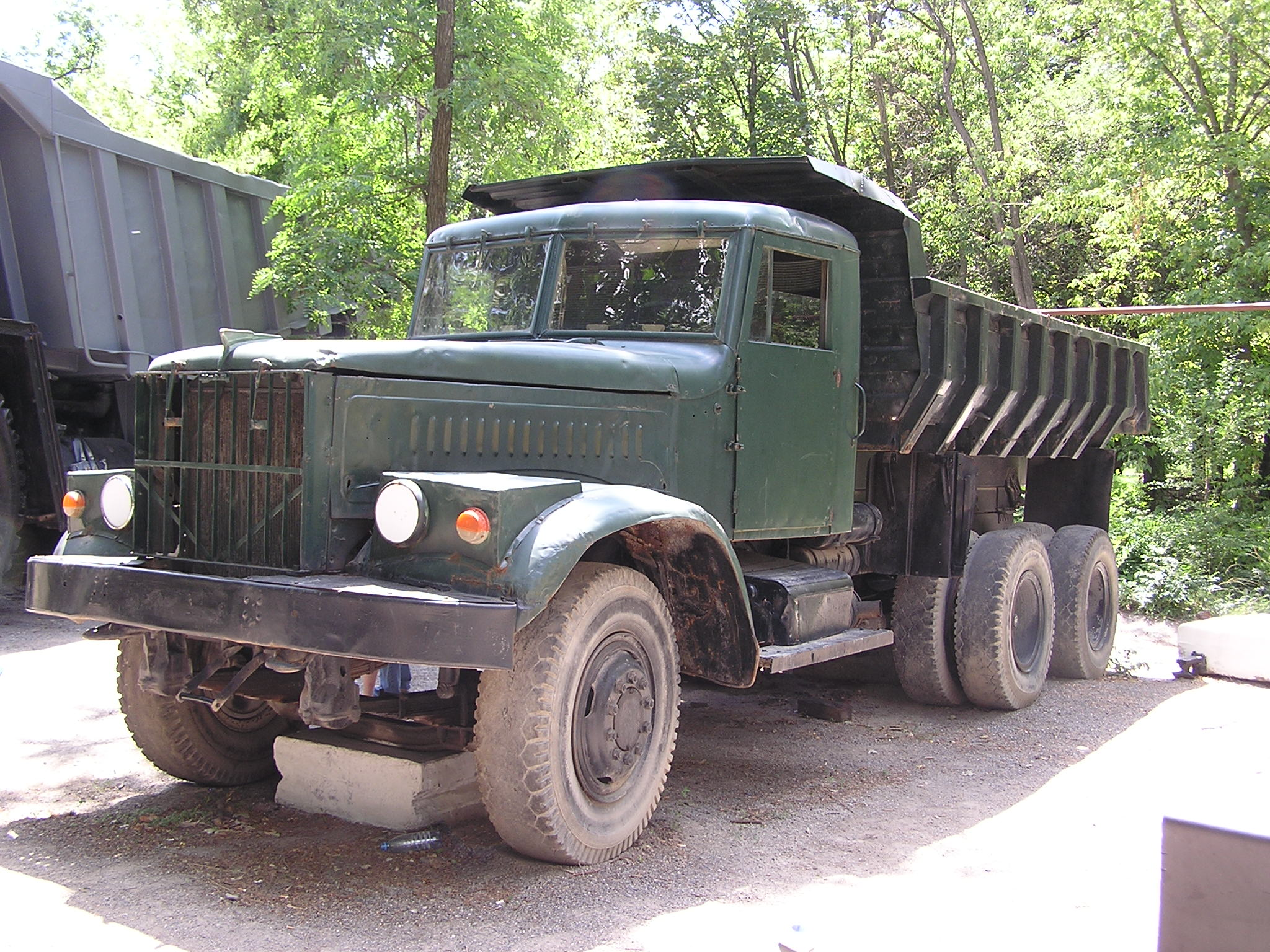
KrAZ-256B (1966-1994)

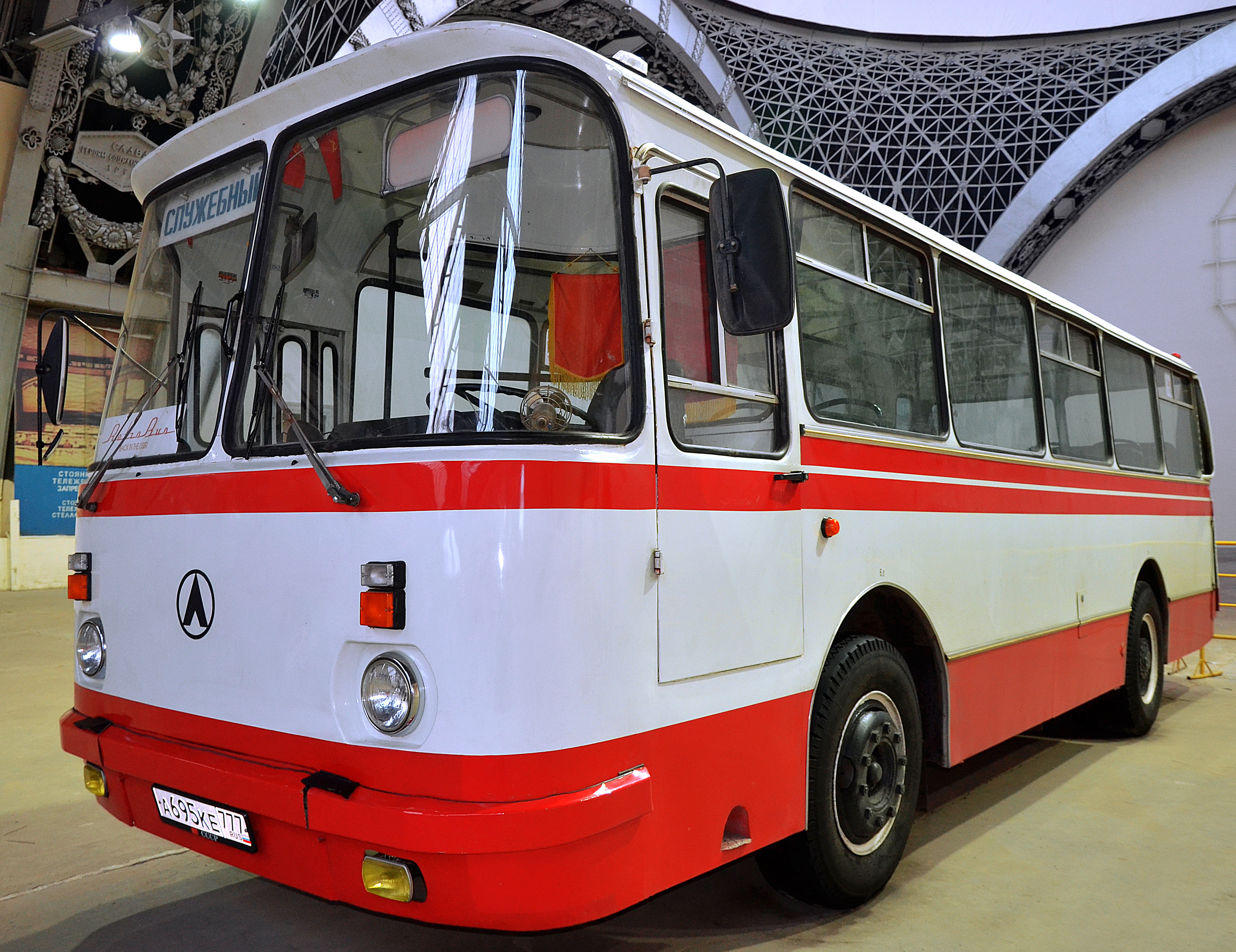
LAZ-695N Lviv (1976-2002)

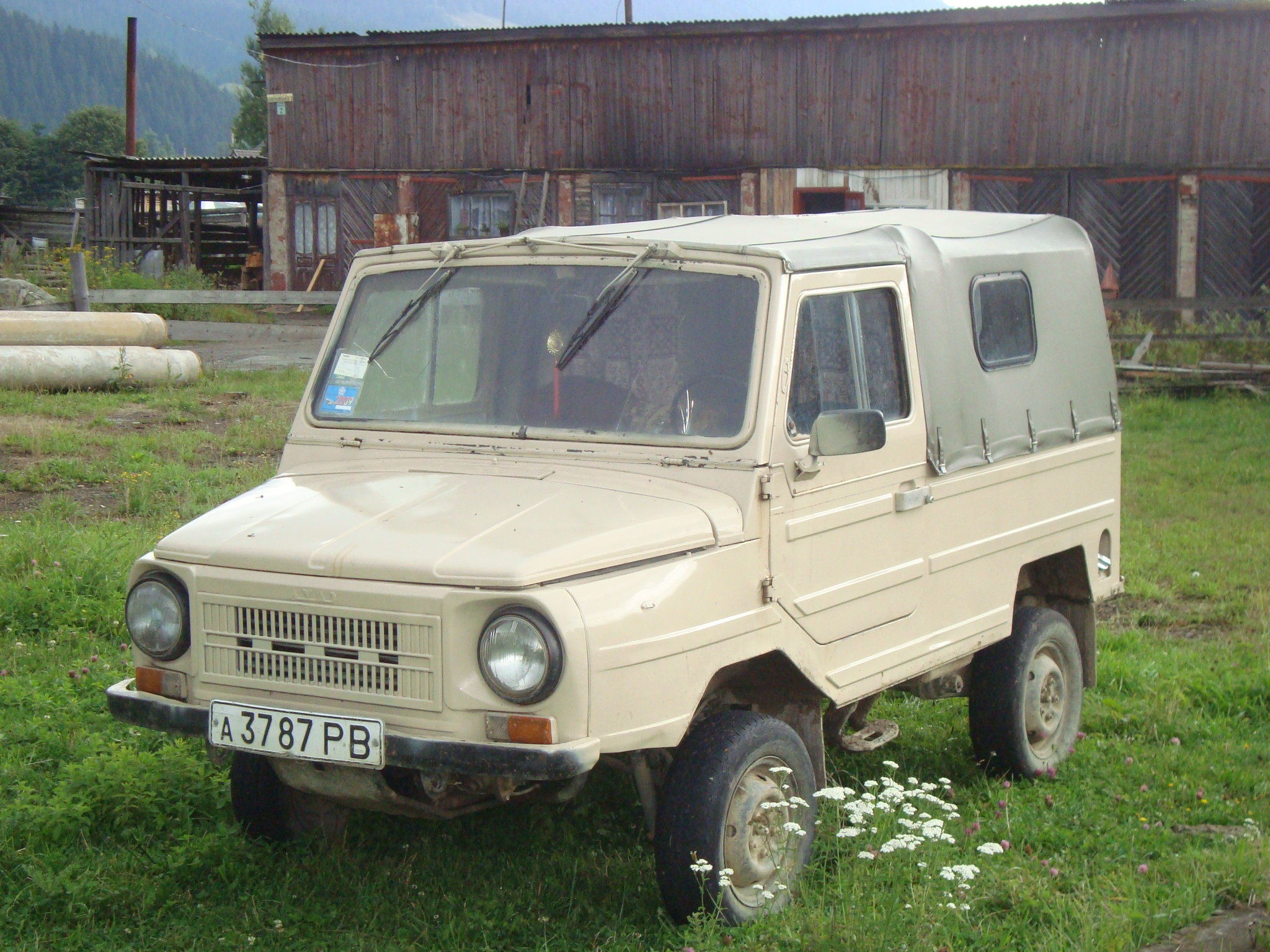
LuAZ-969M Volyn (1979-1992)

Ukrainian SSR was second Soviet republic with annual production at more than 200,000 units per year.

By the early 1980s, Soviet automobile industry consisted of several main plants, which produced vehicles for various market segments.

Main factories in Ukrainian SSR were ZAZ (passenger cars), LuAZ (small off-road vehicles), LAZ (buses) and KrAZ (trucks).

ZAZ factory was founded in 1923. The first ZAZ-965 Zaporozhets entered production 25 October 1960.

ZAZ Zaporozhets was a series of rear-wheel-drive superminis (city cars in their first generation) designed and built from 1958 at the ZAZ factory in Soviet Ukraine. Different models of the Zaporozhets, all of which had an air-cooled engine in the rear, were produced until 1994. Since the late 1980s, the final series, 968M, was replaced by the cardinally different ZAZ-1102 Tavria hatchback, which featured a front-wheel drive and a more powerful water-cooled engine.

In 1985 ZAZ manufactured 160,000 cars.

KrAZ was founded on August 31, 1945. In 1958 first KrAZ-222 Dnipro was manufactured.

KrAZ-255 is an off-road truck 6x6 for extreme operations.

Variants include:

- KrAZ-255B
- KrAZ-255B1
- KrAZ-255V
- KrAZ-255L
- KrAZ-256

In 1986 KrAZ manufactured 30,655 trucks.

LAZ was founded on May 21, 1945. In 1956 factory started mass production of LAZ-695 Lviv.

LAZ-695 Lviv — Soviet and Ukrainian middle class city bus produced by LAZ.

LAZ-695 was the first bus produced at Lviv Bus Factory in 1945. In 1949 the factory started to produce automobile wagons, trailers, auto-cranes and (experimental release) electromobiles. The initiative to develop and produce a new model of bus was supported by the government, and European samples of modern buses were brought to the LAZ factory. The models brought included Magirus, Neoplan, and Mercedes. The first bus engineered by Lviv Bus Factory was done in the year of 1955. The bus model underwent various modifications, but the major body composition and equipment remained the same. The most significant change from the first generation to the second (695/695Б/695Е/695Zh) was the front and rear modification.

The rear changes to the second generation 695M added a turbine air intake system with two vents in the roof, and the third generation 695Н/695НГ/695Д modernized the front end. Other variations between the generations include aesthetical changes, such as manufacturing emblems and headlight placement. The model was not faultless, (tight passenger space and frequent engine overheating in 2nd and 3rd generation models), the bus was characterized by simple construction and easy accessibility to all types of roads in Russia and CIS.

In 1988 LAZ manufactured 14,646 buses.

LuAZ was founded as Lutsk Repair Plant on September 25, 1955. First LuAZ-967 was manufactured in 1961.

LuAZ-967 was the Transporter of the Front Line, a small Soviet four-wheel drive amphibious vehicle. Light enough to be air transportable, it had a 400 kg payload over most terrain.

It was produced between 1961 and 1975 and was succeeded by the LuAZ-969В, LuAZ-969, LuAZ-969М and the LuAZ-1302.

In 1990 LuAZ manufactured 16,500 off-road vehicles.

The Ukrainian carmakers association UkrAutoProm stated in April 2018 that the automotive industry in Ukraine worked at only 2% of their capacity and that the output of motor vehicles was nearly 98% less than in March 2008.

== Automobile manufacturers ==
=== Bogdan ===
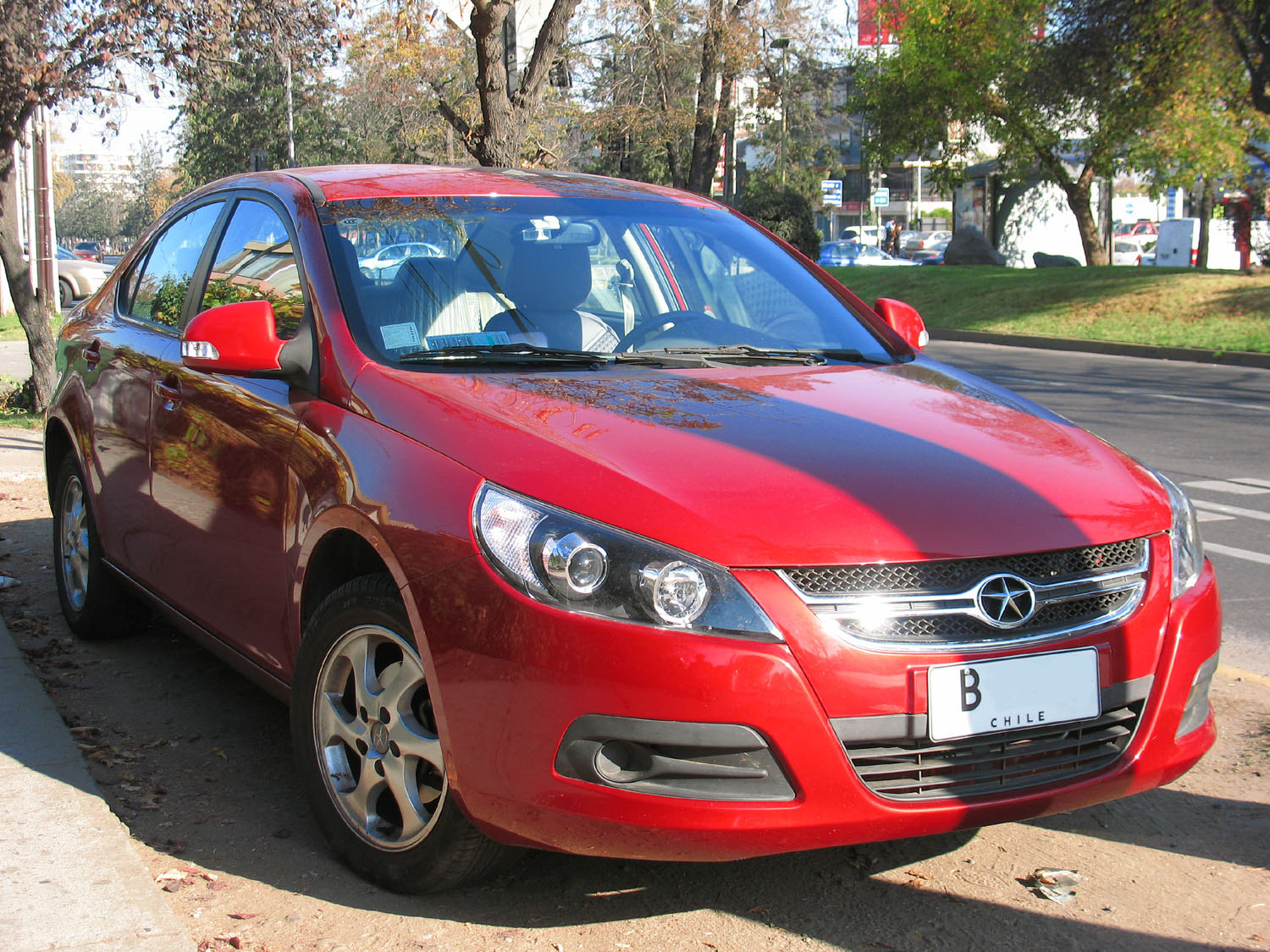
JAC J5

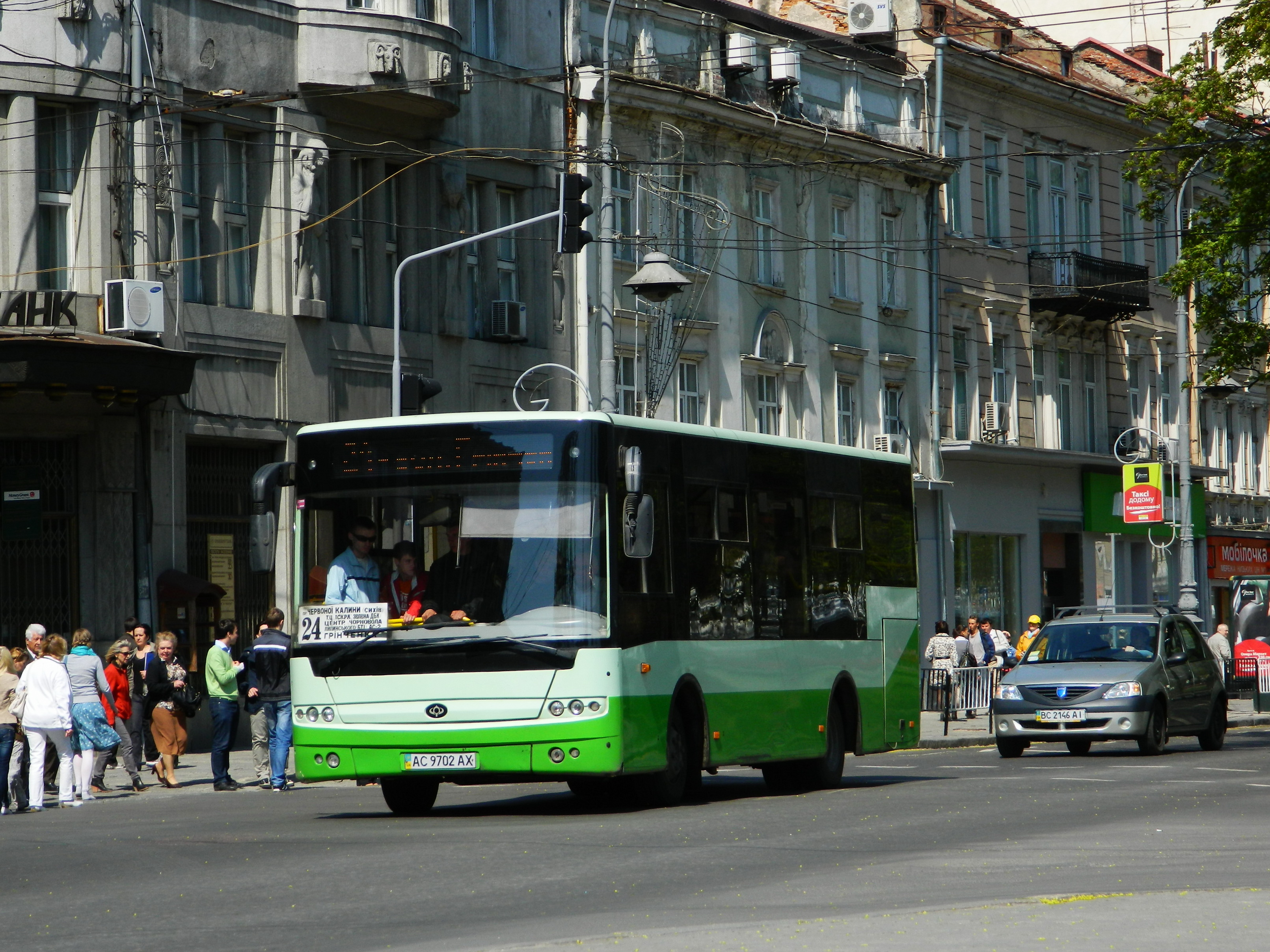
Bogdan A092.80 Bus

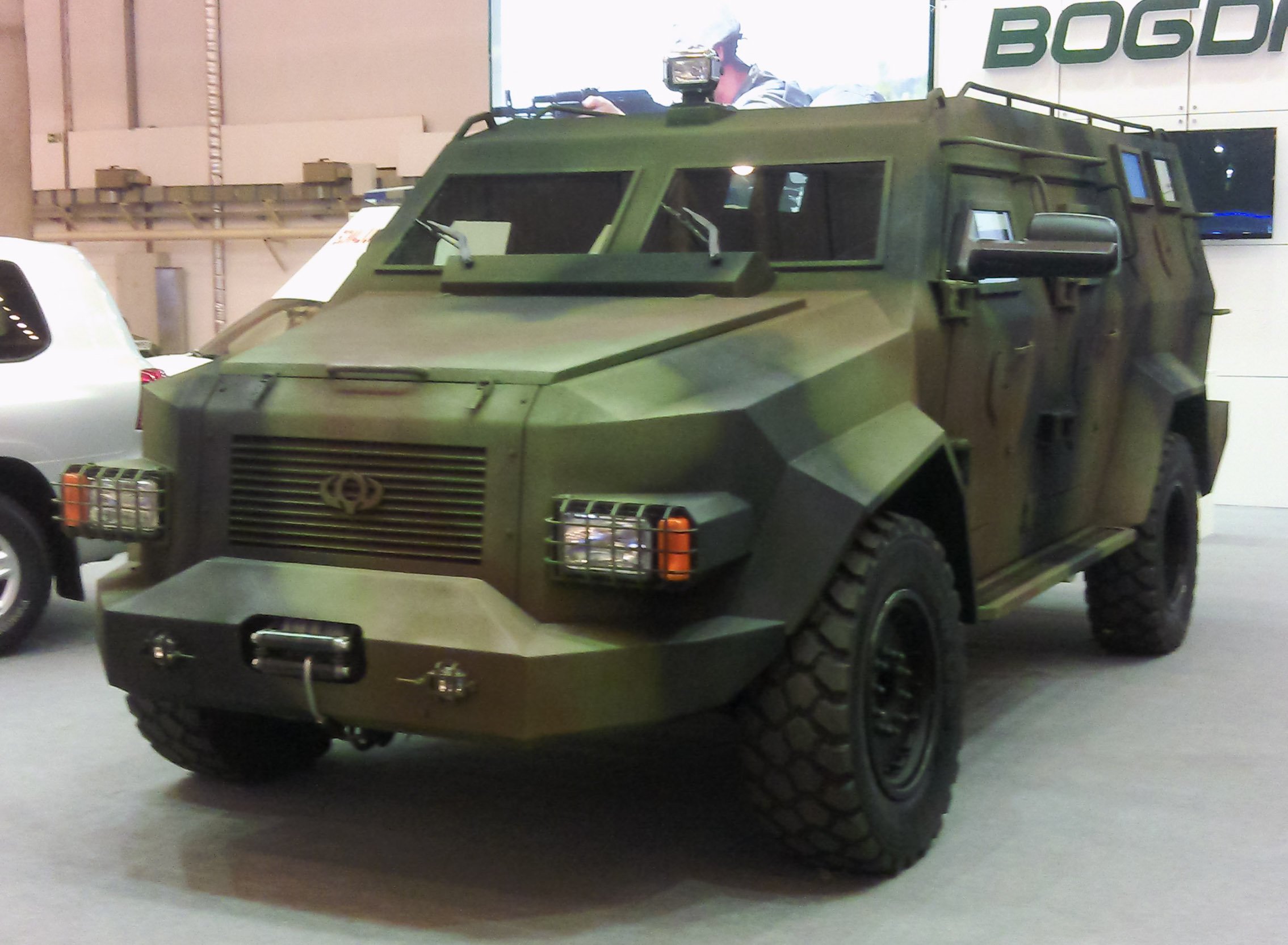
Bogdan Bars-8

Bogdan Corporation is a leading Ukrainian automobile-manufacturing group, including several car- and bus-makers in the country. Its most popular model is the Bogdan Isuzu-powered light bus made in Cherkasy.

The facilities of Bogdan Corporation are able to produce 120 000 to 150 000 cars, up to 9 000 buses and trolleybuses of all types, and around 15 000 cargo trucks and units of specialized equipment a year. Facilities are located in Lutsk and Cherkasy.

The group was controlled by politician Petro Poroshenko; who sold his share in 2009 in connection with the collapse of its production after the 2008 financial crisis.

Cars and trucks are produced or assembled in Cherkasy. The facilities in Cherkasy are the most modern auto-manufacturing facilities in Ukraine. Car manufacturing launched in 2000. The Cherkasy plant can produce 120 000 to 150 000 cars per year. The plant assembled Bogdan 2110, Bogdan 2111, Bogdan 2310 (pick-up) from 2009 to 2014. At the same time Bogdan started assembly of Hyundai Accent, Hyundai Tucson and Hyundai Elantra XD. In 2013 Bogdan and JAC Motors has launched CKD assembly of the JAC J5 sedan in Ukraine.

Buses are mostly produced in Cherkasy while trolleybuses are manufactured in Lutsk. The bus "Bogdan" is the most widely used small bus for city transportation in Ukrainian cities. The facilities located in Cherkasy can produce up to 3000 buses a year along with car and truck production. The plant in Lutsk formerly known as LuAZ now manufactures buses and trolleybuses branded as "Bogdan". Maximum capacity of Lutsk plant is 8000 buses and trolleybuses a year.

Bogdan Corporation was created in 1992, after the fall of the Soviet Union, by the mergers of some former Soviet enterprises to implement big investment projects dedicated to creating strong and powerful manufacturing of different-type vehicles in Ukraine. Initially, the company was a distributor of various Russian-based vehicles, later selling vehicles by Korean manufacturer, Kia Motors. In 1998, the company obtained the Cherkasy automobile repair factory that was specializing in repairing buses of the Russian-based PAZ and GAZ GAZelle. In 1999, the factory was transformed into the "Cherkasy Autobus" that began manufacturing its own buses, Bogdan. That same year, the company signed another contract with Hyundai for distribution of their vehicles. In 2000, the company bought the bankrupted Soviet LuAZ based in Lutsk (Volyn Oblast), and during the same period, started to produce its own cars based on the Russian AvtoVAZ. In 2003, the company's began exporting the buses. In 2004, the company signed a general agreement with Isuzu to use the Isuzu brand on the company's exported buses. In 2005, the company Bogdan Motors became a corporation.

In 2000, the company bought out the bankrupt Soviet LuAZ based in Lutsk (Volyn Oblast) and shortly thereafter started to make its own cars based on the Russian AvtoVAZ. In 2003, the company's began exporting the buses. In 2004, the company signed a general agreement with Isuzu to use the Isuzu brand on the company's exported buses. In 2005, the company Bogdan Motors became a corporation.

In 2013 Chinese carmaker Anhui Jianghuai Automobile (JAC Motors) has launched CKD assembly of the J5 sedan in Ukraine.

In 2014 the company developed the 'Bars' (panther) multifunctional light armored vehicle to be used by the National Guard of Ukraine.

Bogdan Bars-8 is based on Dodge Ram chassis.

=== Electron Corporation ===
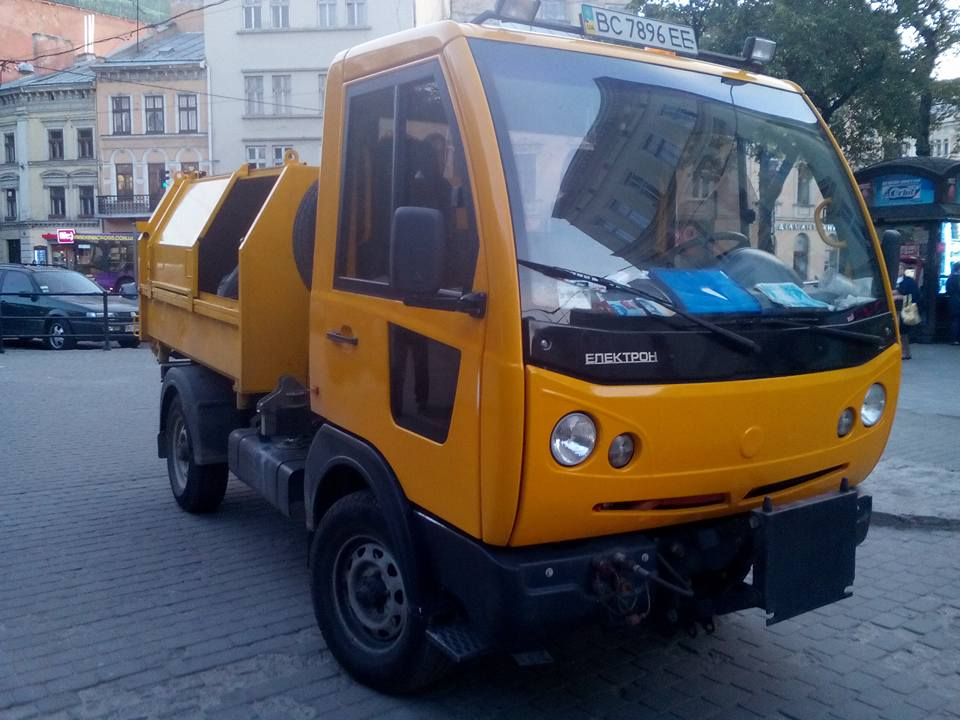
Electron EM-C320.12

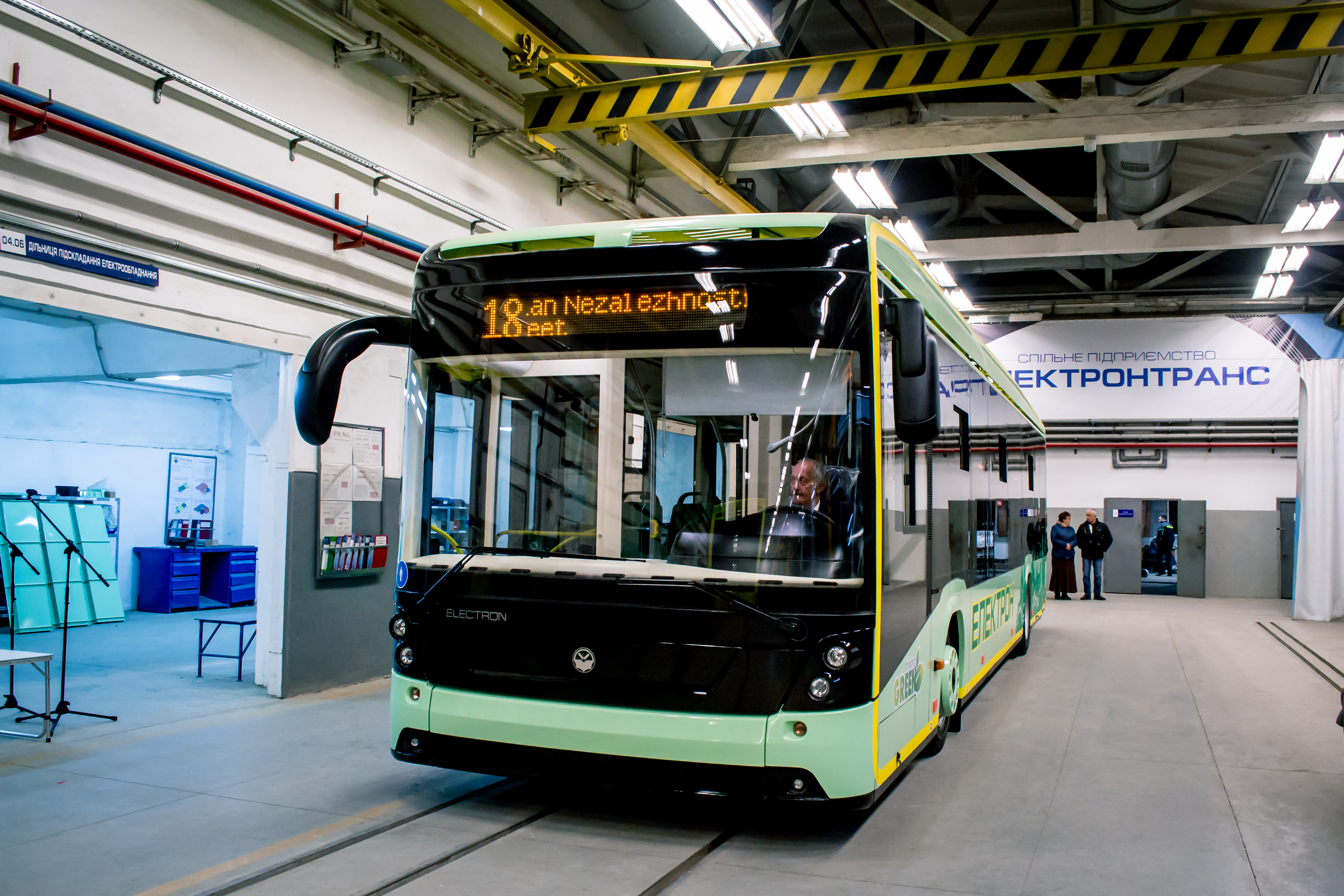
Electron E19101 electro bus

ElectronMash plant is an up-to-date enterprise of Electron corporation, which specializes on production of special off-road all-wheel drive vehicles – trucks of multifunctional purpose, used in public services, and ambulances.

Considering the best foreign experience, low-cargo trucks of multifunctional purpose, unique in the countries of CIS, were worked out by the designers of the enterprise. For the first time the project of the truck was presented on the X International economical Forum Transboarder cooperation in October 2010 and received a high appraisal of specialists, in 2012 the first public truck was produced by newly founded ElectronMash enterprise. Implementation of the project and production of Electron vehicles were realized at its own expense and on the Electron corporation production areas.

The production of ElectronMash enterprise is maneuverable small public trucks Electron with changeable kits of attachments intended for keeping improvement facilities in a proper sanitary condition, carrying out different kinds of municipal services in the streets, pavements, parks and territories around the buildings. The users of ElectronMash production are also industrial enterprises, road organizations, keepers of other urban and industrial infrastructure.

The first Electron vehicles of multifunctional purpose were purchased by the largest hydrogenation Ukrainian company – Ukrhydroenergo, in Ukraine they are successfully used when servicing the territories of big hydroelectric power plants. Among the towns of Ukraine the first consumers of the vehicles of our production were Lviv municipal services.

ElectronMash enterprise designs and produces ambulances of A1, A2, and B types, completed with necessary equipment and devices. The main advantage of the vehicles over existing park of ambulances is that they are of-road all-wheel drive vehicles of hyper cross-country ability with diesel engines, intended for work of urgent and disaster medicine in difficult road conditions and in places difficult of access, namely, in mountain and village areas.

Joint Ukrainian-German venture LLC Electrontrans was founded in 2011 by Electron corporation, TransTec F&E Vetschau UG company (Germany) and Avtotekhnoproekt LLC.

Electrontrans is an enterprise of a full-scale production, specializing in design and production of modern urban electric transport – trams, trolleybuses, electric buses, units and spare parts.

The structure of the enterprise includes design and technological bureau, mechanical and blanking, welding, painting and assembly productions.

Electrontrans production capacity allows to produce 100 trams or 100 trolleybuses / electric buses a year.

Within machine building Electron corporation an extensive program of localization (import substitution) of units and assemblies production for electric transport is realized.

Electrontrans carries out stage-by-stage launching of production of tram bogies, traction equipment control systems for tram, trolleybus and electric bus, coupler drawbars for trams and two – sectional trolleybuses and buses, independent front suspensions and other units and assemblies.

=== Etalon-Auto ===
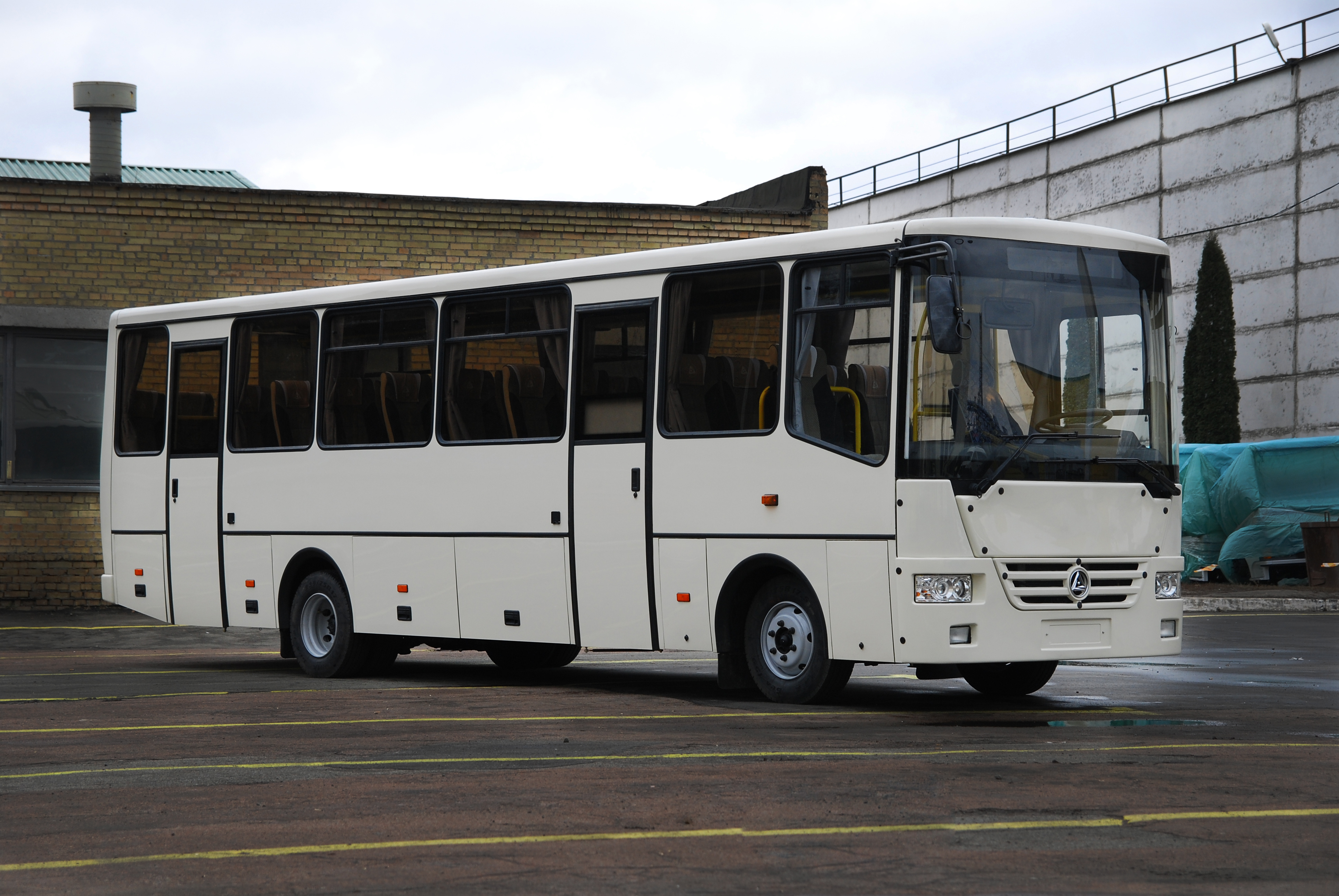
BAZ-A081 Troyanda

Etalon-Auto Corporation has 1 facility in Chernihiv (ChAZ). The plants in Lviv (HalAZ) & Boryspil (BAZ) is now bankrupt.

PJSC Chernihivskyi Automobile Plant is a private (closed) Ukrainian manufacturer of buses and trolleybuses located in Chernihiv.

The plant was founded in 2003 in at the plant of "ChernihivAvtoDetal" (Chernihiv factory driveshafts), which in addition to the principal product from the late 1990s was one of the largest collector car Gorky Automobile Plant in Ukraine. Part of the corporation Corporation Etalon. Manufacturing driveshafts also been retained by the reorganized company, dubbed LLC "Ukrainian gimbal". In 2003, with the first came off the assembly line buses BAZ 2215 "Dolphin". With increasing demands on the buses BAZ A079, part of the production was moved to Chernihiv from Boryspil Automobile, also included in the corporation. In 2007 have been put on the conveyor new bus BAZ A074 chassis FAW. In 2008 at the factory started production of buses BAZ A083, and 2011 - bus BAZ A081.

Also in 2011 at the plant was introduced "Belkommunmash" trolley BCM 321, which is August 24, 2011, runs on Chernihiv trolleybus route number 4.

=== Eurocar ===
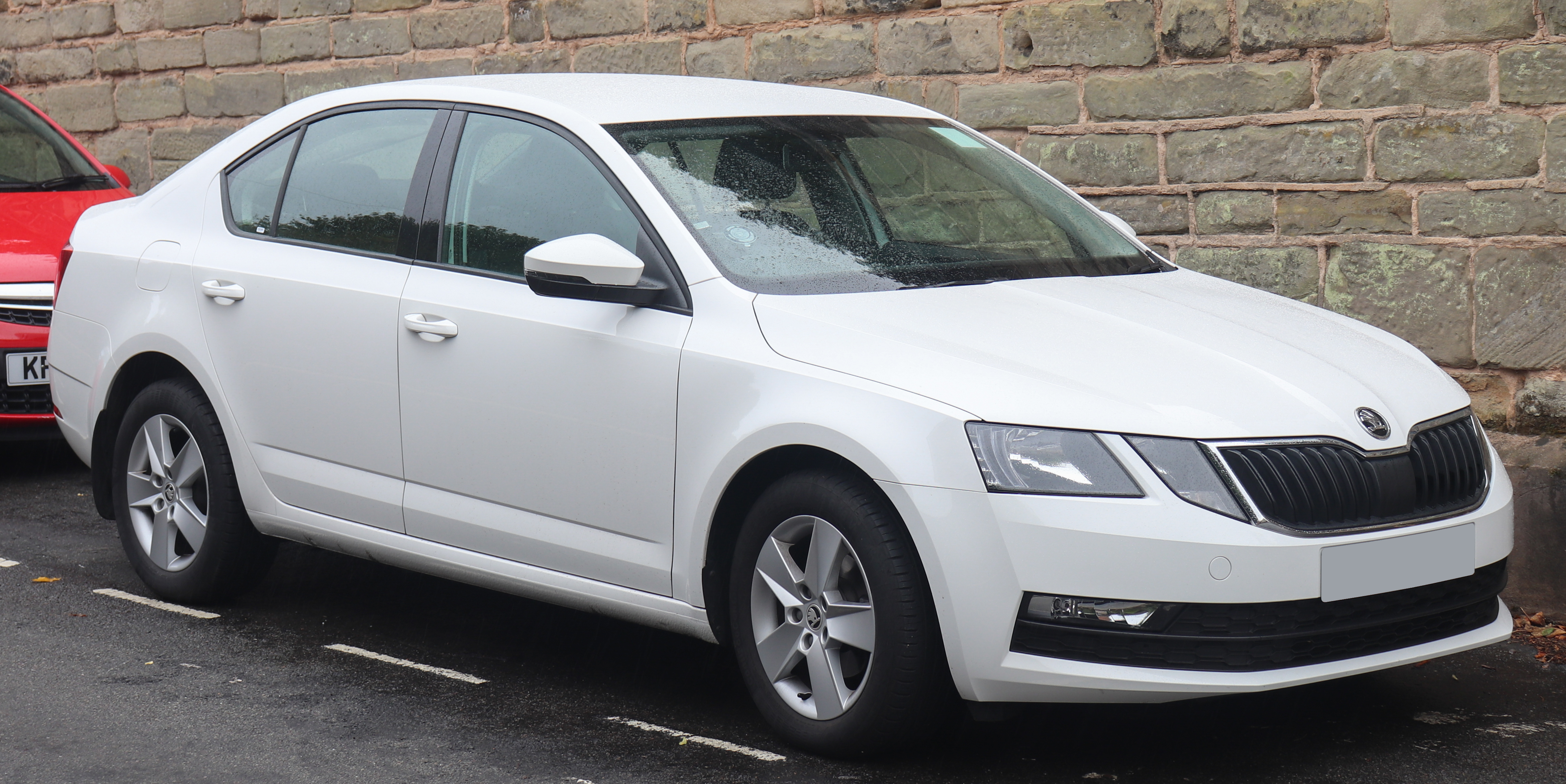
Skoda Octavia

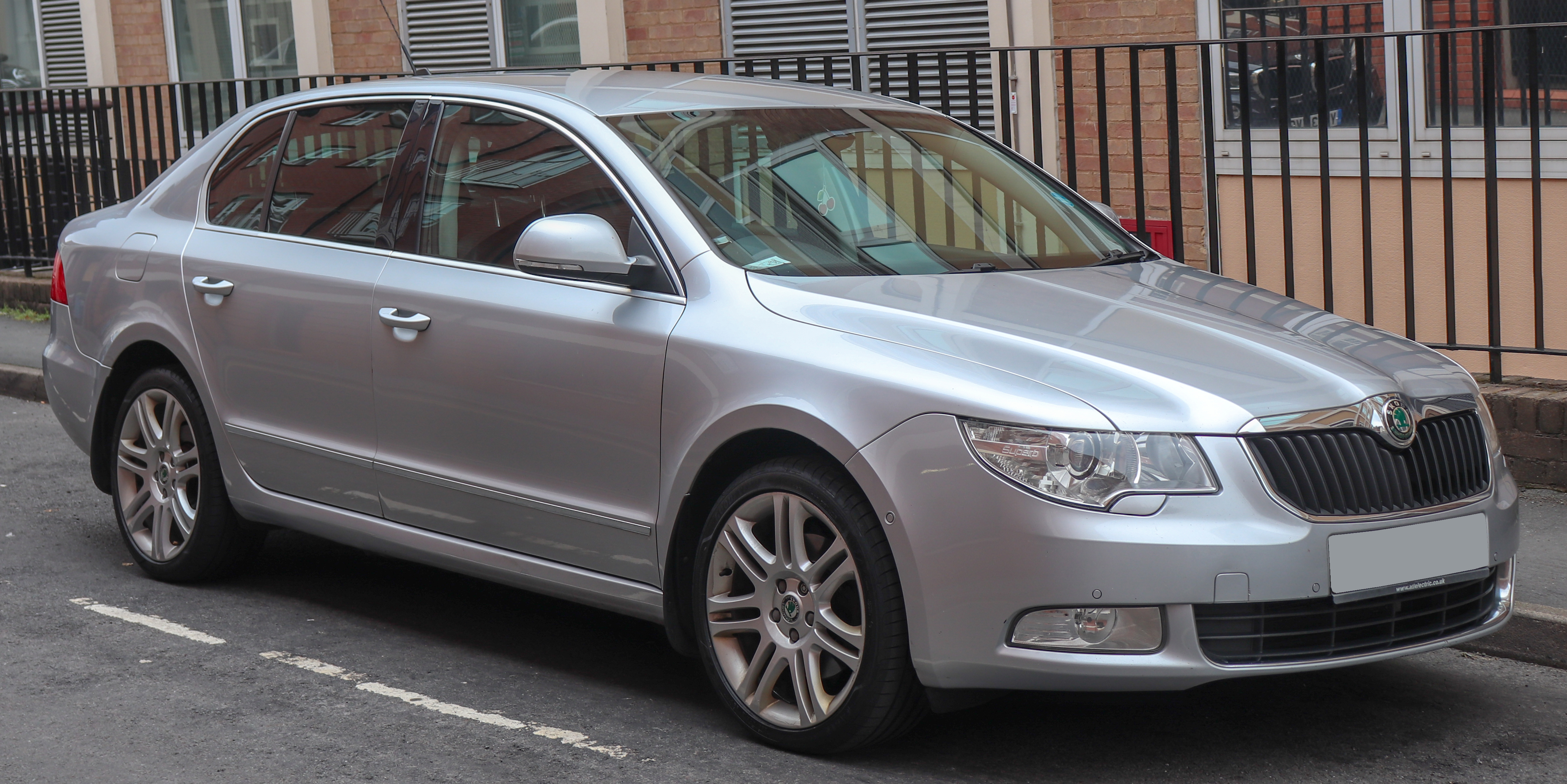
Skoda Superb

PJSC Eurocar is a car manufacturer situated in Solomonovo village, Zakarpattia oblast. The territory of the location of Eurocar plant borders with Slovakia and Hungary. Construction began on July 23, 2001, since then the company has been constantly implementing innovative and investment activity. On December 19, 2011, Eurocar celebrated the tenth anniversary of industrial activity since the technical commissioning of the plant in 2001. Total investment in the project Eurocar is US$250 million. The company is a member of Atoll Holding Group.

Since the start of its activity the Eurocar plant has been implementing a strategy of annual increases in production and the expansion of its product range. In May 2006 the second part of the project to produce complete cars was officially opened. This production, in which the assembly of cars carried on a conveyor line using a process similar to Skoda Auto. In 2008 the third part of the project was launched. In September 2009, PJSC Eurocar completed construction of the building of welding and painting workshops. In December 2011 the next phase was completed, it also was approved by the Ministry of Industrial Policy and the Ministry of Economy of Ukraine program to create production capacity and jobs. A program of production welding in the Eurocar plant produced a pilot batch of bodies. On December 7, 2011, successful launch of the new paint and finishing line took place. Welding and painting were carried out using equipment supplied by Transsystem (Poland), Chropynska Strojirna (Czech Republic), and EISENMANN (Germany). The manufacturing process uses the most modern approaches, European technology, high automated robotic systems, the system "vario shuttle", and the high-tech geometric station AUDI Framer.

The enlarged capacity of the Eurocar plant is full of number of technological innovations, with a flexible production process, well suited to the conditions in Ukraine. Currently the Eurocar plant produces a complete range of Skoda cars.

In 2003 the Eurocar plant was certified to the ISO 9001:2000 international quality management standard. Every year Eurocar maintains this certification. Certification audits are carried out by the Prague representative office of TÜV NORD CERT GmbH (Germany). In 2009 PJSC Eurocar introduced an integrated enterprise management system according to international standards ISO 9001:2008 and OHSAS 18001:2007, and was successfully certified to this standard in October 2009.

From the very beginning company personnel involved directly in the production of vehicles have received specialized training in the Czech Republic from Skoda Auto. In 2008 a teaching unit for training was introduced at the Eurocar plant. The company conducts certification of personnel, employment and working conditions.

=== KrAZ ===
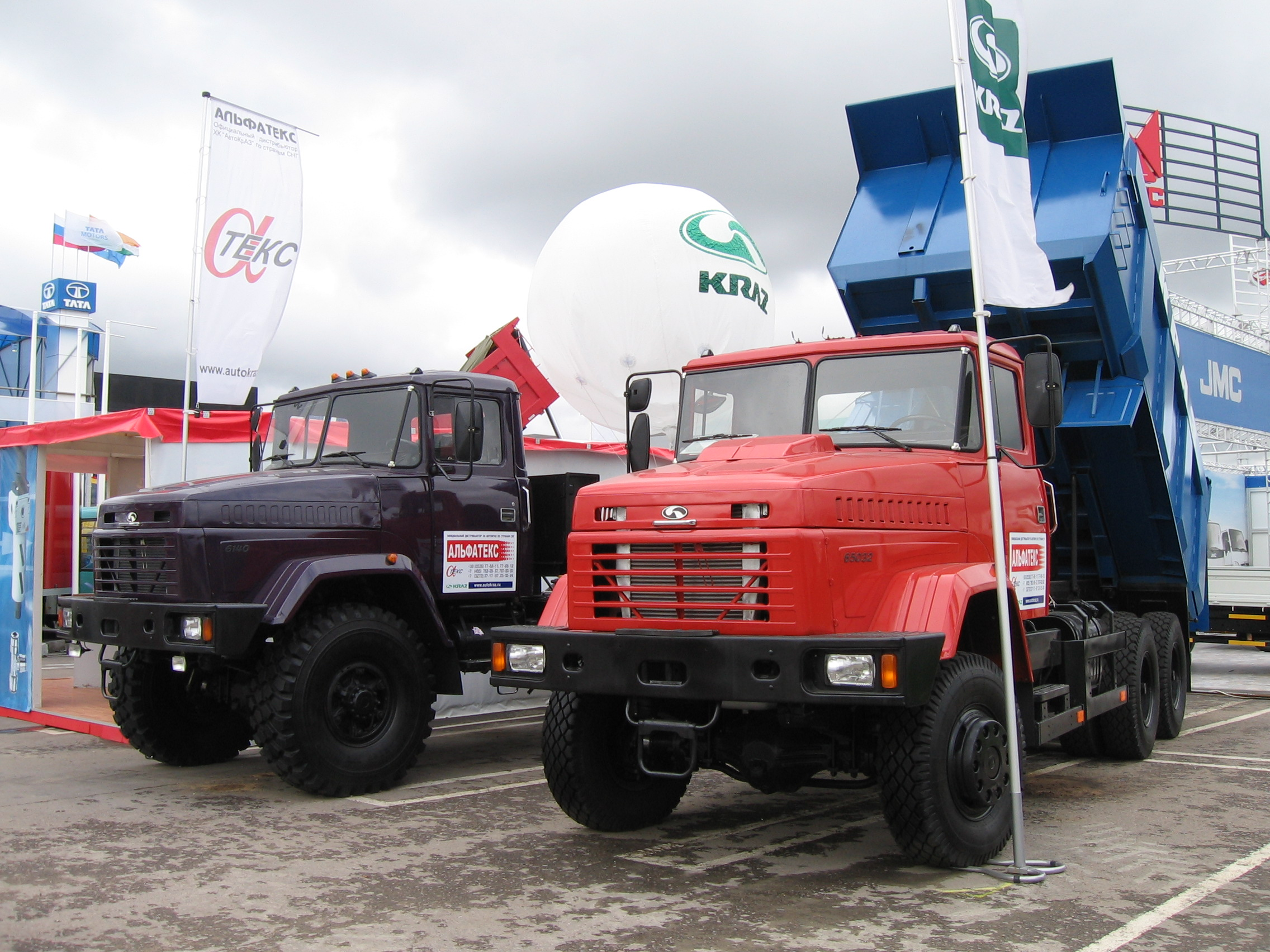
KRAZ trucks

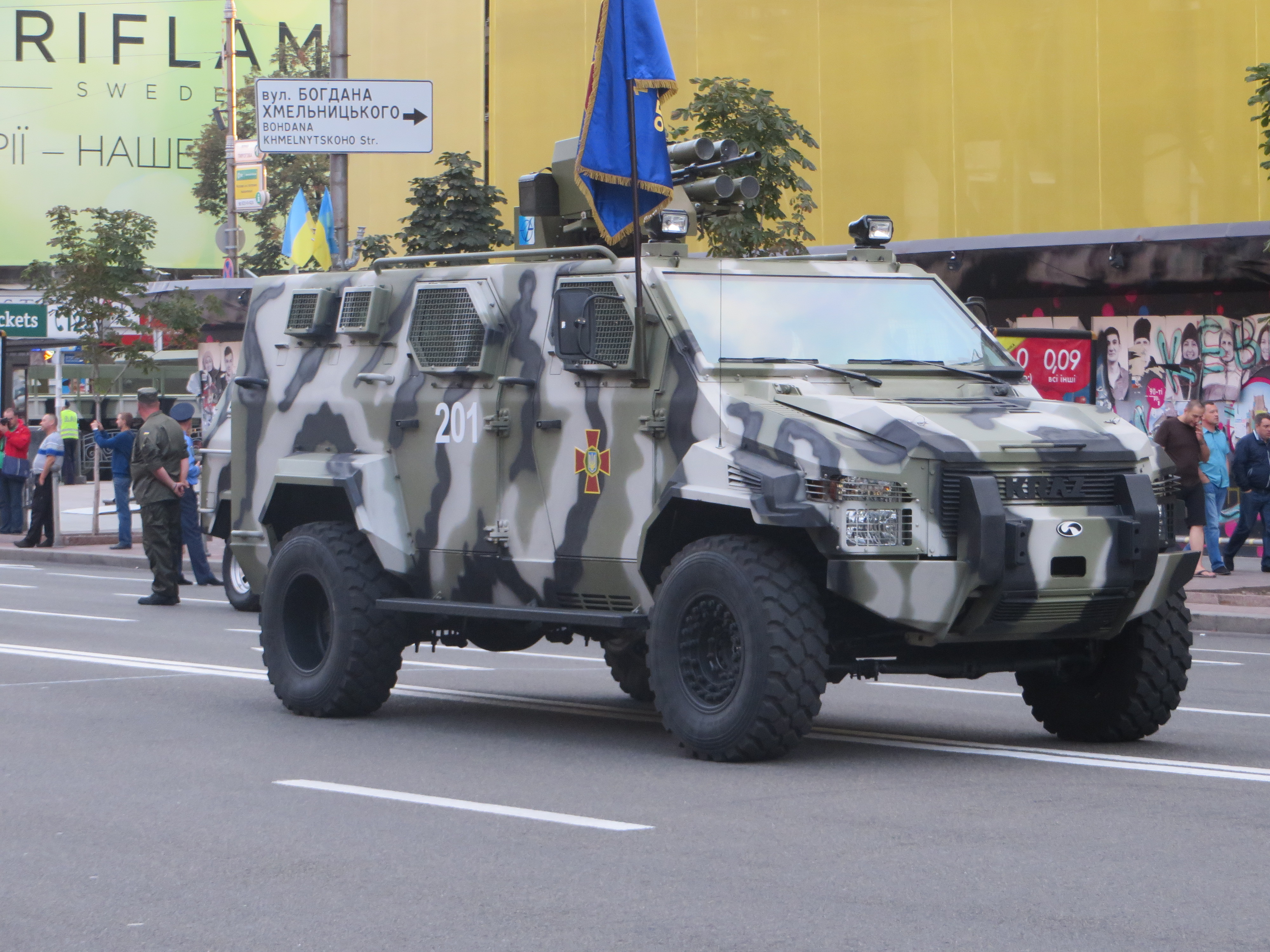
KRAZ Spartan

KRAZ (Kremenchuk Automobile Plant or AvtoKrAZ) is a factory that produces trucks and other special-purpose vehicles in Kremenchuk, Ukraine, particularly heavy-duty off-road models.

On April 17, 1958, the Central Committee of the Communist Party of the Soviet Union ordered the construction of a plant for heavy-duty vehicles production in Kremenchuk. Heavy-duty trucks manufacture was transferred from the Yaroslavl Automobile Plant (today Yaroslavl Motor Plant).

In 1961 the plant delivered for export more than 500 vehicles in 26 countries of the world - Argentina, Afghanistan, Bulgaria, China, India, Vietnam and others.

In 1986 total output was 30 655 KrAZ vehicles - the maximum quantity over the period of its existence.

In 1996 Holding company "AvtoKrAZ" was registered.

In 2004 HC "AvtoKrAZ" signed one of the biggest contracts for delivery of 2200 KrAZ vehicles to Iraq. The ISO 9001:2000 quality control system was introduced at the plant.

In January 2006 the 800,000th truck was assembled at the KrAZ main assembly plant. In October of the same year HC "AvtoKrAZ" won the first prize among 100 Ukrainian companies with the best rate of development according to the net profit growth pursuant to the results of rating "Top 100 Most dynamic companies"

On August 23, 2011, the KrAZ-5233 "Spetsnaz" has entered into service with Ukrainian army.

After the 2008 financial crisis, orders for vehicles declined drastically as Ukraine was severely effected by the event, the factory worked at minimal capacity. However, during the 2014 Russian invasion of Ukraine the government of Ukraine placed large orders for new military vehicles. The Border Guards, National Guard, and Army of Ukraine have all been scheduled to receive new KrAZ armored trucks. Moreover, KrAZ partnered with the Canadian defense firm Streit Group to produce the Cougar and Spartan armored vehicles. A total of 21 Spartans were ordered with the Ministry of Defense having an option for an additional 40, 20 Cougars were also ordered.

Several KrAZ Sprartan's were seen at the Kyiv independence day parade indicating that the order was at least partially complete.

In November 2014 Ukrainian government placed an order for 1200 vehicles and 200 armored personnel carrier to the factory. The contract was worth 1 billion UAH ($64,267,360.00).

=== Lviv Tank Repair Plant ===
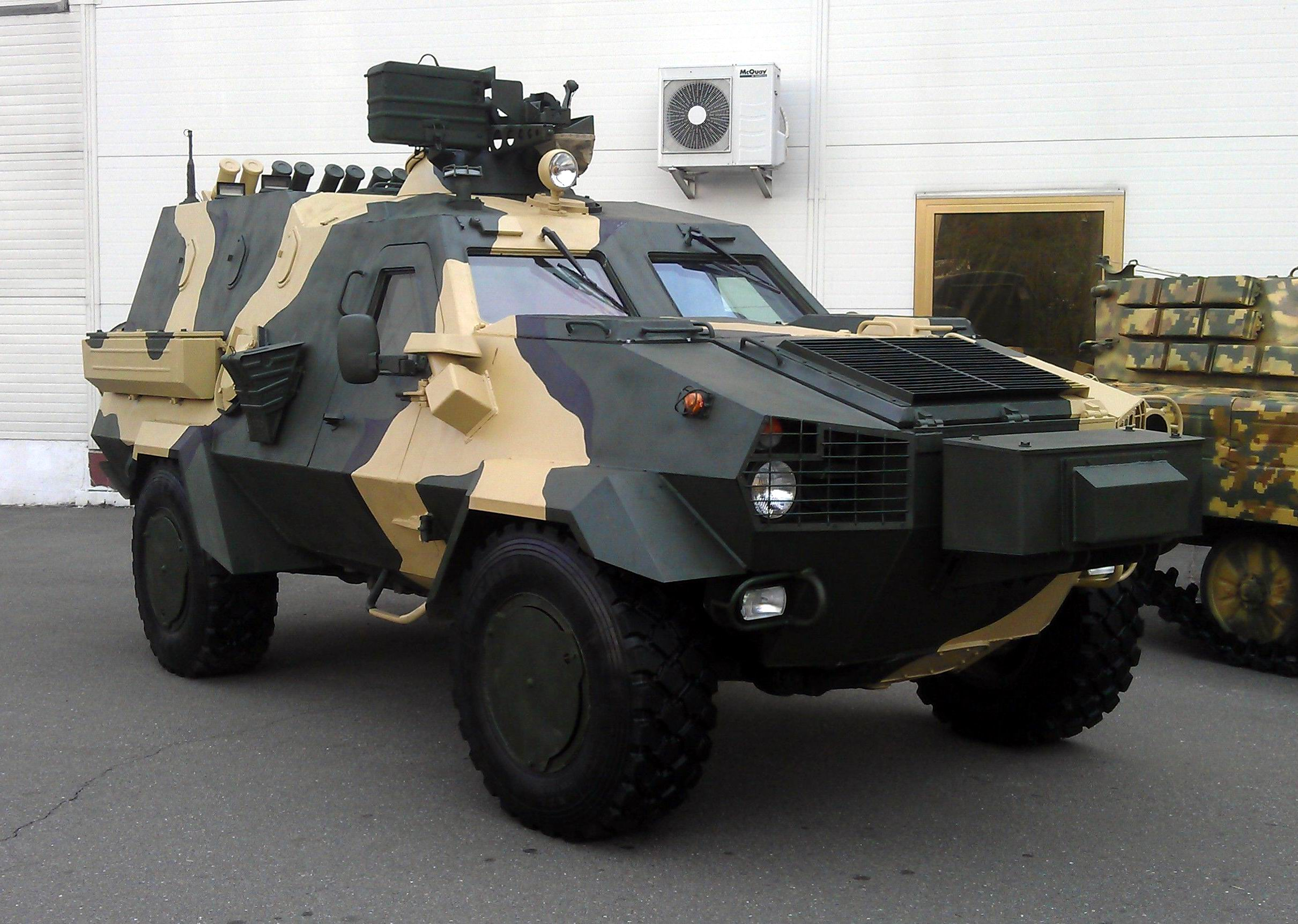
Dozor-B

The Dozor-B is a four-wheeled Ukrainian armored car.

The Dozor-B is also used by special units of the armed forces (quick reaction forces and military police) to carry out reconnaissance, patrolling, and peace-keeping operations, as well as being used as the main transportation vehicle under combat conditions (including NBC environment).

The layout of the armoured personnel carrier is based on a motor-car scheme. The vehicle is divided into two main compartments: power pack compartment and crew compartment.

The power pack compartment occupies the front and central parts of the hull and is separated from the crew compartment by an air-tight vibration/noise-insulating bulkhead. The compartment accommodates the engine with its operation support systems, transmission, main elements of the steering system, air system, braking system, and components of the air conditioning system and heating system.

The crew compartment occupies the central and rear parts of the hull and is used for accommodating the crew, installing the assemblies required for operation of the crew, and placing various equipment, ammunition, and SPTA. The crew compartment is divided into the driving compartment, fighting compartment, and troop compartment.

The driving compartment is located in the front part of the crew compartment and comprises the driver's station fitted with armored personnel carrier controls, and the commander's station fitted with communications devices and navigation equipment.

The fighting compartment is located in the central part of the crew compartment and comprises the gunner's station fitted with machine gun laying and control devices.

The troop compartment is located in the rear part of the crew compartment and comprises seats for troops, periscopic vision blocks, and firing ports to enable the troops to carry out observation and to fire small arms.

The crew compartment accommodates the filtering and ventilating unit and the main components of the ventilation, heating, and air conditioning systems.

=== NVO Praktyka ===
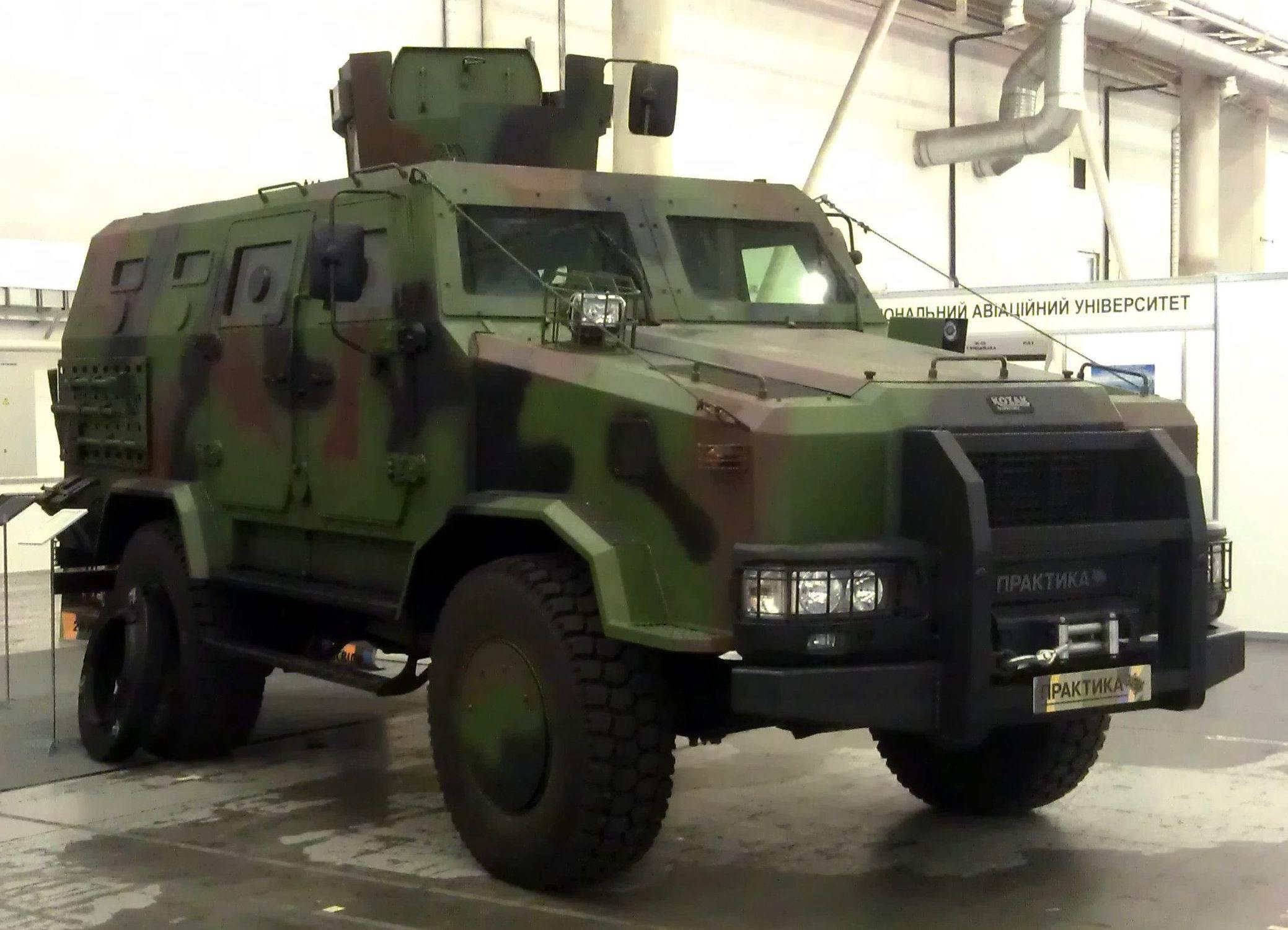
Kozak-2015

The Kozak is a Ukrainian armored personnel carrier with V-shaped hull intended to transport personnel and various loads.

The first Kozak vehicle first appeared on August 24, 2009, on Independence Day of Ukraine military parade in Kyiv

Only two vehicles were made until March 2014.

Third vehicle (also known as «Kozak-2014») was built in November 2014. In March 2015 the vehicle was armed with NSV machine gun

Another one «Kozak-2014» was built in 2015 and armed with anti-tank guided missile system. In May 2015 the vehicle appeared in the 169th Training Centre.

All Kozak vehicles are based on the Iveco chassis.

=== ZAZ ===
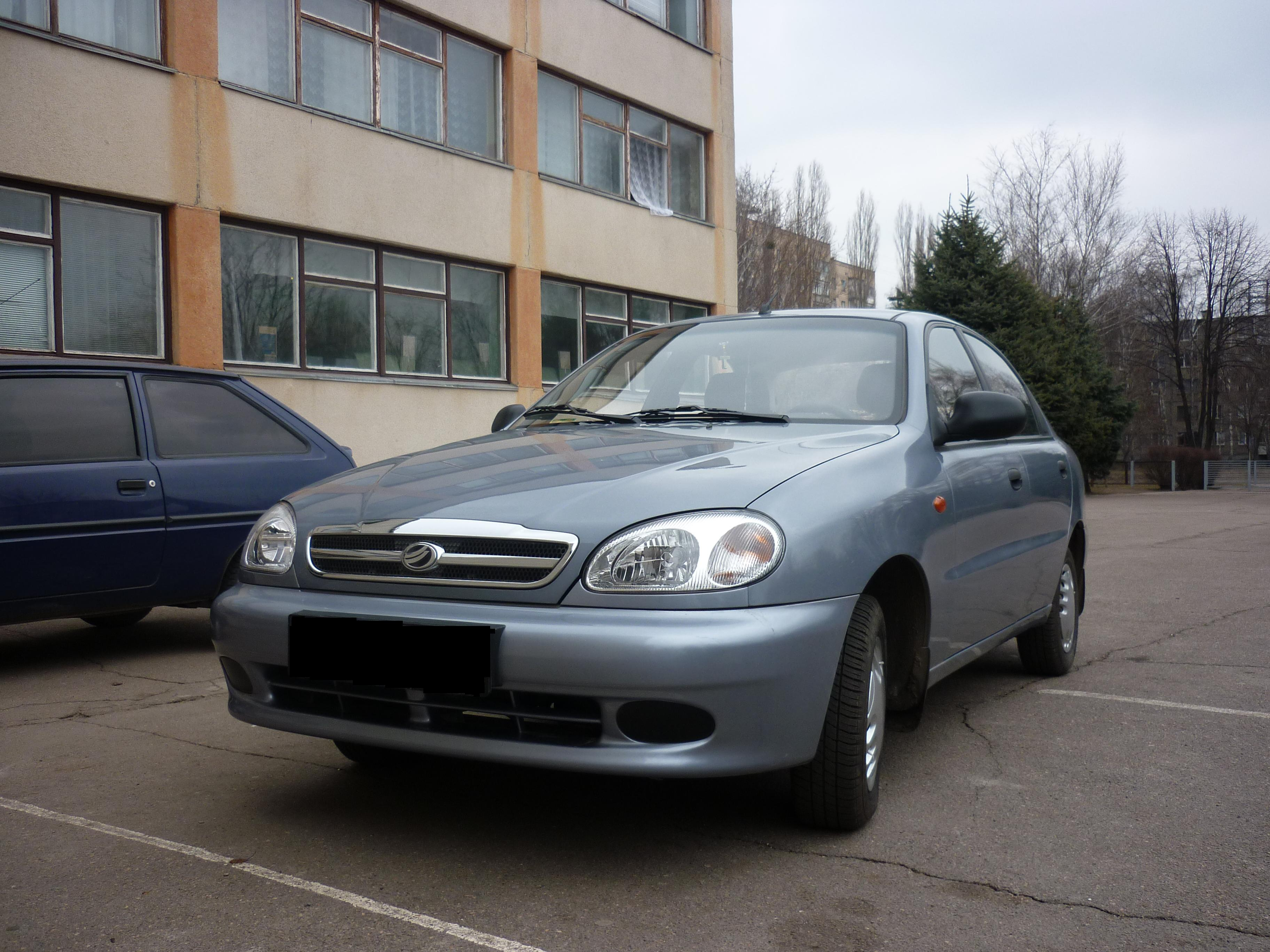
ZAZ Lanos/ZAZ Sens is a Ukrainian version of Daewoo Lanos

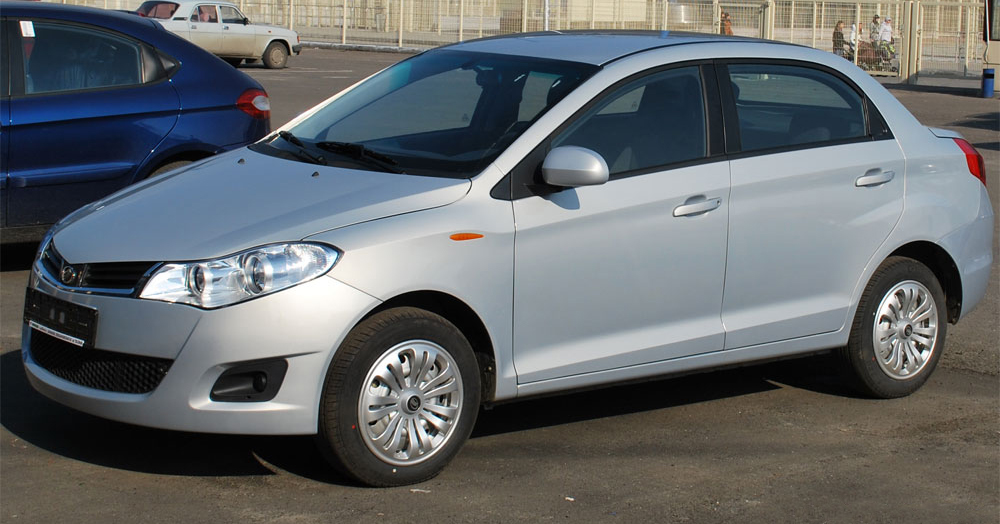
ZAZ Forza - rebadged Chery A13

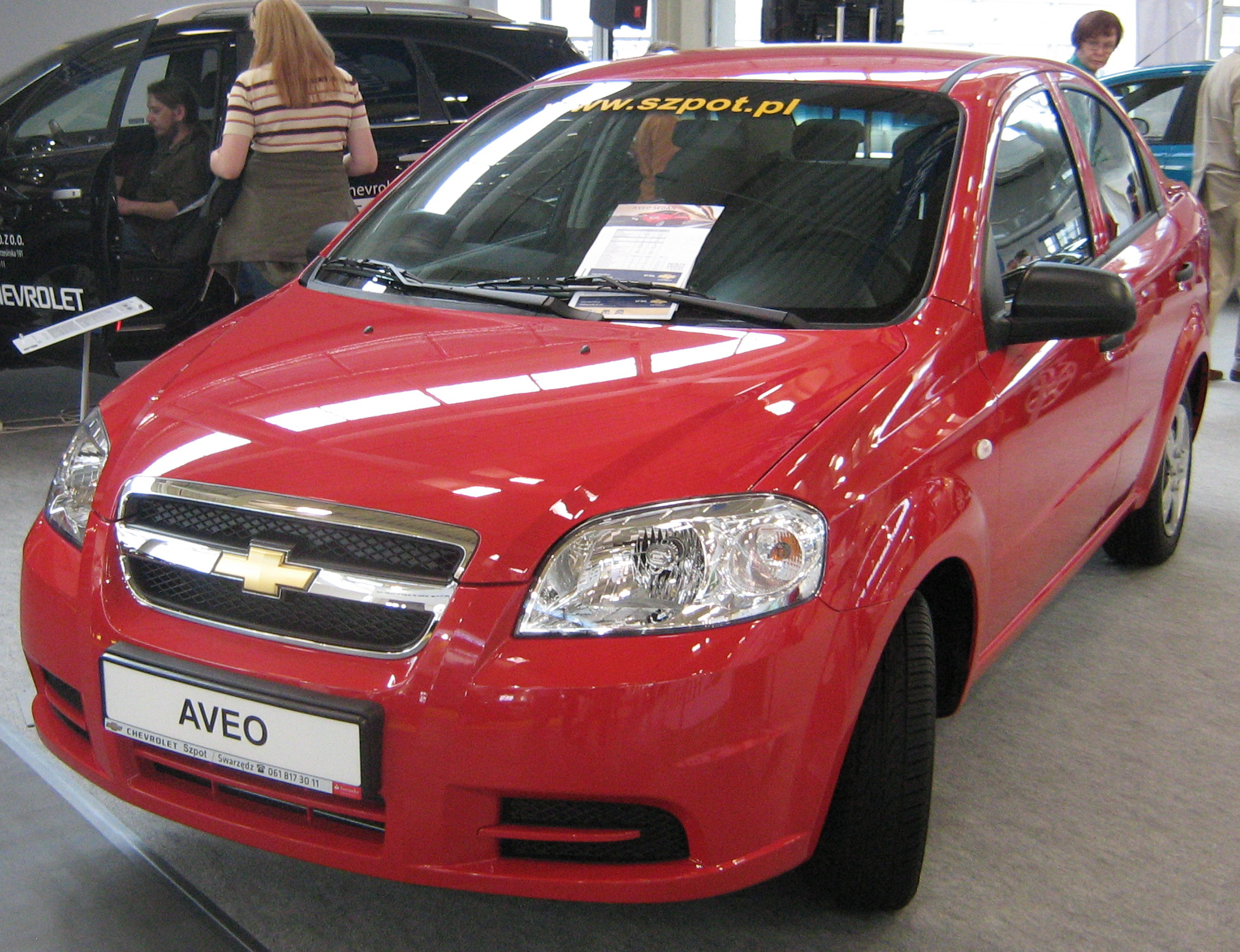
Chevrolet Aveo is produced in Zaporizhia under ZAZ Vida brand

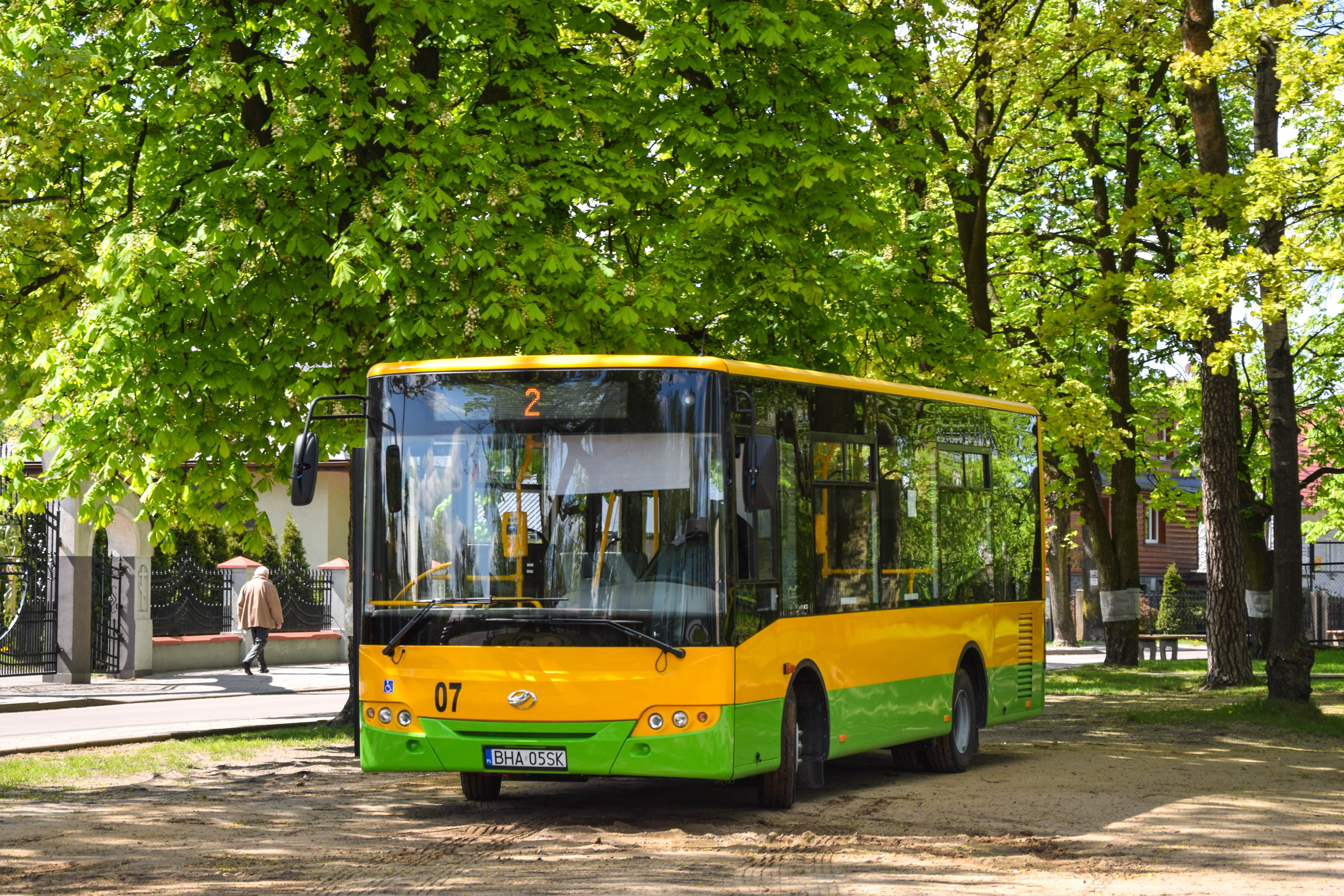
ZAZ-A10C I-Van

ZAZ (Zaporizhia Automobile Building Plant) is the main automobile-manufacturer of Ukraine, based in the south-eastern city of Zaporizhia. It also produces buses and trucks and is known for its former parent company's name, AvtoZAZ.

Beginning of passenger cars manufacturing in Ukraine started in 1959. Totally (from 1960 to 1994) there were 3,422,444 ZAZ Zaporozhets vehicles manufactured in Zaporizhia; air-cooled engines were manufactured in Melitopol.

In 1975 the factory was consolidated in the AvtoZAZ holding, which was transformed into joint-stock company in the 1990s. In 1986 ZAZ together with Comau installed a new production complex. The Illichivsk factory of automobile parts (IZAA) in one of the biggest freight sea ports on Black Sea in Illichivsk became part of the AutoZAZ holding.

In 1988 serial production of ZAZ-1102 Tavria family passenger cars was started in Zaporizhia. At the same time, the manufacture of water-cooled MeMZ engines began in Melitopol.

On June 1, 1994, the factory ceased production of its ZAZ-968M Zaporozhets.

In 1994-1997 ZAZ-1105 Dana was produced.

When AvtoZAZ-Daewoo joint venture with Daewoo Motors was formed in 1998, ZAZ was assigned to the new company as a 50% share on behalf of AvtoZAZ. Daewoo Motors made large investments and established the production of its own models, while keeping and modernizing the native ZAZ brand. Manufacturing of a new ZAZ-1102 Tavria Nova, ZAZ-1103 Slavuta and ZAZ-11055 Tavria Pick-up followed shortly thereafter. CKD kits of Daewoo Lanos, Daewoo Nubira and Daewoo Leganza started assembling the same year in Illichivsk; at the same time, CKD assembly of a number of older VAZ models started.

Following the bankruptcy of Daewoo Motors in 2001, the UkrAVTO corporation bought out AvtoZAZ holding in 2002. All of the AvtoZAZ manufacturing facilities (most notably, MeMZ and Illichivsk assembling plant) were reincorporated into ZAZ. The company even adopted a new logo. The Daewoo part in the joint venture was bought out by Swiss venture Hirsch & CIE in 2003.

End of 2004 saw the beginning of full-scale production of a completely domestic ZAZ Lanos (T150), now that CKD kits of Lanos were no longer supplied. In 2006, ZAZ reached an agreement with the Chinese manufacturer Chery Automobile to assemble passenger cars from kits.

By Decree of the President of Ukraine, CJSC "ZAZ" employees were rewarded with State awards of Ukraine in 2009.

In 2011 ZAZ started full-scale production of the Chery A13 under its own badge as ZAZ Forza. The same year production of the Chevrolet Aveo (T250) was moved from the FSO car factory to ZAZ.

In 2012 Zaporizhia Automobile Building Plant started serial full-scale production of a new car - ZAZ Vida.

In the first half of 2012 ZAZ manufactured 20,060 vehicles, a 30% decline from the same period in 2011.

== Former manufacturers ==
=== LAZ ===
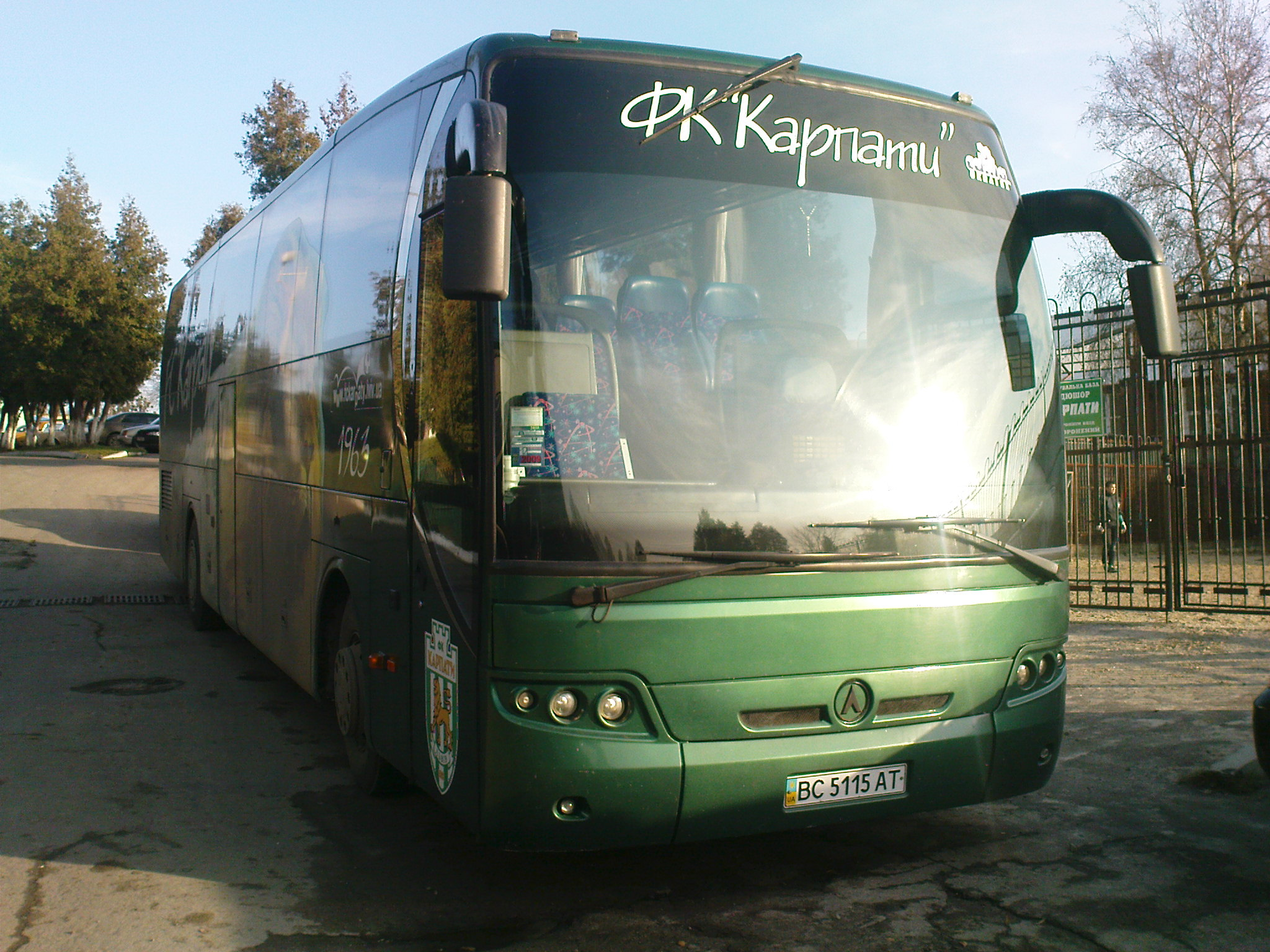
NeoLAZ 12 is used by FC Karpaty Lviv.

LAZ (Lviv Automobile Plant) is a bus manufacturing company in Lviv, Ukraine.

It was one of the major bus manufacturers in the Soviet Union and the largest-ever industrial company in the city. Now it is a private, holding company. It still manufactures buses of EURO class today.

The birth of L'vivs'ky Avtobusnyi Zavod dates back to 1945 with the opening of a factory in Lvov, western Ukraine city. In the first decade were built industrial vehicles such as trailers, excavators, mobile stores. Buses were introduced after the mid-Fifties with the first prototype (Laz-695) in 1956. Soon began mass production and within a year a thousand copies left the assembly line. In 1961 the debut of touring coaches (Laz-697E) and in 1985 intercity in medium sizes (Laz-4207). Record year was 1988 with 14,646 buses produced. The range was gradually enlarged to new models including, since the early Nineties, also trolleybuses. With the new Millennium debuted Hd touring coaches, low floor city buses and airports models. In 2001 the production facility was privatized and the property extended to more partners. In 2007, Laz celebrated a special anniversary: 365 000 buses produced from the beginning of its career. Goal which lead the Ukrainian company to enter the Guinness World Record.

=== LuAZ ===
The factory was founded in 1951, and was known as LARZ (Lutsk Automobile Repair Plant) and then LuMZ (Lutsk Machinebuilding Plant) from 1955. Along with truck repairs, the early products of this relatively small plant were mobile repair shop and refrigerated truck bodies on Moskvitch, ZIL, and UAZ frames.

Its first original design is the sturdy and simple LuAZ-967 off-road vehicle for the Red Army. It originated after the Korean War, when the Soviets saw a need for small off-road vehicles comparable to the American Jeep, to supplement the overly-large and -heavy GAZ-69s then in service. Developed at NAMI (the National Automobile Institute), the prototype, known as NAMI 049, was completed in 1958.

== Historical production by year ==
Historical production by year
Year	Production
1993	172,000
1994	109,000
1995	67,400
1996	12,100
1997	7,100
1998	33,000
1999	19,500
2000	31,255
2001	35,400
2002	48,100
2003	105,600
2004	187,500
2005	215,759
2006	286,800
2007	400,500
2008	424,000
2009	69,300
2010	83,133
2011	104,654
2012	76,281
2013	50,449
2014	28,751
2015	8,244
2016	5,264
2017	9,542
2018	6,623
2019	7,266
2020	4,952
