= Peugeot 607 =

French four-door car

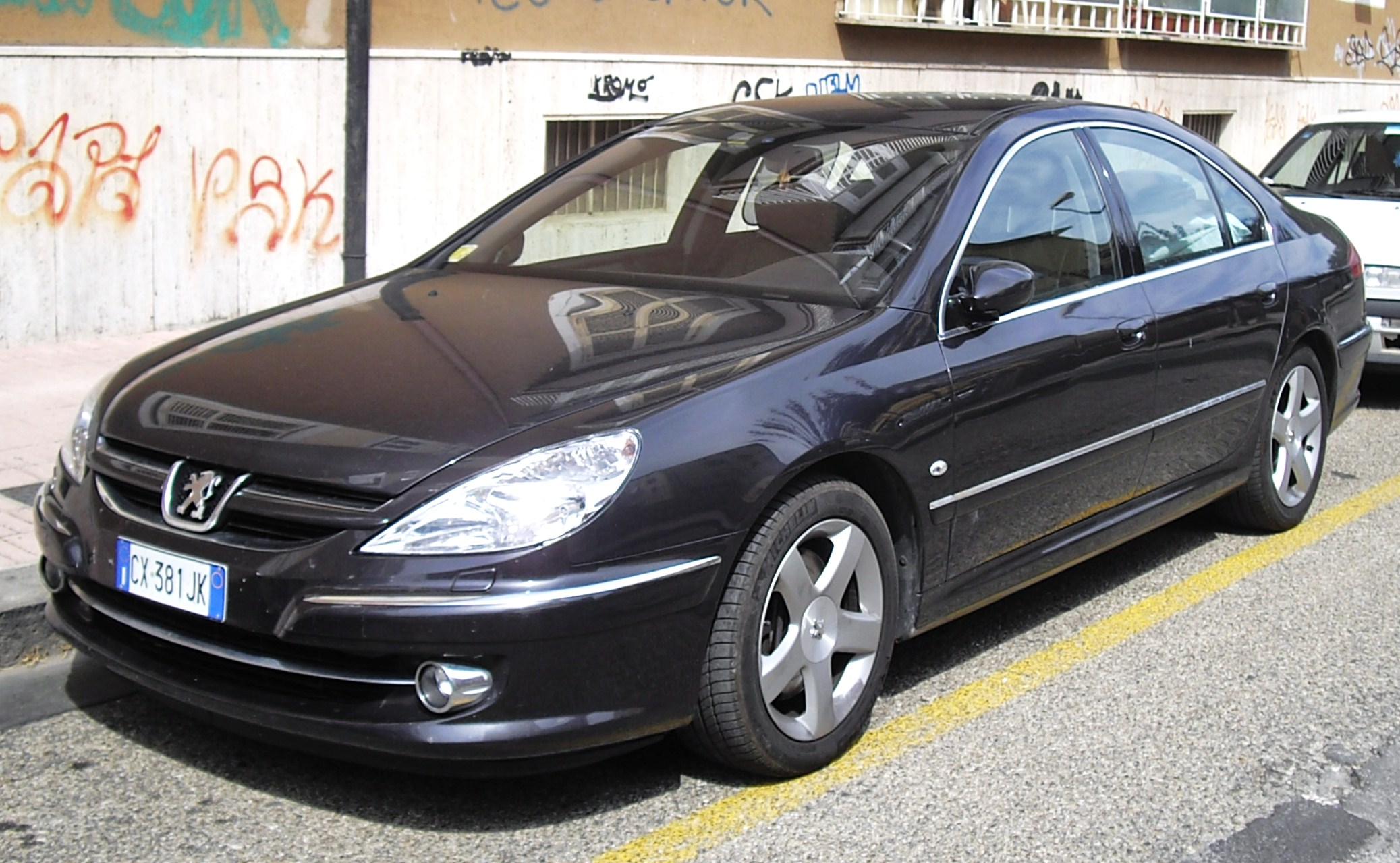

Overview
- Manufacturer: Peugeot
- Model code: Z8
- Production: September 1999 – June 2010 (LHD); 1999–2008 (RHD)
- Assembly: France: Sochaux (1999–2009); France: Rennes (2009–2010)
- Designer: Murat Günak

Body and chassis
- Class: Full-size car/Executive car (E)
- Body style: 4-door saloon
- Layout: Front-engine, front-wheel-drive
- Related: Peugeot 605; Citroën XM

Powertrain
- Engine: Petrol: 2.2 L EW12 I4; 3.0 L ES9 V6; Diesel: 2.0 L DW10 HDi I4 (turbo); 2.2 L DW12 HDi I4 (turbo/Bi-turbo); 2.7 L DT17 HDi V6 (Bi-turbo)
- Transmission: 5/6-speed manual 4/6-speed automatic

Dimensions
- Wheelbase: 2,800 mm (110.2 in)
- Length: 4,902 mm (193.0 in)
- Width: 1,835 mm (72.2 in)
- Height: 1,442 mm (56.8 in)
- Kerb weight: 1,610–1,798 kg (3,549–3,964 lb)

Chronology
- Predecessor: Peugeot 605
- Successor: Peugeot 508

The Peugeot 607 is an executive car produced by the French manufacturer Peugeot from September 1999 to June 2010.

The 607, along with the smaller 407, were superseded by the 508 in March 2011.

== History ==
The 607 was launched in October 1999, to replace the discontinued 605. It used its predecessor's chassis but had an all-new, more modern exterior design. The engine range (2.2 and 3.0 petrol, and 2.2 diesel) was completely new. Built in Sochaux until March 2009, the assembly of the 607 was transferred to PSA's Rennes plant in July the same year as production was being wound down.

Equipment levels were high, with all models getting air conditioning, CD player, electric windows, 8 airbags, anti-lock braking system, tyre-pressure monitor, and central locking as standard. Available was AMVAR nine-stage electronic damping control.

In France, its home market, the 607 was often chosen for official government use.

== Safety ==
Euro NCAP test results 4-door saloon, LHD (2002)
Test	Score	Rating
Adult occupant:	26	4 /5 stars
Pedestrian:	3	1 /4 stars

== Facelift ==
The 607 was restyled in November 2004, with the most notable modifications being the new front end and the 2.7 HDi V6 engine, rated at 150 kW (204 PS; 201 bhp), with a new six-speed automatic gearbox, which became also available on the V6 petrol model. The 2.0 and 2.2 diesel engines increased in output and included a 6-speed transmission, like the newly introduced Peugeot 407.

During 2008, the 607 was withdrawn from the United Kingdom, marking the end of right-hand drive 607s.

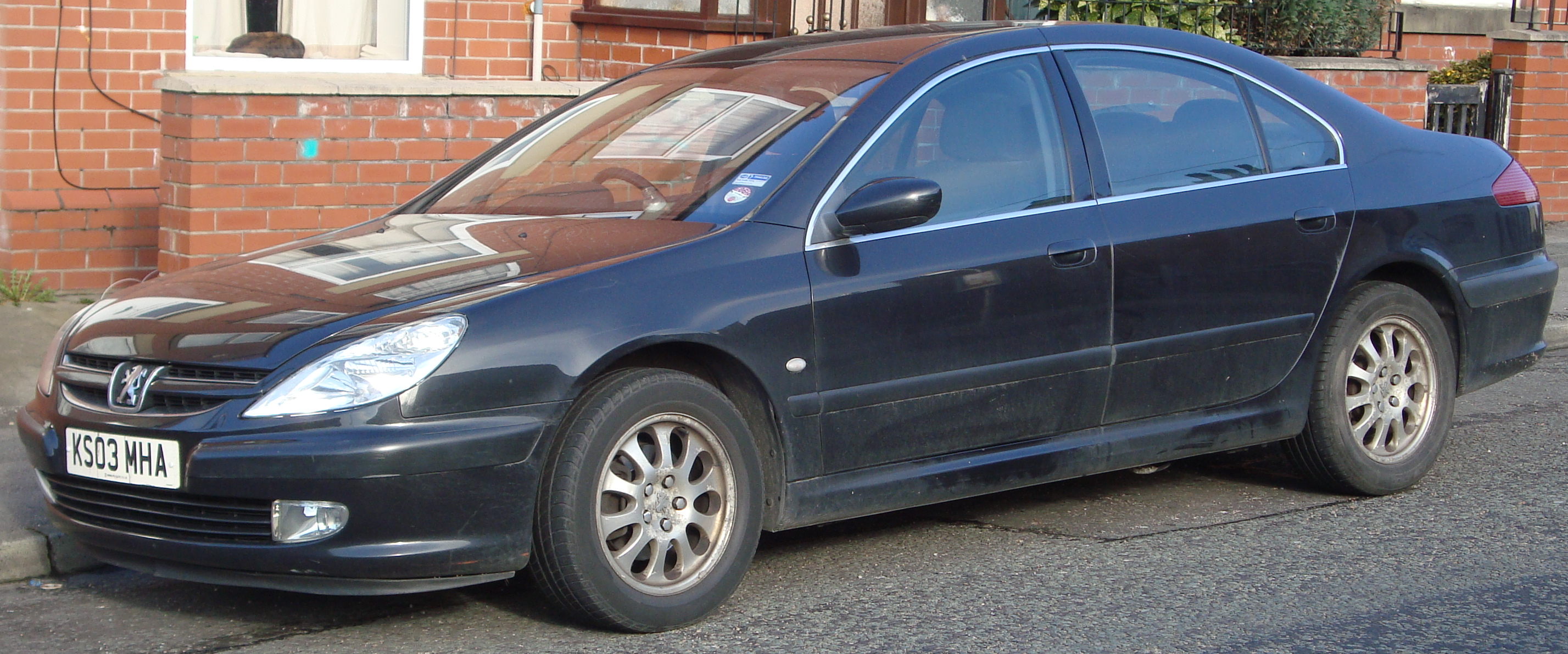
Pre-facelift, front

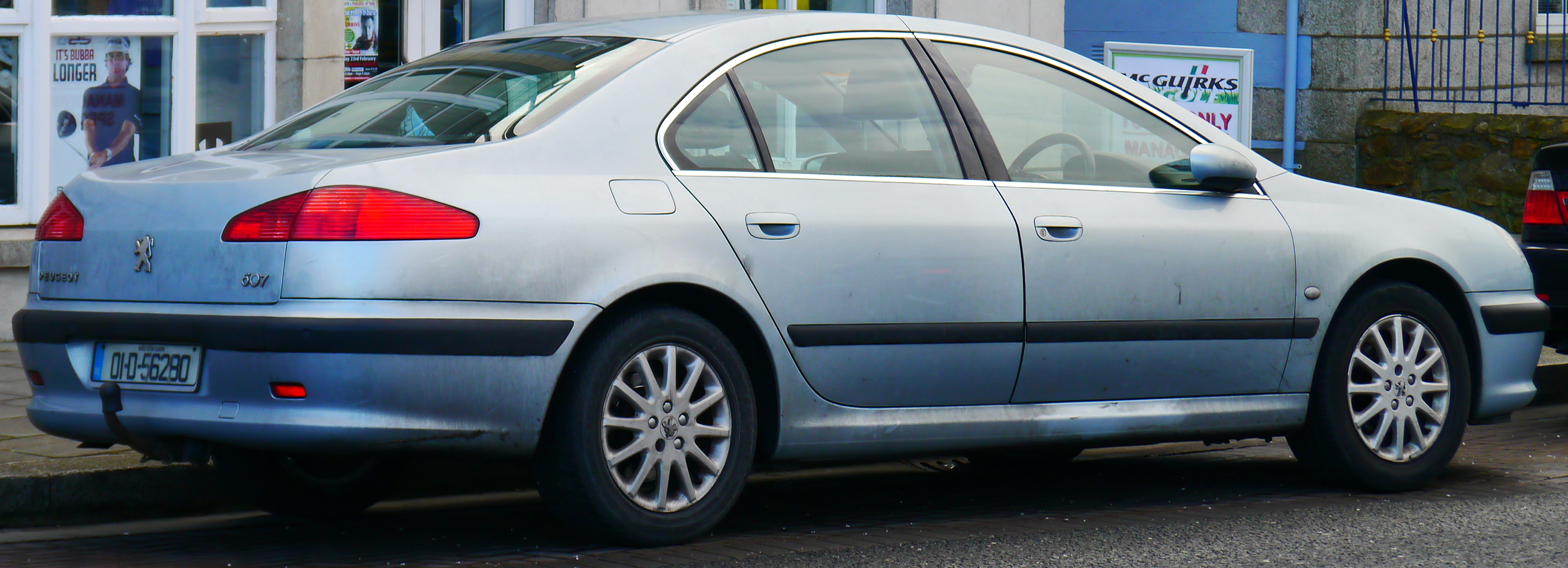
Pre-facelift, rear

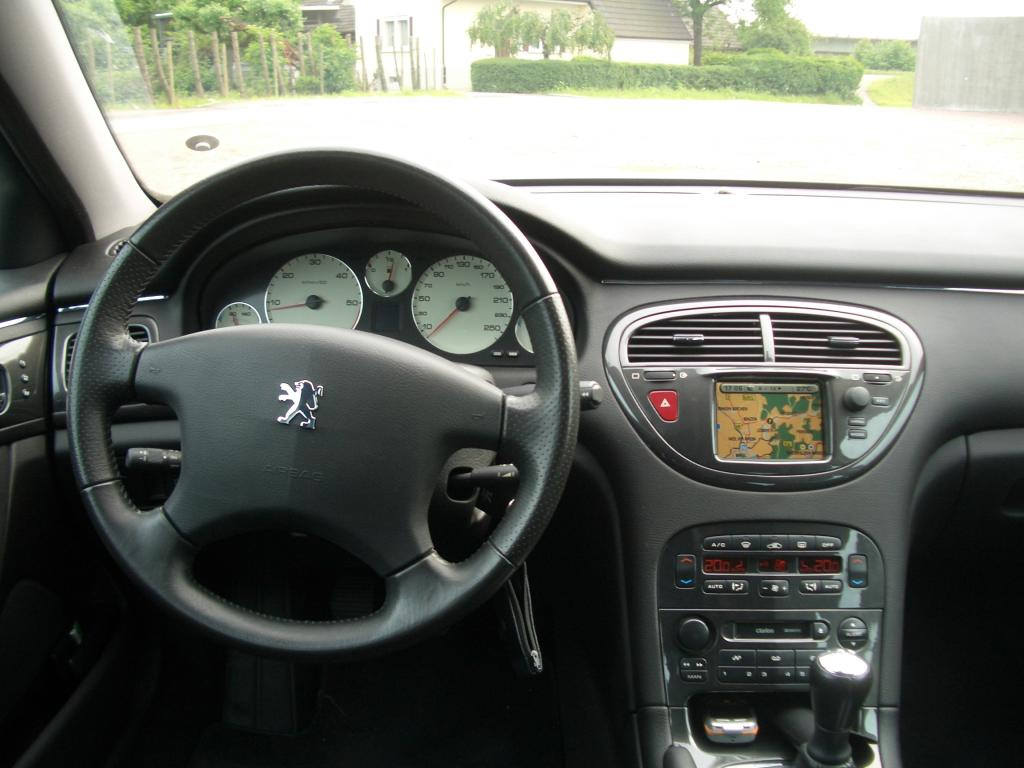
Pre-facelift interior

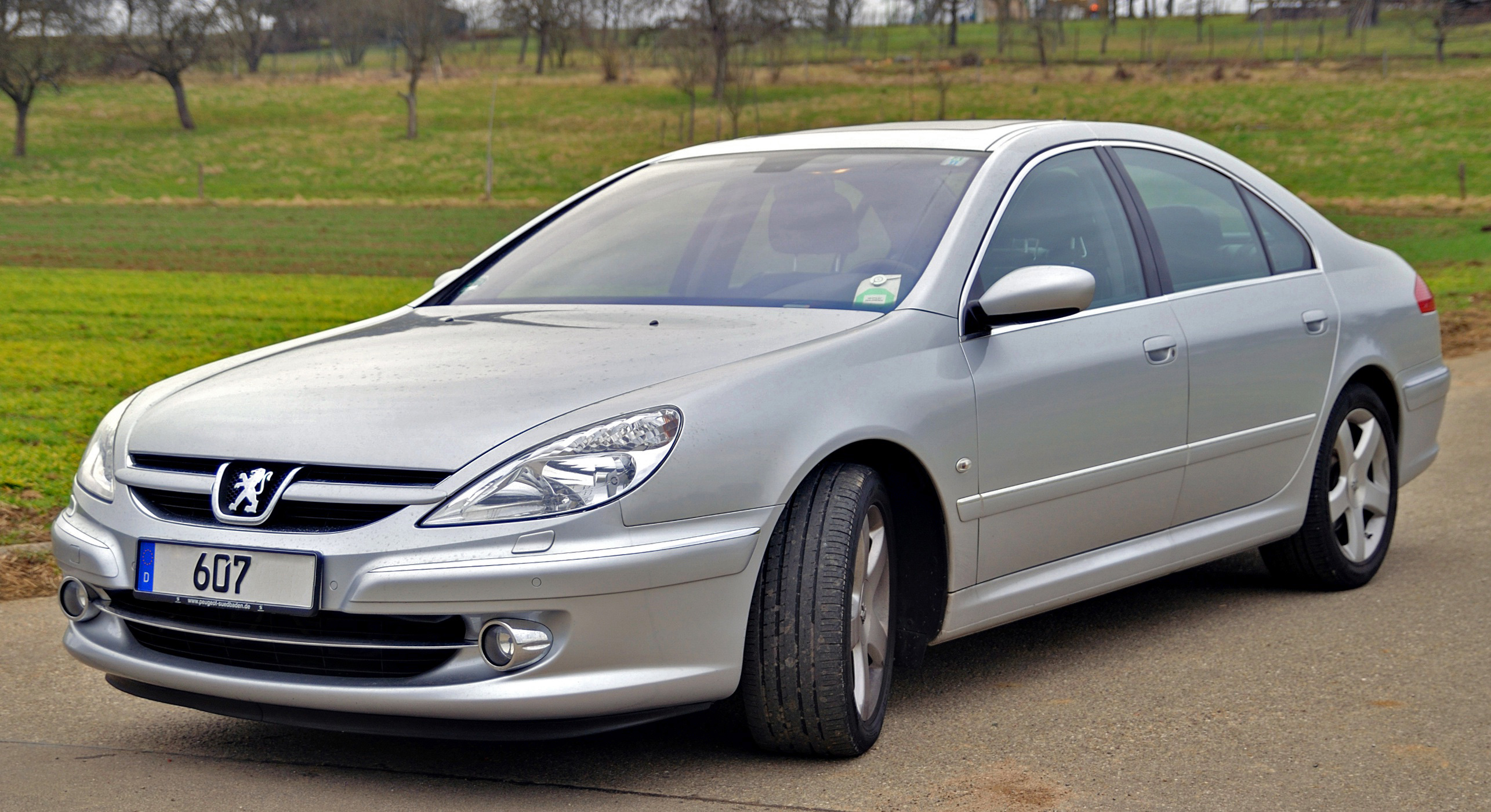
Facelift front

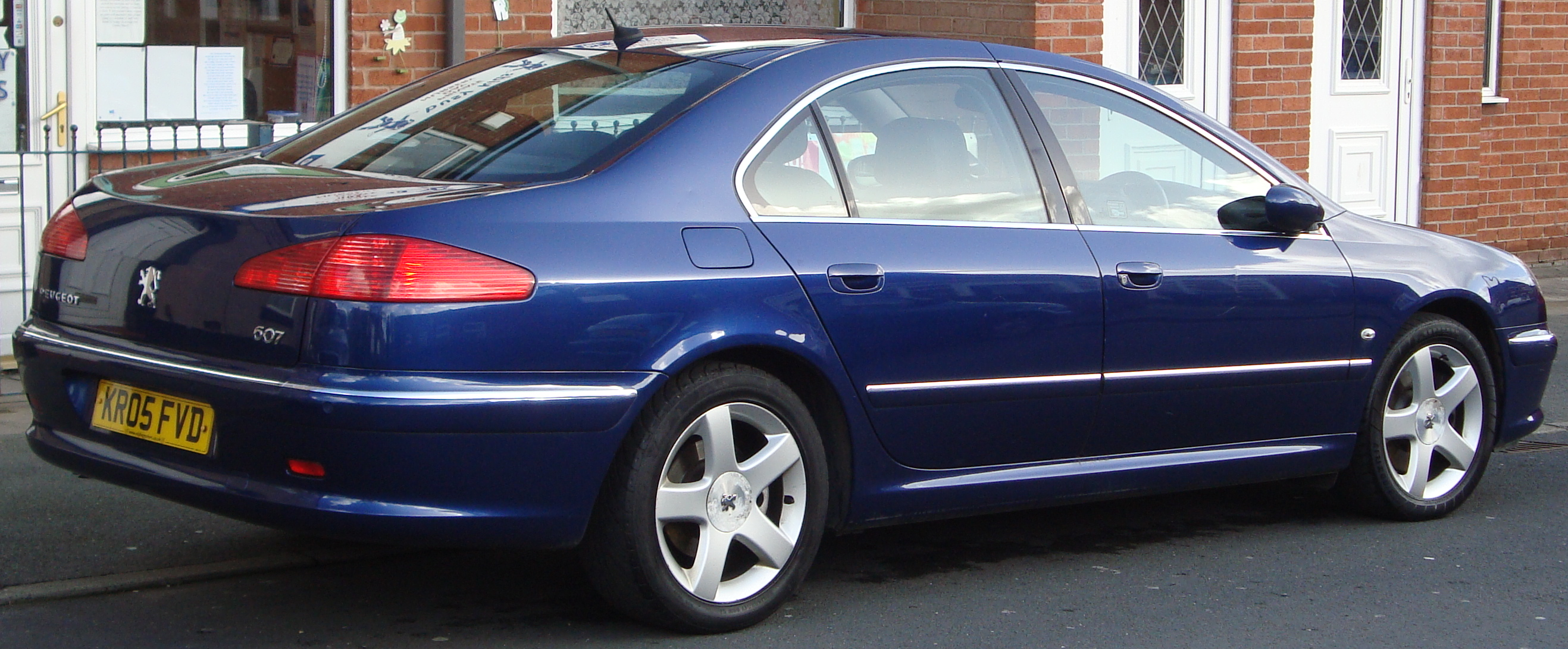
Facelift rear

== Peugeot 607 Paladine ==
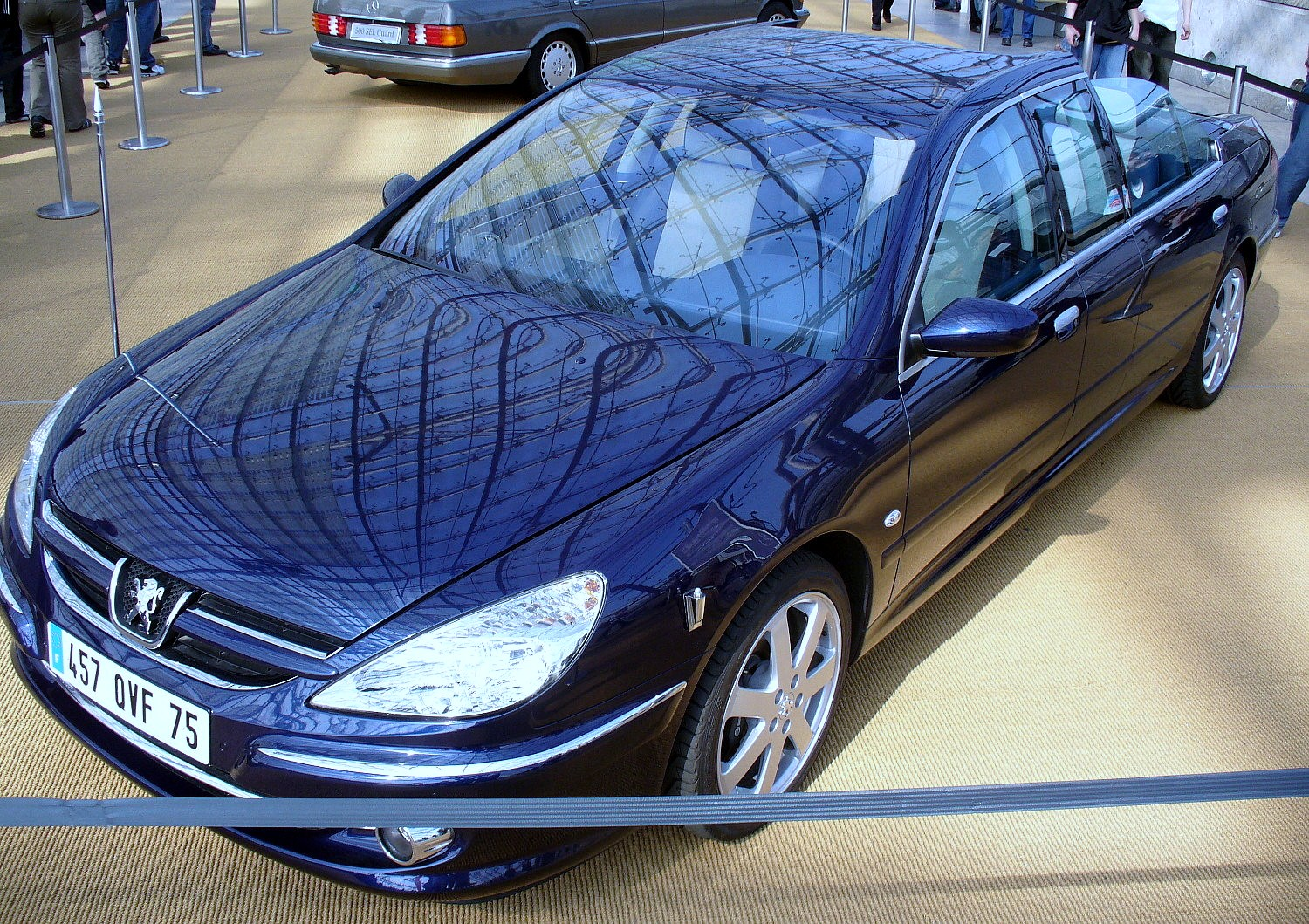
Peugeot 607 Paladine in 2008

The Peugeot 607 Paladine is a special Landaulet version of the 607 which was developed and built in 2000 in cooperation with Heuliez, as a concept car. The engine is the 3.0 V6. It is lengthened by 500 millimetres (20 in), making it 5.4 m (210 in) long, and the rear part is equipped with a retractable metallic roof similar to the Peugeot 206's or 307's CC. It is a one-off design.

The special leather interior was developed in cooperation with Hermès.

The car was first presented at the Geneva Motor Show in March 2000. It was used seven years later by then French President Nicolas Sarkozy for his inauguration on May 16, 2007. Meanwhile, the car had been retrofitted with the 2004 restyling of the 607 (updated front end).

== Successor ==
In November 2009, Philippe Varin from PSA announced that the successor of the Peugeot 607 would not be called the Peugeot 608, but instead the Peugeot 508. The 508 also replaced the smaller Peugeot 407.

== Engines ==
Gasoline

- 2.2 16v 158 PS (116 kW; 156 hp) – pre-facelift

Facelift: 163 PS (120 kW; 161 hp)

- 3.0 V6 24v 207 PS (152 kW; 204 hp) – pre-facelift

Facelift: 211 PS (155 kW; 208 hp)

Diesel

- 2.0 HDi 109 PS (80 kW; 108 hp) – pre-facelift
- 2.0 HDi 136 PS (100 kW; 134 hp) – facelift
- 2.2 HDi 133 PS (98 kW; 131 hp) – pre-facelift
- 2.2 HDi Biturbo 170 PS (125 kW; 168 hp) – facelift
- 2.7 HDi Biturbo 204 PS (150 kW; 201 hp) – facelift

== Sales ==
Year	Worldwide Production	Worldwide sales	Notes
1998	23		
1999	533		
2000	23,509		
2001	37,790		
2002	27,161		
2003	21,528		
2004	18,076	18,100	
2005	18,771	19,100	
2006	9,627	10,500	
2007	5,983	7,500	
2008	4,565	3,900	
2009	900	1,900	
2010	956	1,000	
2011		53	
