= Peugeot 605 =

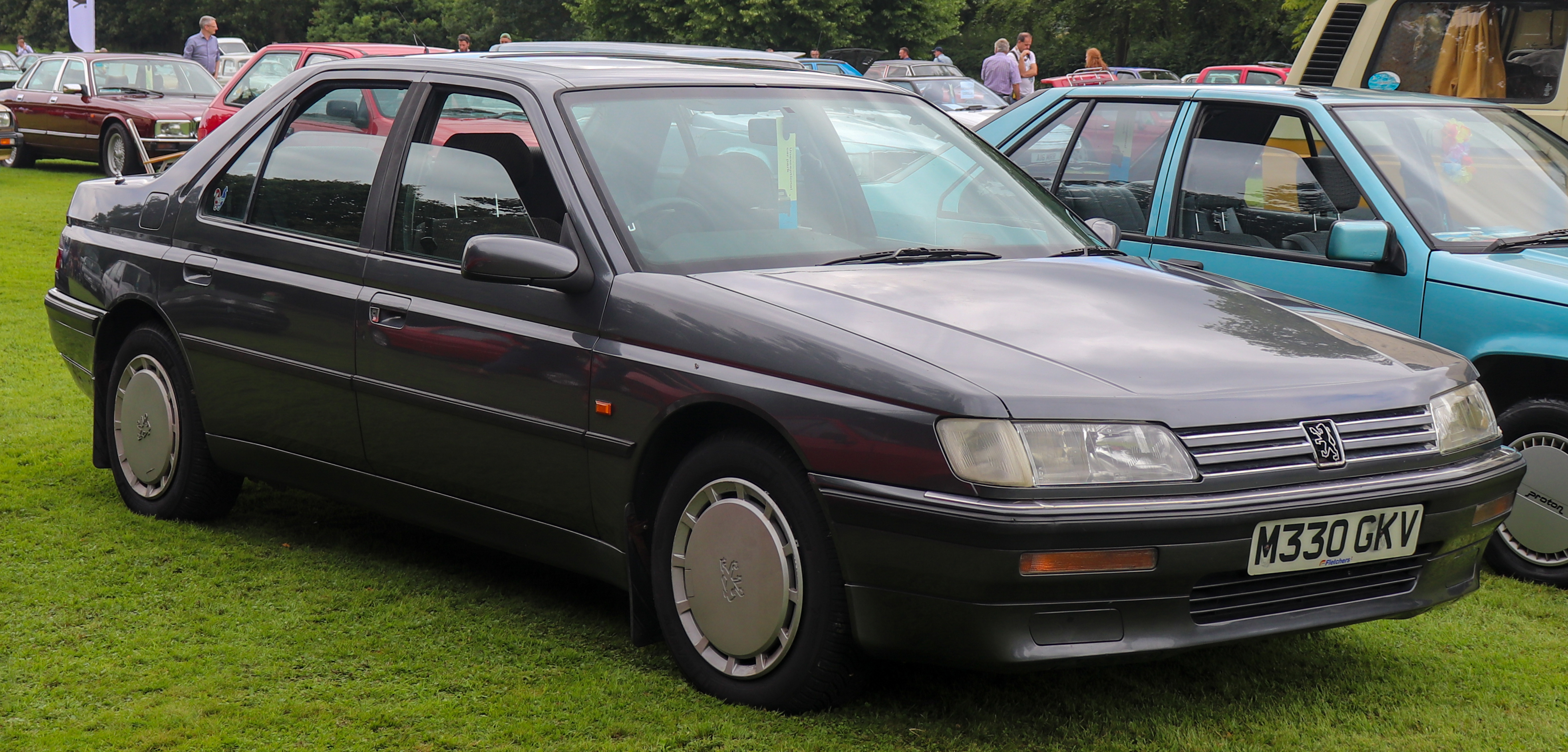

Overview
- Manufacturer: Peugeot
- Production: July 1989 – September 1999
- Assembly: France: Sochaux (Sochaux Plant); France: Vesoul
- Designer: Pininfarina

Body and chassis
- Class: Executive car (E)
- Body style: 4-door saloon
- Layout: FF layout
- Related: Citroën XM

Powertrain
- Engine: Petrol: 2.0L XU10 I4; 2.0L XU10 J4R 16V I4; 2.0L XU10 J2TE turbo I4; 2.9L ES9J4 DOHC 24V V6; 3.0L ZPJ V6; 3.0L ZPJ4 24V V6; Diesel: 2.1L XUD11 A 12V diesel I4; 2.1L XUD11 BTE 12V TD I4; 2.5L DK5ATE 12V TD I4
- Transmission: 5-speed manual 4-speed ZF automatic

Dimensions
- Wheelbase: 2,799 mm (110.2 in)
- Length: 4,763 mm (187.5 in)
- Width: 1,798 mm (70.8 in)
- Height: 1,419 mm (55.9 in)
- Curb weight: 1,500 kg (3,307 lb)

Chronology
- Predecessor: Peugeot 604; Talbot Tagora
- Successor: Peugeot 607

The Peugeot 605 is an executive car produced by the French manufacturer Peugeot between 1989 and 1999, with a facelift in 1995.

== History ==
The 605 was a saloon built on the same platform as the Citroën XM and was the successor to the critically well received, but slow selling, Peugeot 604, which went out of production four years earlier. The popular Peugeot 505 model was thus phased out in the end of the 1980s and beginning of the 1990s in favour of two cars, the large family car 405 and the executive car 605.

Peugeot kept the estate version of the 505 in production until 1992, and had planned to replace it with an estate version of the 605, but this was eventually abandoned.

The car was launched in July 1989 in left-hand drive form; a right-hand version was launched onto the British market during the first half of 1990. At the time of the original launch, only petrol engines were available.

In April 1990, the turbodiesel followed, and the naturally aspirated diesel was added in autumn 1990.

High equipment levels, a luxurious interior, a smooth ride, and exceptional handling were strong points for the 605. But Peugeot had always struggled to succeed with large cars outside France and the 605 was no different. It was too similar in design and appearance to the smaller Peugeot 405 to command a price premium, while its dashboard also drew criticism for its uninspired design.

PSA Peugeot Citroën, like Vauxhall/Opel, has not been able to address the "luxury brand" issue effectively, the automobile market seeming to reward segmentation by brands from one factory, like Lexus/Toyota, Acura/Honda, and Audi/Volkswagen.

Also like the XM, the 605 initially suffered from quality issues that resulted in a number of breakdowns or malfunctions (particularly with the ambitious electrics). An extensive recall operation took place at great cost, in which most of the engine room wiring and exhaust system (as well as multiple other parts) were exchanged, but by then the damage to the car's reputation had been done.

In 1995, Peugeot tried to solve the problems by unveiling an extensively revamped 605 (known as the "Phase 2" model); it received a facelift which looked modern at its time, but also the interior was vastly improved by giving it more ergonomic controls and a refreshed look. The naturally aspirated diesel was discontinued at this time, as the new 406 was placed to supplant the lower specification 605s.

Performance and handling were improved as well, and some of the reliability issues were solved. Technological advances were made, most remarkably the side airbags, although sales remained low.

After the launch of the well received Peugeot 406 (that was larger than the 405 it replaced) in 1995, 605 sales dropped to near insignificant levels, and it was quietly dropped in September 1999. The 605's successor, the Peugeot 607, was launched in the autumn of 1999, and was slightly more successful on the domestic and export markets.

The end of 605 production in 1999 spelled the end of the "05" generation Peugeots in Europe after more than twenty years, this generation had started in 1977, with the 305.

A 605 served as a French presidential state car, being used to drive around president François Mitterrand.

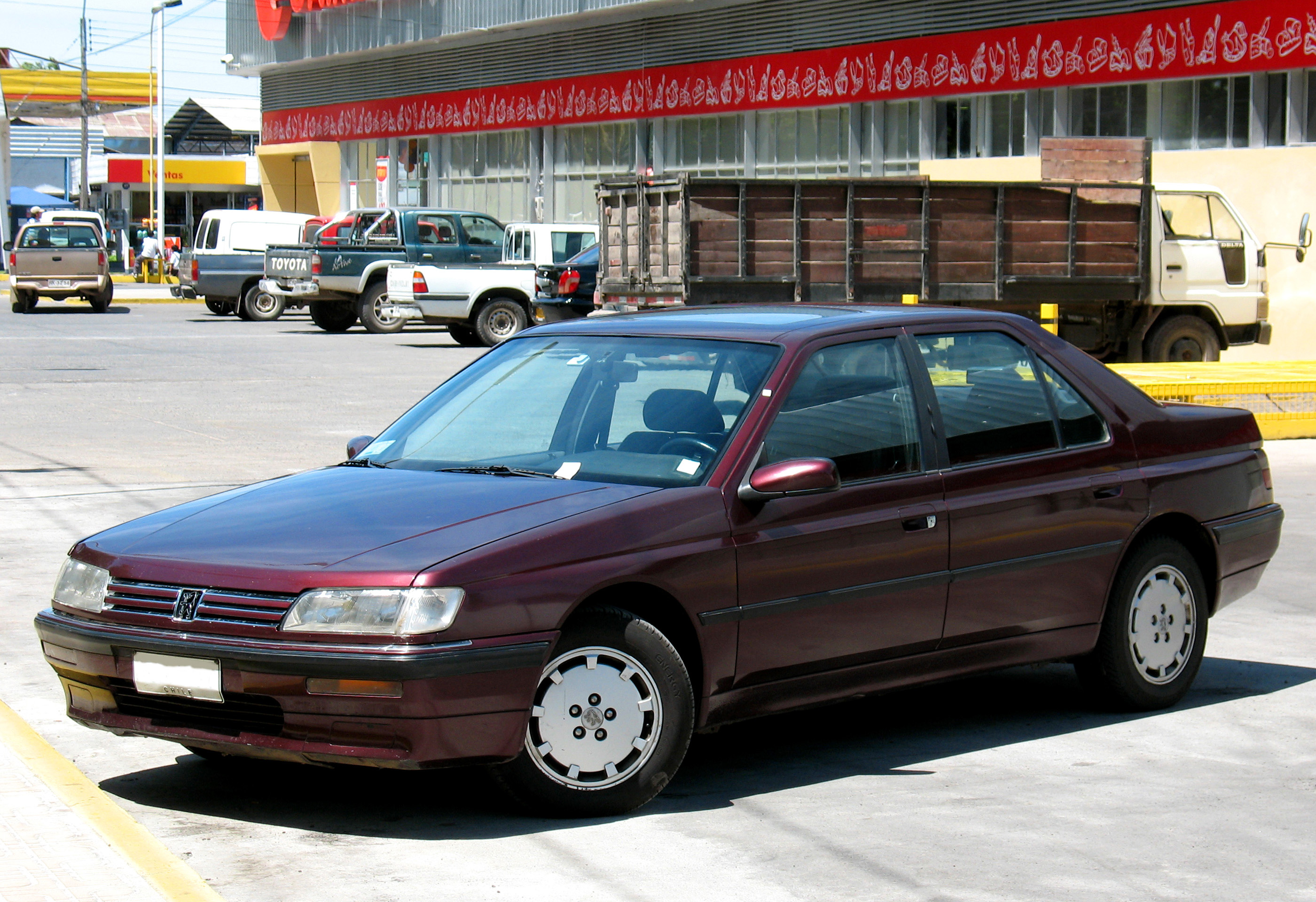
Peugeot 605 (pre-facelift)

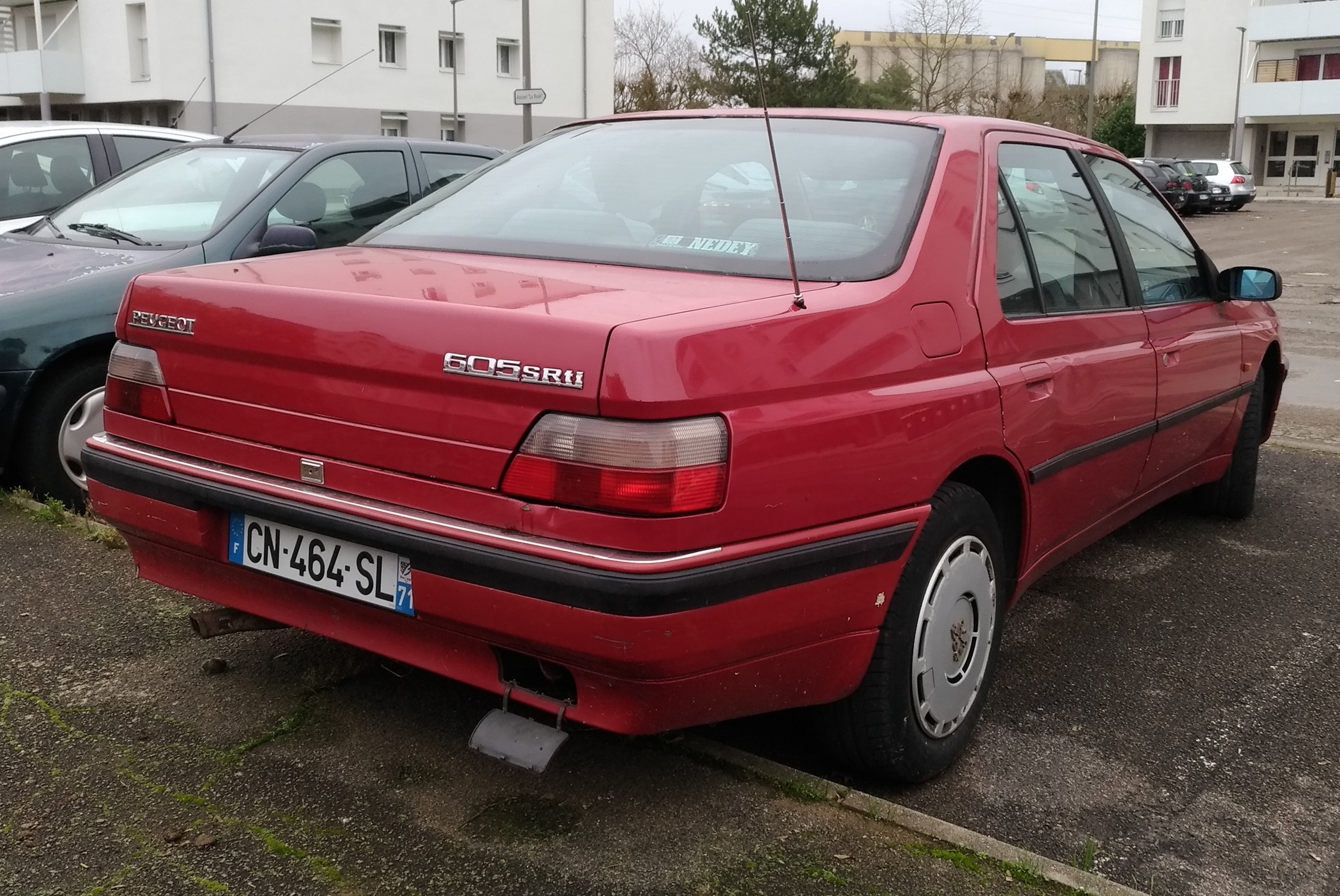
Peugeot 605 (pre-facelift; rear view)

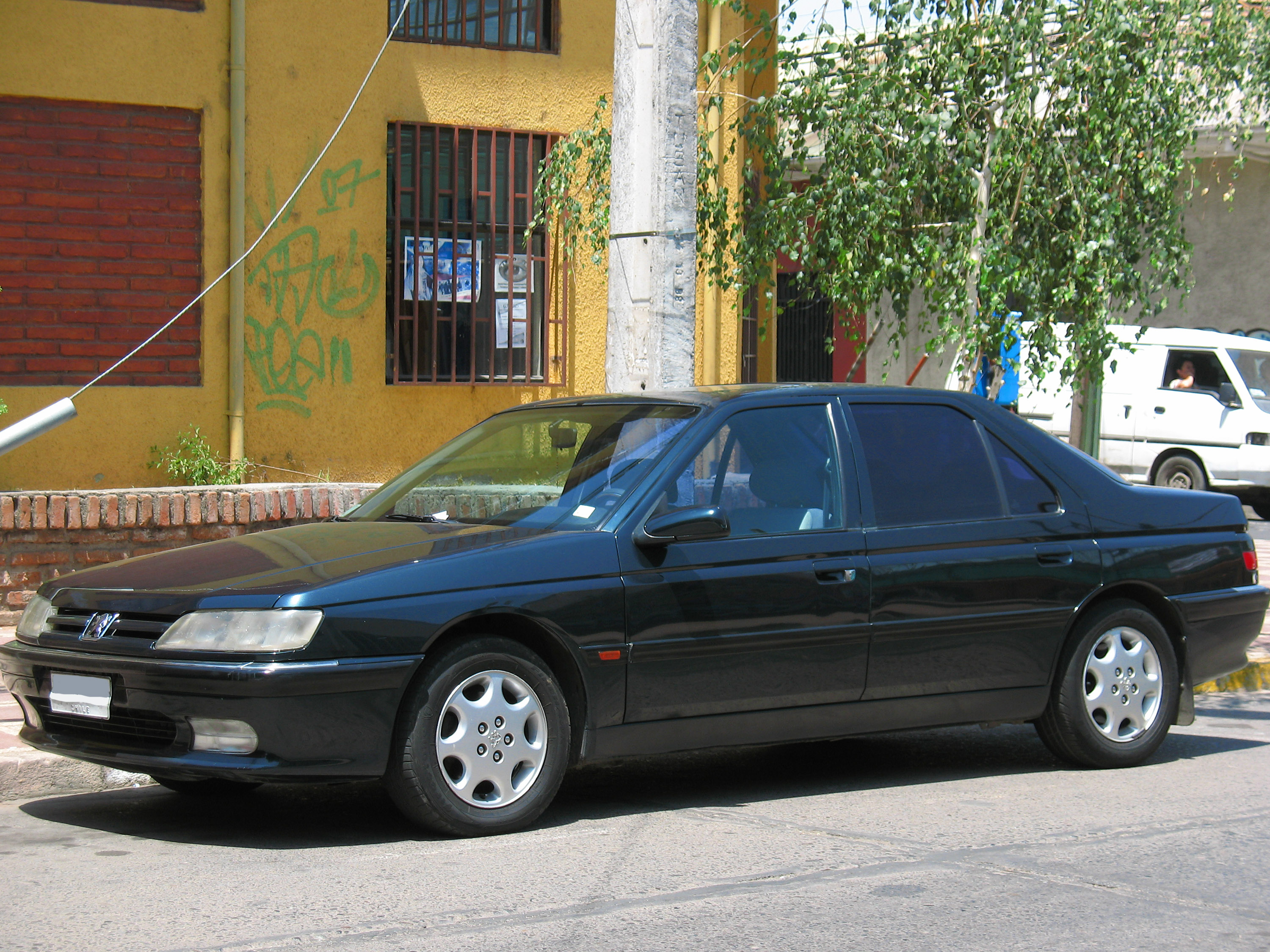
Peugeot 605 (facelift)

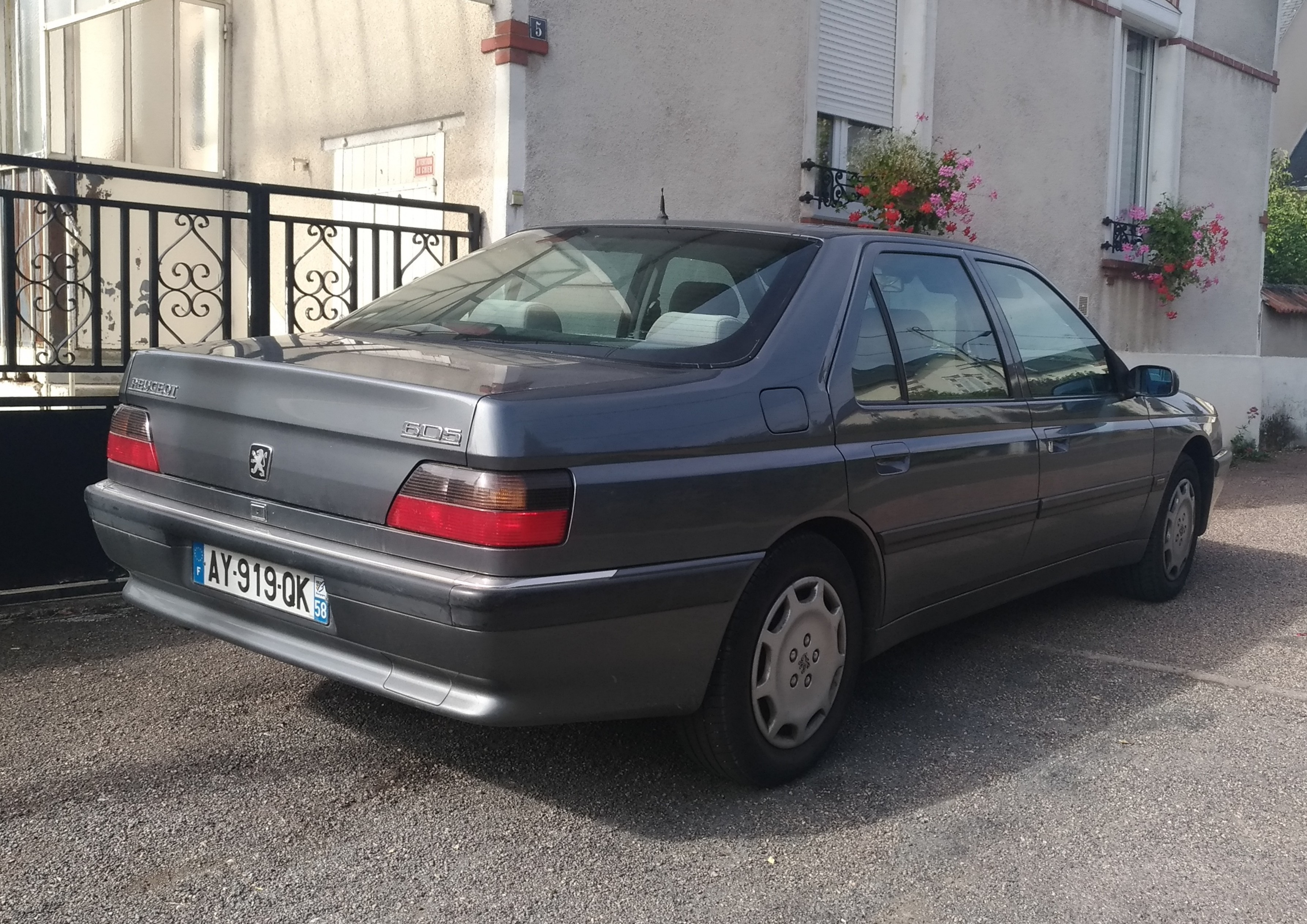
Peugeot 605 (facelift; rear view)

== Design and styling ==
Its appearance resembles that of the Alfa Romeo 164, launched in 1987, and also styled by Pininfarina. Despite the resemblance, the Peugeot did not use the Type Four platform; it rode the same platform as the Citroën XM. As it closely followed Peugeot's design language of the time, the 605 bears a strong visual resemblance to the smaller Peugeot 405, this was generally considered to harm the 605 in the marketplace, as the car was not distinguished enough from its lower cost brethren.

== Engines ==
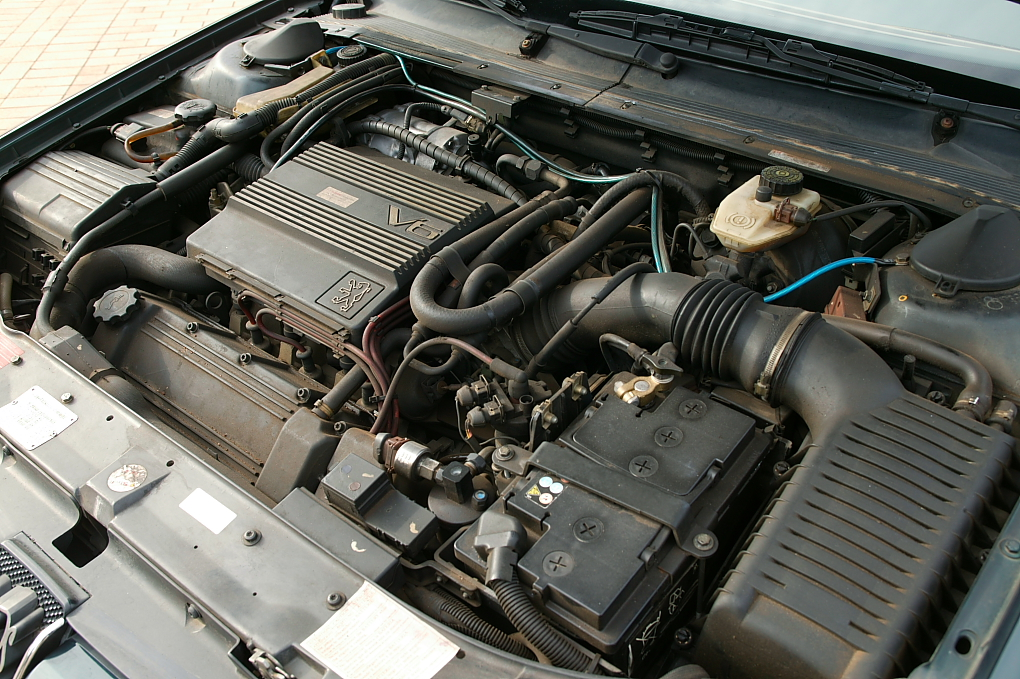
Peugeot 605 V6 12V (petrol engine)

Eight petrol engines were offered during the 605's lifetime:

- 2.0-litre (1,998 cc) 8-valve, carbureted inline-four, 85 kW (115 PS; 113 bhp)
- 2.0-litre (1,998 cc) 8-valve, fuel injected inline-four, 79 kW (107 PS; 106 bhp)
- 2.0-litre (1,998 cc) 8-valve, fuel injected inline-four, 89 kW (121 PS; 119 bhp) – a non-catalyzed version available in multiple markets produces 94 kW (128 PS; 126 bhp)
- 2.0-litre (1,998 cc) 8-valve, fuel injected turbocharged inline-four, 108 kW (147 PS; 145 bhp)
- 2.0-litre (1,998 cc) 16-valve, fuel injected inline-four, 97 kW (132 PS; 130 bhp)
- 2.9-litre (2,946 cc) 24-valve, fuel injected V6, 140 kW (190 PS; 188 bhp)
- 3.0-litre (2,975 cc) 12-valve, fuel injected V6, 123 kW (167 PS; 165 bhp) - 3.0-litre (2,963 cc) from 1993 on
- 3.0-litre (2,975 cc) 24-valve, fuel injected V6, 147 kW (200 PS; 197 bhp) - 3.0-litre (2,963 cc) from 1993 on

As well as three diesel engines:

- 2.1-litre (2,088 cc) 12-valve, turbocharged inline-four, indirect injection, 80 kW (109 PS; 107 bhp)
- 2.1-litre (2,138 cc) 12-valve, normally aspirated inline-four, indirect injection, 60 kW (82 PS; 80 bhp)
- 2.4-litre (2,446 cc) 12-valve, turbocharged inline-four, indirect injection, 95 kW (129 PS; 127 bhp)

The carbureted four cylinder petrol engine and the normally aspirated diesel (which arrived for the model year of 1991), though reliable, were generally considered to be simply over matched by the car's weight. Even the turbodiesel came in for such criticism, with its hard working engine requiring as much fuel as its bigger competitors.

The fuel injected inline four was better received though it was criticised for lacking low and mid range punch, whereas the powerful 123 kW (167 PS) V6 suffered from criticisms over poor fuel economy when combined with an automatic gearbox. In the beginning of 1993, all PRV V6 engines lost 12 cc of engine displacement, in order to fit in a lower taxation class in Switzerland.

The same issue affected the top of the range V6 24 version, in spite of its all new twenty four valve cylinder head, though a top speed of 235 km/h (146 mph) made poor fuel economy more acceptable to generally well heeled customers. The 2.1 turbo diesel was widely regarded as a good powertrain, but was outclassed by the new direct injection engines introduced in 1988 by Fiat and in 1990 by Audi.

A 2.0 litre (8 valve) turbocharged four cylinder petrol engine 108 kW (147 PS) was added in 1991, and provided good performance but proved unreliable. Later, a 2.5 turbodiesel 95 kW (129 PS) completed the diesel lineup. In 1997, the antiquated 3.0 litre V6 engines were replaced at long last by a unified V6 option: an all new 2.9 litre, 24 valve, 140 kW (190 PS; 188 bhp) V6.

== Fiction ==
The Peugeot 605 is featured prominently in the car chase scenes of John Frankenheimer's film Ronin (1998). In the first chase, three Peugeot 605s are escorting a Citroën XM carrying a mysterious briefcase, where it comes under attack by mercenaries, including the character played by Robert De Niro.

== Sales ==
A total of 254,505 units have been produced. All came from Sochaux factory, except for 192 units manufactured in Vesoul (between 1991 and 1992).
