= PSA EW/DW engine =

EW/DW engine
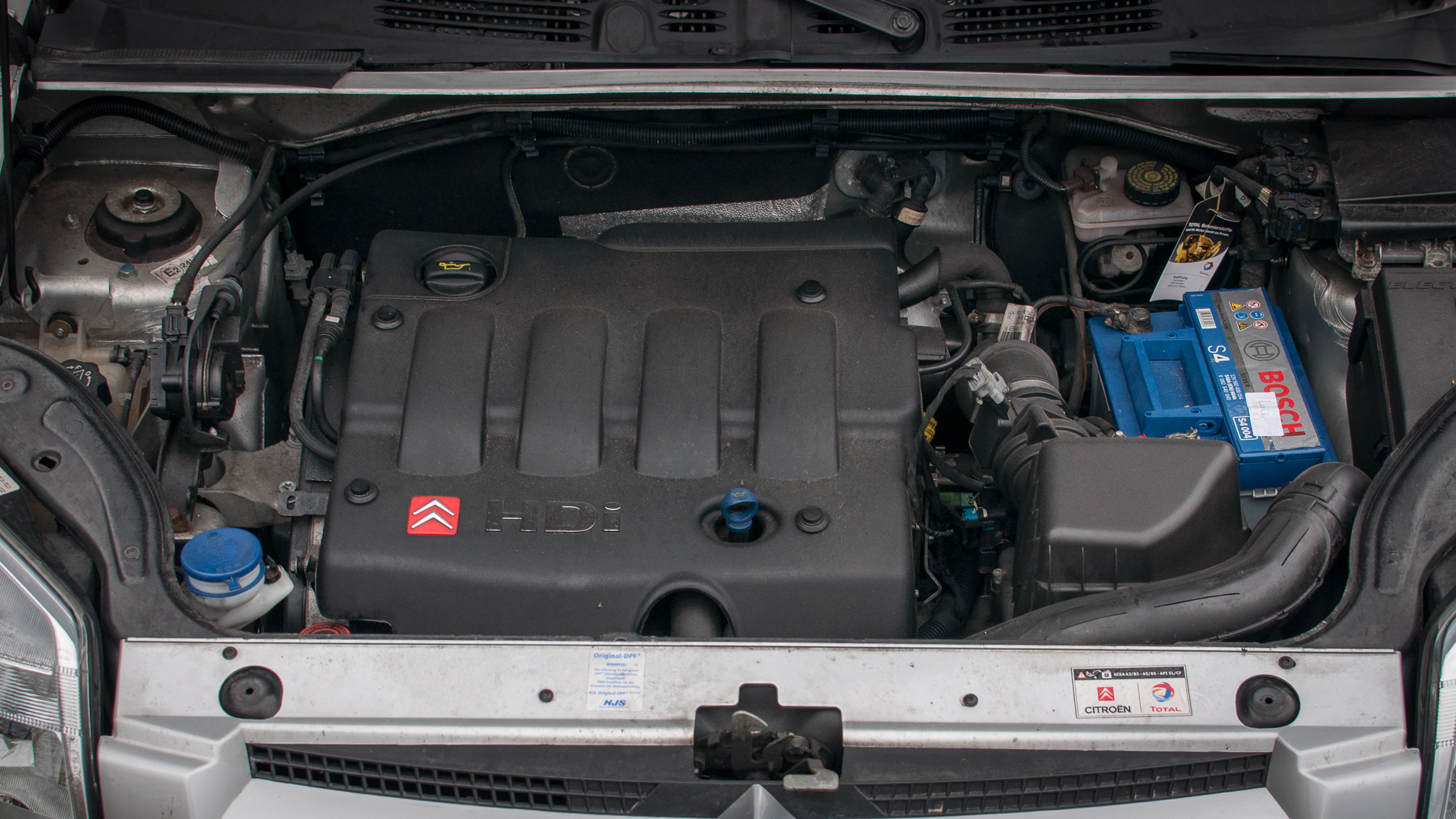

Overview
- Manufacturer: PSA Peugeot Citroën
- Production: 1998–present

Layout
- Configuration: Straight-four engine
- Displacement: 1.7 L (1,749 cc); 1.9 L (1,868 cc); 2.0 L (1,968 cc); 2.0 L (1,997 cc); 2.2 L (2,179 cc); 2.2 L (2,231 cc)
- Cylinder bore: 82.2 mm (3.24 in); 82.7 mm (3.26 in); 85 mm (3.35 in); 86 mm (3.39 in)
- Piston stroke: 81.4 mm (3.20 in); 88 mm (3.46 in); 96 mm (3.78 in)
- Valvetrain: SOHC 2 valves x cyl. DOHC 4 valves x cyl. with VVT

Combustion
- Turbocharger: Variable-geometry with intercooler (some versions)
- Fuel system: Indirect injection Common rail direct injection Gasoline direct injection MPFi
- Fuel type: Petrol, Diesel
- Cooling system: Water-cooled

Output
- Power output: 69–203 PS (51–149 kW; 68–200 hp)
- Torque output: 127–370 N⋅m (94–273 lb⋅ft)

Emissions
- Emissions target standard: Euro 3 – Euro 6
- Emissions control systems: Catalytic converter, SCR

Chronology
- Predecessor: PSA XU engine (for petrol engines); PSA XUD engine (for diesel engines); BMW M47R (for Land Rover)
- Successor: Prince engine (for petrol engines); Ingenium engine (for diesel engines Jaguar Land Rover only)

The PSA EW/DW engine is a family of straight-4 black-top automobile engines manufactured by the PSA Group for use in their Peugeot and Citroën automobiles. The EW/DW family was introduced in 1998 as a replacement for the XU engine. Some DW engines are produced as part of a joint-venture with Ford Motor Company.

The EW/DW uses many parts from the XU, most notably the crankshaft, but is built with lighter materials. The EW name is used for the petrol engines ("e" for essence) and DW for Diesel engines.

All EWs are DOHC multivalve with displacement from 1.7 to 2.2 L (1,749 to 2,231 cc). They are mainly used for large family cars and executive cars, as well as large MPVs, although the 2.0 L is also used for some hot hatch models.

The DW started with an SOHC 2-valve design between 2.0 and 2.0 L (1,968 and 1,997 cc), later receiving DOHC and four valves per cylinder upon the introduction of the 2.2 L in 2000 with the Citroën C5 and Peugeot 607. Turbocharged versions started using common rail and received the commercial designation HDi. The DW10 served as the basis for the Ford/PSA engine partnership using second generation common rail and a variable-geometry turbocharger for the first time on the 2.0 L design.

== DW8 ==
The DW8 is for all intents and purposes an evolution of the XUD9 and was the only diesel engine in the family not to feature a turbocharger or common-rail direct injection. It was mainly used in vans such as the Citroën Berlingo and Peugeot Partner but can also be found in more affordable versions of the Peugeot 206 and 306. The DW8 was phased out in 2007 as it does not pass Euro 4 emissions regulations (it is a Euro 3 engine). The DW8 is matched to the BE manual 5-speed and has 127 N⋅m (94 lb⋅ft) of torque. This is known as the 1WZ engine in Toyota vehicles.

Specifications

Displacement: 1.9 L (1,868 cc)

Valves: 8 valve, single overhead cam

Bore x Stroke: 82.2 mm × 88 mm (3.24 in × 3.46 in)

Compression Ratio: 23.0:1

Power output: 71 PS (52 kW; 70 hp)

Torque: 127 N⋅m (94 lb⋅ft) at 2500 rpm

Production Start Date: 1 June 2000

Model	Output	Notes	Application
DW8 (WJZ)	69 PS (51 kW; 68 hp)	Diesel catalyst	Citroën Berlingo, Jumpy I & II (up to OPR 09064) / Peugeot 206, 306 mk2, Partner, Expert I & II (up to OPR 09064)
DW8 B (WJX)	69 PS (51 kW; 68 hp)	Diesel catalyst	Citroën C15
DW8 B (WJY)	69 PS (51 kW; 68 hp)	Diesel catalyst	Citroën Berlingo, Jumpy I & II (since OPR 09065), Xsara / Peugeot 206, 306 mk2, Partner, Expert I & II (since OPR 09065)
Toyota 1WZ	69 PS (51 kW; 68 hp) at 4600 rpm / 125 N⋅m (92 lb⋅ft) at 2500 rpm	Diesel catalyst	2000–2001 8th Generation Toyota Corolla (Europe)

== DW10 ==
The 2.0 L DW10 was the first PSA Diesel engine to feature common rail direct injection, and was given the commercial designation HDi. It has a bore and a stroke of 85 mm × 88 mm (3.35 in × 3.46 in) for a total displacement of 2.0 L (1,997 cc), replacing the XUD9 in 1999. It was initially available in 90 PS (66 kW; 89 hp) form, with two valves per cylinder and a non-intercooled turbo. An intercooler was added later in the year, boosting power to 109 PS (80 kW; 108 hp).

Initially available in the midsized models, such as the Citroën Xsara and Xantia and Peugeot 306, 406 and Peugeot 206 it was soon spread across the PSA range, such as the LCVs, while a 16-valve version (RHW), with 109 PS (80 kW; 108 hp), was used in the large MPVs built in association with Fiat. Suzuki was a customer for these powerplants, using them in the European Vitara, Grand Vitara, and XL-7. Eurovan-based commercial vans, the Citroën Jumpy, Peugeot Expert and Fiat Scudo were available with a 94 PS (69 kW; 93 hp) DW10 BTED engine, which is essentially an intercooled version of the original 90 PS (66 kW; 89 hp) design.

The DW10 was used as the basis for the new family of Duratorq Diesel engines co-developed with Ford and Volvo it is used in the Focus, Kuga, Mondeo Mk4, Mondeo Mk5, C-Max and C30/S40/V50/C70, besides various Citroën and Peugeot passenger models. The DOHC 16-valve powerplants were mated to a second generation common rail injection system and a variable-geometry turbocharger, pushing power to 136 PS (100 kW; 134 hp) (RHR). It is fitted with a six-speed manual transmission or six-speed Aisin-automatic transmission (in Citroën C5 from summer 2004 onwards).

The DW10BTED4E5 and DW10C are Euro 5-compliant, and therefore still available for sale in Europe.

2014 Euro 6 variant DW10FC and DW10FD introduced selective catalytic reduction emissions control technology.

This engine is known as the 4WZ when installed in Toyota vehicles such as Toyotas version of the Citroën Jumpy.

Model	Output	Notes
DW10 ATED / RHS	107 PS (79 kW; 106 hp)	common rail Turbo-diesel catalyst+FAP
DW10 TD / RHY	90 PS (66 kW; 89 hp)	common rail Turbo-diesel no air/air exchanger catalyst
DW10 BTED / RHX	95 PS (70 kW; 94 hp)	
DW10 ATED / RHZ	109 PS (80 kW; 108 hp)	common rail Turbo-diesel air/air exchanger catalyst
DW10 ATED4 / RHW	109 PS (80 kW; 108 hp)	common rail Turbo-diesel 16-valve catalyst
DW10 UTED4 / RHK (Base DW10B or DW10C) see 1	120 PS (88 kW; 118 hp)	common rail Turbo-diesel 16-valve catalyst
DW10 BTED4 (E5) / RHR	141 PS (104 kW; 139 hp)	common rail Turbo-diesel 16-valve catalyst
DW10 BTED4 / RHF	140 PS (103 kW; 138 hp)	common rail Turbo-diesel 16-valve catalyst
DW10 C RHE/ RHH / RHC (on HYbrid4)	RHE: 152 PS (112 kW; 150 hp), 165 PS (121 kW; 163 hp)	common rail Turbo-diesel 16-valve catalyst
DW10 CD AHZ	130 PS (96 kW; 128 hp)	common rail Turbo-diesel 16-valve catalyst
DW10 FE / AH01 (Citroën Jumpy and its derivatives, RH02 as AH01) middle 2014	120 PS (88 kW; 118 hp)	common rail Turbo-diesel 16-valve catalyst SCR
DW10 FD 100KW / AH01	135 PS (99 kW; 133 hp)	common rail Turbo-diesel 16-valve catalyst SCR
DW10 FD / AH01	150 PS (110 kW; 148 hp)	common rail Turbo-diesel 16-valve catalyst SCR
DW10 FC / AH01, AH02	180 PS (132 kW; 178 hp)	common rail Turbo-diesel 16-valve catalyst SCR

== DW12 ==
The 2.2 L (2,179 cc) DW12 has a bore and a stroke of 85 mm × 96 mm (3.35 in × 3.78 in). Unlike the initial DW10 designs, it was fitted with 16 valves from the beginning, and made its debut in the 2000 with the Citroën C5, Peugeot 406, Peugeot 406 Coupe, and Peugeot 607, being used only in the larger models. In 2006 it was added to the PSA/Ford family, with power reaching 170 PS (125 kW; 168 hp). Peugeot added the engine as an option for the Peugeot 407 and the now facelifted 607, between the 2.0 DW10 and 2.7 DT17. Land Rover used this engine in the Freelander 2, Discovery Sport and Range Rover Evoque. Available as both 160ps or 190ps, Peugeot 4007 and Citroën C-Crosser used the same motor. The unit was used in a longitudinal mounting in the Jaguar XF from 2012 until 2015 in 163 PS or 200 PS, though some early 2012 cars were available as 190 PS. A different 2.2 L engine, Ford's ZSD-422 with a displacement of 2.2 L (2,198 cc) was used in the Citroën and Peugeot LCV range of vans.

The DW12C is a Euro 5-compliant, high-output version.

Model	Output	Notes
DW12 UTED	100 PS (74 kW; 99 hp)	common rail Turbo-diesel 8-Valve for Citroën Jumper and Peugeot Boxer vans
DW12 TED4	128–133 PS (94–98 kW; 126–131 hp)	Common rail Turbo-diesel 16-valve
DW12 BTED4	177 PS (130 kW; 175 hp)	Common rail Turbo-diesel 16-valve
DW12 C	204 PS (150 kW; 201 hp)	Common rail Turbo-diesel 16-valve
DW12 CTED4	180 CV	Common rail Turbo-diesel 16-valve for Peugeot Landtrek

The DW12 RU is an updated version that meets Euro 6d emission standards, and is intended for light commercial vehicle applications where it replaces the DW10 FU. The Citroën Jumper and Peugeot Boxer (2019–) are powered by this engine. It comes in power ratings of 120 PS/300 Nm, 140 PS/340 Nm and 165 PS/370 Nm.

=== In India ===
The DW12 engine has been manufactured in India by Tata Motors and Mahindra and Mahindra, with the same 2.2 L (2,179 cc) displacement.

Tata used DW12 in their vehicles like Tata Safari, Tata Hexa, Aria, and Xenon. They launched the engine in the 2007 Safari as the 2.2 Dicor. They continued to use it in various models until 2020 when Bharat Stage 6 emission standards forced Tata to discountinue it.

Mahindra re-engineered the engine together with AVL of Austria, calling the new generation the mHawk. It was introduced in 2009 with the Mahindra Scorpio CRDe. It is intercooled and features a variable-geometry turbocharger (VTG), delivering maximum power of 140 PS (138 bhp; 103 kW) and 320 N⋅m (236 lb⋅ft) of torque. A Bosch common-rail direct-injection system with solenoid injectors is used. The mHawk is equipped with chain-driven overhead camshafts and hydraulic lash adjusters; its compression ratio ranges from 16.5:1 to 18.5:1 depending on the model. It was then installed on the Scorpio pickup verson, and in 2012 it was carried over to the Mahindra Xylo. It has been available on the Mahindra XUV500 with a fifth generation VGT since 2011, updated to sixth generation e-VGT in 2018. In 2020 Mahindra revised the engine to meet BS6 and then BS6.2 in 2023. Called the second generation mHawk, this was launched in the Mahindra Thar, XUV700, Scorpio, and later on other models as well.

== EW7 ==
The EW7 has a bore and a stroke of 82.7 mm × 81.4 mm (3.26 in × 3.20 in), for a displacement of 1.7 L (1,749 cc). It was used as an entry-level engine for the Citroën C5 and Citroën Xsara Picasso, the Peugeot 406, and the Peugeot 407.

As of January 1, 2011 and the requirements of Euro 5 emission regulations, the EW7 (Euro 4 only) is no longer available in Europe. For most use, it was replaced by the 1.6 litre turbocharged version of the Prince engine.

Model	Code	Output	Notes
EW7 J4	6FZ	117 PS (86 kW; 115 hp)	16-valve catalyst
EW7 A	6FY	125 PS (92 kW; 123 hp)	16-valve catalyst

== EW10 ==
The EW10 has a bore and a stroke of 85 mm × 88 mm (3.35 in × 3.46 in), for a displacement of 2.0 L (1,997 cc). It is used widely throughout the PSA Group, including the Citroën C4, C5, Citroën Xsara, Citroën Xsara Picasso and Peugeot 206, 307 and 407. A gasoline direct injection variant, called EW10 D and marketed as HPi, was briefly used in the Citroën C5 and Peugeot 406 starting in 2001, but was discontinued in 2003 due to low sales.

The EW10 J4S variant is a high performance version used in the 206 GTI 180, 206 RC, 307 Féline, 307 cc and C4 VTS. Power was raised to 177 PS (130 kW; 175 hp), although the two French brands round it up to 180 PS (132 kW; 178 hp) in advertising. EW10 A is a further development of the EW10 J4, presenting somewhat higher power and torque due to the introduction of Variable valve timing (VVT). Fuel consumption is also decreased. Power is 140 PS (103 kW; 138 hp) at 6000 rpm and torque 200 N⋅m (148 lb⋅ft) at 4000 rpm. Citroën usually states 143 PS (105 kW; 141 hp) and Peugeot 140 PS for the same 140 PS (103 kW; 138 hp) engine.

As of January 1, 2010 and the requirements of Euro 5 emission regulations, the EW10 (Euro 4 only) is no longer available in Europe. For most use, it is replaced by the 1.6 litre turbocharged version partially based on the Prince engine.

Model	Code	Output	Notes
EW10 D	RLZ	140 PS (103 kW; 138 hp)	Gasoline direct injection catalyst
EW10 J4	RFN	136 PS (100 kW; 134 hp)	16-valve catalyst
EW10 J4	RFR	135 PS (99 kW; 133 hp)	16-valve catalyst
EW10 J4S	RFK	177 PS (130 kW; 175 hp)	16-valve VVT catalyst
EW10 A	RFJ	143 PS (105 kW; 141 hp)	16-valve VVT catalyst

== EW12 ==
The EW12 was introduced to replace the low-pressure turbo variant of the XU10. It has a bore and stroke of 86 mm × 96 mm (3.39 in × 3.78 in), for a displacement of 2.2 L (2,231 cc). Citroën only uses it on the C8 MPV, while Peugeot, which has more a sporty image, uses it in the 406 SRi and 406 Coupe, 407, the 607 executive model and 807 MPV.

As of January 1, 2011 and the requirements of Euro 5 emission regulations, the EW12 (Euro 4 only) is no longer available in Europe. It was replaced by the 1.6 litre turbocharged Prince engine.

Model	Code	Output	Notes
EW12 J4	3FZ	158 PS (116 kW; 156 hp)	16-valve catalyst
EW12 J4	3FY	163 PS (120 kW; 161 hp)	16-valve catalyst

== See also ==
- List of PSA engines
- Ford Duratorq engine
- PSA HDi engine
