= PSA XUD engine =

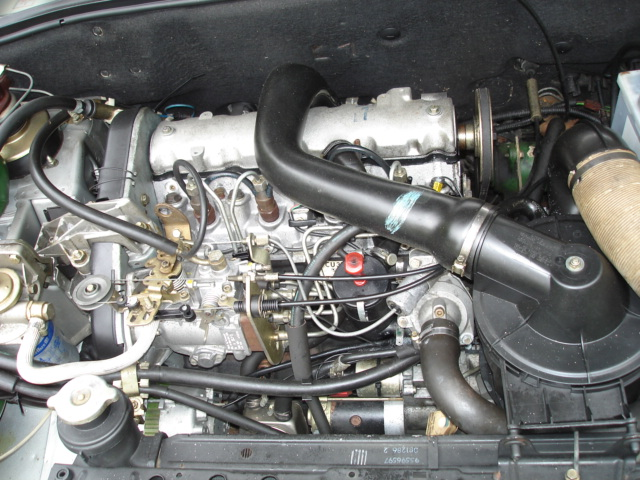
- XUD9 in a Citroën BX TRD

Overview
- Manufacturer: PSA
- Production: 1982–2005

Layout
- Configuration: Inline-4
- Displacement: 1.8 L (1,769 cc); 1.9 L (1,905 cc); 2.1 L (2,088 cc); 2.1 L (2,138 cc)
- Cylinder bore: 80 mm (3.15 in); 83 mm (3.27 in); 85 mm (3.35 in); 86 mm (3.39 in)
- Piston stroke: 88 mm (3.46 in); 92 mm (3.62 in)
- Valvetrain: SOHC 2 valves x cyl. or 3 valves x cyl.

Combustion
- Turbocharger: With intercooler (some versions)
- Fuel system: Indirect injection
- Management: Lucas, Bosch
- Fuel type: Diesel
- Cooling system: Water-cooled

Output
- Power output: 60–110 PS (44–81 kW; 59–108 hp)

Dimensions
- Dry weight: 157 kg (346 lb)

Emissions
- Emissions control systems: Catalytic converter

Chronology
- Successor: PSA EW/DW engine

The PSA XUD is a diesel engine designed and built by PSA — Peugeot and Citroën. It is an Indirect injection (IDI) engine, that uses a version of the Ricardo Consulting Engineers Ricardo Comet V prechamber cylinder head design. The engine comes in 1.8 L (1,769 cc), 1.9 L (1,905 cc), and 2.1-liter displacements. The 2.1 has 12 valves, all displacements were built either naturally aspirated or turbocharged. The XUD was the predecessor to the HDI range of engines. Early HDi Engines were a PSA design, later 16-valve engines were jointly developed with Ford.

== Design ==
The XUD was available with either SOHC 8-valve or 12-valve heads. It was mainly applied transversally in front wheel drive vehicles, tilted by 30°. However, some applications in non-PSA vehicles had the engine installed longitudinally, with rear-wheel drive. The XUD is built in Citroën's plant in Trémery, near Metz.

Displacement ranges between 1.8 and 2.1 L (1,769 and 2,138 cc), and all XU diesel engines have a stroke of either 88 or 92 mm (3.46 or 3.62 in). The former was shared with the XU9. Bore sizes range from 80 to 86 mm (3.15 to 3.39 in), some of which are also shared with other XU engines.

Upon its release the engine was noted as one of the best diesel engines (for cars and light vans) in the world with its high power output and refinement it made all other diesel engines seem agricultural. It was also particularly light, with a ready-to-run XUD9 weighing 157 kg (346 lb), 15% less than a comparable diesel of the previous generation.

=== Vegetable oil fuel ===
The engine, because it is indirect injection, with a slower combustion burn time than direct injection, is suitable to run on SVO (pure vegetable oil). A feature of the Ricardo Comet pre-chamber design is that it makes the engine tolerant of low Cetane value fuels such as SVO. The viscosity of vegetable oil when cold is too great for rotary injection pumps, (in particular the weaker Lucas CAV pump, the Bosch VE fuel pump is superior), preventing it from acting as a lubricant and increasing the workload on the distributor/rotary injection pump and damaging it. The Lucas EPIC pump fitted to the 2.1 L 12 valve turbo-diesel engine after 1995 is the weakest pump of all.

== XUD7 ==
The XUD7 has a displacement of 1.8 L (1,769 cc), with a bore and a stroke of 80 mm × 88 mm (3.15 in × 3.46 in). Output is 60 PS (44 kW; 59 hp) for the naturally aspirated version or 78 PS (57 kW; 77 hp) for the turbocharged model. An intercooled turbocharged version was introduced later, with 90 PS (66 kW; 89 hp) on tap. All are Diesel engines.

Model	Output	Notes	Model of car
XUD7 T/K	78 PS (57 kW; 77 hp)	Turbo	Peugeot 205 Dturbo, Peugeot 309 XRDT/GRDT/SRDTurbo/GRX DT
XUD7 TE	90 PS (66 kW; 89 hp)	Turbo with intercooler	Citroën BX TRD/TZD Turbo, Peugeot 405 Turbo, Honda Concerto TD, Rover 200 MK2 TD
XUD7/K	60 PS (44 kW; 59 hp)		Citroën C15D, Citroën BX RD, Peugeot 205, Citroën Xsara, Citroën Visa
XUD7/Z	60 PS (44 kW; 59 hp)	catalyst	

== XUD9 ==
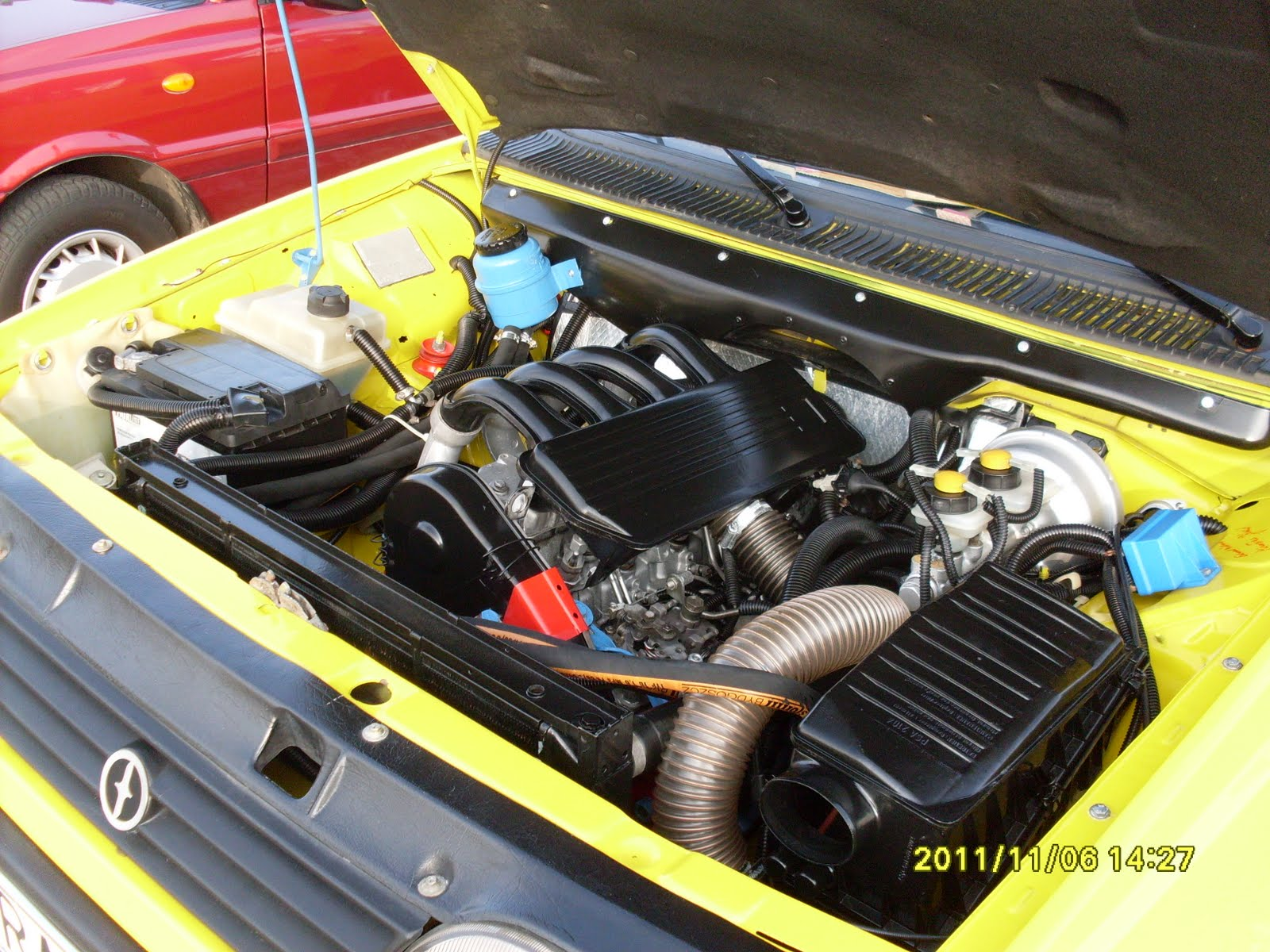
XUD9A engine in FSO Polonez Caro

The XUD9 has a displacement of 1.9 L (1,905 cc), with a bore and a stroke of 83 mm × 88 mm (3.27 in × 3.46 in). Both turbocharged and naturally aspirated versions were produced. Most turbocharged versions feature an intercooler, although a limited number of installations in the Citroën Xantia featured a Turbocharger without intercooler. Both engines also featured either a Bosch or a Lucas mechanical fuel pump and injectors. The engine version with the Bosch pump is known to have been run with vegetable oil. The original XUD9 engine is known as the "square port" engine, as its cylinder head has square exhaust ports. Later (and noticeably improved) XUD9A engines have oval ports.

PSA Group licensed a modified version of the naturally aspirated version of the engine with a catalytic converter designated the XUD9/Z to Hyundai which was rated at 50kw. It was used in the European specification of the Lantra (1996–1999).

Model	Output	Notes	Model of car
XUD9	65 PS (48 kW; 64 hp)	Diesel	Citroën BX, Peugeot 205 (export), Peugeot 305, Peugeot 309, Talbot Horizon, Talbot 1510 (Finland only)
XUD9 A	71 PS (52 kW; 70 hp)	Diesel	Rover 200; Citroën Berlingo; FSO Polonez; Citroën BX; Lada Niva; LDV Pilot
XUD9 TE/L	92 PS (68 kW; 91 hp)	Diesel turbo with intercooler	Citroën ZX; Citroën Xsara; Citroën Jumpy; Peugeot 306; Peugeot 405; Peugeot Expert
XUD9 SD	63 PS (46 kW; 62 hp)	Diesel turbo catalyst	Suzuki Samurai
XUD9 SD	75 PS (55 kW; 74 hp)	Diesel turbo catalyst	Citroën Xantia; Suzuki Baleno; Lada Niva
XUD9 TE/Y	90 PS (66 kW; 89 hp)	Diesel turbo with intercooler catalyst	Peugeot 406; Citroën Xantia Citroën ZX
XUD9/Z	68 PS (50 kW; 67 hp)	Diesel catalyst	Hyundai Lantra

== XUD11 ==
The XUD11 was available in two displacements:

- 2.1 L (2,138 cc) — XUD11 A naturally aspirated
- 2.1 L (2,088 cc) — XUD11 ATE/BTE turbocharged

Both were 12-valve SOHC engines with a 92 mm (3.62 in) stroke. The naturally aspirated XUD11 A was bored to 86 mm (3.39 in) for a total displacement of 2.1 L (2,138 cc), while the turbocharged ATE/BTE versions were reduced in bore to 85 mm (3.35 in) for a total of 2.1 L (2,088 cc). The BTE engines used a Lucas EPIC (Electronically Programmed Injection Control) fuel pump, whereas the ATE engines used a Bosch injection pump with a throttle cable.

Model	Output	Notes	Model of car
XUD11 A	83 PS (61 kW; 82 hp)	Diesel 12-valve SOHC	Citroën XM, Peugeot 605
XUD11 ATE	110 PS (81 kW; 108 hp)	Diesel 12-valve SOHC turbo	Citroën XM
XUD11 BTE	110 PS (81 kW; 108 hp)	Diesel 12-valve SOHC turbo catalyst	Peugeot 406, Peugeot 605, Citroën Xantia

== Vehicles ==
The engine has been installed into the following vehicles:

- Auverland A3
- Citroën BX
- Citroën Visa
- Citroën C15
- Citroën ZX
- Citroën Xsara
- Citroën Berlingo
- Citroën Xantia
- Citroën XM
- Eurovan (PSA/Fiat joint venture) Sevel Nord
  - Citroën Evasion/Synergie/C8
  - Citroën Jumpy (Dispatch in UK)
  - Fiat Ulysse
  - Fiat Scudo
  - Peugeot 806/807
  - Peugeot Expert
  - Lancia Zeta/Phedra
- Sevel Sud — Larger Panel Van PSA/Fiat Ducato joint venture
  - Citroën C25
  - Citroën Jumper (Relay in UK)
  - Peugeot J5 (Talbot Express in UK)
  - Peugeot Boxer
- FSO Polonez/Caro
- Honda Concerto (badge engineered Rover 200 diesel for European market)
- Hyundai Lantra
- Lada Niva
- LDV 200/Pilot
- Peugeot 205
- Peugeot 305
- Peugeot 306
- Peugeot 309
- Peugeot 405
- Peugeot 406
- Peugeot 605
- Peugeot Partner
- Suzuki Baleno
- Suzuki Samurai (Santana)
- Suzuki Vitara (Santana)
- Talbot Horizon
- Tata Telcoline / Tata Telcosport
- Rover 200
- Rover 400
- Toyota Corolla
- UMM Alter 2000
