= Citroën XM =

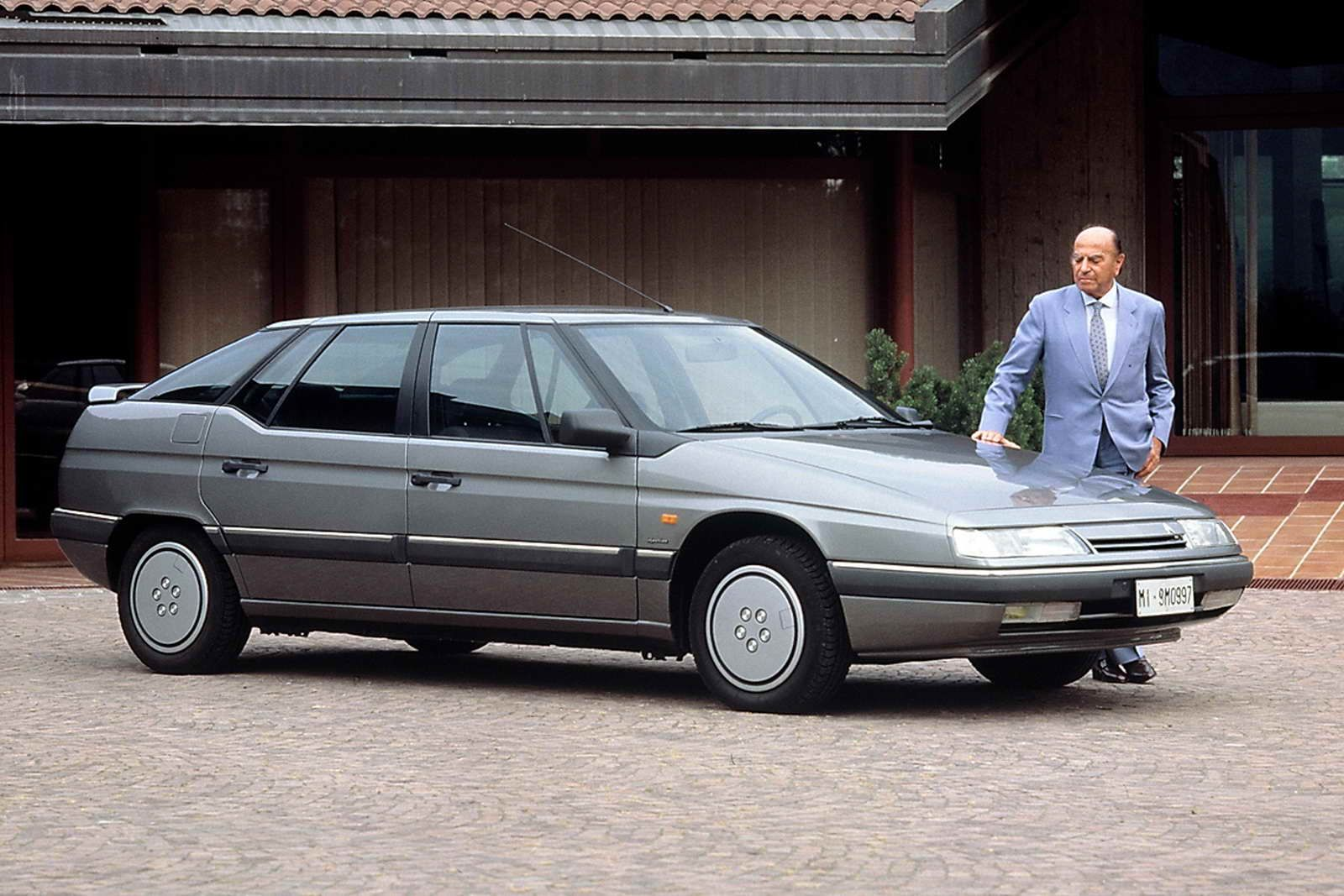
- Nuccio Bertone, alongside an XM

Overview
- Manufacturer: Citroën (PSA Group)
- Also called: Fengshen Citroën XM (China)
- Production: 1989–2000; 333,405 built
- Assembly: France: Rennes (Rennes Plant); France: Cerizay (Heuliez: XM Break)
- Designer: Bertone under Marc Deschamps

Body and chassis
- Class: Mid-size luxury / Executive car (E)
- Body style: 5-door liftback 5-door station wagon
- Layout: FF layout
- Related: Peugeot 605

Powertrain
- Engine: Petrol: 2.0 L XU10 I4; 2.0 L XU10 J4R DOHC 16V I4; 2.0 L XU10 J2TE turbo I4; 2.9 L ESL DOHC 24V V6; 3.0 L PRV V6; 3.0 L PRV 24V V6; Diesel: 2.1 L XUD11 A 12V I4; 2.1 L XUD11 12V turbo I4; 2.5 L DK5 12V turbo I4

Dimensions
- Wheelbase: 2,850 mm (112.2 in)
- Length: hatchback: 4,708 mm (185.4 in) station wagon: 4,963 mm (195.4 in); 1998–2000 station wagon: 4,950 mm (194.9 in)
- Width: hatchback: 1,793 mm (70.6 in) station wagon: 1,794 mm (70.6 in)
- Height: 1,392 mm (54.8 in) (most Berline models); some turbo models 1,385 mm (54.5 in); 1,466 mm (57.7 in) (1998 V6 Break)
- Curb weight: 1,310 kg (2,888 lb)-1,550 kg (3,417 lb)

Chronology
- Predecessor: Citroën CX
- Successor: Citroën C6 (V6 Engine); Citroën C5 (I4 Engine)

The Citroën XM is an executive car manufactured and marketed by Citroën from 1989 to 2000. Voted 1990 European Car of the Year for its contributions in terms of design and technological innovation, it was the first production automobile in the world to be equipped with electronically controlled hydropneumatic suspension.

With a minor facelift in 1994, XM production reached 333,405 over the course of 11 years.

== History ==
Launched on 23 May 1989, the XM was the company's flagship saloon, replacing the Citroën CX. It went on sale in its native France immediately afterwards, and was available in right-hand drive on the UK market from October 1989. The CX Break and Familiale remained in production until the spring of 1991, when the XM Estate launched.

The XM did not enjoy the commercial success of its predecessors, the CX and the DS, which each raised the bar of automotive performance for other manufacturers. By the second half of the 1990s, sales were in sharp decline, and Citroën ended production in 2000. Total sales of the XM reached 333,405 in 11 years, of which 31,035 were of the Heuliez-built Breaks (estates). The XM's replacement, the Citroën C6, was launched at the end of 2005.

In 2021, the company ceded use of the name to BMW for their BMW XM SUV.

=== Design advances ===
The XM had electronic management of its suspension; a partially galvanised body shell and the option of a 3.0 L V6 engine.

The rear passengers were seated higher than those in the front in order to afford a good view. To improve rear passenger comfort when the large rear hatch was opened, some models had an additional, interior rear window. The XM shared a floorpan with the Peugeot 605, and the two models fared similarly in both teething problems and market acceptance.

=== Competition ===
The XM was intended to compete against prestige vehicles like the Mercedes-Benz W124, Audi 100 and BMW's 5 Series in a sector that accounted for 14.2% of the European market. It also competed with cars from mainstream brands including the Ford Scorpio and Opel Omega. Citroën was quoted as saying that the car was supposed to "take what Citroën means and make it acceptable". The car's initial reception was positive. Some six months after its launch, the XM won the prestigious European Car of the Year award for 1990 (gaining almost twice as many votes as the second, the Mercedes-Benz SL) and went on to win a further 14 major awards within a year of its launch.

The anticipated annual sales of 450 cars a day in the first full year of production, or 160,000 units a year, never materialized. Sales never reached this ambitious level (higher than even its popular predecessor) for a variety of reasons. Like the CX, the XM did not have the worldwide distribution of competitors from BMW, Audi, and Mercedes-Benz. Also, it was launched only a year before a major global recession began, impacting negatively on car sales across the world; a notable example being the UK, where more than 2.3 million new cars were registered in 1989, but that figure fell to less than 1.6 million in 1991 (a drop of more than 30% in just two years). In Japan the XM was sold through Mazda's Eunos dealership chain, part of an effort to minimize the appearance of Japan's automobile market being closed to imports. It was also offered by Citroën's traditional importer Seibu Motor, who kept selling the XM by themselves after the Eunos brand was discontinued in 1996.

The market for executive cars made by volume manufacturers (Ford, Opel, etc.) was on the verge of decline as customers opted for offerings from more prestigious marques, a trend which saw Ford pull out of this market sector in 1998 and Opel/Vauxhall in 2003. Customers were placing a higher priority on speed and handling rather than ride comfort which was Citroën's specialty. The XM was underdeveloped at launch which resulted in reliability problems; the vehicle as designed was inconsistent in its abilities. The XM's styling was also controversial and alienated those who desired a more conventional three box sedan. The XM's sister car, the Peugeot 605, also proved a weak seller. Most subjective of all was the matter of the XM not living up to the expectations created by its forerunner the Citroën CX, despite that car having been launched in an era of national markets, of different demands and standards, an era when there was more scope for large advances in engineering and design than were possible in 1989.

Export markets experienced lower sales from the outset, partly due to the XM's pricing. The least expensive XM was nearly 50% more expensive at the time of launch than the corresponding CX. Whilst strong at first home market sales also declined, after the mechanical issues of the first few model years became known.

By early 1993, the XM was viewed as an "underachiever". Initial sales in the UK were at 3,500 units a year, making it Citroën's weakest seller. The 2.0-litre petrol engined variants were viewed as being the least competitive. As a result, Citroën restructured the range such that all but the base model petrols were fitted with low-inertia Garret turbochargers to add an extra 15 bhp (11 kW). This made the cars more powerful than more expensive competitors such as the Rover 820, Vauxhall Carlton and Ford Granada 2.0 GLX.

After a run of 11 years, production ended in June 2000. By 1998, Citroën had confirmed that it would soon be discontinuing the XM and replacing it with an all-new model. At the Geneva Motor Show in March 1999, it unveiled the C6 Lignage concept car, which was scheduled for launch in 2001. In the event, the XM's successor - the Citroën C6 - did not go on sale until late 2005 and was even less successful.

=== Resale value ===
XM suffered from poor resale value, which affected sales of new cars.

Quentin Willson predicted in 1990 that the XM's residuals would be better than the outgoing CX by the end of the car's life, its resale value was far below average, further denting the car's appeal.

By the mid-1990s, it was apparent that the XM's image meant it was less desirable than German products such as the BMW 5 Series. The view of the XM as commercially unsuccessful is reported by Compucars, the used car website, along with numerous other period commentaries.

=== Facelift ===
In mid-1994, the XM received a minor facelift with revisions including a driver's airbag (ending the single-spoke steering wheel), belt-pretensioners, a redesigned dashboard and upper door casings. The suspension was redesigned to reduce roll, pitch and dive and the design incorporated a passive rear-steering system similar to that on the Citroën Xantia. Power from the turbocharged engines increased to 150 PS (110 kW; 148 hp) from 145 PS (107 kW; 143 hp) at 4400 rpm.

In the United Kingdom, demand slowed significantly by the late 1990s.

== Styling ==
The angular Bertone design was a development of Marcello Gandini's Citroën BX concept. Citroën's design chief, Art Blakeslee, believed "the XM is a modern and dynamic shape, with unique styling elements such as the very long, low hood, the extensive use of glass and the kick-up in the belt line". Another Citroën designer, Daniel Abramson, explained: "We lowered the belt line to give the shape a stronger image. It is purely a 'design statement' that is not functional and does nothing for the aerodynamics of the vehicle. We wanted a car that looks good from every angle". Abramson is also reported as saying that they "picked three areas to emphasise: 1) A very aggressive look ("Almost sinister"), 2) Lots of glass to create a greenhouse effect, and 3) An aerodynamic accent based on fact (low drag).

In 2013 Car magazine described the XM as one of Bertone's seven most significant designs.

The standard 5-door models were called "Berline". The XM was also available as a "Break" (station wagon) – and in France, Tissier continued a tradition begun with the DS and CX, converting many to be used as ambulances and specialised delivery vehicles including their distinctive twin rear-axle conversions.

When introduced, lower-end and upper-end models looked largely identical. The main difference was in wheel design, while the most expensive models also received colour-coded rear view mirrors.

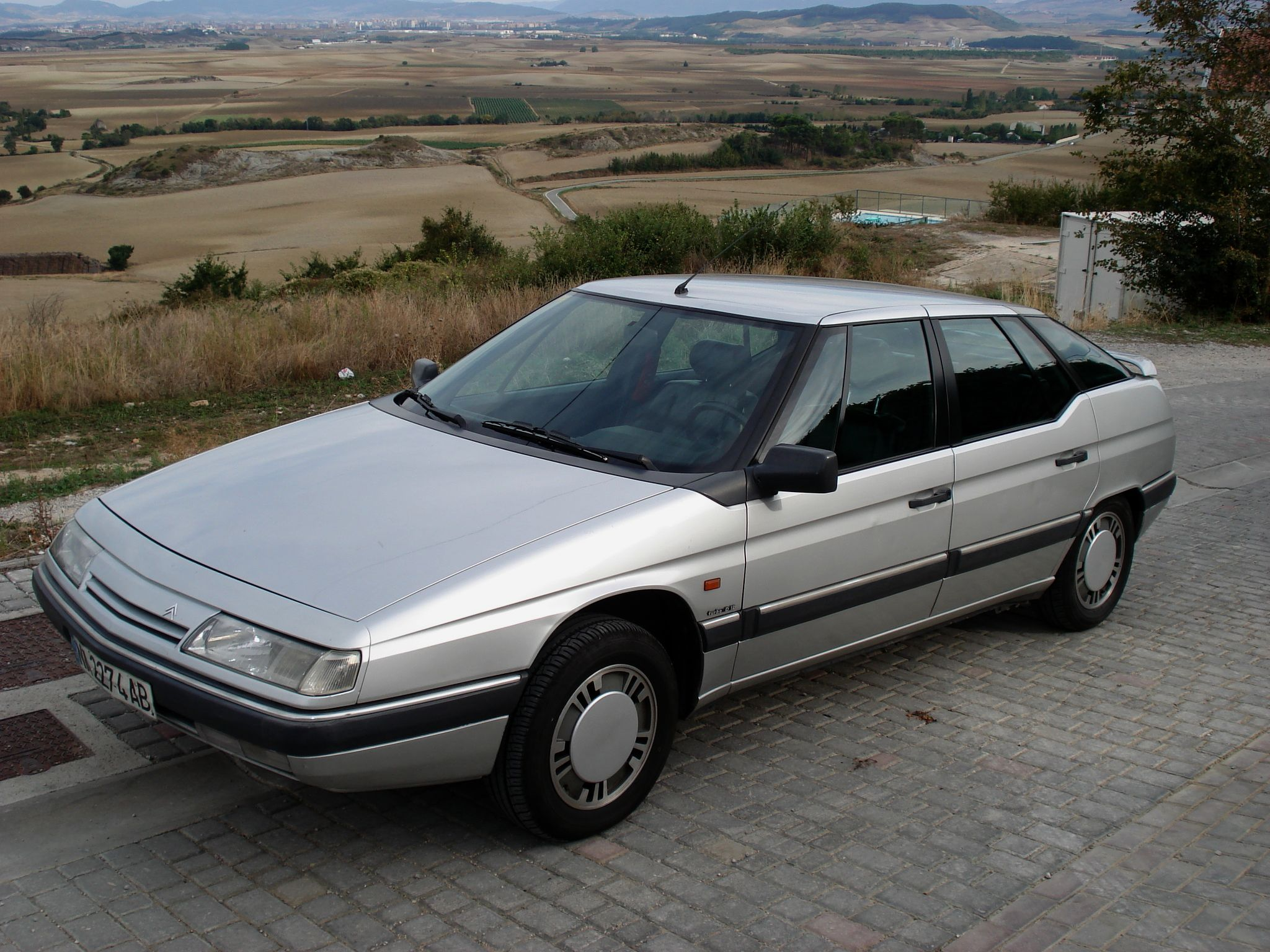
Hatchback (pre-facelift)

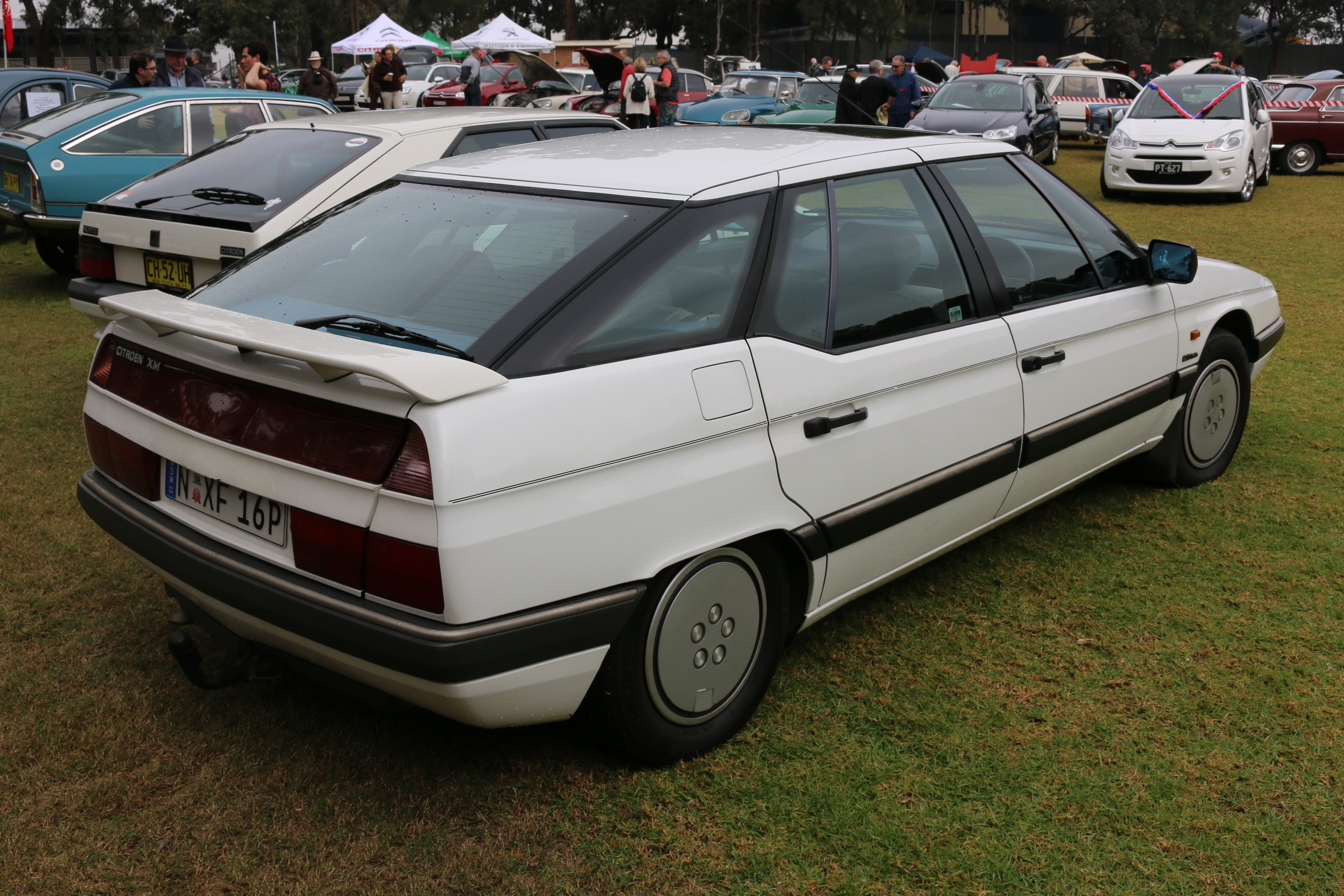
Hatchback (rear)

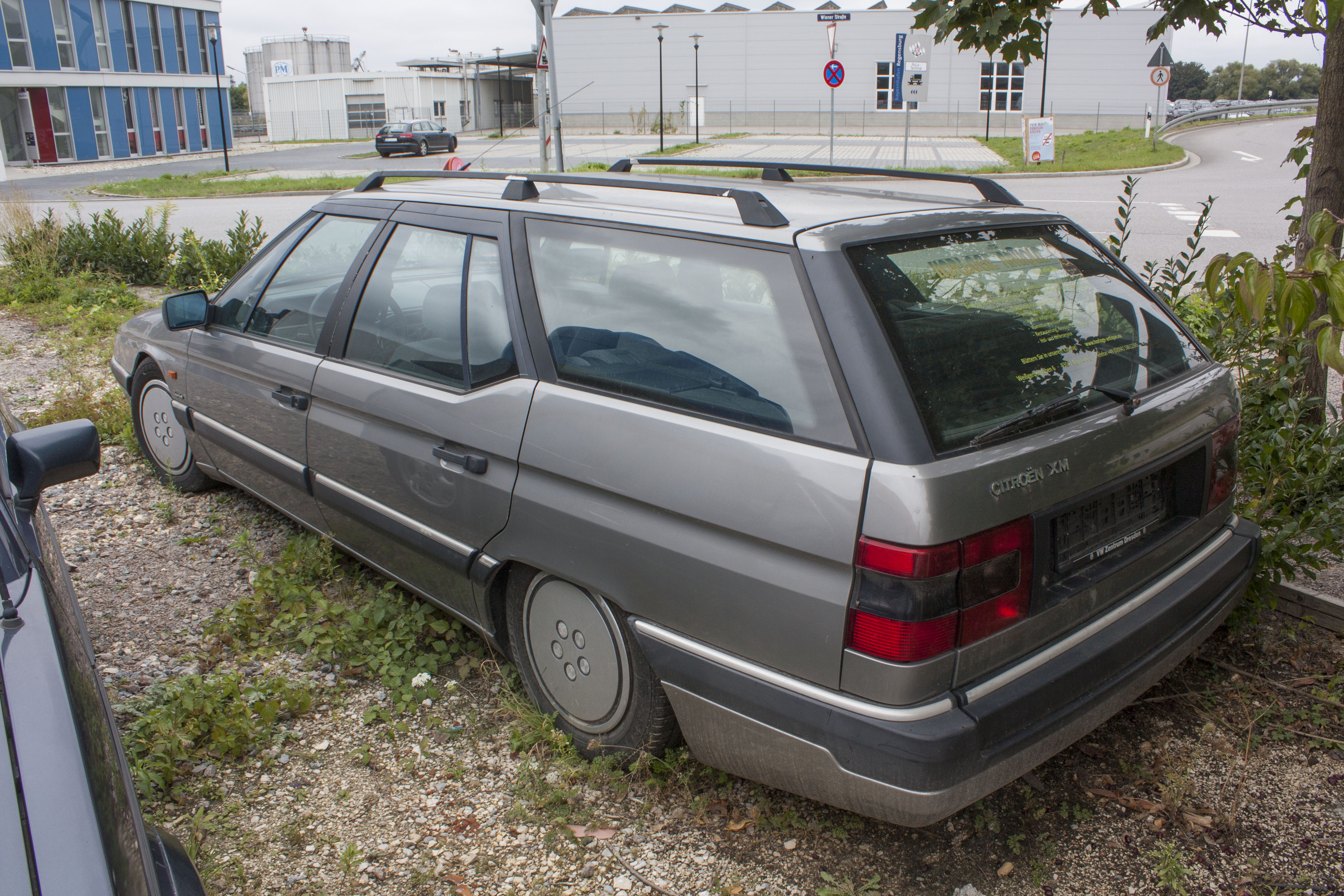
Break (pre-facelift)

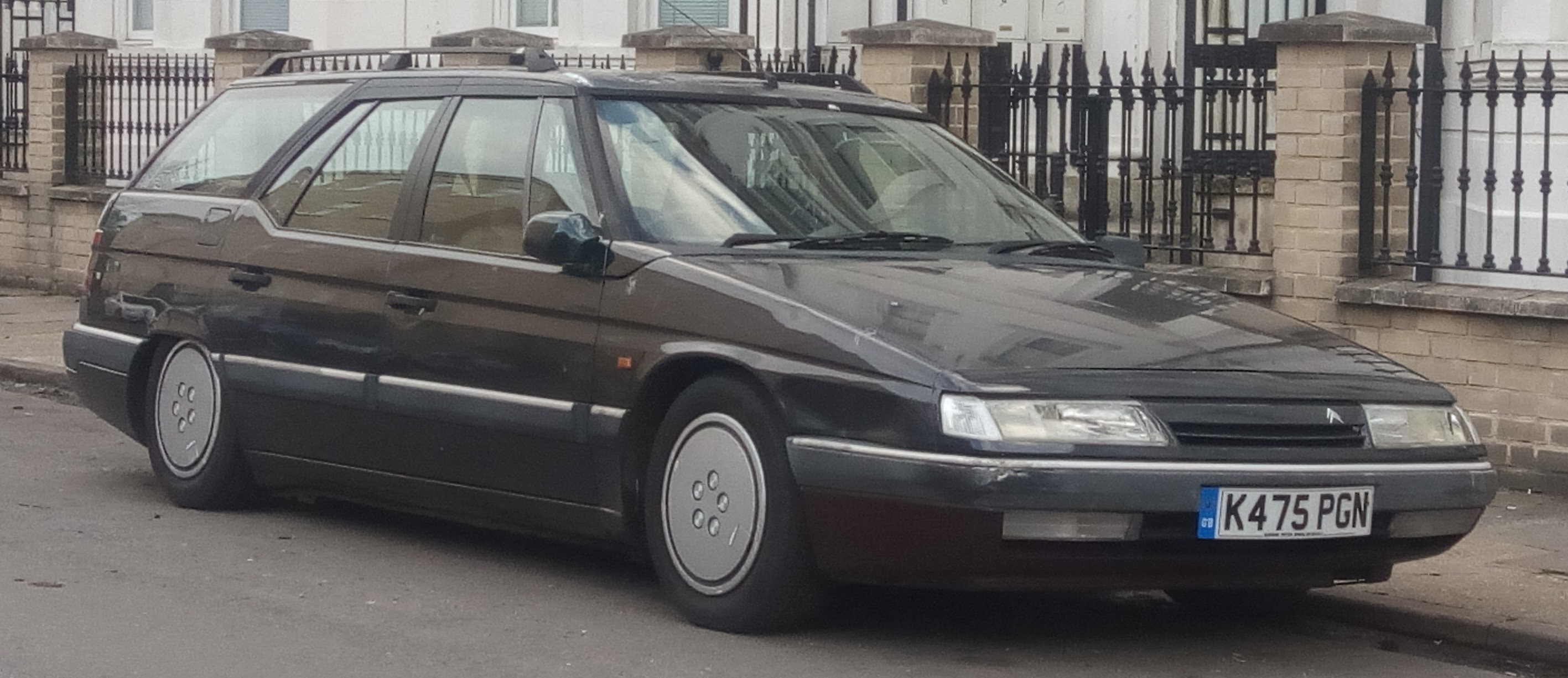
Break (pre-facelift)

=== Second series ===
Although not an official variant XMs produced around 1992/1993 have been termed series 1.5 cars due to the mix of newer technology (developed for the series 2) with the series 1 vehicle type. One example of this being the alterations to the "Hydractive" suspension system on such cars. Early vehicles (series 1) had a system that could be switched from 'Comfort' to 'Sport' mode, this did exactly what you would expect and firmed up the suspension on flicking the switch but this made for a harsh ride which Citroën owners don't like. So Citroën developed "Hydractive 2" suspension (for series 2 vehicles) that although in essence was the same it worked differently, it still had to two states 'hard' and 'soft' but the switching was controlled differently. In general smooth gentle driving the suspension would be in 'soft' mode ("Normal" mode according to Citroën on series 2 vehicles) which utilized all 6 suspension spheres and allowed 'crossflow' of fluid from side to side producing the characteristic wafting ride, but as soon as the suspension ECU sensed a large or sudden change in one of the sensors it would put the suspension into 'hard' mode locking out the extra centre spheres and stopping the 'crossflow' of fluid, this dramatically firmed up the suspension and cut body roll, as soon as the vehicle stabilized the ECU would switch the suspension system back into 'soft' mode. This is the basis of "Hydractive 2", a soft cosseting ride all the time unless the conditions demand otherwise, switching a "Hydractive 2" vehicle into "Sport" mode doesn't just switch out the extra spheres as with "Hydractive 1", it simply just narrows the parameters that cause the suspension to go into 'hard' mode and keeps the suspension in that mode for longer before defaulting back to 'soft' mode. So a series 1.5 vehicle has the styling of a series 1 but with some of the suspension refinements of the series 2 vehicles. There are other detail changes to the actual implementation of the "Hydractive" but unless you are maintaining the vehicle yourself these are unimportant.

There are a number of visible differences between the first series (May 1989 – May 1994) and second series (June 1994 – June 2000) cars, including:

- In second generation XMs, the Citroën double-chevron logo was moved to the centre of the grille and became larger. It was located off-centre in the first generation cars.
- The "XM" badge on the rear had a more stylised font (like that on the Xantia) and it was moved to the right of the tailgate.
- The second generation cars were fitted with a lower rear spoiler on the tailgate, sitting much closer to the top of the boot.
- The grey/black panel between the leading edge of the windscreen and the rear edge of the bonnet was colour-coded with the body colour. The original colouring was designed to echo the upward kick in the window line behind the rear door. With body coloured plastic this visual relationship became less clear and the "visual mass" of the front of the car increased somewhat. This effect was clearer on light coloured cars where the contrast between the dark areas and light areas was more pronounced.
- The door mirrors were modified to improve the view of the passenger side mirror from the driver's seat. Previously it was slightly obscured by the A-pillar. However, the obscuration only affected the field of view above the road horizon which is relatively less important.

Differences to the interior include:

- A more conventional four-spoke steering wheel including an integrated airbag. The driver airbag was standard on most models and countries, regardless of hand-drive configuration. As a result, the second generation models never had Citroën's distinctive single-spoke wheel. In certain markets (mainly the UK) and for certain models, XMs of the first generation were fitted with a two-spoke wheel after mid-1992.
- A modified instrument panel, to accommodate an optional passenger airbag (standard after December 1995). Also, in 1997, front seat-mounted side airbags were added, which were optional or standard depending on model and market. The design was similar to the Xantia's dashboard.
- The quality of the interior materials was marginally improved, with the leather and the seating being both softer but more supportive.
- The upper part of door trim were redesigned to soften the shape. Series 1 cars had a pronounced chamfer-effect in keeping with the angular theme of the dashboard.
- The driver and all passengers comfort was further enhanced (on Exclusive models) by variable heat seating, rather than as before just "on or off", with a dial switch allowing a heat setting of 1, 2, or 3.

Other major improvements include:

- Better, more reliable electrics and a faster computer system controlling the new Hydractive 2 suspension.
- Some models also received the "Auto Adaptive" gearbox, which supposedly assesses the driver's driving style, then switches to the most appropriate of approximately six onboard programmes. This gearbox was further enhanced by a "Sport" mode button (in addition to the sports button for the suspension), which shortened the gear change times, therefore offering a more responsive experience. The final new upgrade affecting the driving experience saw the introduction of a "Snow Mode" button, located next to the new sport mode button. Although rarely used in some countries, this was a surprisingly effective addition to the driver's arsenal; during any notable falls of snow that may affect the road ahead, a simple push of this button commands the gearbox to only accelerate from 2nd gear and up, and not to rev the engine too high, thus preventing any loss of traction.

In addition, the following changes were made to make the car easier to accept by more mainstream car buyers:

- As a direct consequence of their high pressure hydraulics, early XM brake pedals had very little, if any, travel. Phase 2 XMs had some sponginess deliberately built into the braking system (by inserting a sleeved spring into the pedal linkage) to make their brakes feel more like those on other cars.
- The Phase 2 "Hydractive 2" cars no longer "settled" down to the bottom of their suspension travel after having been parked for a while; this feature was termed "Anti-Sink" by Citroën. Such systems have even more complex hydraulics than 'Sinkers' because of the use of isolating valves and an extra sphere near the rear 'axle'. The hydraulic systems were also a lot quieter when maneuvering; this was due to the changes the "Anti-Sink" system brought. Early cars, 'sinkers', had a single output hydraulic pump which had its output divided into separate circuits, one for the power steering and one for the suspension/brake circuits (power steering needs a large flow rate whereas the suspension/brakes doesn't). The device which does this job is called a FDV (Flow Diverter Value), and this device hisses noticeably when the car is standing still or maneuvering. A slight pull on the steering wheel or a blip of the throttle will stop the hiss for a few seconds or so. Later "Anti-Sink" cars have a dual output pump, referred to as a 6+2 pump due to the number of internal piston chambers. Such cars therefore have no need of the "FDV" and therefore do not hiss.
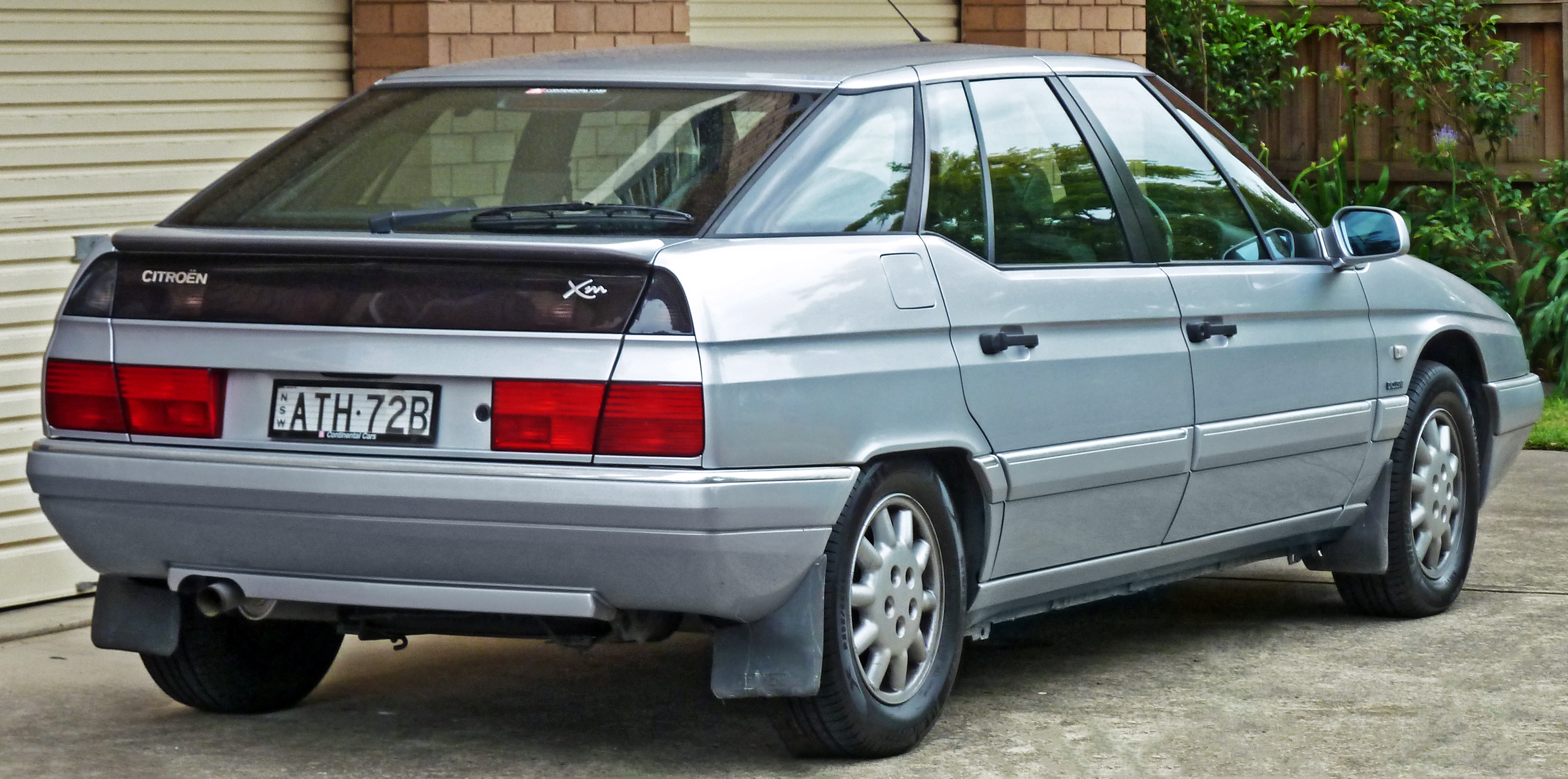
Hatchback (facelift)

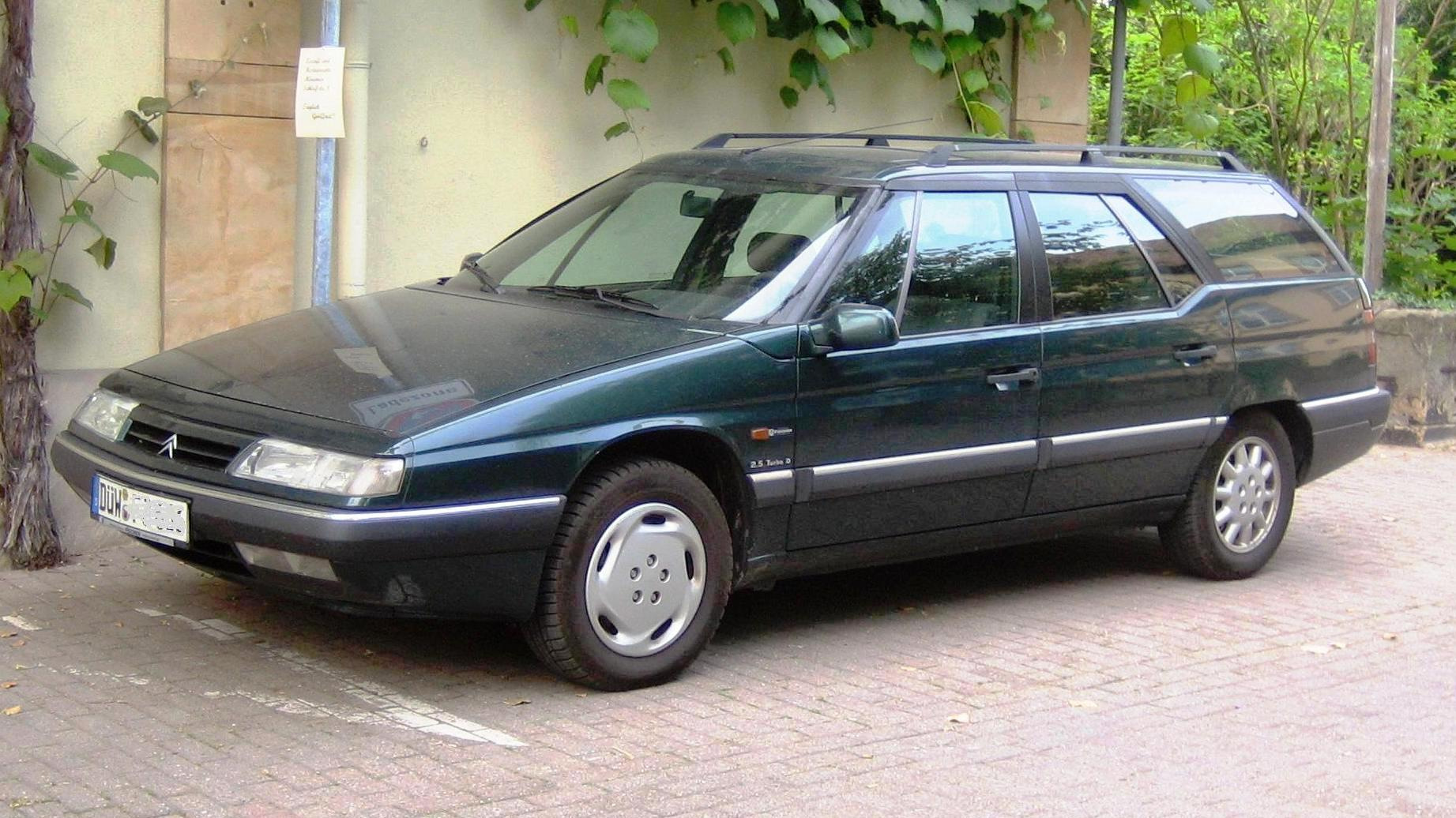
Break (facelift)

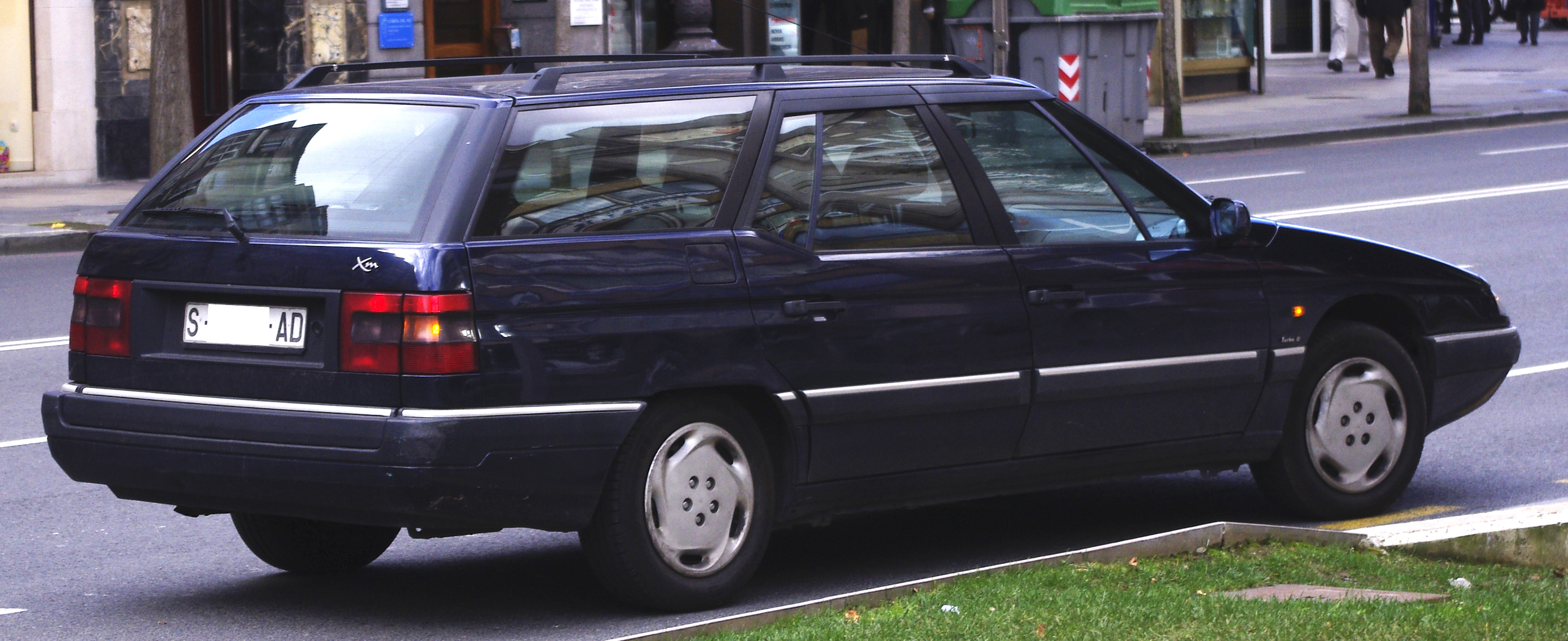
Break (facelift)

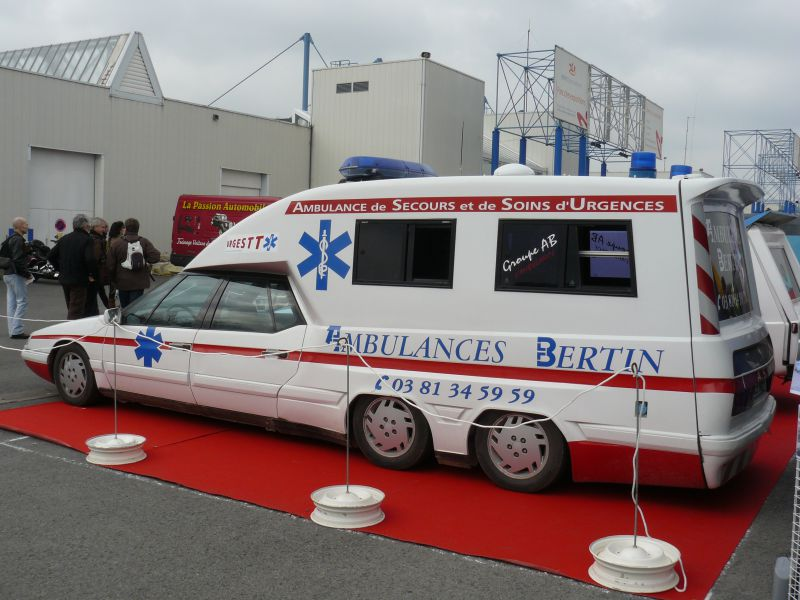
Citroën XM twin rear-axle ambulance by Tissier

== Chassis ==
=== Suspension ===
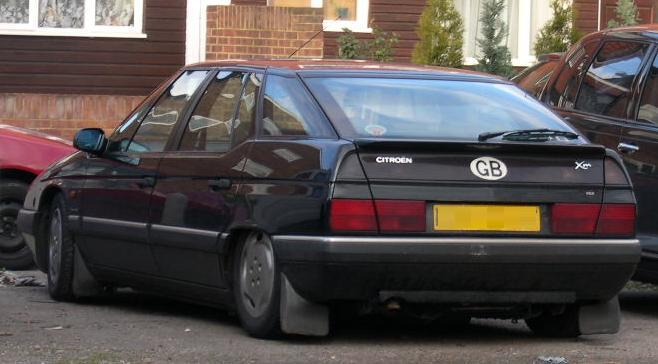
1994–2000 Citroën XM (suspension fully lowered)

The hydropneumatic self-leveling suspension used grapefruit-sized metal spheres containing nitrogen acting as both springs and shock absorbers, along with an electronic control system marketed as Hydractive. Sensors in the steering, brakes, suspension, throttle pedal and transmission transmitted car's speed, acceleration, and road conditions to on-board computers to control the ride. The chassis needed very few modifications to handle nearly double the power in the V6 24V compared to the lowest-end models; the only difference was a somewhat sturdier rear stabiliser bar.

The Hydractive system was somewhat "ahead of the curve" when the car was launched and early versions were sometimes unreliable. Many problems stemmed from the sensitive electronics controlling the car's hydraulic system, often caused by the poor quality of the multipoint grounding blocks – one on each front inner wing, one at the rear, and one under the dashboard. These tended to corrode (especially the ones in the engine compartment), causing all manner of intermittent faults which were hard to diagnose. On later cars, these were changed to screw terminals bolted through the bodywork, and most of the older cars have been modified in a similar way.

When functioning correctly, the Hydractive system provided high levels of ride comfort alongside handling characteristics comparable to smaller, lighter vehicles. Conversely, a system failure resulted in a significantly firmer ride, similar to the suspension turning of contemporary high-performance sports sedans.

Although the Hydractive suspension coped superbly with undulations and driving at speed, it could be unexpectedly harsh if a sudden change in road height was encountered at moderate speed - e.g. lateral ridges or speed bumps. Citroën finally addressed this, and for Xantia (which shared the Hydractive system with XM) came up with a modified design of the suspension (centre sphere) regulator valves, which made them immune to hydraulic impulses produced by the road surface, and which could push the older-type valves into Firm mode, just when this wasn't needed. The modified valves were fitted to production Xantias from 8 March 1999 (and were available as replacements), but were not fitted to XM, which was nearing end of production. Interest in these new-type valves has led to a good few XM owners successfully fitting them, and benefiting from a noticeable improvement in smoothness and consistency of ride.

Some production models of the XM were not equipped with the Hydractive system, but had a 'conventional' hydropneumatic suspension closer to that of the Citroën BX. These lower specification vehicles were all built for markets in mainland Europe.

=== DIRAVI steering ===
A function much missed by Citroën enthusiasts was the "DIRAVI" System, previously present in the SM and CX. This option was only available for the French or LHD Export market and then only on the 3.0 V6 models. The functionality varied from car to car, but simply put the system affects steering control, at lower speeds less steering centering force aids parking and make city driving easier, but at higher speeds the system makes the steering heavier keeping you in a straight line on highways and suppressing the "sneeze" factor inherent to fast steering ratios. Another helpful function of DIRAVI is its ability to return the steering wheel to its central or neutral position when let go by the driver, even when the car is stationary. This is especially helpful when parking as the driver can be assured that their wheels will be in the correct position when the ignition is turned off; again this function also aids high speed, straight line driving on highways etc. Although an odd sensation to start with, most Citroën drivers become accustomed to DIRAVI in a very short time, only appreciating its unique abilities when they let go of the steering wheel in a car without DIRAVI, only to find nothing happens. DIRAVI makes the tendency of all cars' steering to return to center constant in DIRAVI equipped Citroëns, rather than being affected by tire adhesion, road tilt, tire pressure, tire failure, etc.

== Engines ==
The XM was fitted with a wide range of gasoline and diesel engines:

| Model | Engine | Displacement | Valvetrain | Fuel system | Max. power at rpm (DIN) | Max. torque at rpm (DIN) | 0–100 km/h (0-62 mph) | Top speed | Years |
|---|---|---|---|---|---|---|---|---|---|
Petrol engines
| 2.0 | XU10 2C/K | 1998 cc | SOHC 8v | Carburettor | 115 PS (85 kW; 113 hp) at 5,800 rpm | 171 N⋅m (126 lb⋅ft) at 2,250 rpm | 12.2 s | 193 km/h (120 mph) | 1989–1992 |
| 2.0 cat | XU10 M-Z | 1998 cc | SOHC 8v | Single-point fuel injection | 110 PS (81 kW; 108 hp) at 5,600 rpm | 169 N⋅m (125 lb⋅ft) at 3,500 rpm | 12.4 s | 190 km/h (118 mph) | 1989–1994 |
| 2.0 inj. | XU10 J2/K | 1998 cc | SOHC 8v | Multi-point fuel injection | 130 PS (96 kW; 130 hp) at 5,600 rpm | 179 N⋅m (132 lb⋅ft) at 4,800 rpm | 11.5 s | 205 km/h (127 mph) | 1989–1992 |
| 2.0 inj. cat | XU10 J2C (RFU) | 1998 cc | SOHC 8v | Multi-point fuel injection | 122 PS (90 kW; 120 hp) at 5,600 rpm | 172 N⋅m (127 lb⋅ft) at 4,000 rpm | 11.9 s | 201 km/h (125 mph) | 1989–1994 |
| 2.0 i 16V | XU10 J4R (RFV) | 1998 cc | DOHC 16v | Multi-point fuel injection | 135 PS (99 kW; 133 hp) at 5,500 rpm | 180 N⋅m (133 lb⋅ft) at 4,200 rpm | 10.8 s | 205 km/h (127 mph) | 1994–2000 |
| 2.0 i Turbo CT | XU10 J2TE (RGY) | 1998 cc | SOHC 8v | Multi-point fuel injection | 145 PS (107 kW; 143 hp) at 4,400 rpm | 225 N⋅m (166 lb⋅ft) at 2,200 rpm | 9.8 s | 212 km/h (132 mph) | 1992–1994 |
| 2.0 i Turbo CT | XU10 J2TE (RGX) | 1998 cc | SOHC 8v | Multi-point fuel injection | 150 PS (110 kW; 148 hp) at 5,300 rpm | 235 N⋅m (173 lb⋅ft) at 2,500 rpm | 9.3 s | 215 km/h (134 mph) | 1994–2000 |
| 3.0 i V6 | PRV ZPJ S6A | 2975 cc | SOHC 12v | Multi-point fuel injection | 170 PS (125 kW; 168 hp) at 5,600 rpm | 240 N⋅m (177 lb⋅ft) at 4,600 rpm | 8.9 s | 222 km/h (138 mph) | 1989–1993 |
| 3.0 i V6 | PRV ZPJ S6A | 2963 cc | SOHC 12v | Multi-point fuel injection | 167 PS (123 kW; 165 hp) at 5,600 rpm | 235 N⋅m (173 lb⋅ft) at 4,600 rpm | 9.7 s | 222 km/h (138 mph) | 1993–1997 |
| 3.0 i V6 24V | PRV ZPJ4/Y3 | 2975 cc | SOHC 24v | Multi-point fuel injection | 200 PS (147 kW; 197 hp) at 6,000 rpm | 260 N⋅m (192 lb⋅ft) at 3,600 rpm | 8.6 s (Note: In 1991 the official Citroën acceleration time for the XM 3.0 V6.24 was listed as 8.0 s. From 1992 on, the number was for unknown reasons changed to 8.6 s. Similar changes (longer times) was also introduced at the same time for most other motors in the XM.) | 235 km/h (146 mph) | 1990–1993 |
| 3.0 i V6 24V | PRV ZPJ4 SKZ | 2963 cc | SOHC 24v | Multi-point fuel injection | 200 PS (147 kW; 197 hp) at 6,000 rpm | 260 N⋅m (192 lb⋅ft) at 3,600 rpm | 8.6 s | 235 km/h (146 mph) | 1993–1996 |
| 2.9 i V6 24V | ES9 J4 (XFX) | 2946 cc | DOHC 24v | Multi-point fuel injection | 194 PS (143 kW; 191 hp) at 5,500 rpm | 267 N⋅m (197 lb⋅ft) at 4,500 rpm | 8.4 s | 233 km/h (145 mph) | 1997–2000 |
Diesel engines
| 2.1 D12 | XUD11 A (PJZ) | 2138 cc | SOHC 12v | Indirect injection | 83 PS (61 kW; 82 hp) at 4,600 rpm | 147 N⋅m (108 lb⋅ft) at 2,000 rpm | 17.6 s | 173 km/h (107 mph) | 1989–1994 |
| 2.1 Turbo D12 | XUD11 ATE (PHZ) | 2088 cc | SOHC 12v | Indirect injection | 110 PS (81 kW; 110 hp) at 4,300 rpm with EGR: 109 PS (80 kW; 108 hp) | 248 N⋅m (183 lb⋅ft) at 2,000 rpm with EGR: 235 N⋅m (173 lb⋅ft) | 12.4 s | 192 km/h (119 mph) | 1989–1994 |
| 2.1 Turbo D12 | XUD11 BTE (P8C) | 2088 cc | SOHC 12v | Indirect injection | 109 PS (80 kW; 108 hp) at 4,300 rpm | 250 N⋅m (184 lb⋅ft) at 2,000 rpm | 12.9 s | 192 km/h (119 mph) | 1994–2000 |
| 2.5 Turbo D12 | DK5 ATE/L (THY) | 2446 cc | SOHC 12v | Indirect injection | 129 PS (95 kW; 127 hp) at 4,300 rpm | 285 N⋅m (210 lb⋅ft) at 2,000 rpm | 12.1 s | 201 km/h (125 mph) | 1994–2000 |

Being part of the PSA Peugeot-Citroën company, most of these engines were found in contemporary PSA cars, like the Citroën Xantia, Citroën C5, Peugeot 405, Peugeot 406 and Peugeot 605. The ZF 4HP18 automatic transmission – the late V6 had 4HP20 – was used also in Saab 9000, Peugeot 605, Alfa Romeo 164, Lancia Thema and the Fiat Croma.

== Dimensions and weights ==
- Length: 4,709 mm (185.4 in) (Berline) or 4,950 mm (194.9 in) (Break) or 4,963 mm (195.4 in) (1998 V6 Break)
- Width: 1,793 mm (70.6 in)
- Height: 1,392 mm (54.8 in) (most Berline models); some turbo models 1,385 mm (54.5 in); 1,466 mm (57.7 in) (1998 V6 Break)
- Wheelbase: 2,850 mm (112.2 in)
- Ground clearance: 140 mm (5.5 in)
- Weight: 1,310 kg (2,888 lb) (2.0i Berline) – 1,400 kg (3,086 lb) (2.0 Turbo Berline) – 1,453 kg (3,203 lb) (Turbo Break) – 1,475 kg (3,252 lb) (1990 V6) – 1,642 kg (3,620 lb) (Turbo 2.5D Break) – 1,655 kg (3,649 lb) (1998 V6 Break)
- Fuel tank capacity: 80 L (21 US gal; 18 imp gal)

== Multimedia edition ==
In 1998, a modified XM was shown off at the Paris Mondial auto show and included lots of technological features that made most cars look dated. Called the XM Multimedia, it showcased the combination of computers and cars and what was to come in the future. With their experience with the Citroën Xsara Intel prototype in 1997, they proved that technology in a passenger car was possible and they wanted to push the boundaries with this next model.

At the front, a Route Planner navigation system made by Magneti Marelli helps aid the driver with directions. A voice synthesizer reads out the information displayed on the screen. In the back seats, a touchscreen computer running Windows 98 allows the rear passengers to access the Internet, television, and telephone as well as a fax machine included in the vehicle. After the success of the prototype, 50 units were sold to dealers as demonstrations and when sold to customers, the PC and fax machine were removed to avoid warranty claims.

These special XMs were painted in Pearlescent Hell Red and the interiors were trimmed with more wood than the average XM. Tray tables are in the back for rear seat passengers to use a keyboard and mouse if desired.

== Reliability ==
=== Electrical connectors ===
The XM's reliability became suspect due to a problem with the quality of electrical connector used.

Cost-cutting on the components was needed since the parent company was in financial difficulty at the time of the design of the XM. Between 1980 and 1984 the company lost $1.5 billion.

Poor electrical connections would stop the car, and require extensive investigation by a trained mechanic to repair. This point was driven home in one of the final reviews of 2000, when Richard Bremner's polemical "Parting Shot" essay in Car emphasized these electrical faults. Bremner paid less attention to the remediation of the problem and to the fact that changed market conditions meant demand for the XM was never going to be the same as for its predecessor.

=== Headlight issues ===
Components supplier Valeo designed the XM's lamps and a similar design was used on the Eagle Premier. The goal of the design was to reduce the size of the lamps and to increase their output. The XM's new "complex surface" headlamps were not powerful enough on dipped beam, though main beam was perfectly adequate. This could be traced to the use of a plastic optical element between the bulb and the outer lens, which yellowed with age.

The XM was not alone here; the pre-facelifted first-generation Ford Mondeos suffered from the same problem. Series 2 (from mid-1994 onwards) LHD XMs had improved light units without the plastic element, but slow United Kingdom sales meant these were never fitted to RHD forms. Headlamp retrofit kits using dual or triple round optics are available from third party suppliers, though this changes the aesthetics of the car. Series 1 cars can be fitted with series 2 headlights.

== US import ==
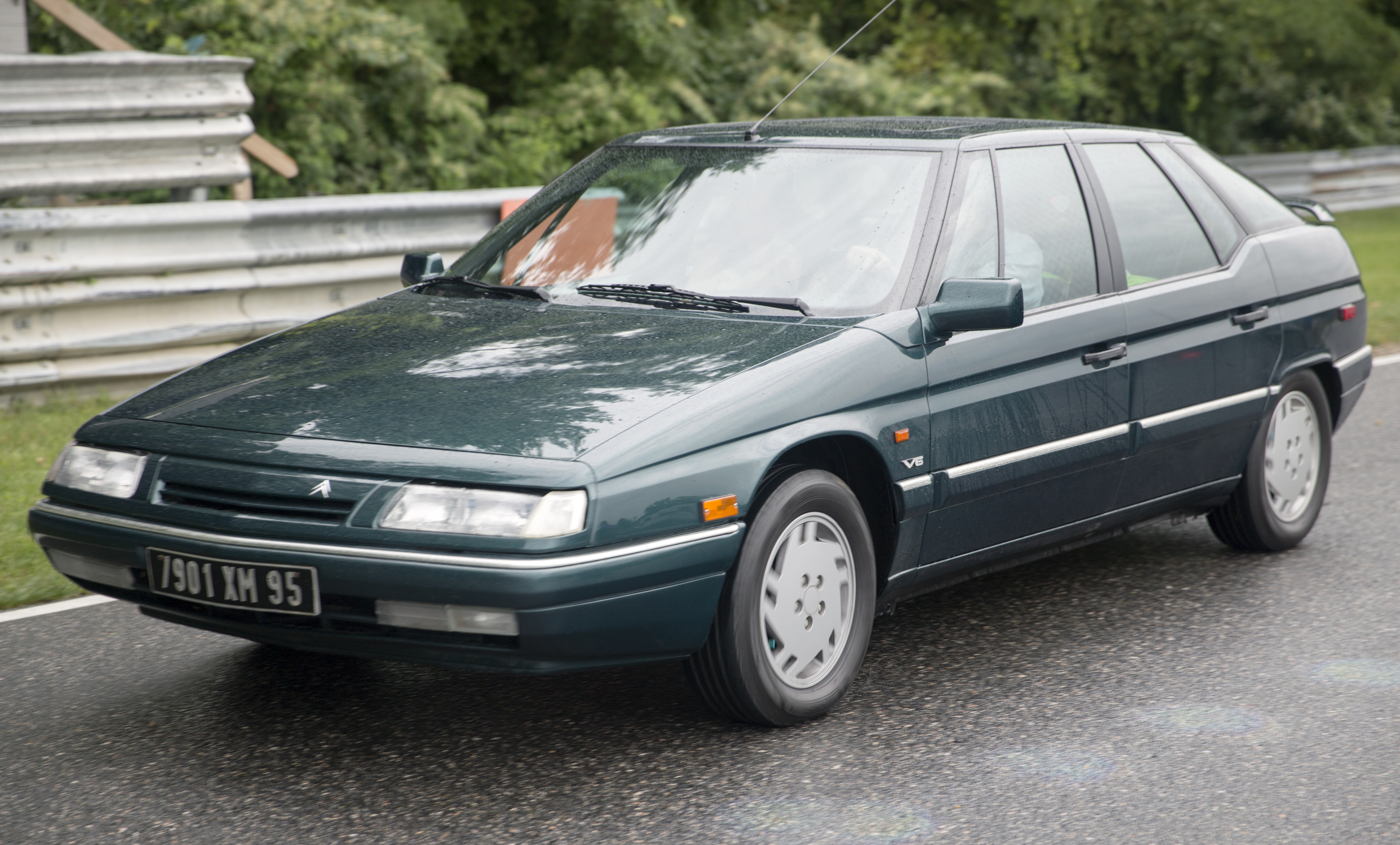
Citroën XM Vitesse (Federalized model converted by CxAuto)

The XM was imported into the United States by CXA, a company that had imported and federalized several hundred CX25 GTi and Prestige model cars for Citroën loyalists in the USA. These cars can be recognized by small filler plates at the headlights, as CxAuto installed the slightly narrower headlight units from the 1988–1993 Pontiac Grand Prix.

CxAuto presented the XM at the 1991 New York Motor Show, in the spring of 1991, and began converting and selling the XM Pallas (combined with the 2.0 injection engine) and the XM Vitesse (combined with the 3.0 V6 engine). In 1993, the XM Exclusive was added to the range. Unfortunately, the XM cost 40 percent more than the CX Prestige, with a price in excess of $50,000 due to the costs needed for the cars to comply with US regulations and only a few examples were sold. As a result of newer, tougher US anti-pollution standards, the import of these cars ceased in 1997. XM parts must be sent over from Europe.

== Chinese production ==
The Citroën XM, along with the Citroën Xantia were assembled in a form of CKD in Huizhou, Guangdong province. This venture lasted for only two years in 1996 and 1997 and production numbers were extremely low. The cars were imported to China more or less fully assembled with only minor additions done in China as a way to avoid the high import tariffs on cars that existed at the time. The two models were given the same name: Fengshen Xuetielong XM.
