= AzSamand =

Azerbaijani automobile factory

- Company type: Private Company
- Industry: Automotive
- Founded: 2005
- Headquarters: Shamakhi, Azerbaijan
- Products: Automobiles
- Parent: Evsen Group
- Website: evsengroup.az

AzSamand was an automobile factory belonging to Evsen Group Company located in Şamaxı, Azerbaijan.

== History ==
The project opened in October 2005, with the support of the Government of Azerbaijan. The automobiles branded "Aziz" (Note: Short for Azerbaijani: Azərbaycan inamla zirvələrə, lit. 'Azerbaijan confidently at the top'.) have the "AzSamand" label. AzSamand works with Iran Khodro and also was planning to produce cars with diesel engines. In May 2010, both groups submitted designs for the engine. (Note: The new models of diesel cars will start producing in Azerbaijan this year.)

The factory closed in 2010, having produced 1,500 Samand cars over four years.

== Models ==
- IKCO Samand (2005–present)
- IKCO Samand Soren (2010–present)
- IKCO Runna (2010–present)
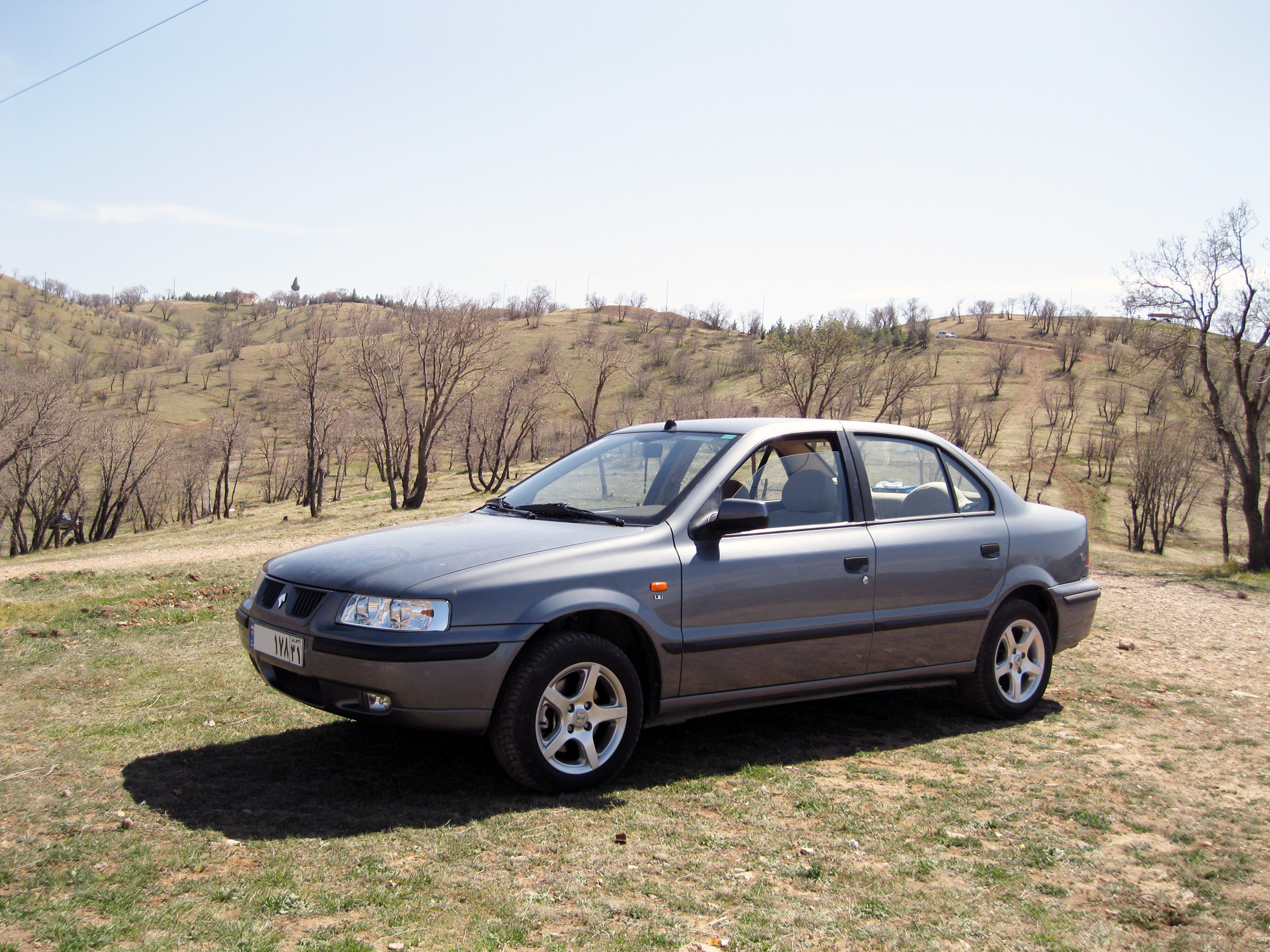
IKCO Samand

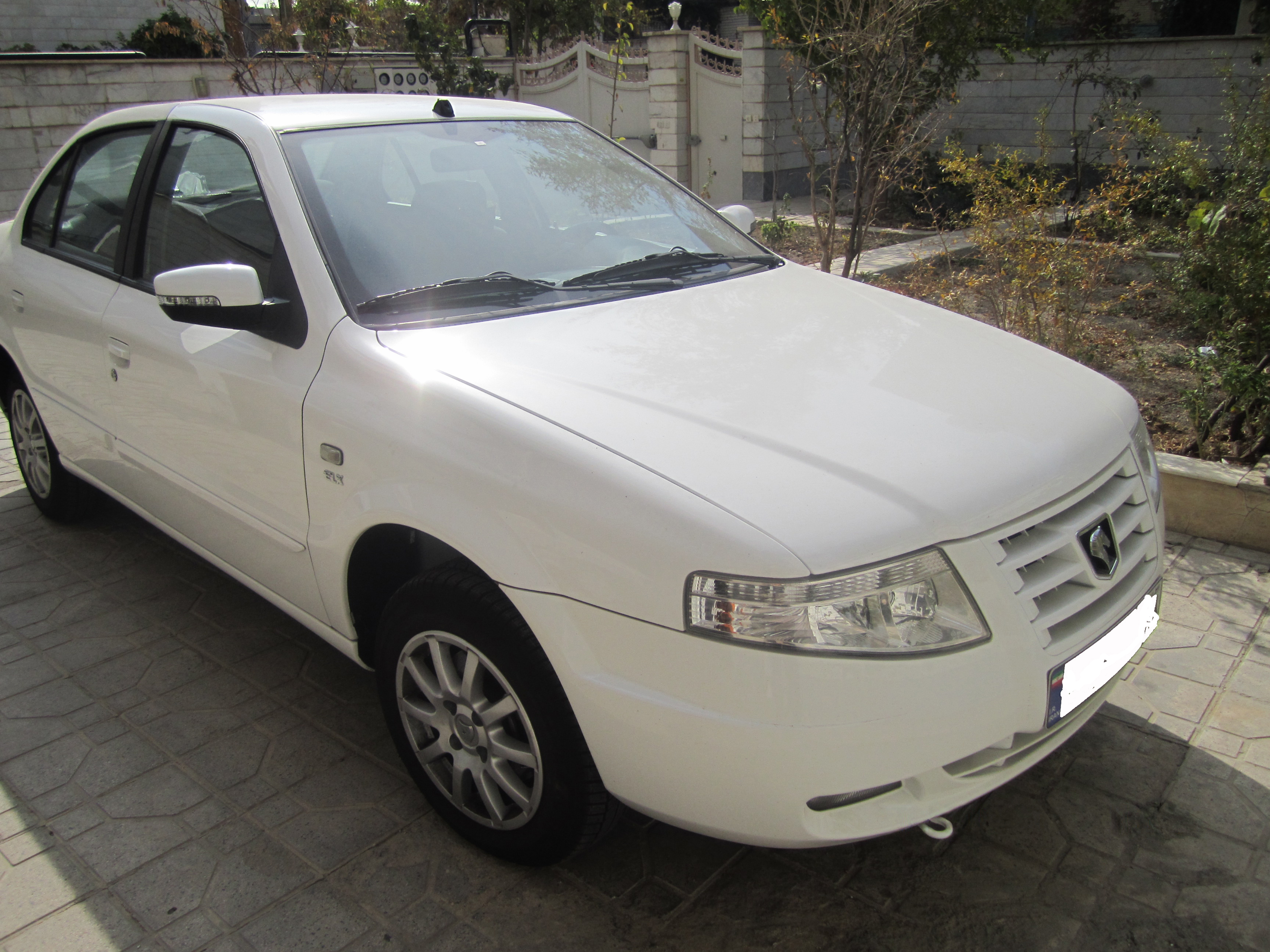
IKCO Samand Soren

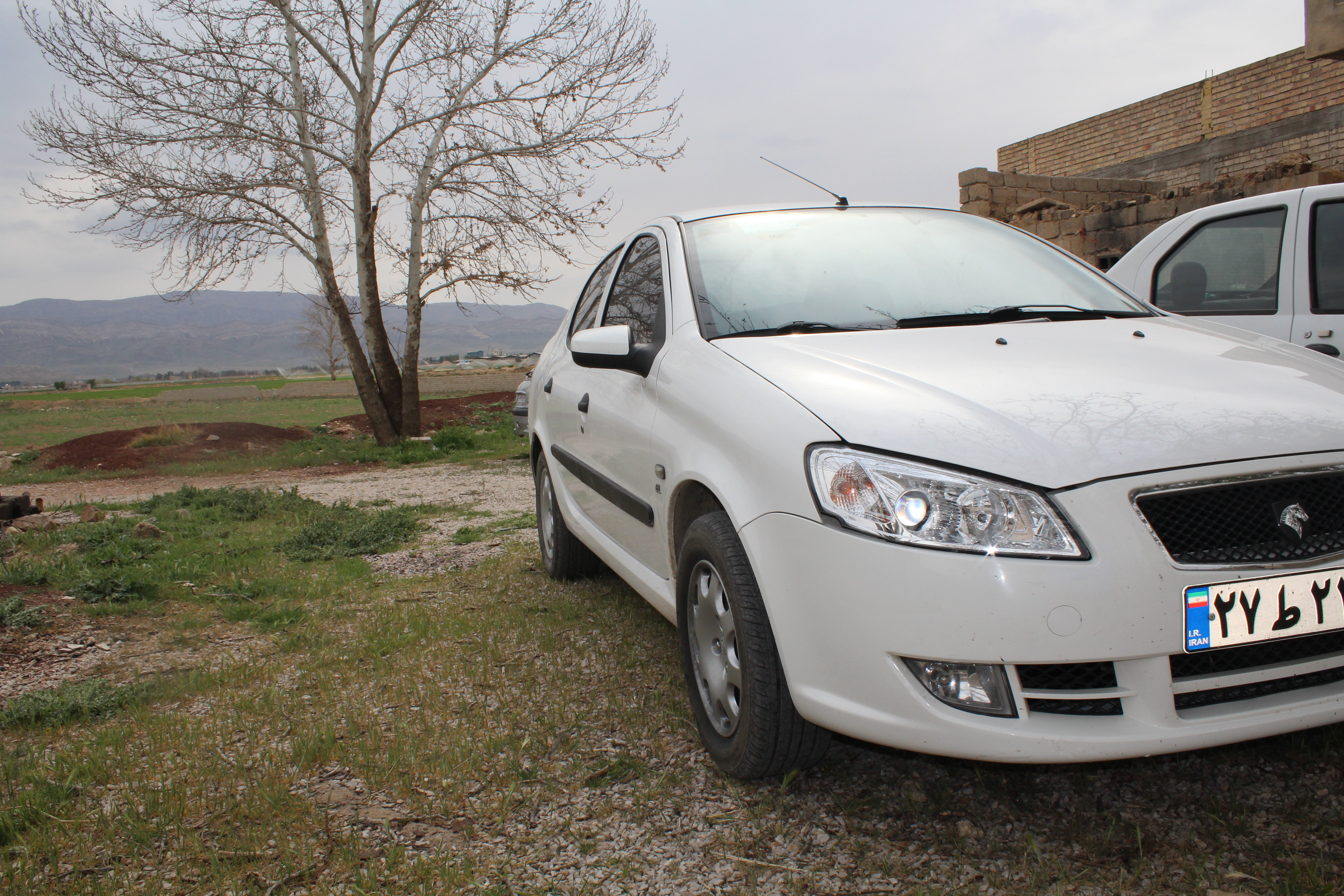
IKCO Runna
