= IKCO Dena =

Iran Khodro automobile

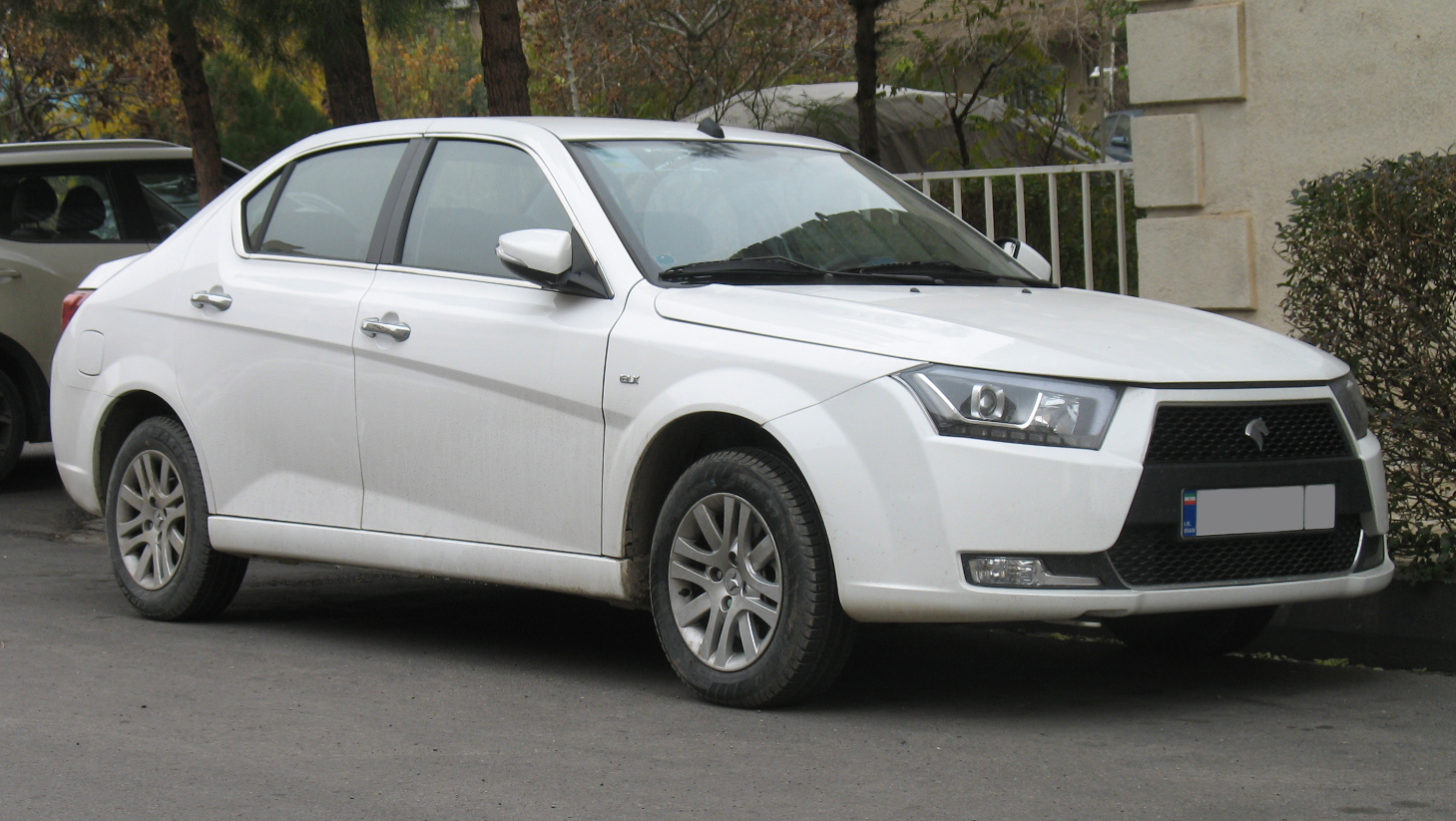
- IKCO Dena Plus

Overview
- Manufacturer: IKCO
- Model code: NX7
- Also called: Khazar SD/LD (Azerbaijan)
- Production: 2015–2021 (Dena); 2017–present (Dena Plus)
- Assembly: Iran: Tehran (Iran Khodro Corporation); Azerbaijan: Neftchala (Khazar)

Body and chassis
- Class: Large family car (D)
- Body style: 4-door saloon
- Layout: Front engine, Front-wheel drive
- Platform: Peugeot 405 modified platform (X700)
- Related: Peugeot 405; Peugeot Pars; IKCO Samand; IKCO Samand Soren

Powertrain
- Engine: 1648 cc EF7 I4
- Transmission: 5-Speed manual 6-Speed automatic 6-Speed manual

Dimensions
- Wheelbase: 2,671 mm (105.2 in)
- Length: 4,558 mm (179.4 in)
- Width: 1,720 mm (67.7 in)
- Height: 1,460 mm (57.5 in)
- Curb weight: 1,258 kg (2,773 lb)

Chronology
- Predecessor: IKCO Soren

The IKCO Dena is a family car manufactured by Iran Khodro (IKCO). It was unveiled in April 2011, with mass-production starting in 2015. Its price range was between USD12,000 and USD13,000, depending on the specific model and accessories. The Dena replaced the IKCO Samand in overseas markets.

The Dena is named after the peak Dena in the Zagros Mountains, 35 km north-west of Yasuj in western Iran. This name was chosen to identify the car as a symbol of technological improvement as well as the lofty height of the company's aspirations.

== Design and development ==
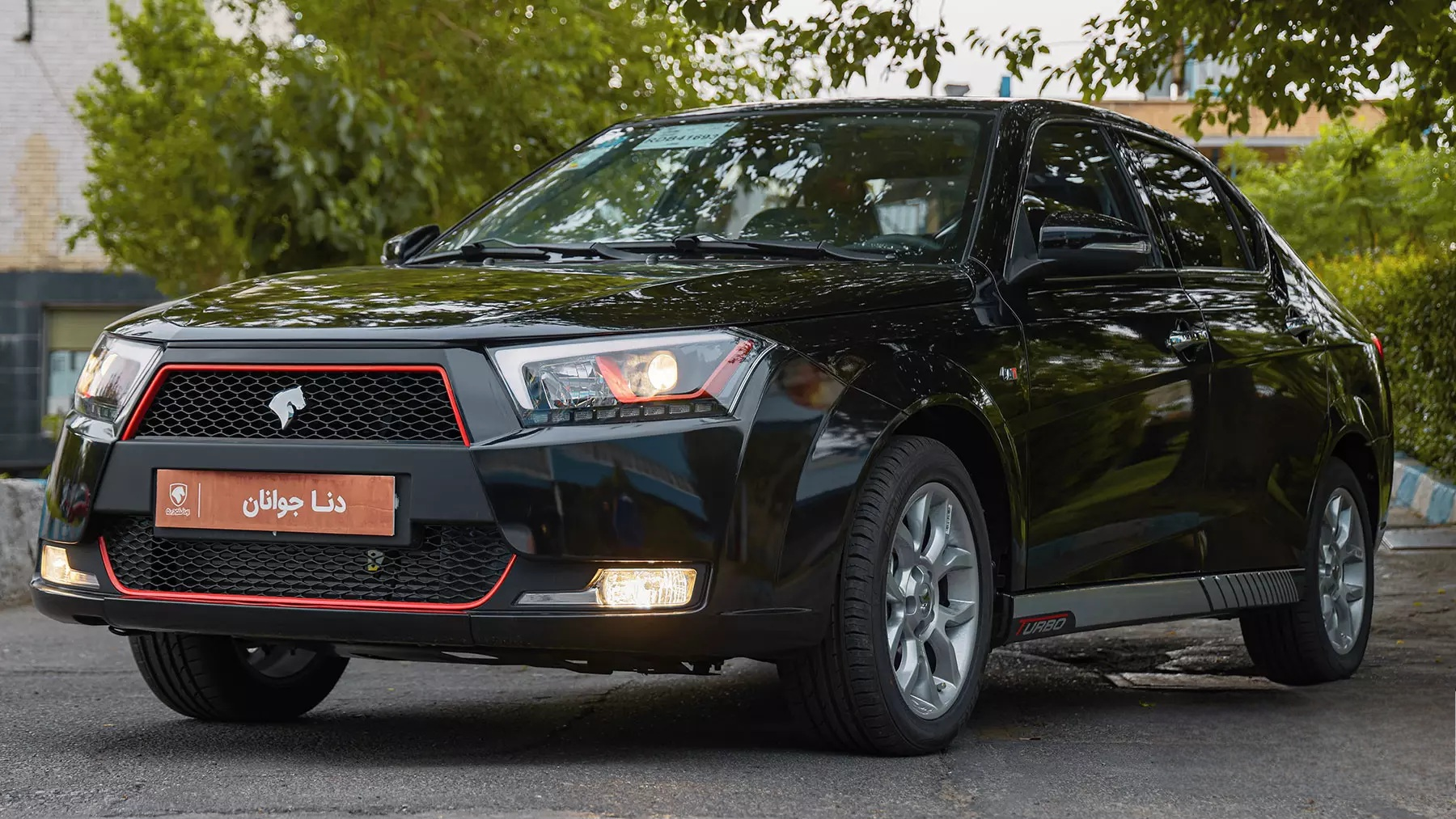
IKCO Dena Javanan

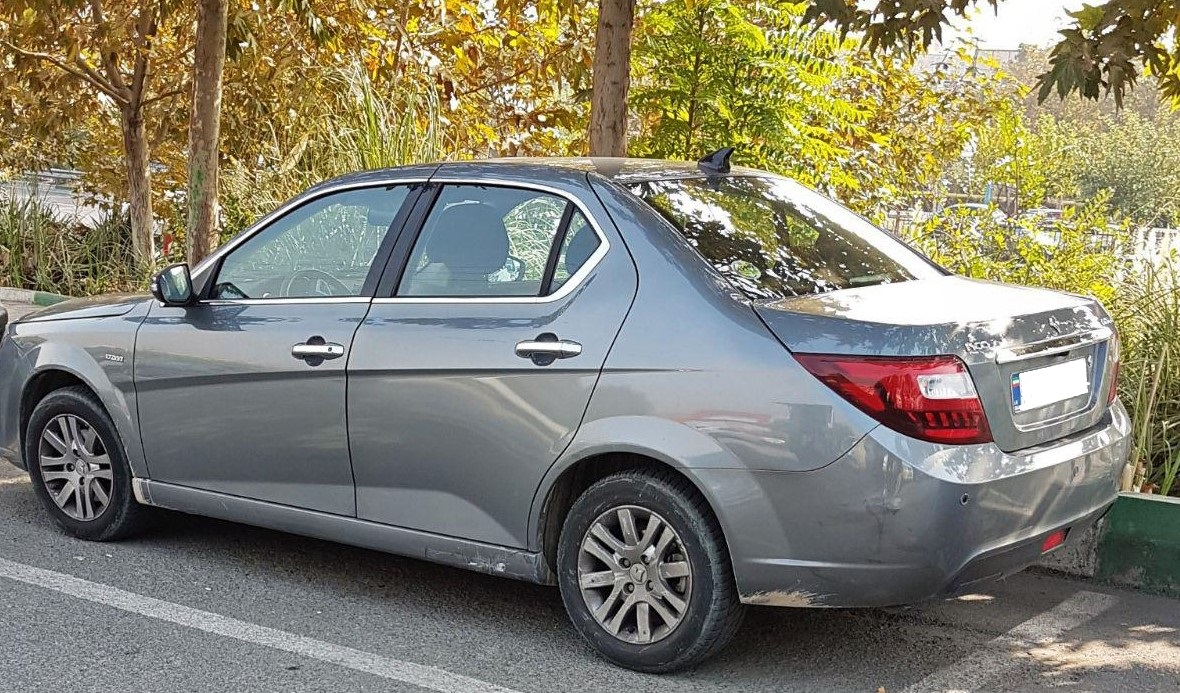
Rear view

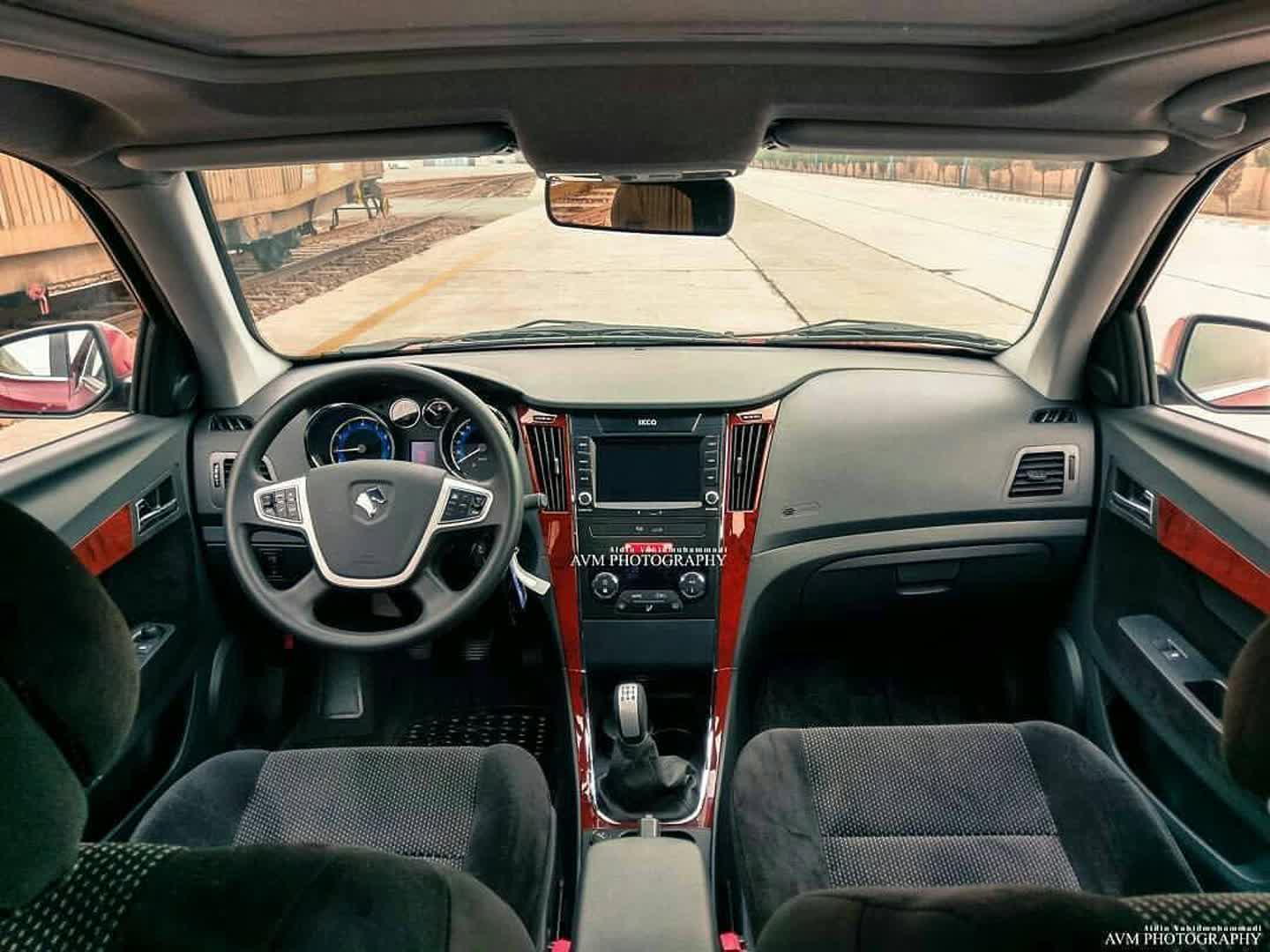
Interior view

The project was outlined in March 2010 and began operating in February 2011, which is considered a record in car production process according to IKCO. Dena was first unveiled in April 2011. At the time, it was initially scheduled to hit the Iranian markets in April 2012. In 2020, IKCO announced a turbocharged version of Dena.

The Dena is built on the IKCO Samand platform, measuring same in width and only 50 millimeters apart in length. Three different locally produced engines based on Peugeot's TU5JP4 will be available; EF7 NA, Dena ELX EF7 and EF7 TC, all manual gearbox. Side airbags will be optional while front airbags are included, ABS will also be standard on all models.

However, the IKCO Dena has faced criticism for its substandard build quality and persistent technical defects.

By 2015, mass-production of the Dena had commenced with 8,437 units being produced for the first seven months of 2015, or up to July 2015 which corresponds to Tir 1394 in the Persian calendar. By comparison, only 48 units of the Dena were produced for the whole of 1393 SH. Additionally, 30,472 units of the older Samand and 7,332 units of the smaller Runna have also been produced in the first seven months of 2015.

=== Javanan (EFP) ===
In 2023 IKCO revealed the Dena Javanan (Persian: جوانان) edition which was a variant of the existing Dena Plus Turbo, a performance variation of the Dena aimed at youthful buyers. The Dena Javanan uses IKCO's new, turbocharged 1.7-litre inline-four EFP engine. The engine produces 163 PS (120 kW) and 240 N⋅m (177 lb⋅ft), the Javanan is offered with new features as well such as a keyless entry system (and keyless go), a start-stop system, electrochromic mirror, electronic stability control system, and a tire-pressure monitoring system.

== See also ==
- IKCO Runna
- Iran Khodro
- Iranian automobile industry
