= Peugeot Pars =

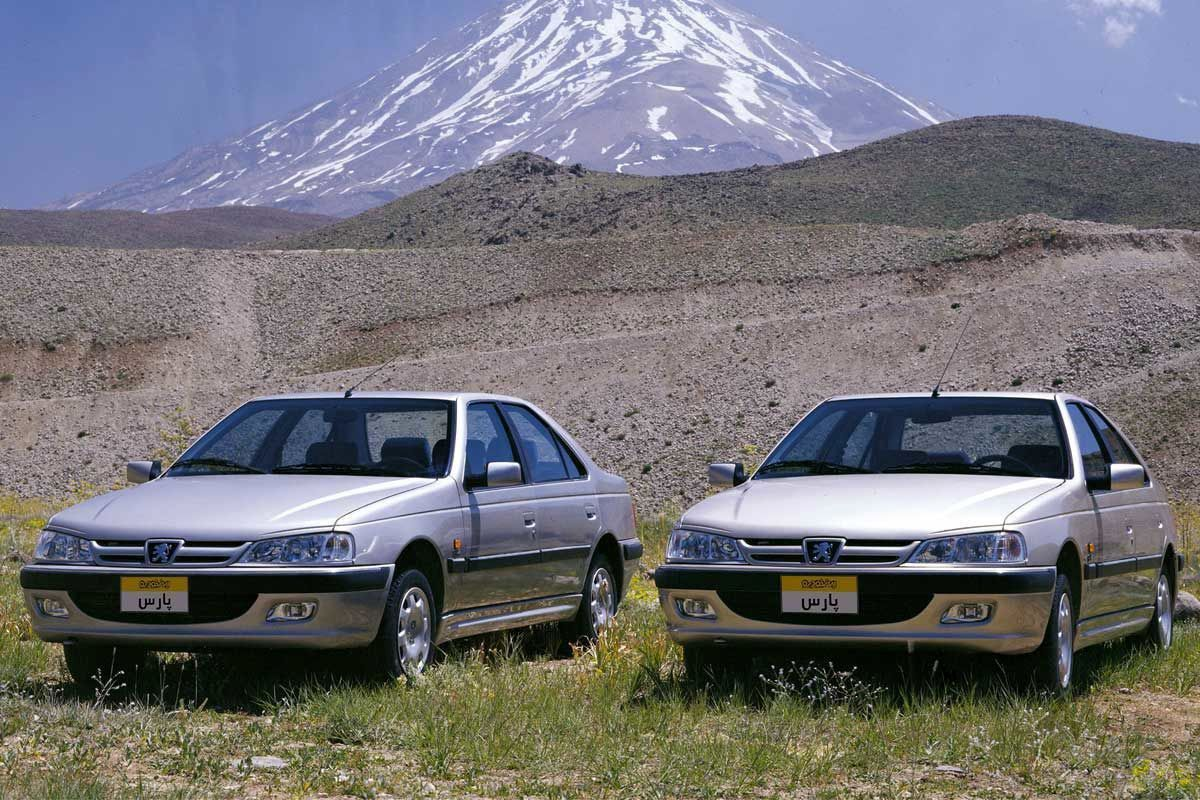

Overview
- Manufacturer: Iran Khodro; Peugeot (2000–2005)
- Also called: Peugeot Persia; Peugeot Safir; Peugeot Khazar 406 (Azerbaijan)
- Production: 2000–2024
- Assembly: Iran: Tehran (2000–2023); Azerbaijan: Neftchala (Khazar: 2019–2024); Egypt: Cairo (AAV: 2008–2015); Iraq (2012–2024); Senegal: Thiès (SenIran: 2012–2024)

Body and chassis
- Class: Large family car (D)
- Body style: 4-door saloon
- Layout: FF layout
- Platform: Peugeot 405
- Related: Citroën Xantia; Peugeot 405; IKCO Arisun 2 IKCO Samand; IKCO Dena

Powertrain
- Engine: 1.8L XU7 8V I4; 1.8L XU7 JP4 16V I4; 1.6L TU5 JP4 16V I4; 1.8L XU7+ 8V I4; 1.9L XUM 8V I4

Chronology
- Predecessor: Peugeot 405
- Successor: IKCO Soren Plus

The Peugeot Pars (Persian: پژو پارس), previously known as Peugeot Persia and Peugeot Safir, is a passenger car produced by the Iranian carmaker Iran Khodro. After 10 years of manufacturing the Peugeot 405 in Iran, the Peugeot company designed the Peugeot Persia For Iran as its facelift, with a front end design similar to that of the Peugeot 406. The Peugeot Persia was soon renamed Peugeot Safir and eventually Peugeot Pars because of local copyright problems.

== Versions ==
The Peugeot Pars was offered in multiple variants. The 16V, ELX and LX models use the more powerful PSA 16-valve engines and have come with a few other improvements.

=== Peugeot Pars ===
The initial variation of the Peugeot Pars, was introduced in early 2000 by Iran Khodro/IKCO. The car was powered by a 1.8-liter 8-valve XU7JP/L3 engine capable of producing 100 PS (74 kW) and 153 N⋅m (113 lb⋅ft) of torque. The Pars was the first car to use this engine in the line-up of cars offered by IKCO. and shortly after, it was also used in the Samand and Peugeot 405 GLX 1.8i. In 2014, the dashboard was updated and almost completely redesigned (this type of dashboard design was later referred to as the sonata dashboard), and the side mirrors were equipped with turn signals, this specific model was released under the name Pars Sal (as in the year edition, سال in persian). The CNG/BiFuel variation of this car was discontinued in 2021. In 2022, Iran Khodro/IKCO introduced the XU7P engine for the Pars base model, replacing the XU7JP/L3 engine. The custom order (سفارشی in persian) variation of this car was available with aluminum rims, rear disc brakes (rear drum brakes in other standard trims and models), and tinted rear windows.

=== Peugeot Pars LX ===
This version uses a 1.6 L, 16-valve engine. The PSA-borrowed engine is the TU5JP4 (code NFU, known as TU5 in Iran) DOHC with 4 valves per cylinder capable of producing a maximum power of 109 PS (80 kW) at 5800 rpm and a maximum torque of 142 N⋅m (105 lb⋅ft) at 4000 rpm which is controlled by a Crouse or Bosch ECU. The same engine was already powering The PSA Peugeot 206 (types 5 and 6) and the Peugeot 405 SLX. This engine was used for the IKCO Runna as well.

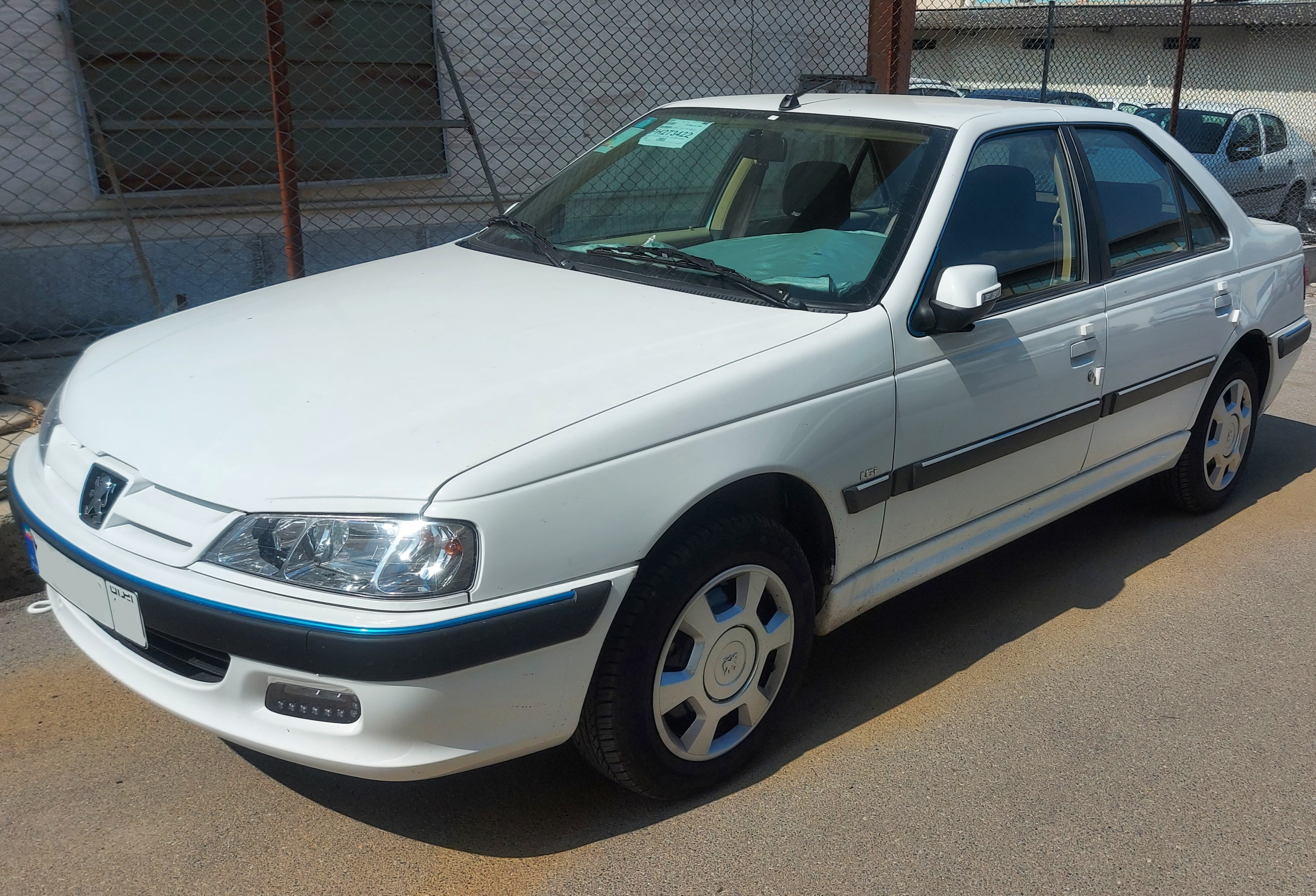
Peugeot Pars LX

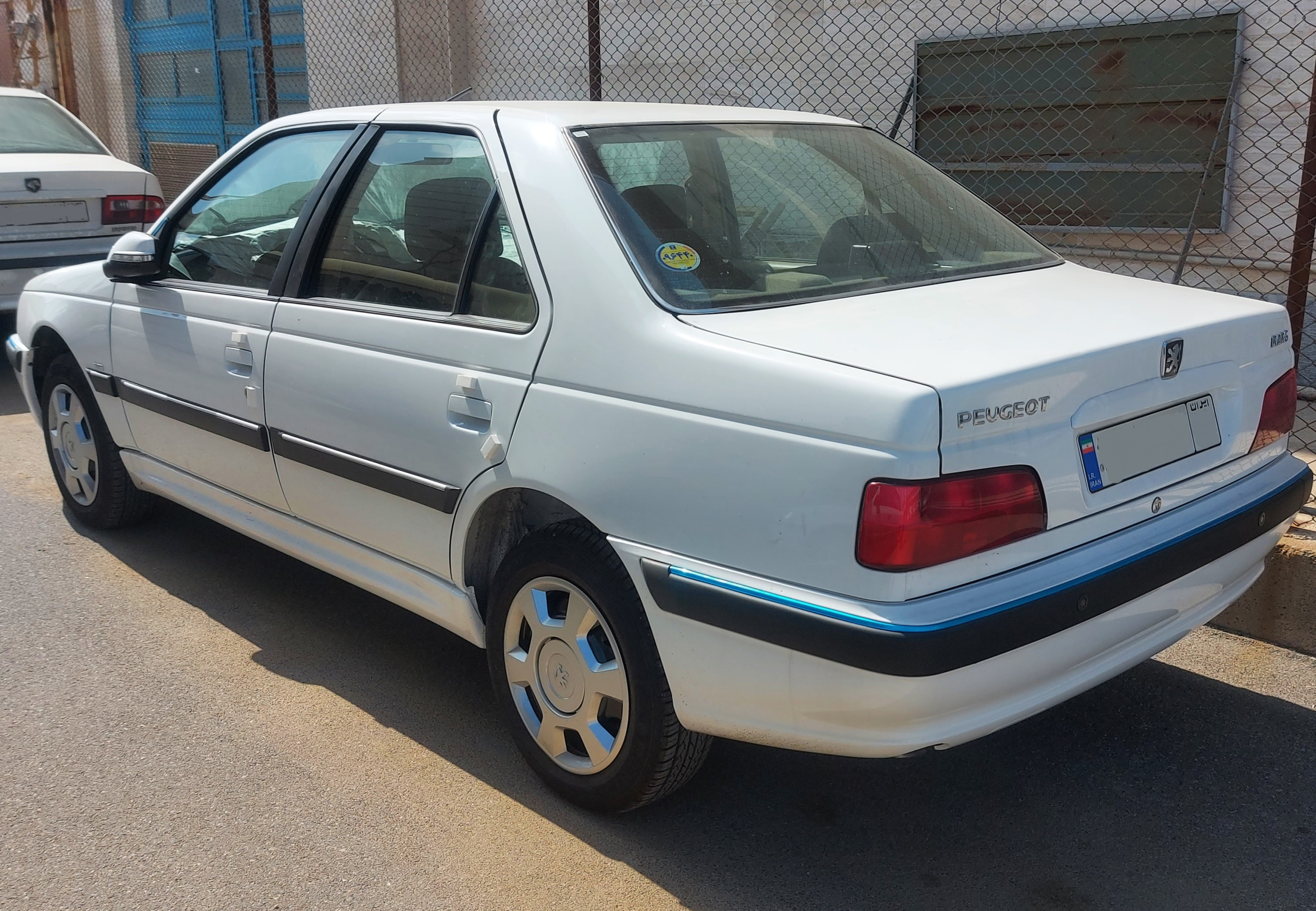
Rear view

=== Peugeot Pars ELX ===
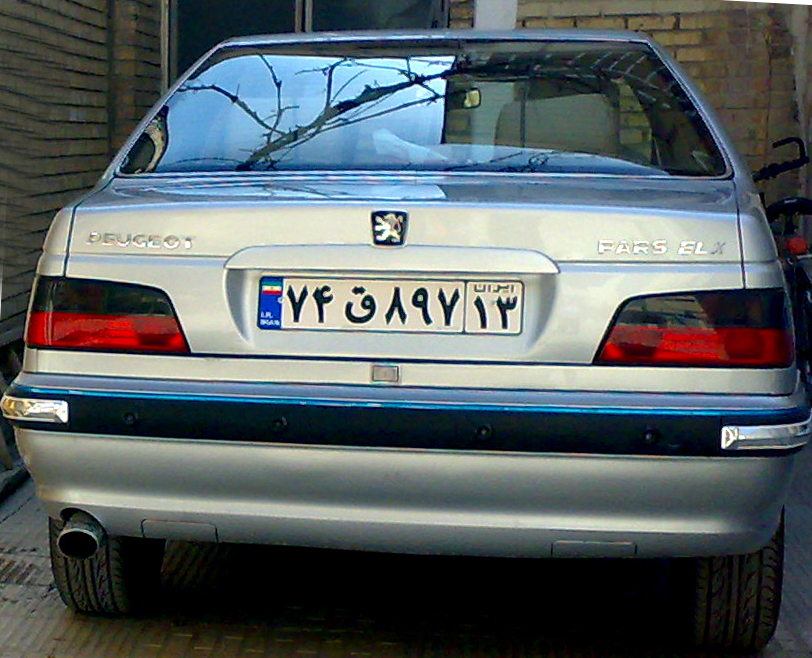
Peugeot Pars ELX XU7

The higher end version of the pars named the ELX featured a smart instrument cluster, multi-purpose Persian-reading dashboard telematics, alarm with door auto-lock, park assistant, electric Recaro cloth seats equipped with heating/cooling fan, more luxurious dashboard trim materials, passenger illuminated vanity mirror, 4-disc brakes with ABS/EBD, and rally alloy wheels.

The engine used for the ELX was the XU7JP4 (code LFY, known as the L4 in Iran) 1.8 L 16-valve DOHC with 4 hydraulically adjusted valves per cylinder capable of producing a maximum power of 109.0 bhp (81.3 kW / 110.5 PS) at 5500 rpm and a maximum torque of 155.0 N·m (15.8 kgf·m / 114 ft·lbf) at 4250 rpm which is controlled by a Bosch Motronic MP 7.3 ECU. The same engine was already used in PSA's Peugeot 406 LX 1.8i 16v, the Citroën Xantia SX 1.8i 16v, and the Citroën Xsara VTS 1.8i 16v

IKCO replaced the ELXs engine with the new (at the time) XUM powertrain, the 8-valve 1.9L PSA XUM Engine which makes 105 horsepower and 155 Nm of torque. The new ELX XUM was also more equipped with features and amenities, this time around coming with a new steering wheel which had buttons on it to control multi media, A Passenger Airbag, Handsfree For the Radio, New black and beige trimming and Wood trimming, and a new Gauge Cluster. The ELX XUM stopped being offered and produced in 2017.

After a five-year hiatus, the well-equipped ELX returned in 2022, this time however with more features, like Cruise control, Rain sensor, Tire-pressure monitoring system, In-car entertainment system which included a Touch Screen Display, Etc. however it did not come with tech that the original ELX came with, such as the electronically powered recaro seats.

Whilst much more equipped than the previous ELX trim level, It instead had much weaker powertrain options, a 1.8L XU7+ Straight-four engine or a 1.6L TU5 JP4 16 Valve Straight-four engine which was already used in the Peugeot 206, Peugeot 405 SLX and the IKCO Runna. The 1.8L XU7+ was a first timer engine for IKCO which was soon used in the IKCO Arisun.

=== Peugeot Pars 16V ===
Not as well equipped as the ELX, this model was simply an upgraded version of the Pars in terms of engine and rear brakes. The 16V employed a more powerful 16 valve engine, and rear disc brakes, but ABS was not available even as an option. The 16V model's production lasted less than a year; began on the second quarter of 2003 and ended on the first quarter of 2004 (making them 1382 model year based on Persian calendar), the same time it was replaced with the ELX model.

The Iran Khodro website contradicts this information, stating that a non-ELX 16V variant was still produced in 2009 (and with drum brakes in the rear).

Many Iranian car industry critics believe its production was a case study of the Iranian car market capacity performed by Iran Khodro before beginning the production of ELX to see if people are interested in more powerful and luxurious versions of Pars.

As an improvement over the Pars, the 16V utilizes solid disc brakes on rear wheels, but unlike the ELX which is equipped with an advanced ABS/EBD, the 16V model uses the same vacuum booster, master cylinder, distributor, and hydraulic lines in its braking system as the standard Pars.

The more powerful LFY engine (later used on the ELX) fitted to the 16V models grabbed the interest of the authorities who are always seeking for high-performance yet inexpensive cars as service vehicles. A large number of 16Vs were produced according to requests registered by Iranian governmental organizations. 16Vs can be seen as parliament service cars and also motorcade escorts.

== Facelifts ==
Two facelifts were designed for the Peugeot Pars, neither of which were released to the market.

The first facelift of the Pars was designed in the mid-2000s. Iran Khodro redesigned the front end with larger headlights and a new bumper and grille, and at the rear, the design of the rear bumper and taillights was changed, taking influence from the BMW 7 Series (E65). This project was known as the Parsian and featured the Iran Khodro logo instead of the Peugeot logo. Ultimately, this project did not reach production for unknown reasons.

In July 2023, The Peugeot Pars received a facelift due to not being able to meet modern standards, IKCO used the front bumper from the IKCO Arisun, a product made by the same manufacturer. They also managed to just barely fit a daylight system on the new Pars, they removed the plastic protection pieces from the car's body to make it look and seem more modern. The car this time around, was also equipped with more features such as a DRL System, Electronic stability control, Gear Shift Indicator screen. The car was also offered with IKCO's new powertrain, the PSA TU5P (EC5 In Europe), as well as a Euro 5 version of the PSA XU7P. images of this facelift was met with very negative feedback and its production was canceled.

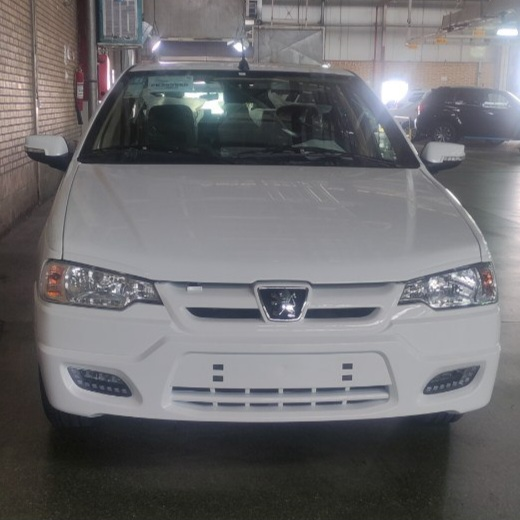
2023 Peugeot Pars (facelift)

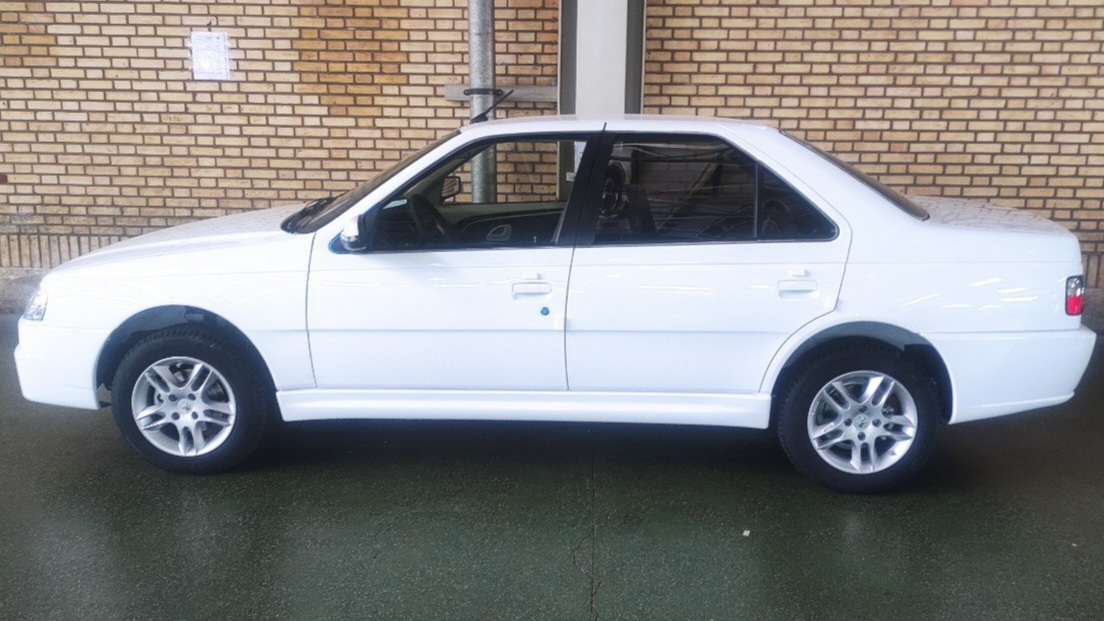
Side view

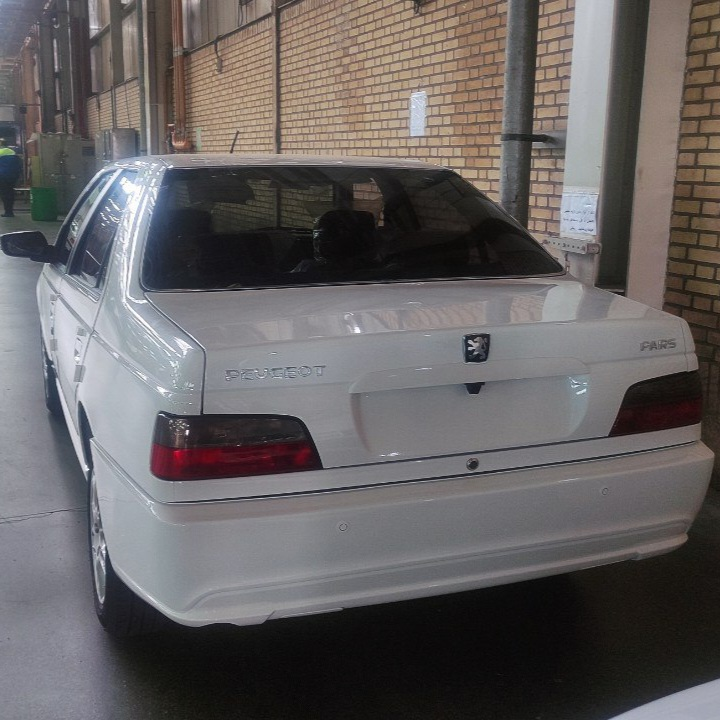
Rear view

== Engines ==
The following variants are, or were, available:

- Pars/Pars BiFuel (1.8L XU7 L3 engine, 8 Valve, 100 BHp/73 kW, 153 Nm/112 ft-lb (Pars), 83 BHp/61 kW, 135 Nm/99 ft-lb (Pars BiFuel))
- Pars LX, Pars automatic and Pars ELX-TU5 (1.6L TU5 Engine, 16 Valve, 105 BHp/77 kW, 142 Nm/104 ft-lb)
- Pars 16V and Pars ELX (1.8L XU7 L4 Engine, 16 Valve, 110 BHp/80 kW, 155 Nm/114 ft-lb)
- Pars ELX XUM (2.0L XUM Engine, 8 Valve, 105 BHp/77 kW, 155Nm/112 ft-lb)
- ELX XU7P (1.8L XU7P Engine, 8 Valve, 97 BHp/71 kW, 146 Nm/107 ft-lb)

The PSA-borrowed engine is XU7JP (code LFZ, known as L3 in Iran) 1.8 L SOHC with two valves per cylinder capable of producing a maximum power of 101 PS (74 kW) at 6000 rpm and a maximum torque of 153 Nm (15.6 kgf m / 113 ft·lbf) at 3000 rpm which is controlled by the SAGEM SL96 ECU. The same engine was already in use in various PSA Peugeot Citroën passenger cars.

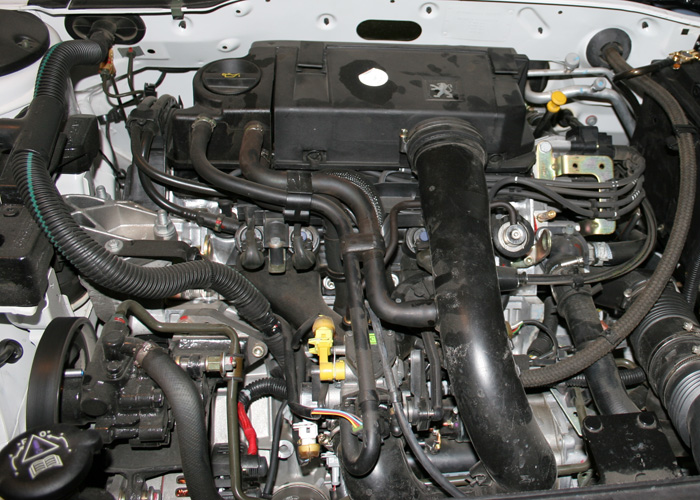
1.8 8V L3

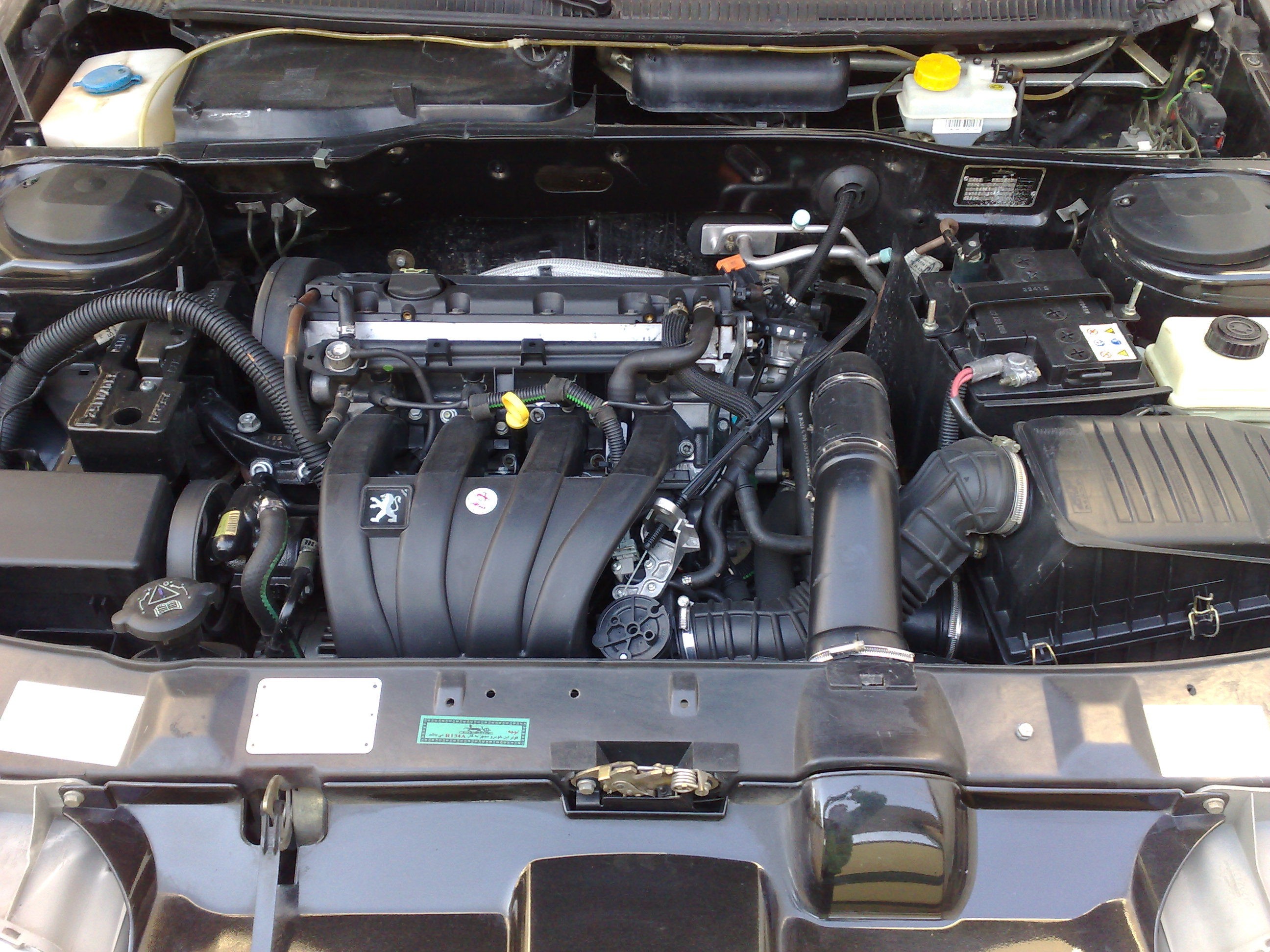
ELX LFY

== See also ==
- Automotive industry in Iran
