= Crouse =

Crouse is a surname. Notable people with the surname include:

- Buck Crouse (1897–1983), American catcher in Major League Baseball
- David Crouse (born 1971), short story writer and teacher
- Deriek Crouse, a police officer murdered at the Virginia Polytechnic Institute and State University in 2011
- George W. Crouse (1832–1912), U.S. Representative from Ohio
- Hans Crouse (born 1998), American baseball player
- Jeff Crouse, American artist and creative technologist
- Jennifer Crouse (born 1977), American basketball player
- Karen Crouse, American journalist and author
- Lawson Crouse, (born 1997), Canadian ice hockey player
- Lindsay Crouse (born 1948), American actress
- Lindsay and Crouse, Howard Lindsay and Russel Crouse, American writers of plays and musicals
- Lloyd Crouse (1918–2007) Canadian businessman and politician
- Nolan Crouse (born 1953), Canadian businessman and politician, mayor of St. Albert, Alberta 2007–2017
- Richard Crouse (born 1963), Canadian television personality
- Russel Crouse (1893–1966), American playwright and librettist
- Timothy Crouse, American journalist and writer
- Wayne Crouse (1924–2000), viola professor emeritus at the University of Oklahoma

== See also ==
- Crouse, North Carolina
- Crouse Creek, a stream in Utah
- Crouseville, Maine
- The Crouse Library for Publishing Arts, New York
- Couse, a similar surname
