= Wallyscar =

Tunisian car manufacturer

- Industry: Automotive
- Founded: 2006; 20 years ago
- Headquarters: Tunis, Tunisia
- Production output: 600
- Owner: Zied Guiga, Omar Guiga
- Number of employees: 120 (2022)
- Website: www.wallyscar.com

Wallyscar is a Tunisian car manufacturer, founded in 2006 and based in Ben Arous. Production is 600 units per year. Wallyscar vehicles are mostly used and present in Africa, Europe and the Middle East. The company sells in Panama, France, Spain, Qatar and Morocco. Wallyscar cooperates with the French automobile company Peugeot, using a PSA 1.4-litre petrol engine in their vehicles. The company was founded by Zied Guiga. The company lays claims to importance to compliance with European standards, and focuses mainly on the idea of vehicles as recyclable and making noise. Corresponding parts suppliers are Citroën, Peugeot, VDO and UTAC. In the vehicle identification number, the Company uses the manufacturer code CL9.

== Products ==
=== Wally Izis ===
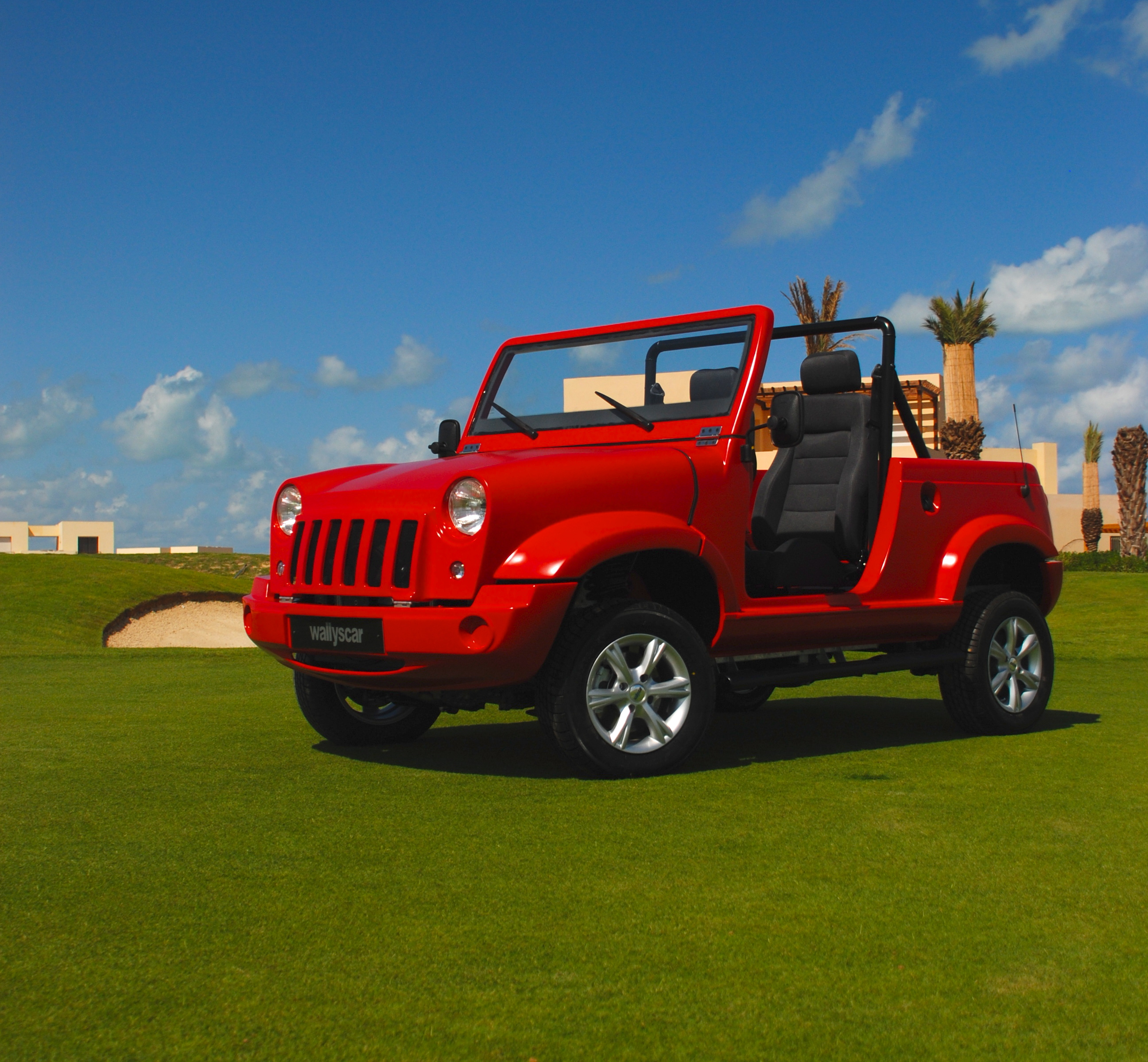
Wallys Izis

The first model of the manufacturer Wallyscar, the Wallys Izis is, since 19 October 2008, in so-called CKD assembly assembled. The Izis is available per request without doors or two open-door mini SUV, in the style of the Italian Lawil S.p.A. and the Swiss Diavolino. Responsible for the design was the Tunisian design company HH Design. The vehicle was named after the Wallis and Futuna island in the Pacific Ocean.

The only available engine for the Izis is a gasoline engine, a PSA Peugeot Citroën TU3A. With inline four cylinders, a displacement of 1360 cc and two valves per cylinder power, this engine produces 55.2 kW. The turning radius is 9.2 meters. From the factory, the Izis is available in over 100 finishes, with the possibility for customers to choose between a range of different accessories such as various steering wheels, interior trim and built-in appliances. The model is available so far only in Tunisia, Morocco, France and Panama . The Euro NCAP awarded the Izis 2 stars.

Between 2008 and 2013, 2,000 Izis have been produced, and 80% of them have been exported outside of Tunisia.

In 2014, Wallyscar announced that Wallys Izis is at the end of its production in preparation of the release of a new model, the Wallys Iris.

=== Wally Iris ===
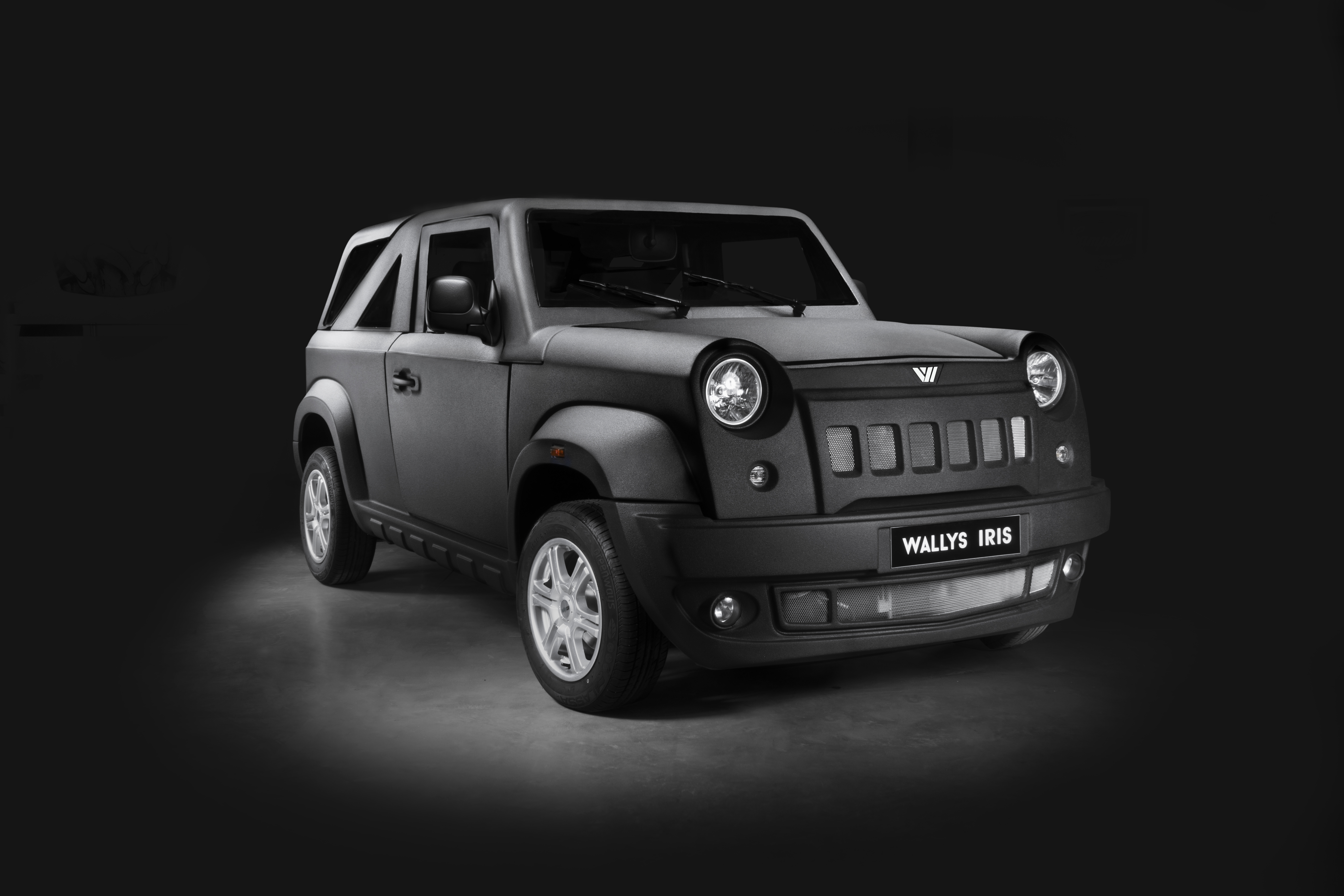
Wallys Iris

In March 2017, Wallyscar started commercializing a second car, which is Iris , with a price of 35,900 Tunisian dinar (nearly 12,600 euro). Its standard configuration is basic but Wallys offers a wide range of options. These include LED headlamps and foglamps, reversing camera and radar as well as a central touch-screen.

=== Wallys 619 ===
In 2021, the manufacturer released the Wallys 619, a rebadged and modified version of the Saipa 111.

=== Wallys 216 ===
At the beginning of 2022, Wallyscar released the 216, definitely, the pick-up version of the Wallyscar 619, rebadged of Saipa 151.

=== Wallyscar App ===
In September 2022, Wallyscar introduced its new mobile application, WALLYSCAR, which includes all of the brand's models and its new products in preview.

=== Wallys 719 ===
In December 2022, Wallyscar launched the Wallys 719, a rebadged and slightly modified IKCO Runna.

=== Wallys Wolf ===
In July 2023, Wallyscar presented its latest SUV production called 'Wolf'. In terms of design, this model moves beyond the traditional Wallyscar's style. Accordingly, the rear of the SUV features four tailpipies and an aerodynamic diffuser. Its plunging hood overlooks a low grille. Also, the SUV's interior is made from recycled polyester, polyamide and semi-aniline leather.

== See also ==
- List of automobile manufacturers
- Economy of Tunisia
