= IKCO EF engines =

IKCO EF Engines
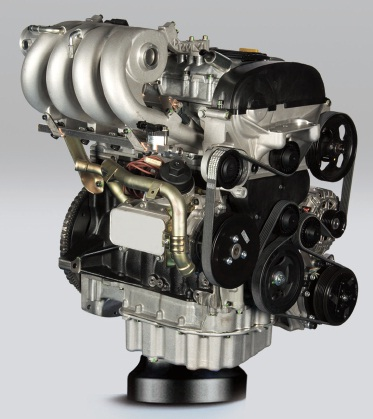

Overview
- Manufacturer: Iran Khodro
- Also called: National engine
- Production: 2008–present

Layout
- Configuration: Straight-4
- Displacement: 1.6 L (1,645 cc) EF7; 1.5 L (1,497 cc) EFD; 1.4 L (1,397 cc) EF4
- Cylinder bore: 78.56 mm (3.09 in); 76 mm (2.99 in)
- Piston stroke: 85 mm (3.35 in); 82.5 mm (3.25 in)
- Cylinder block material: Cast iron
- Cylinder head material: Aluminium
- Valvetrain: DOHC
- Compression ratio: 11:1 - 16.5:1

Combustion
- Turbocharger: Single & Twin
- Fuel system: MPFI, Diesel Direct Injection & CNG Direct Injection (From late 2011)
- Fuel type: Petrol, CNG & Diesel
- Oil system: Wet sump
- Cooling system: Water cooling

Output
- Power output: 115 PS (85 kW) - 160 PS (118 kW)
- Torque output: 111 N⋅m (82 lb⋅ft) - 300 N⋅m (221 lb⋅ft)

IKCO EF Engines (also known as National Engines) are a family of straight-four engines produced by the Iranian car manufacturer Iran Khodro (IKCO). The first engines in this family, the EF7 series, were designed jointly by Iran Khodro Powertrain Company (IPCO) and F.E.V GmbH of Germany. The later models were designed by IPCO alone. IPCO is the powertrain design and production company of IKCO.

The first phase of the IKCO EF Engines project, the EF7 dual-fuel, had an estimated cost of US$80,000,000 and aimed to supply 800,000 powertrains by 2010.

Most EF engines share a set of common parts. The EF4 and EF7 are bi-fuel engines that primarily use compressed natural gas (CNG) but can also operate on gasoline. The EFD is a single-fuel diesel engine.

The EF family dual-fuel and petrol-fuel engines have achieved the Euro IV emission standard and can achieve the Euro V emission standard with some minor changes. EFD will be the first engine of the family already conforming to Euro IV emission standard at initial release, and will be capable of attaining the Euro VI emission standard with alterations.

Some prominent suppliers for EF engines are INA for critical variable valve timing (VVT) and other mechanical parts; MAHLE, which supplies some integral components of the engine family such as pistons; and Bosch, which supplies the ECU, electrically controlled pedal (Drive by wire), and many other sensitive electronic parts. All parts (except high-tech and sensitive parts) from worldwide companies are produced in Iran under license.

== EF7 and EF7+ ==
The EF7s' general structure is similar to the PSA Group's Peugeot TU5JP4, having a 16-valve engine incorporating CVVT technology on its intake valves (IPS type) with a displacement of 1645cc, a bore of 78.560mm, and a stroke of 85mm. It was introduced as EF7 dual-fuel in 2008 at Engine Expo Stuttgart, Germany.

The engine features both a lubrication and liquid-cooling system. Its direct-drive oil pump, water pump, oil pump, and oil coolant systems are carefully arranged to reduce the need for removal of parts during maintenance. Other parts are engineered to ease oil filter changes. The EF7 uses a three-way Catalytic Converter to reach higher emission standards.

All EF7 variants have passed the NVH tests on their head cylinder and cylinder block. The engines also have a blow-by system which provides ventilation for the crankcase and oil pan.

The EF7 assembly line is in Tehran, Iran.

=== EF7-NA (Dual-Fuel) ===
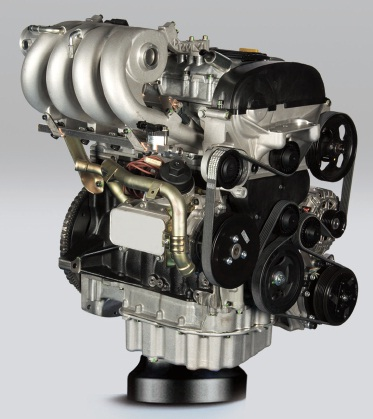
EF7 Dual-Fuel engine (Rear view)

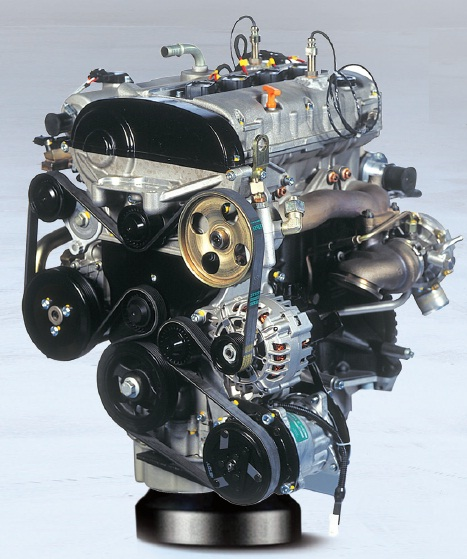
EF7 Dual-Fuel engine (Front view) Without intake manifold

The EF7-NA reaches its maximum power output at 6,000 rpm and maximum torque at 3500 rpm while using either CNG or petrol.

IKCO has indicated an engine timing belt change interval of 180,000 km. IKCO states that if the engine runs only on CNG, it will not need any special maintenance until 250,000 km (on average). Alternatively, if the engine runs on both CNG and gasoline, timing belt mileage will increase to more than 250,000 km.

Due to challenges in feasibility, numerous requests for single-fuel Samand with EF7 engines and petrol-based EF7 engines could not be met. In late 2009, IKCO wanted IPCO to start a project to remove CNG-necessary engine parts. Thus, the project was completed in about 3 months, and the tests were completed in the second quarter of 2010. Only the ECU program is changed in this engine version, and CNG functions are disabled. This ECU program supports immobilizers, too. Currently, consumers can purchase the Samand with a single-fuel EF7 engine.

In September 2010, IKCO announced the design and production of a modified EF7 engine with reduced fuel consumption and air pollution. The engine was envisioned to use direct fuel injection technology for both petrol and CNG, which would have made IKCO the first manufacturer in the world to employ this technology for CNG engines.

==== Technical details ====
- ECU: Bosch Calibration: ME 7.4.9NG- FC34ME - Siemens Calibration: SIM2K-48VR
- Coil ignition: Bosch P-50
- Spark plugs: Bosch FR8DE+ - Denso K20PR-U
- Gasoline Fuel Injectors:Bosch
- CNG Fuel Injectors: Bosch
- CNG Fuel Rail: BENTLER
- Gasoline Fuel Rail: BENTLER
- Upstream Oxygen Sensor: Bosch LS7342
- Downstream Oxygen Sensor: Bosch LS7342
- TMAP Sensor: Bosch 230042
- Accelerator Pedal: Bosch
- Recommended Fuel: Normal CNG & Unleaded Gasoline RON 95
- Recommended Engine Lubricant: 7000 Semi-Synthetic (10W-40 SL) or Behran Rakhsh 10\40
- 0W-40 SL)
- Timing Belt: INA
- Alternator Belt: INA
- Idlers Pulleys: INA
- HLA Tappets: INA
- Check Valve: INA
- Automatic Tensioner: INA
- CVVT Mechanism Parts: INA
- CVVT Control Valve: INA
- IPS Tensioner Valve: INA
- CVVT Closing Plug: INA
- Steel Pulley: INA
- Intake Valves: TBD
- Exhaust Valves: TBD
- Engine Starter: Valeo
- Engine Alternator: Valeo
- Flywheel: TBD
- Clutch Kit: Valeo
- Pistons: MAHLE
- Cylinder head: Continental Engines Ltd
- Intake Manifold: Continental Engines Ltd
- Engine Housings: Tara Zob Company
- Engine Mounters: TBD
- Weight: 140 kg

===== Parts image gallery =====
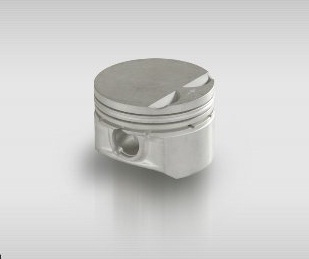
EF7 Dual-Fuel engine piston

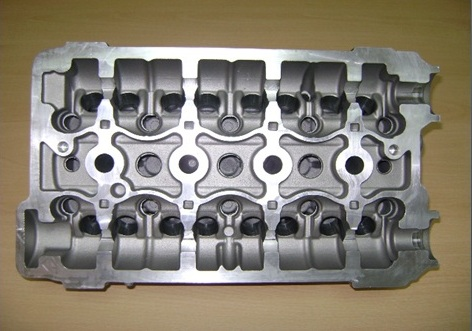
EF7 Cylinder head

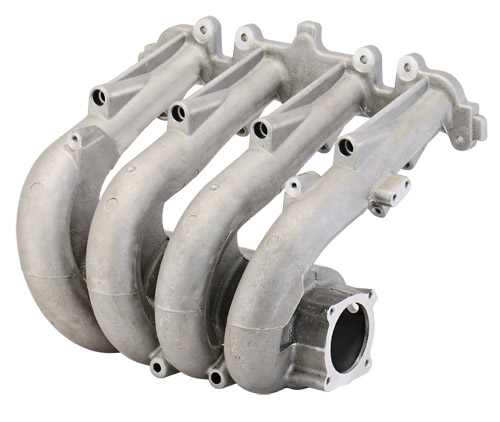
EF7 Intake Manifold

=== EF7 turbocharged (TC7) ===
A new variant of the EF7 family was introduced in 2009 with a turbocharger and named EF7-TC or TC7. It is installed on the Soren ELX and Dena Plus.

To resist the high temperature of engine combustion, about 35 kg of nickel is used in the cylinder block alloy.

In addition, a new lubricant will be produced for the engine by the Behran Oil company.

IP-Co has estimated the engine's life cycle to be around 5 years.

=== EF7 petrol-based ===
An EF7 project manager has confirmed rumors of an upcoming gasoline-only EF7.

The development team plans to reduce the new model's engine compression from the 11:1 ratio of earlier models to 10.5:1 and replace temperature-resistant CNG parts with weaker, low-cost gasoline-grade parts.

In addition, the petrol-based EF7 will use a newer ECU program and functions.

The engine output is estimated to be between 118 PS (87 kW)-126 PS (93 kW)

It is expected that the engine will be shown to the public in mid-2011.

=== EF7 Plus ===
The EF7 Plus (or EF7+) series of engines reduces fuel consumption and pollution emission from Euro IV to Euro V standard.

The series include the EF7+ NA (or EF7P-NA) and the EF7+ TC (or EF7P-TC or TC7+).

=== Performance ===
Model	Power	Torque	Production since	Utilisation on	Compression Ratio	FC(Urban)	FC(Combined)	FC(Extra Urban)	Notes
EF7-NA	Petrol: 112 PS (82 kW); CNG: 100 PS (74 kW) at 6000 rpm	Petrol: 151 N⋅m (111 lb⋅ft); CNG: 134 N⋅m (99 lb⋅ft); 3500-4500 rpm	Early 2009	Samand; Soren; Dena; Dena Plus	11:1	8.9 L, 7Kg*	7.5 L, 5.6 kg	4.9 L 3.9 kg	Bi-fuel (petrol-CNG), Euro IV 16-valve, DOHC, HLA Tappets, CVVT, MPFI, Catalytic converter
EF7-TC	149 PS (110 kW) at 5500 rpm	215 N⋅m (159 lb⋅ft); 2000-4500 rpm	Late 2010	Soren; Dena Plus	9.8:1	TBD	7.3 L, 5.4 kg	TBD	Bi-fuel (petrol-CNG), Euro IV 16-valve, DOHC, HLA Tappets, MPFI, Turbocharger, Catalytic converter
EF7P-NA	Petrol: 113 PS (83 kW); CNG: ? at 6000 rpm	Petrol: 153 N⋅m (113 lb⋅ft); CNG: ? at 3500 rpm	Late 2024	Dena Plus	10.8:1		6.8 L		Euro V
EF7P-TC	Petrol: 163 PS (120 kW); CNG: ? at 5000 rpm	Petrol: 240 N⋅m (177 lb⋅ft); CNG: ? 1600-4500 rpm	Late 2024	Reera Dena Plus IKCO Tara	9.1:1		6.8 L		Euro V

== EF4 ==
The EF4 has displacement of 1397 cc with a bore of TBD mm and a stroke of TBD mm. The engine was introduced to the public in 2009 in Iran. It uses the EF7 cylinder head.

The engine reaches maximum power at 6000 rpm and maximum torque at 3250 rpm for both CNG and petrol.

It shares almost all of its technologies with its predecessor, EF7.

The EF4 assembly line will be in Esfahan, Iran.

The EF4 engine never made it to production nor was it installed in any vehicle.

=== Performance ===
Model	Power	Torque	Utilisation on	Compression Ratio	FC(Urban)	FC(Combined)	FC(Extra Urban)	Notes
EF4-NA	Petrol: 103 PS (76 kW); CNG: 84 PS (62 kW) at 6000 rpm	Petrol: 125 N⋅m (92 lb⋅ft); CNG: 110 N⋅m (81 lb⋅ft); 3500-4500 rpm	Runna (it stopped)	11:1	8.4 L, 6.5 kg	6.9 L, 5.1 kg	4.7 L, 3.7 kg	Bi-fuel (petrol-CNG), Euro V 16-valve, DOHC, HLA Tappets, CVVT, MPFI, Catalytic converter
EF4-TC	Petrol: 129 PS (95 kW); CNG: ? at 6000 rpm	Petrol: 190 N⋅m (140 lb⋅ft); CNG: ? 3500-4500 rpm				6.8 L		Bi-fuel (petrol-CNG), Euro V

== EFD engines ==
EFD diesel engines have a displacement of 1497 cc with a bore of 76 mm and a stroke of 82.5 mm.

The engines have a 16-valve design and feature a range of new diesel engine technologies.

NIOPDC has been the main sponsor of the EFD engine since it began in mid 2008 and has poured as much as US$20,000,000 into its development.

Due to the inefficiencies of the Peugeot BE3/5 gearbox and the need for a new gearbox for other IKCO engines, the company has started designing a new gearbox for the EFD engines. This new gearbox will handle higher torque and offer greater efficiency compared to the BE3/5. On November 30, 2010, IKCO announced they would finalise the gear ratios of the new gearbox for EFD soon.

Because EFD engines are the first from the EF family to use alternative fuel, they feature many unique, original parts. Iran Khodro and the IP-Co have partnered with AVL to learn to manufacture many of these new technologies.

New features of EFD engines include:

- Direct injection
- Common rail with a pressure of 1,600 bars (23,210 psi)
- Glow plug
- Variable geometry turbocharger
- Intercooler
- Exhaust gas recirculation with cooler to meet higher pollution standards
- Diesel Oxidation Catalyst to meet higher emission standard by breaking down pollutants of exhaust gas into less harmful elements.
- Other new technologies designed to meet Euro IV emission standard
- Diesel Particulate Filter to remove diesel soot and particulates from exhaust gas

=== EFD-NA ===
The EFD-NA (natural aspiration), unveiled on November 17, 2009, by the president of Iran Mahmoud Ahmadinejad in Amol, is the first EFD-variant engine to be mobilized.

The engine reaches its maximum power at 4000 rpm and maximum torque at 1750 rpm.

It is currently installed on some Samands and Sorens and is undergoing final testing.

Other specifications are listed in the Performance section below.

=== EFD turbocharged ===
IP-Co has plans to make a double-stage turbocharged engine.

IP-Co will not begin development on the new engine until its counterpart, the EFD engine, comes to market.

=== Performance ===
Model	Power	Torque	Compression Ratio	Maximum Combustion Chamber Pressure	Redline	Max rpm	FC(Combined)	Notes
EFD-NA	122 PS (90 kW) @ 4000 rpm	256 N⋅m (189 lb⋅ft) @ 1750 rpm	16.5:1	165 bar	4500 rpm	5500 rpm	5 L	Diesel, Euro V 16-valve, DOHC, HLA Tappets, Direct Injection, Common Rail, Turbodiesel, VGT, InterCooler, Glow Plug, EGR, DPF, DOC
EFD-TC	149 PS (110 kW) @ TBD rpm	300 N⋅m (221 lb⋅ft) @ TBD rpm	TBD	TBD	TBD rpm	TBD rpm	TBD	Diesel, Euro V 16-valve, DOHC, HLA Tappets, Direct Injection, Common Rail, 2 x Turbodiesel, VGT, InterCooler, Glow Plug, EGR, DPF, DOC

== See also ==
- Automotive industry in Iran
- Natural gas vehicle
- Petrol engine
- Internal combustion engine
- Diesel engine
- Turbodiesel
- Diesel fuel
