= IKCO Soren =

Iran Khodro automobile

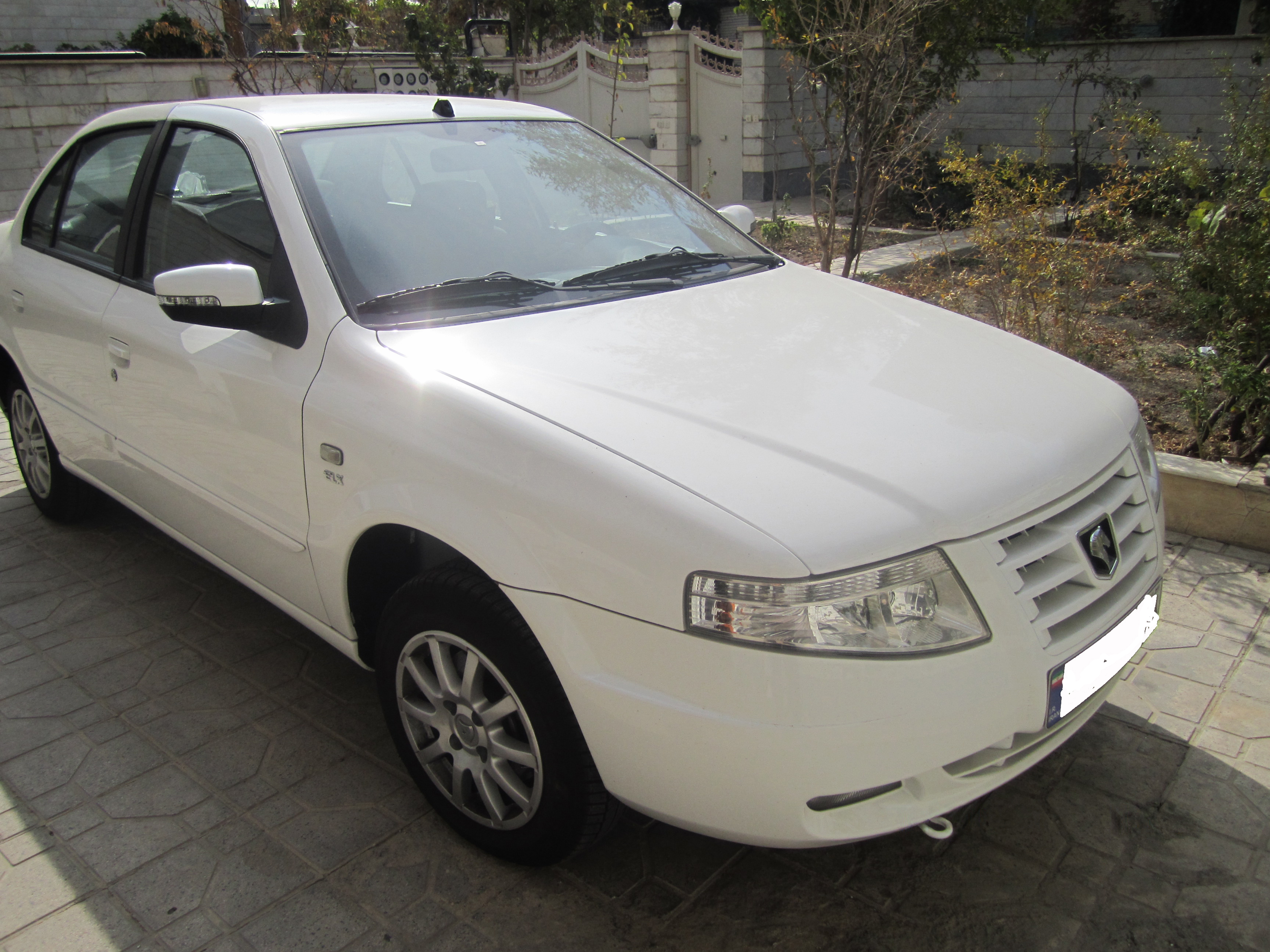
- IKCO Soren ELX

Overview
- Manufacturer: Iran Khodro
- Model code: P2
- Also called: Samand Soren; Soren Plus
- Production: 2007–2019 (Soren); 2020–present (Soren Plus)
- Model years: 2007–2019 (Soren); 2020–present (Soren Plus)
- Assembly: Iran: Tehran; Azerbaijan: Neftchala (Khazar); Belarus: Apchak (Unison); China: Tai'an (Youngman)

Body and chassis
- Class: Compact Sedan
- Body style: 4-door saloon
- Layout: Front engine, Front-wheel drive
- Platform: Peugeot 405 platform
- Related: Peugeot 405; Peugeot Pars; IKCO Samand

Powertrain
- Engine: 1.8 L XU7JP/L3 I4; 1.8 L XU7P I4; 1.6 L TU5JP4 I4 (certain markets); 1.6 L TU5P I4; 1.7 L EF7 I4; 1.7 L EF7 Euro 5 I4; 1.7 L EF7 Turbocharged I4
- Transmission: 5-speed MT

Dimensions
- Wheelbase: 2,671 mm (105.2 in)
- Length: 4,527 mm (178.2 in)
- Width: 1,720 mm (68 in) (without mirrors)
- Height: 1,460 mm (57 in)
- Curb weight: 1,220 kg (2,690 lb) (For XU7 engine) 1,200 kg (2,600 lb) (For TU5) 1,274 kg (2,809 lb) (For single-fuel EF7 Engine)

Chronology
- Predecessor: IKCO Samand
- Successor: IKCO Dena

The IKCO Samand Soren is a compact sedan manufactured by Iran Khodro (IKCO). It is a facelifted and upper end version of the IKCO Samand, first released in February 7 of 2007 It is named after Surena, an ancient Parthian Spahbed (general).

== Samand Soren ELX ==
The Samand Soren ELX was a facelifted version of the Samand Soren, released in 2008. It came with a number of new safety options including ESP (optional, non standard) and a front passenger airbag. It also came with a new interior design, including a new dashboard and instrument cluster. Its electrical systems were fully digitized.

There were three available engines for the Samand Soren ELX:

- Peugeot TU5JP4 (Limited to certain markets)
- EF7
- EF7 Turbocharged (Discontinued after 2019)

== Build Quality Concerns ==
Consumer reports have highlighted significant build quality issues with the Soren, reflecting systemic problems across Iran's automotive industry. According to Iran Standards and Quality Inspection Company (ISQI) rankings, none of the cars made by IKCO received more than four stars out of five, with persistent complaints about slow deliveries, lack of after-sales services, and low production quality. The Soren specifically suffers from poor assembly quality with excessive cabin noise, particularly from the seats. For decades, Iranian consumers have expressed growing discontent with state-owned carmakers accused of exploiting an uncompetitive market and producing cars with fewer features and worse build quality. Common failures in the SOREN Plus reported at relatively low mileages include: front wheel bearings, window regulators that burn out (particularly in rainy climates), frequently failing brake and indicator lights, and daytime running lights. The head of Iran's Institute of Standards stated that in the last eight years, no high-quality vehicles have been produced in Iran, with domestic cars showing gaps five times higher than foreign brands due to reusing worn molds. Clutch quality has been specifically cited as problematic, with one owner reporting replacement at just 10,000 km, while control arm bushings have failed as early as 15,000 km. Iran's traffic police chief publicly questioned the industry, asking "What kinds of cars do we have? Why do we produce death wagons?" highlighting concerns about shoddy engineering.

== Soren Plus ==
A facelifted replacement for the Soren was revealed back in 2020 referred to as "The Soren Sal/Year Edition" which was then renamed to the Soren Plus when it entered production in 2021. The Plus variation is considered the second facelift of the Samand family and is also the successor to the Soren and Soren ELX.

in comparison to the Soren ELX the Plus comes with a euro 5 variation of the same EF7 engine that was euro 4 in the Soren ELX, it's also more equipped in comparison, being offered with extra features such as a cruise control system, tinted rear windows and a revised trip computer system, IKCO also has started offering the Plus version with extra (optional and not standard) features such as a multi media screen and a rear view camera since 2022.

As of 2026 there are 3 different engines/powertrains and 4 different main configurations and models of the Soren Plus available for the public:

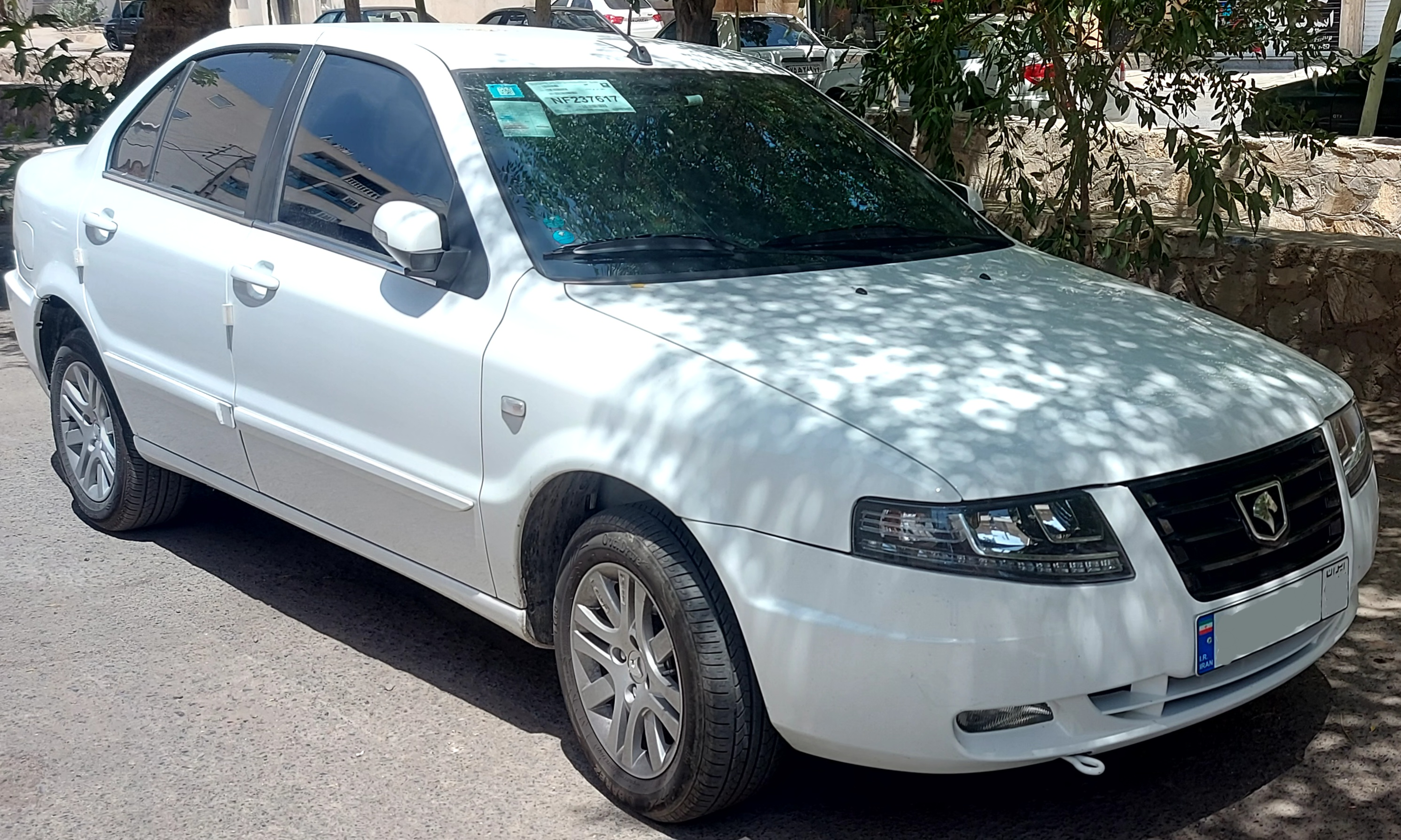
IKCO Soren Plus (front)

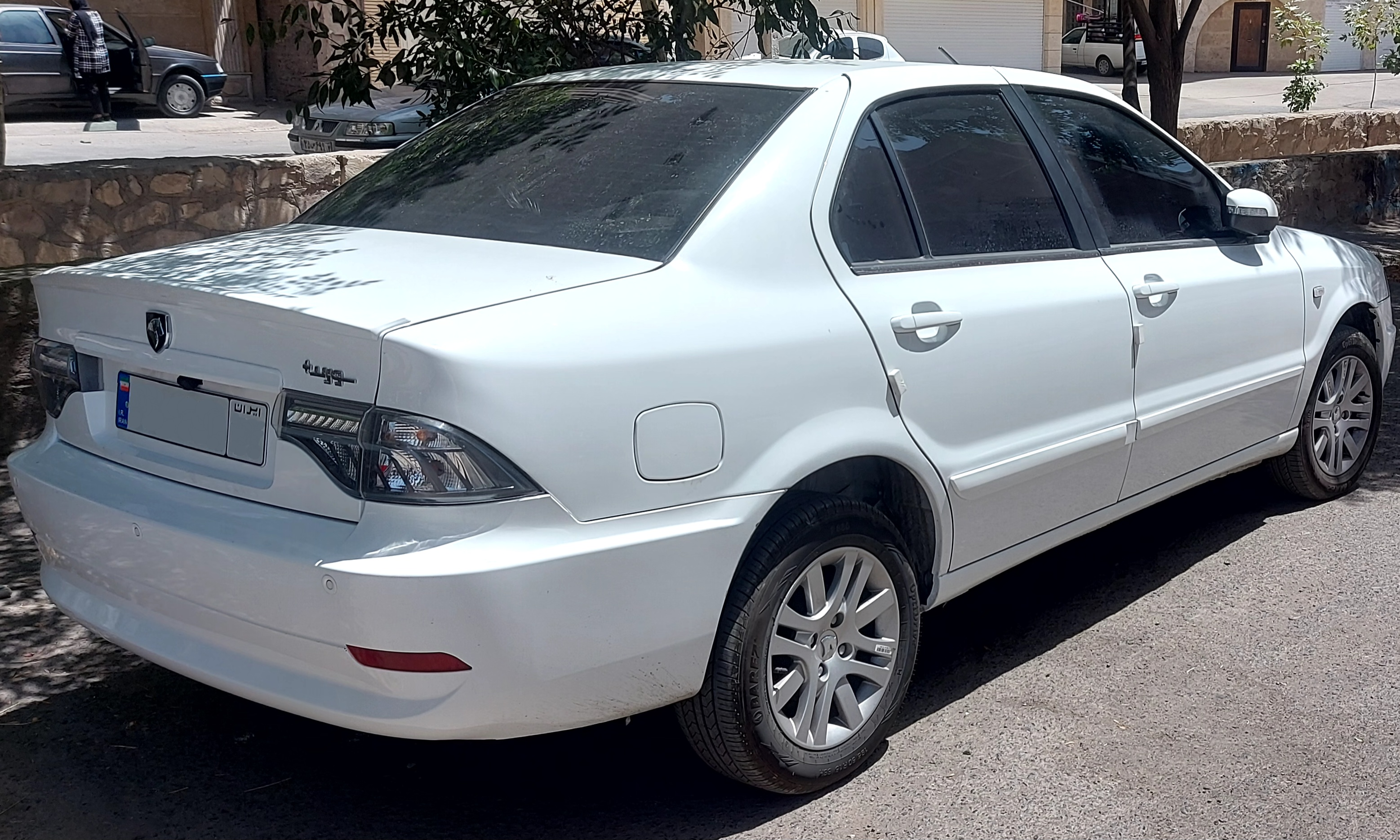
IKCO Soren Plus (rear)

=== Engines ===
- EF7 (Euro 5): 1.7L Naturally Aspirated 16 Valve Inline Four, 113 HP (83 Kw), 153 Nm (112 ft-lb)
- XU7P (Euro 5): 1.8L Naturally Aspirated 8 Valve Inline Four, 98 HP (72 Kw), 146 Nm (107 ft-lb)
- TU5P (Euro 5): 1.6L Naturally Aspirated 16 Valve Inline Four, 113 HP (83 Kw), 144 Nm (106 ft-lb)

=== Models ===
- EF7 Gasoline version: Originally the base model of the Plus, comes with the 1.7L Euro 5 EF7.
- EF7 BiFuel version: Essentially the same as the EF7 Gasoline model but with a BiFuel CNG + Gasoline configuration instead which comes with a 100L CNG tank, decreasing the trunk storage displacement from a claimed 500 Litres to 350 Litres instead. (only offered since 2022)
- XU7P Gasoline version: Essentially the EF7 Gasoline model but with the 1.8L XU7P 8 Valve Inline Four, considered the new base model (only offered since 2023)
- TU5P Gasoline Version: Essentially the EF7 Gasoline model but with the 1.6L TU5P 16 Valve Inline Four, considered the upper end model only offered since 2026)
