= Couse =

Surname disambiguation

Couse is a surname, and may refer to:

- Dave Couse, Irish singer and songwriter
- E. Irving Couse (1866–1936), American artist
- Kenton Couse (1721–1790), British architect

== See also ==
- Crouse, a similar surname
