= Karen Crouse =

American journalist and author

- Education: University of Southern California
- Occupation: Journalist
- Years active: 2005-present
- Employer: The New York Times

Karen Crouse is an American journalist and author.

== Education ==
Crouse received a BA in Journalism and Physical Education from the University of Southern California. She earned a varsity letter in swimming while at USC.

== Career ==
Crouse began her career at Swimming World, and later at the Savannah News-Press, where she was the first woman in its sports department. She then worked at The Palm Beach Post and the Los Angeles Daily News before joining The New York Times in 2005 as a sports reporter.

Crouse has been named among the top 10 beat reporters in the US by the Associated Press Sports Editors association. She was also a finalist at the NSMA Awards in 2016 for National Sportswriter of the Year.

In 2018, Crouse authored the book Norwich: One Tiny Vermont Town's Secret to Happiness and Excellence, published by Simon and Schuster.

Crouse was named international sports correspondent for The New York Times in October 2019.

In July 2021, she was set to cover the Summer Olympics in Tokyo for The Times but was taken off the swimming beat and suspended when she failed to disclose her deal to write a book with American swimmer Michael Phelps. Her arrangement to be a ghostwriter on a book violated the newspaper's conflict of interest policy. She later resigned.
