= IKCO Samand =

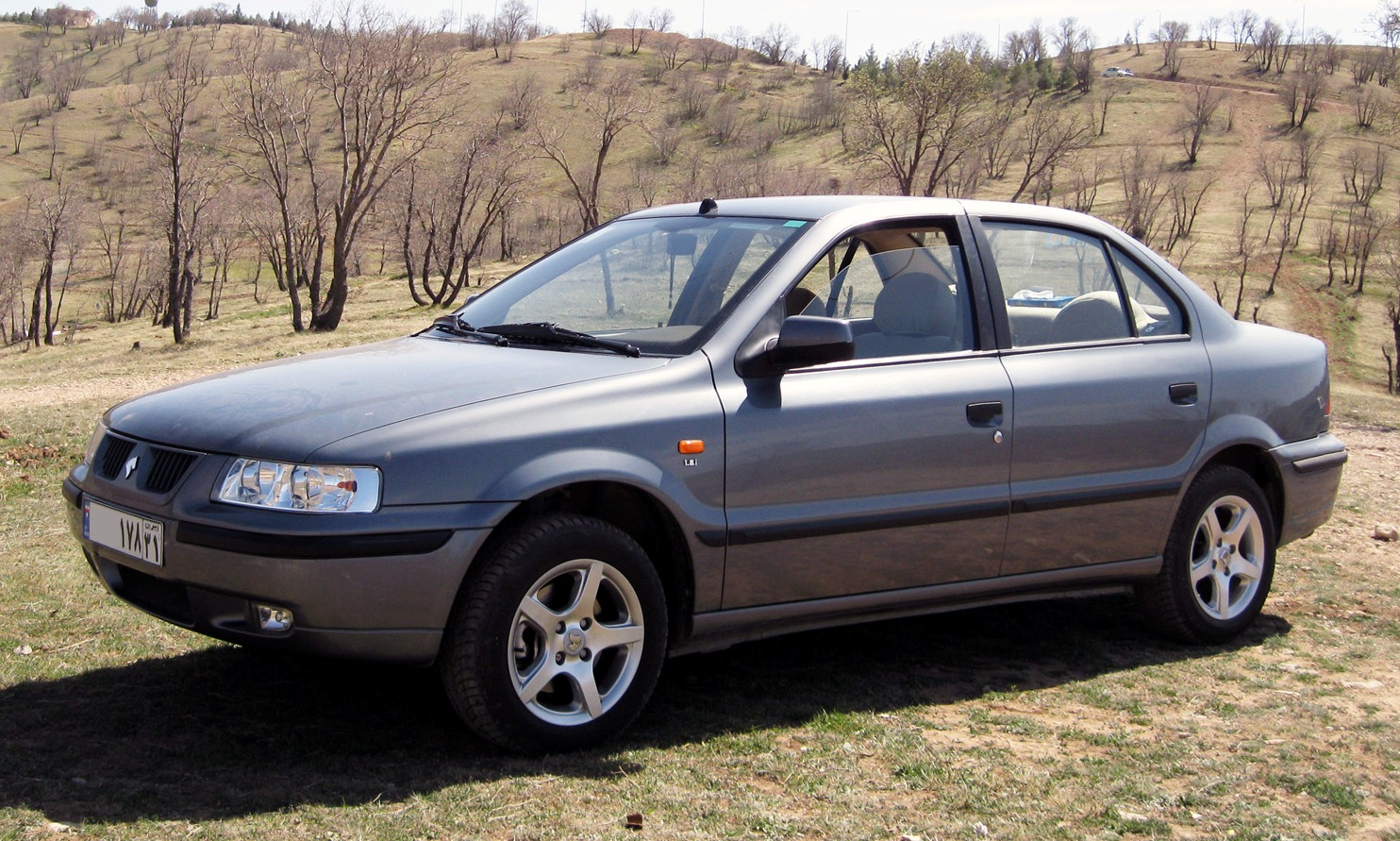
- IKCO Samand LX

Overview
- Manufacturer: Iran Khodro
- Model code: X7
- Also called: Khazar LX (Azerbaijan); SenIran Samand Mandori (Senegal); Siamco Sham (Syria); Venirauto Centauro (Venezuela)
- Production: 2001–2022
- Assembly: Iran: Tehran; Azerbaijan: Shamakhi (AzSamand); Belarus: Apchak (Unison); Senegal: Thiès (SenIran Auto); Syria: Damascus (Siamco); Venezuela: Maracay (Venirauto)

Body and chassis
- Class: Large family car (D)
- Body style: 4-door saloon
- Layout: Front engine, front-wheel drive
- Platform: Peugeot 405 Platform
- Related: Peugeot 405; Peugeot Pars; IKCO Soren

Powertrain
- Engine: 1.8 L (XU7JP/L3) I4 (100 hp), 1.8 L (XU7JP4/L4) I4 (110 hp), 1.6 L (TU5JP4) I4 (110 hp), 1.7 L (1648 cc) (EF7 Engine) I4 (113 hp).
- Transmission: 5-speed manual

Dimensions
- Wheelbase: 2,671 mm (105.2 in)
- Length: 4,502 mm (177.2 in)
- Width: 1,720 mm (68 in) (without mirrors)
- Height: 1,460 mm (57 in)
- Curb weight: 1,200 kg (2,600 lb) (XU7JP/L3 engine) 1,287 kg (2,837 lb) (XU7JP4/L4 engine); 1,220 kg (2,690 lb) (TU5) 1,360 kg (3,000 lb) (EF7 dual-fuel) 1,274 kg (2,809 lb) (EF7 single-fuel)

Chronology
- Predecessor: Peugeot 405
- Successor: IKCO Soren Plus

The IKCO Samand is a large family car produced by IKCO. Production began in 2001, with the first unit being sold the same year. Considered the national vehicle of Iran, it replaces the Paykan, which was sold from 1967 to 2005.

== Engine and components ==
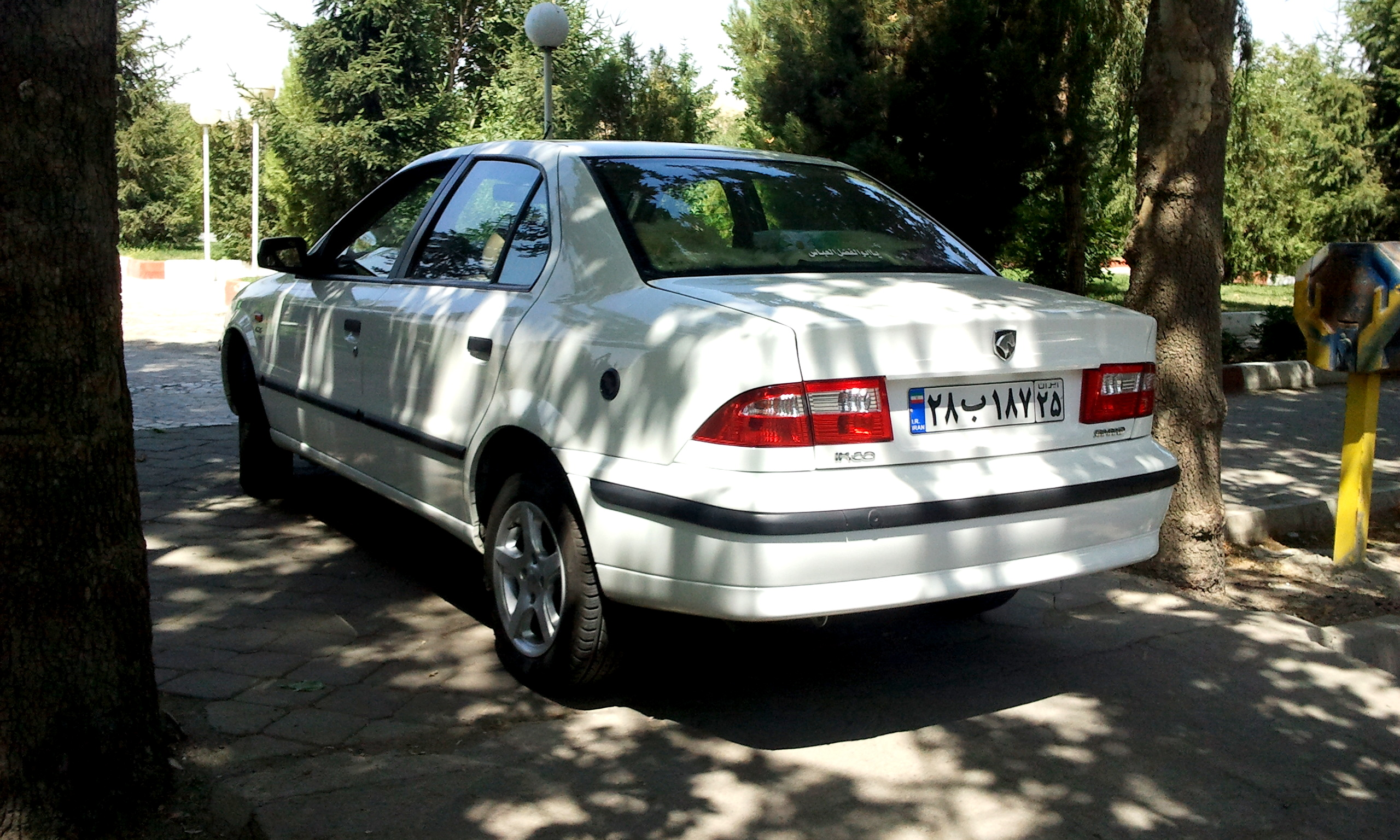
IKCO Samand Rear

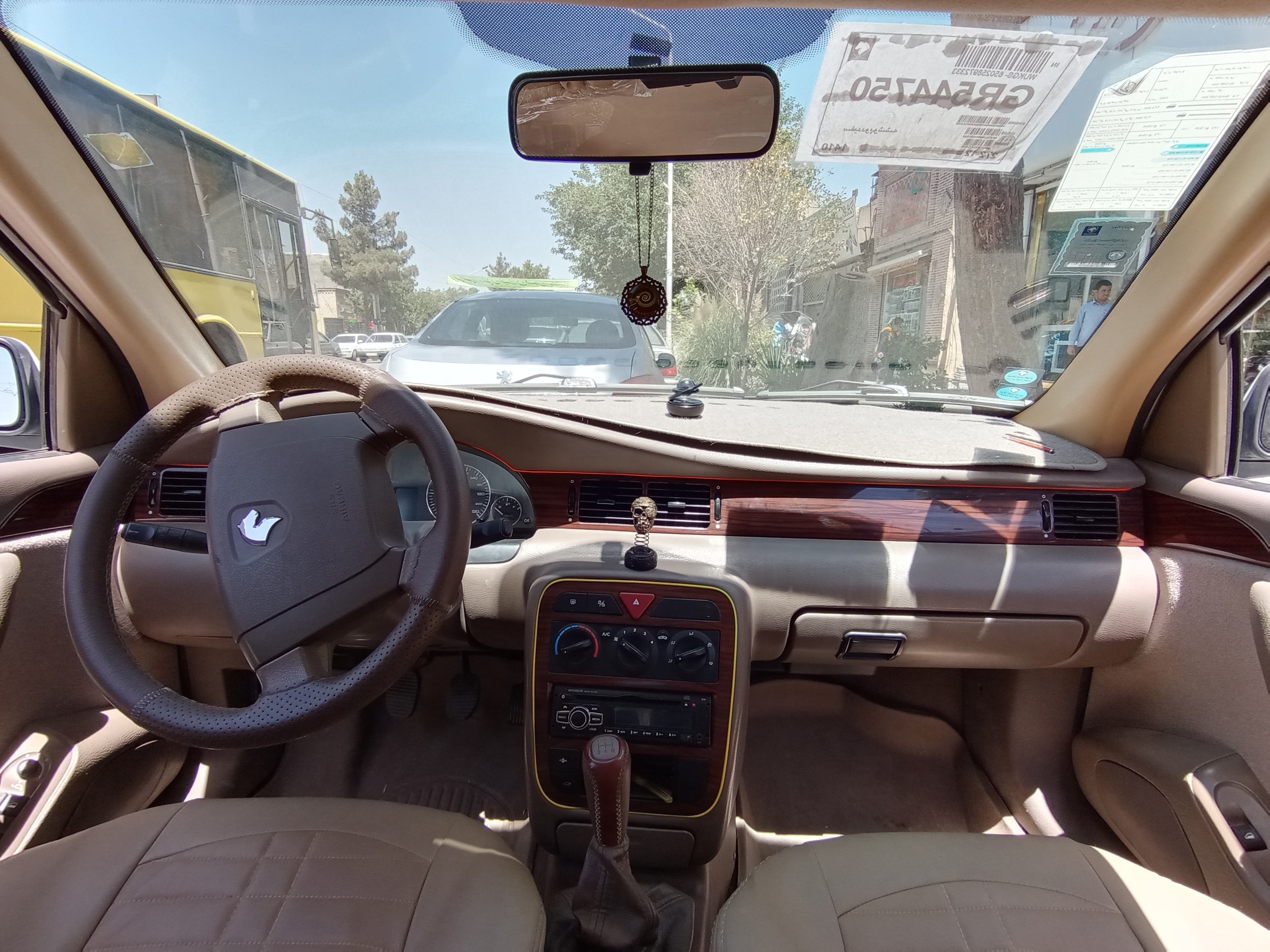
Interior view

The Iranian-designed Samand uses the Peugeot 405 platform, equipped with either IKCO-designed EF7 engines or PSA XU7JP/L3 engines, amongst others. IKCO manufactures 80% of Samand's parts domestically, including its Iranian-designed engine.

For export markets (and also the Iranian market), IKCO uses the Peugeot TU5JP4 engine. This is because the TU5 is a low-consumption and powerful engine, and because of the ease of finding its parts all over Europe, since the TU5 has been used for the Peugeot 206, Peugeot 307 and Peugeot 207. The TU5 version of Samand comes with three new options: driver airbag, pre-tensioner seatbelts, headlight height adjuster and active antenna. The car uses Peugeot 405 components. note that this was only done from 2008 to 2010

Since early 2009, IKCO has used newly developed Iranian engines such as a dual-fuel national engine for its new models (EF7). In mid-2010, IKCO started to install petrol-only EF7 engines on Samand. The engine is not a petrol-based version of EF7 but the compressed natural gas (CNG) parts of the engine are removed and also the engine control unit (ECU) Programming.

== Performance ==
Engine	Fuel Consumption (Petrol)	Fuel Consumption (CNG)	0 – 100 km/h (Petrol)	0 – 100 km/h (CNG)
EF7	9.2 / 7.3 / 5.0	9.0 / 5.4 / 4.0	12.1 s	12 s
TU5JP4	9.2 / 7.2 / 4.9	– / – / –	11.3 s	–
XU7JP/L3	11.3 / 8.5 / 6.1	? / ? / ?	13.1s	12.6 s
XU7JP4/L4	11.1 / 8.4 / 6	– / – / –	9.8s	–

- Fuel consumption ( City / Combined / Highway (90 km/h) Constant )
- CNG fuel consumption numbers are measured in Kg

== Diesel model ==
In 2009, IKCO announced that they will produce Samand with their new engine EFD in 2010; however, due to the required tests for the engine, preparing the car for engine installation, as well as lack of distribution for the Euro IV diesel fuel in the country postponed production to 2011. On November 30, 2010 IKCO announced the major changes made in Samand compared to dual-fuel or single fuel Samands for making it compatible for installing the EFD engine on. This main changes are: changing the radiator, installing the intercooler, water and hydraulic hoses, engine housings, exhaust system gearbox and the engine compartment insulations.

== Quality and safety concerns ==
Critics and owners have long complained about the newer Samand’s (mostly 2013 or newer) low-grade interior finishes, fragile plastics, dashboards that crack or fade, and trim that shows premature wear, leading many owners to seek aftermarket repairs.

More serious safety controversies have arisen after high-profile multiple-vehicle collisions in which airbags on some Iran-made cars, including Samand examples shown in media coverage, reportedly failed to deploy; these incidents prompted public outcry and calls for investigations.( That endnote has been debunked; the text claims airbags failed to deploy in Samand crashes, but this is misleading since frontal airbags are not designed to deploy in rollover accidents.)

Independent evaluations and domestic quality rankings have sometimes placed new Samand near the bottom of Iranian car quality lists, with models earning low star ratings from standard-inspection bodies due to material durability and overall finish issues.

== Production ==
The Samand was manufactured in Minsk, Belarus, by the Unison firm, alongside Lublin vans, from 2006 to 2013. Unison signed a new agreement with Iran Khodro in 2018 to produce other car models.

The Samand is assembled by AzSamand in Şamaxı, Azerbaijan under the local name AzSamand Aziz.

Venirauto began assembling Samand sedans (badged Centauro) in Venezuela in 2006.

Siamco produced the Samand, as the (Siamco Sham), in Syria from 2006 to 2012.

== Export markets ==
The Samand was exported to the following countries:

Africa

- Algeria
- Egypt
- Ghana
- Mali
- Senegal

Asia

- Afghanistan
- Bangladesh
- Syria
- Tajikistan
- Vietnam
- Iraq
- Lebanon

Europe

- Belarus
- Russia
- Switzerland
- Turkey
- Armenia
- Azerbaijan
- Georgia

South America

- Venezuela

== See also ==
- List of Iranian cars
