= IKCO Runna =

IKCO Runna (X12)
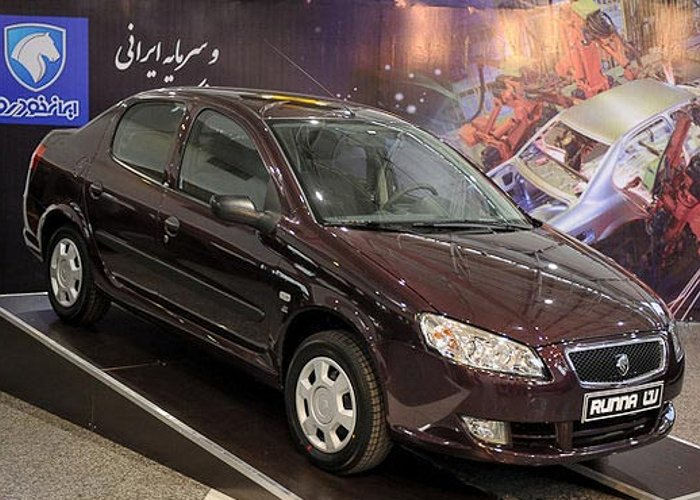

Overview
- Manufacturer: Iran Khodro
- Also called: Wallys 719 (Tunisia)
- Production: 2010 - present (Iran); 2022 - present (Tunisia)
- Model years: 1391 – present (Iranian calendar)
- Assembly: Abchak, Belarus (Unison); Tehran, Iran; Kabaria, Tunisia (Wallyscar)

Body and chassis
- Class: Subcompact car (B)
- Body style: 4-door Sedan
- Layout: FF
- Platform: Modified Peugeot 206 platform

Powertrain
- Engine: 1.6 L TU5JP4 109 PS (80 kW) L4
- Transmission: 5-speed manual (BE4); 6-speed manual

Dimensions
- Length: 4,292 mm (169.0 in)
- Width: 1,684 mm (66.3 in)
- Height: 1,453 mm (57.2 in)

The Runna (Persian: رانا) (codenamed X12) is a passenger car made by the Iranian manufacturer IKCO (Iran Khodro). It is a sedan based on the Peugeot 206, and smaller than the IKCO Samand (X7).

== Overview ==
The Runna was offered with two different four-cylinder engines: a 108-horsepower 1.6-liter gasoline unit (TU5JP4) and a 1.7-liter (actually 1648 cc) unit (EF7), both of which are reported to meet Euro IV and V emission standards. The 1.7-liter EF7 engine family includes engines designed to run on CNG (in addition to purely gasoline units); initial reports indicated that the 1.7-liter engine offered on the Runna was going to be CNG-powered. In 2013, the 1.7-liter option was removed from the manufacturer's website; the 1.6-liter TU5-series gasoline engine (now with 105 hp of power output) is the only option available.

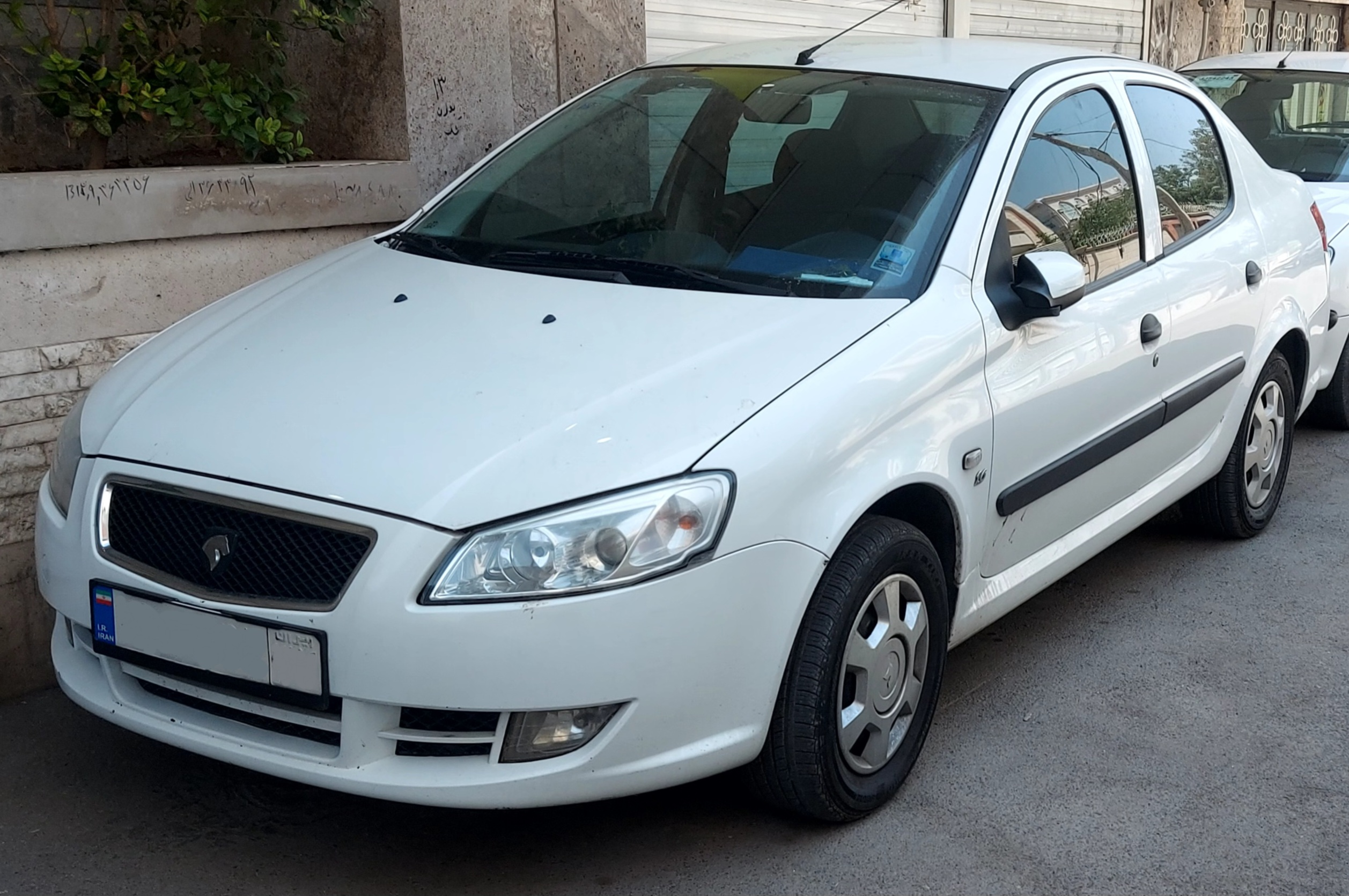
IKCO Runna (pre-facelift)

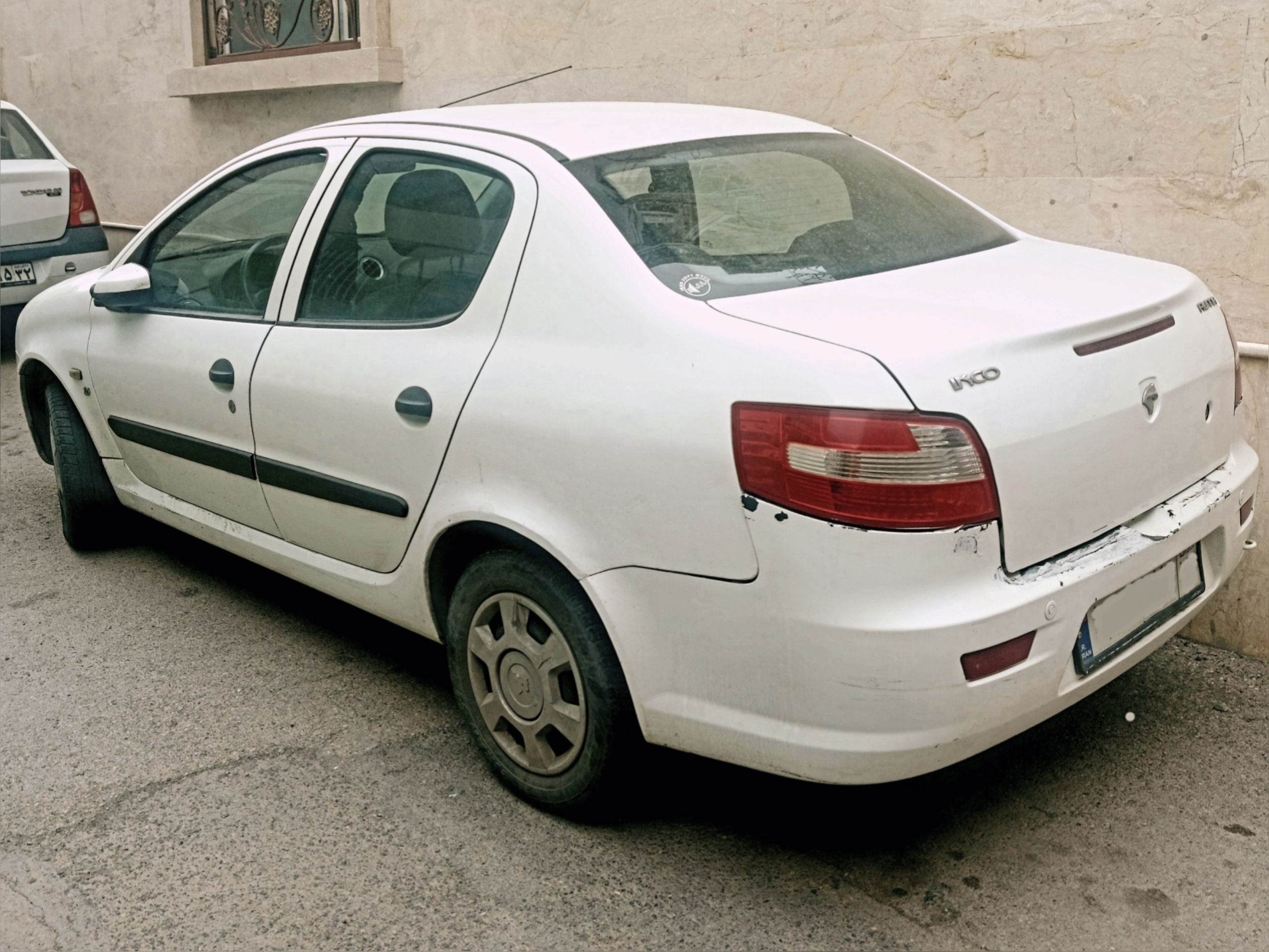
IKCO Runna (rear view)

Before the launch, there were also reports about a version using a 95-horsepower 1.4-liter unit (EF4), but the manufacturer's site did not mention that option.

The vehicle was claimed to meet the "pedestrian impact" safety requirement. Features were said to include airbags, anti lock brakes, power steering and power windows. The first cars were expected to reach Iranian customers in mid-2011, with exports to Turkey and other neighboring countries to begin shortly after that. Deliveries actually started in 2012/2013 (1391 in the Iranian calendar). In 2020/2021 (1399 in the Iranian calendar), a facelifted model called the Runna Plus entered production.

Back in 2009, IKCO planned to build 150,000 Runnas a year at full production.

The vehicle is based on the Peugeot 206, which was also offered as a sedan (although not in Western Europe). It is a sedan with a three-box design. The manufacturer says it features "a completely new appearance in the front and rear including engine hood, trunk lid, bumpers, lights, and fenders".

The manufacturer's site describes the vehicle as made from drawn steel sheet which ranges in thickness from 0.7 mm to 2.5 mm, depending on its function. High elastic strength steel sheets are used for components that are subjected to particularly high levels of stress, such as the front structural member supports or the sub frame. According to the manufacturer, this results in both greater strength and a weight reduction of around 50% compared to conventional steel sheets.

In December 2022, the Tunisian car manufacturer Wallyscar launched the Wallys 719, a rebadged and slightly modified IKCO Runna.

IKCO Runna Plus

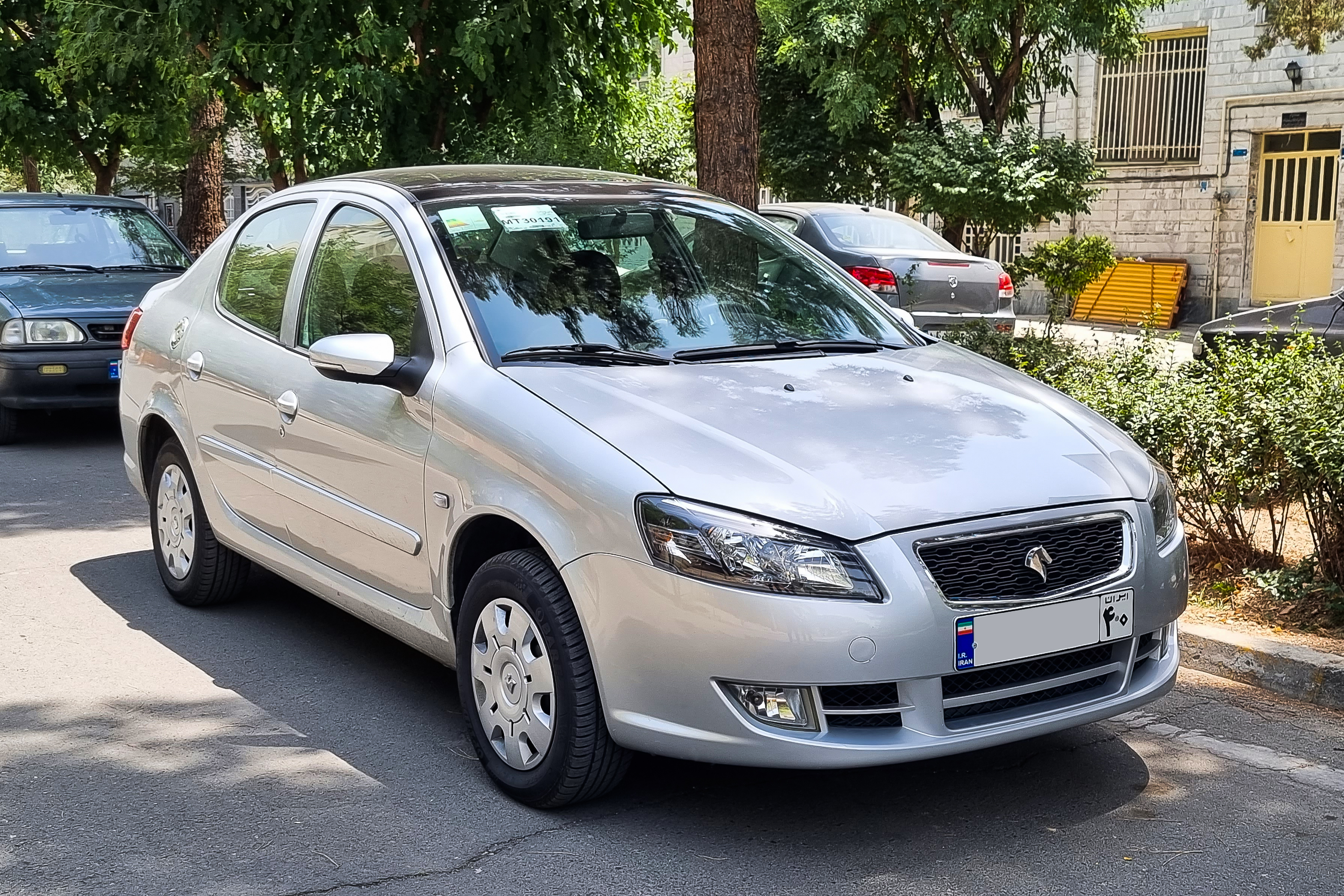
Front view

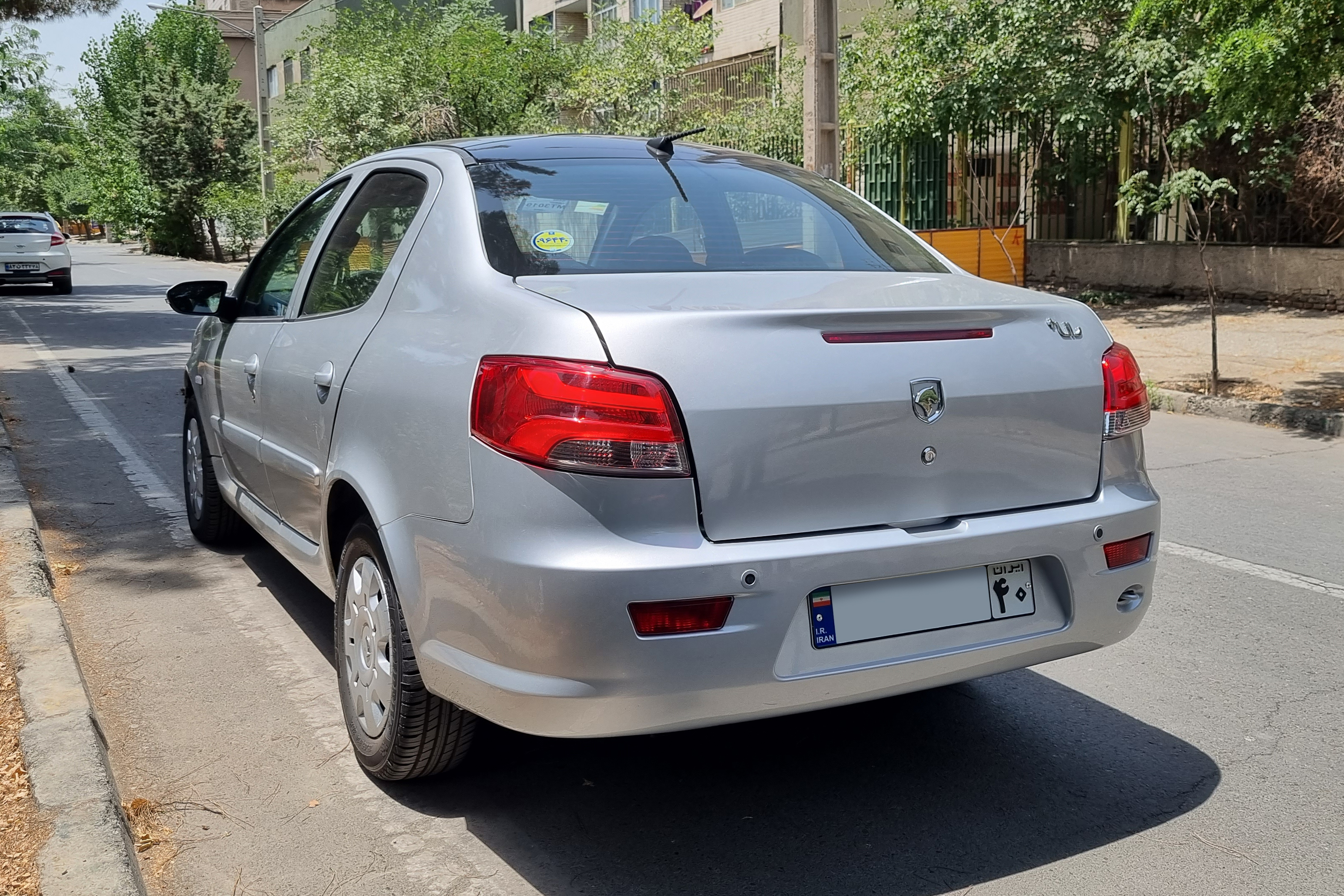
Rear view

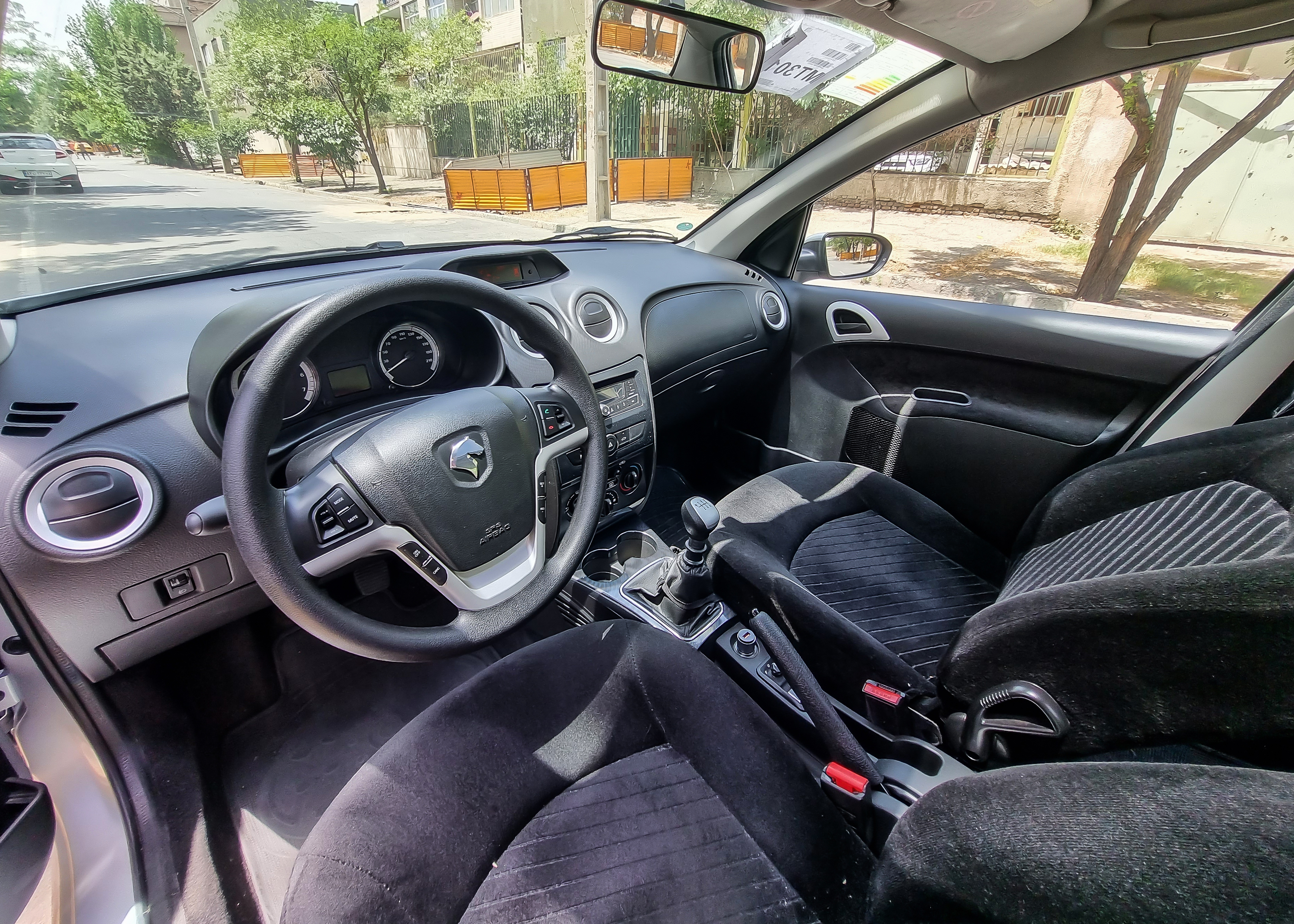
Interior view

== See also ==
- Iran Khodro
- Iranian automobile industry
- Peugeot 206 SD
- Wallyscar
