= Apchak =

Village in Minsk Region, Belarus

Apchak Апчак (Belarusian)
- Village
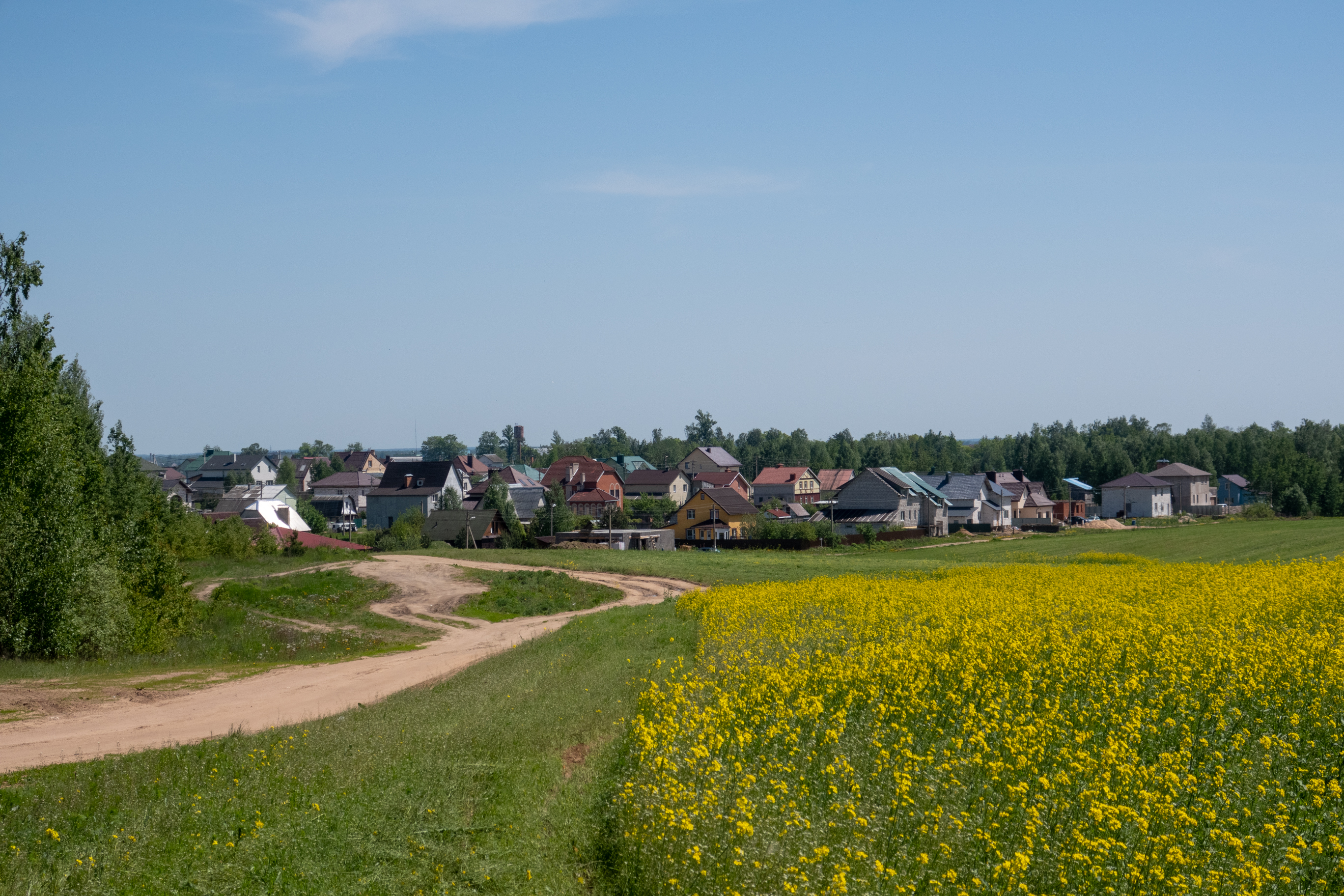

- Location in Belarus
- Coordinates: 53°48′46″N 27°48′56″E
- Country: Belarus
- Region: Minsk Region
- District: Minsk District

Population (2001)
  - Total: 4,806
- Time zone: UTC+3 (MSK)

Apchak (Belarusian: Апчак, romanized: Apčak; Russian: Обчак, romanized: Obchak) is a village in Minsk District, Minsk Region, Belarus. It is administratively part of Luhavaya Slabada selsoviet.

== History ==
In the Polish–Lithuanian Commonwealth, Apchak was located in Minsk Voivodeship. It was ceded to Russia as a result of Second Partition of Poland. Within the borders of Russia, the village belonged to Minsky Uyezd in Minsk Governorate. Again under the Polish administration in the years 1919–1920, Apchak was located in the Civil Administration of the Eastern Lands.
