= IKCO Tara =

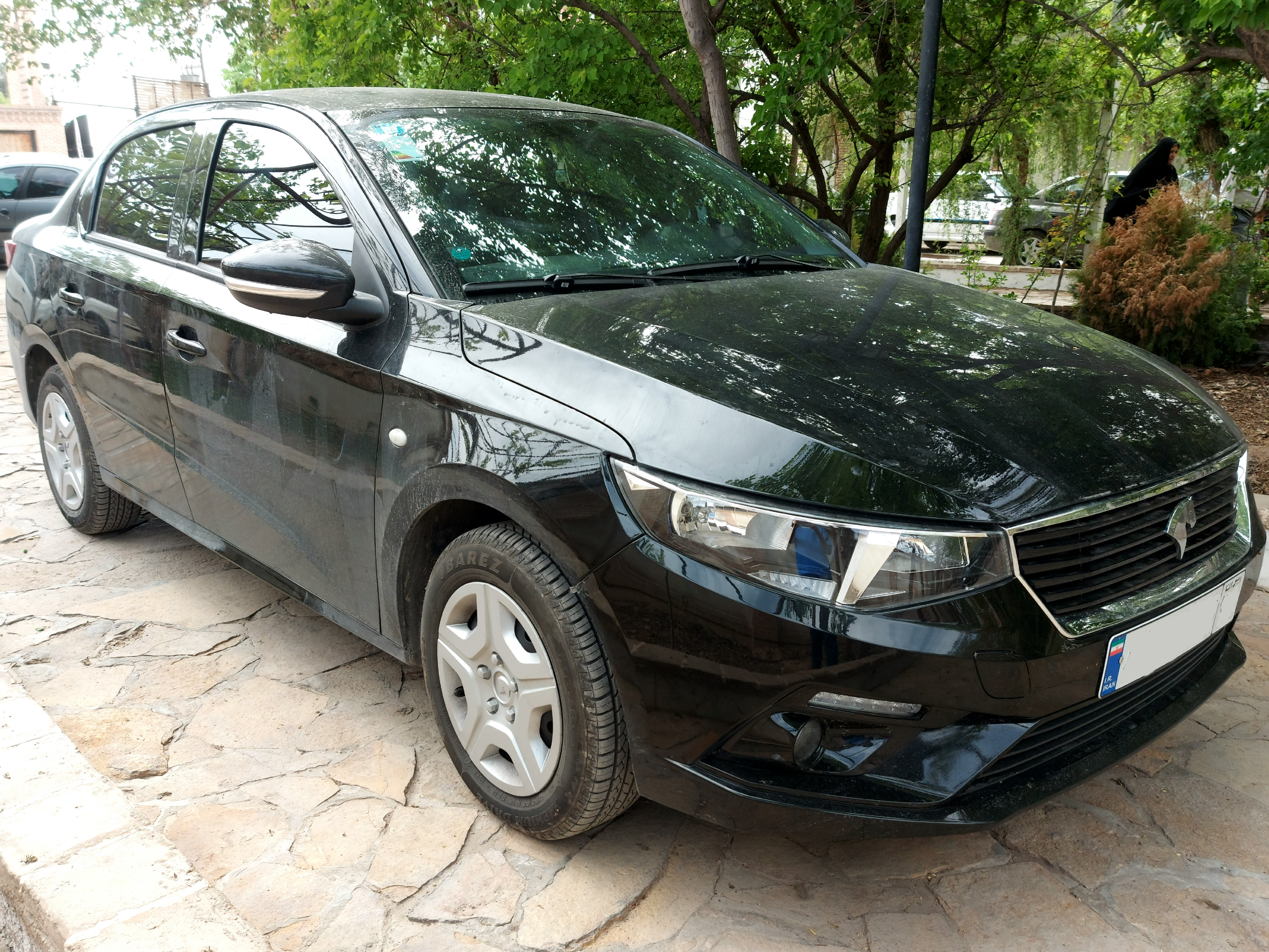

Overview
- Manufacturer: Iran Khodro
- Model code: K132
- Also called: Peugeot 301; Citroën C-Elysée
- Production: 2021–present
- Assembly: Iran: Tehran

Body and chassis
- Class: Compact car (C)
- Body style: 4-door saloon
- Layout: Front-engine, front-wheel-drive
- Platform: IKCO IKP1 (modified PSA PF1 platform)
- Related: Citroën C3-XR; Peugeot 301; DS 3 Peugeot 208; Citroën C3; Opel Crossland; Peugeot 2008

Powertrain
- Engine: Petrol: 1.6 L TU5P VVT I4; 1.7 L EFP-TC turbo I4
- Transmission: 5-speed manual 6-speed manual 6-speed automatic

Dimensions
- Wheelbase: 2,652 mm (104.4 in)
- Length: 4,519 mm (177.9 in)
- Width: 1,953 mm (76.9 in)
- Height: 1,466 mm (57.7 in)
- Kerb weight: 1,170 kg (2,579 lb)

The IKCO Tara (Persian: تارا, code name: K132) is a compact (C-segment) sedan produced by Iranian carmaker Iran Khodro since 2021. The Tara is a derivative of the Peugeot 301 and is based on Iran Khodro's IKP1 platform, which is a modified version of the PSA PF1 platform. The platform is shared with the Peugeot 208, Peugeot 2008 and Citroën C-Elysée.

== History ==
In 2016, after the JCPOA was announced, Iran Khodro and Peugeot intended to jointly produce the Peugeot 301, Peugeot 208 and Peugeot 2008 as part of the IKAP (Iran Khodro Automobile Peugeot) joint venture. After the return of sanctions by the United States in 2018, Peugeot left Iran with the suspension of IKAP. As a result, Iran Khodro modified the Peugeot 301 for local production, which resulted in the Tara. It was unveiled for the first time on February 19, 2020, on the sidelines of the cabinet meeting by Hassan Rouhani. The Tara, under the codename K132, was officially unveiled at a SAPCO facility. The car was pre-sold for the first time on July 8, 2020.

== Design ==
The side frame, cabin and roof frame shares design with the Peugeot 301 and Citroën C3-XR. Most changes have been made in the design of the front and rear end. According to Iran Khodro, the car is 92% internalized.

== Technical features ==
The Tara is available with two gearbox options, a 5 speed manual transmission (replaced by a 6 speed manual transmission in 2024) and a 6 speed automatic transmission. The car uses the TU5P engine, which is a modified version of the PSA TU5 engine, a 4-cylinder with a displacement of 1587 cc, featuring 16-valve indirect injection a CVVT (a.k.a. variable valve timing) system and a double overhead camshaft (DOHC) design. The powertrain produces 115 PS (85 kW; 113 hp) and 144 N⋅m (106 lb⋅ft). It has a 55L fuel tank that meets the Euro 5 emission standards and is equipped with an electrical power steering system. Top speed for both manual and automatic transmission models is 190 km/h (118 mph) and acceleration from 0 to 100 km/h (62 mph) in the manual and automatic models takes 12.5 and 13 seconds respectively.

In 2025, IKCO announced its plans for Tara with the new EFP-TC. This turbocharged 1.7-liter engine features significant improvements in performance and efficiency compared to the naturally aspirated TU5P. Producing 150 horsepower and 215 Nm of torque, the EFP-TC offers enhanced acceleration and better fuel economy. This key upgrades also includes an optimized A/C compressor and improved air conditioning system. The EFP-TC mated to a 6 speed automatic transmission improves the overall performance of the compact sedans.

== V1+ and V4 ==
In 2023, after receiving complaints about the car's core design issues, Iran Khodro refreshed and replaced the V1 and V2 trims of the Tara with the V1+ and V4. The V1+ featured a new 6-speed manual transmission, the same one found in IKCO Dena Manual 6SPD. It also featured an electronically powered sunroof, new taillight design, a new antenna design which resembles a shark fin, a keyless starter system, an armrest panel for the second row seats, and automatically folding mirrors.

The V4 featured a new sunroof design, a sunglasses holder, heated seats, an SOS/emergency services button, the same new shark fin antenna as the V1+, the same armrest panel for the second row seats, and a trunk kick sensor.

== Gallery ==
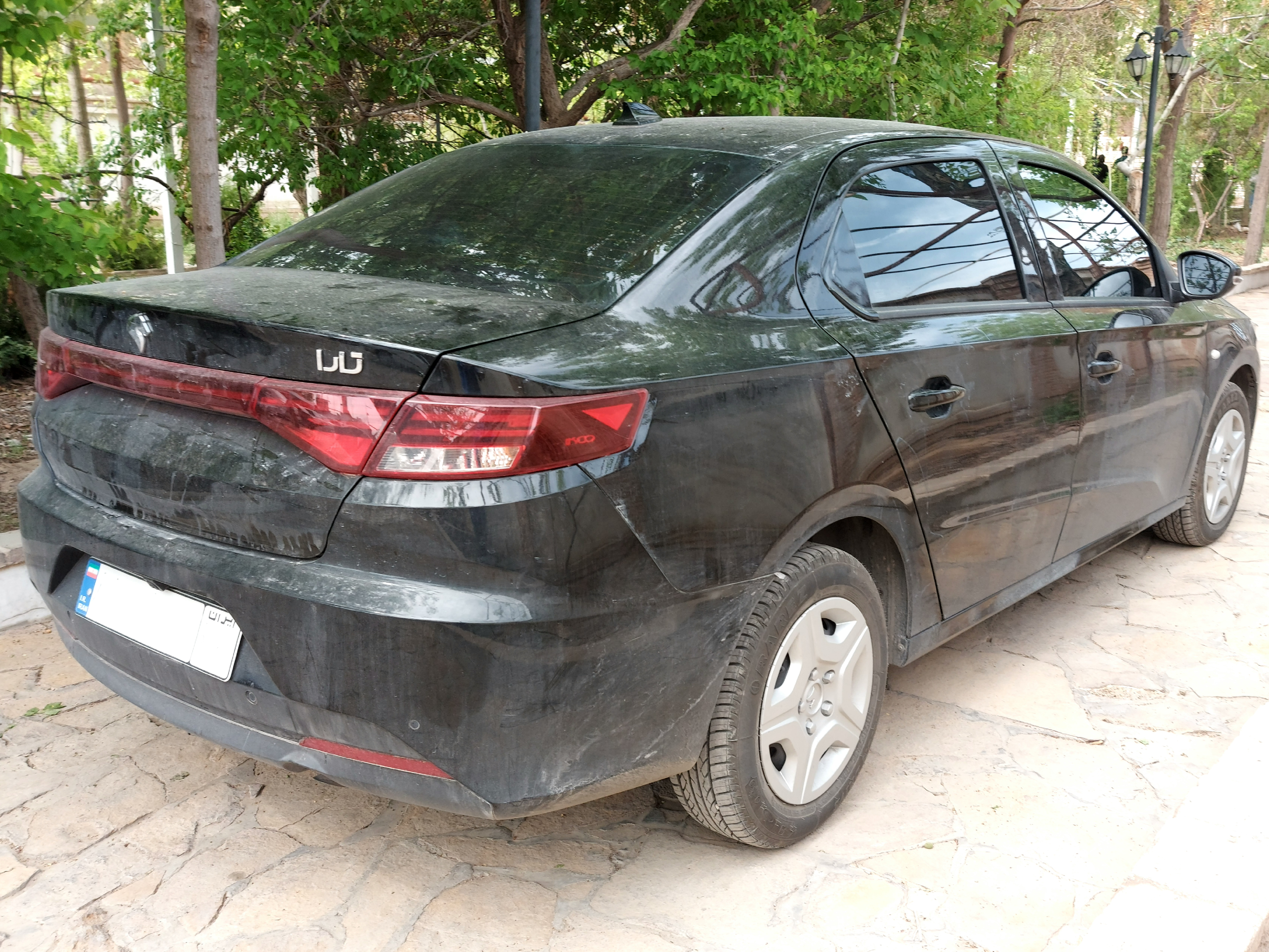
Rear view (V1+)

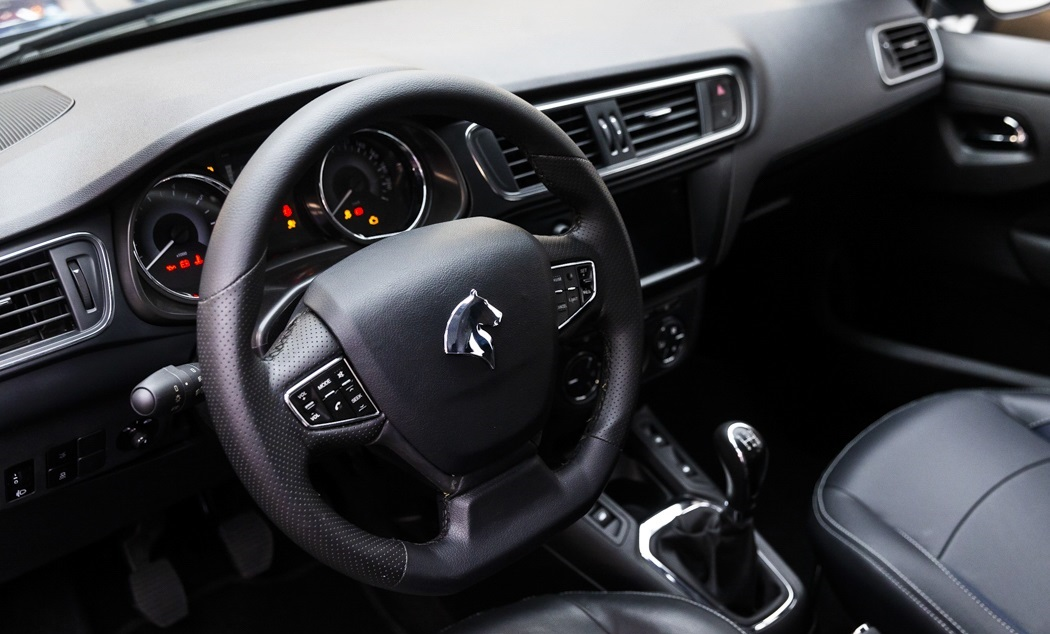
Interior (V1)

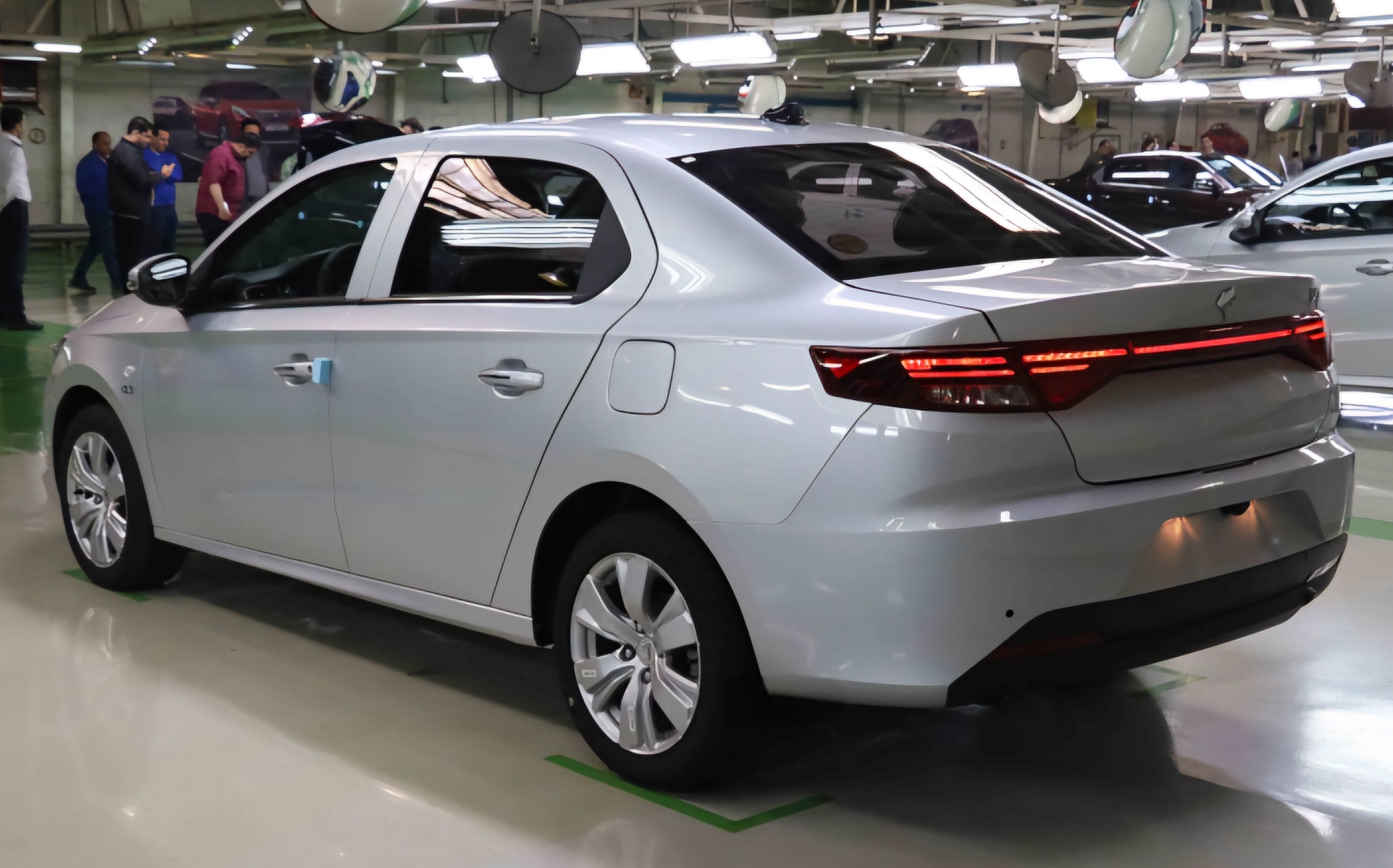
Rear view (V4)

== See also ==
- Saipa Shahin
- IKCO Dena
- Peugeot 301 (2012)
- IKCO Reera
