= Venirauto Turpial =

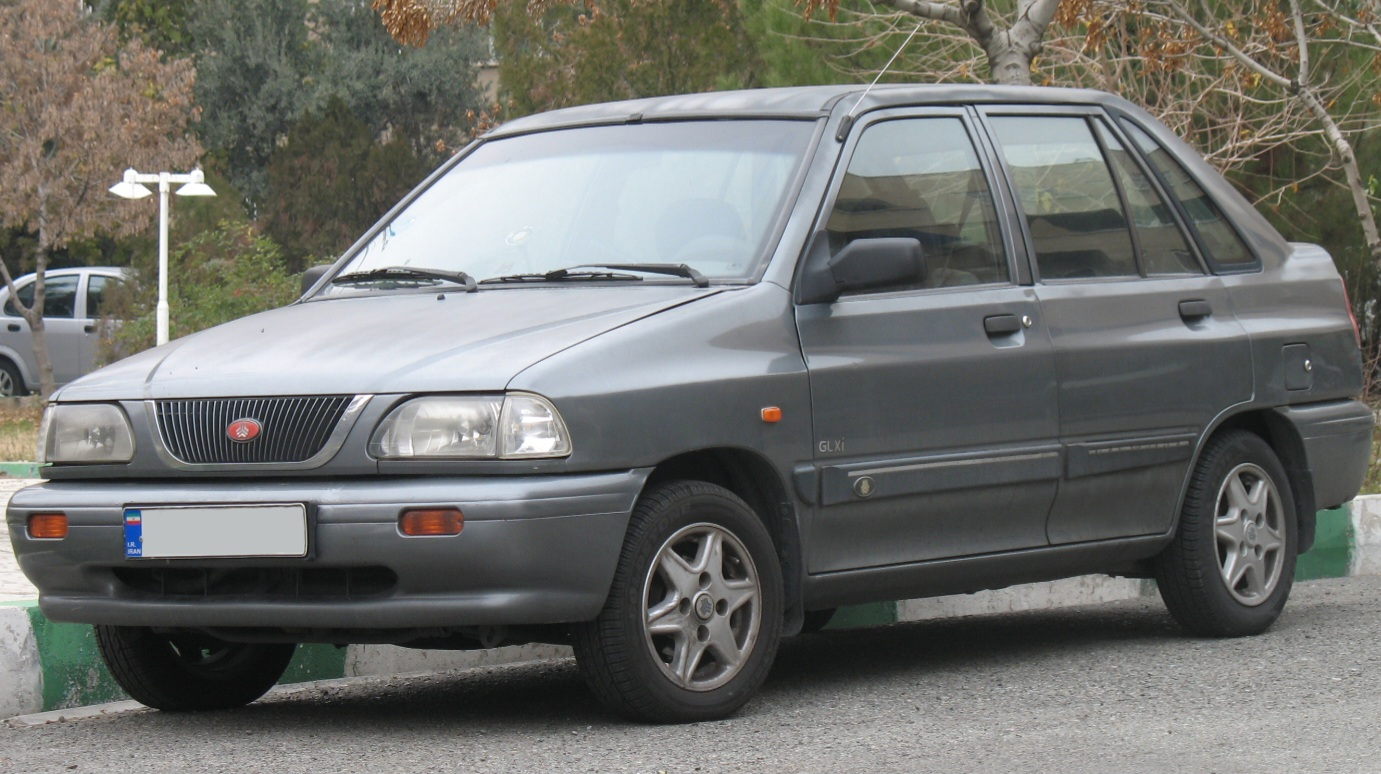

The Venirauto Turpial is a subcompact four-door sedan produced in Venezuela by Venirauto, a joint Venezuelan-Iranian venture. The Turpial is a locally produced version of the SAIPA 141 It is named for the national bird of Venezuela. The production plant is located in Maracay west of Caracas and has been producing vehicles since at least July, 2007. According to the German newspapers die Tageszeitung the plant nearly produces no cars.
