= Iran Khodro =

Iranian automaker headquartered in Tehran

- Native name: ایران خودرو
- Formerly: Iran National Corp. (1962–1979)
- Type: Private
- Traded as: TSE: Iran Khodro(IKCO1); ISIN: IRO1IKCO0008
- Industry: Automotive
- Predecessor: Irannational
- Founded: 29 August 1962; 64 years ago
- Founder: Ahmad Khayami; Mahmoud Khayami
- Headquarters: Tehran, Iran
- Area served: List: Iran, Russia, Belarus, Senegal, Turkmenistan, Azerbaijan, Algeria, Venezuela
- Key people: Mehdi Khatibi (President and CEO) Mohammadreza Feyzbakhsh (Chairman of the board)
- Products: Automobiles; Commercial vehicles; Engines; Automotive parts
- Services: Automotive finance; Vehicle leasing; Vehicle service
- Revenue: ▲US$ 12.8 billion (2011)
- Operating income: ▼US$ 1.03 billion (2011)
- Total assets: ▲US$ 32 billion (2011)
- Owners: Cruise Company
- Number of employees: 72,000 (2022)
- Subsidiaries: List: Transportation; IKAP; Iran Khodro Diesel Automotive Parts; SAPCO Investment; SAMAND Investment Other; IASCO; IPCO; TAM Co.
- Website: www.ikco.ir

Iran Khodro (Persian: ایران خودرو, Irān Khodro), branded as IKCO, is an Iranian automaker headquartered in Tehran. IKCO was founded in 1962 as Iran National (ایران ناسیونال, Irān Nāsionāl). The public company manufactures vehicles, including Samand, Peugeot and Renault cars, and trucks, minibuses and buses. As of 2009, it produced 688,000 passenger cars per year.

== History and development ==
=== Name ===
The word khodro (خودرو) means "automobile" in Persian, hence Iran Khodro means "Iran Automobile".

=== Founding ===
Iran Khodro was founded on August 29, 1962.

=== Structure ===
Iran Khodro Industrial Group (IKCO) is a public joint stock company with the objective of creation and management of factories to manufacture various types of vehicles and parts as well as selling and exporting them.

=== Size and production ===
The company has become the largest vehicle manufacturer in the Middle East, Central Asia and North Africa. In Iran, it is the largest vehicle manufacturing company, having an average share of 65 percent of domestic vehicle production.

Iran Khodro produced 556,442 passenger cars and commercial vehicles in 2023 and has planned to produce 600,000 units in 2024.

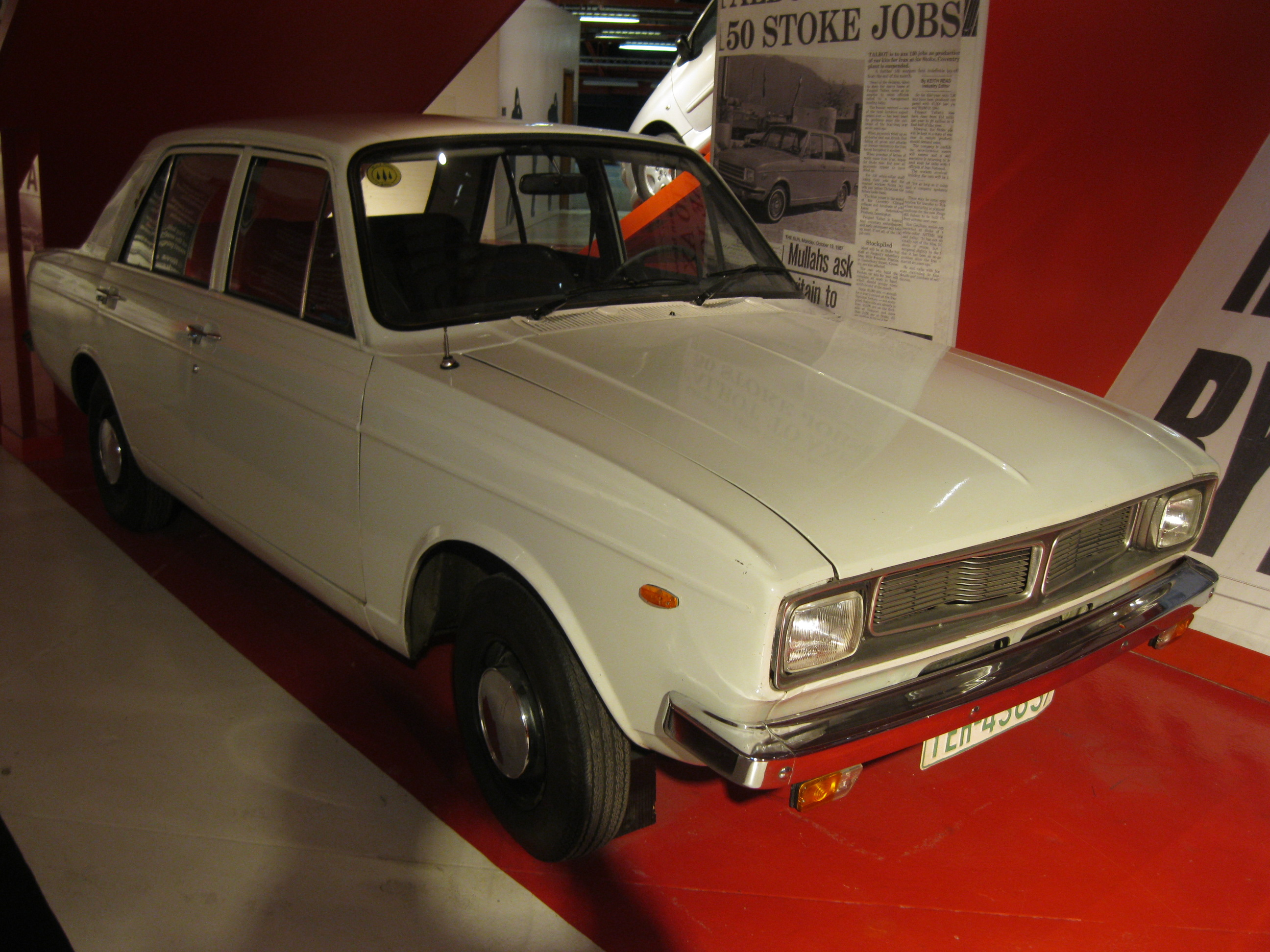
Paykan Hillman Hunter at the Coventry Transport Museum

=== Certifications ===
Iran Khodro has qualified for ISO 9001 from RW-TÜV, Germany, as well as many other health, safety, and environment certificates including ISO 14001 and OHSAS 18001.

=== Products and relationships ===
Iran's automobile production crossed the 1 million mark in 2005. Iran Khodro is one of the largest car manufacturers in Asia. It has established joint-ventures with foreign partners on 4 continents. For more than three decades, Iran Khodro produced the Paykan, a car developed from the Rootes Group's Rootes Arrow range, best known as the Hillman Hunter. Paykan saloon car production was discontinued in 2005, almost thirty years after the end of Arrow production (latterly as the Chrysler Hunter) in Britain. A pick-up version was still in production until 2015. Bardo Pick-up, pick-up version of Paykan, will be replaced by a new pick-up called the Arisun which is related to the Samand.

The Iranian-designed IKCO Samand replaced the dated Paykan as Iran's "national car", and featured a partly Iranian-designed CNG/petrol dual-fuel engine in its Soren variant.

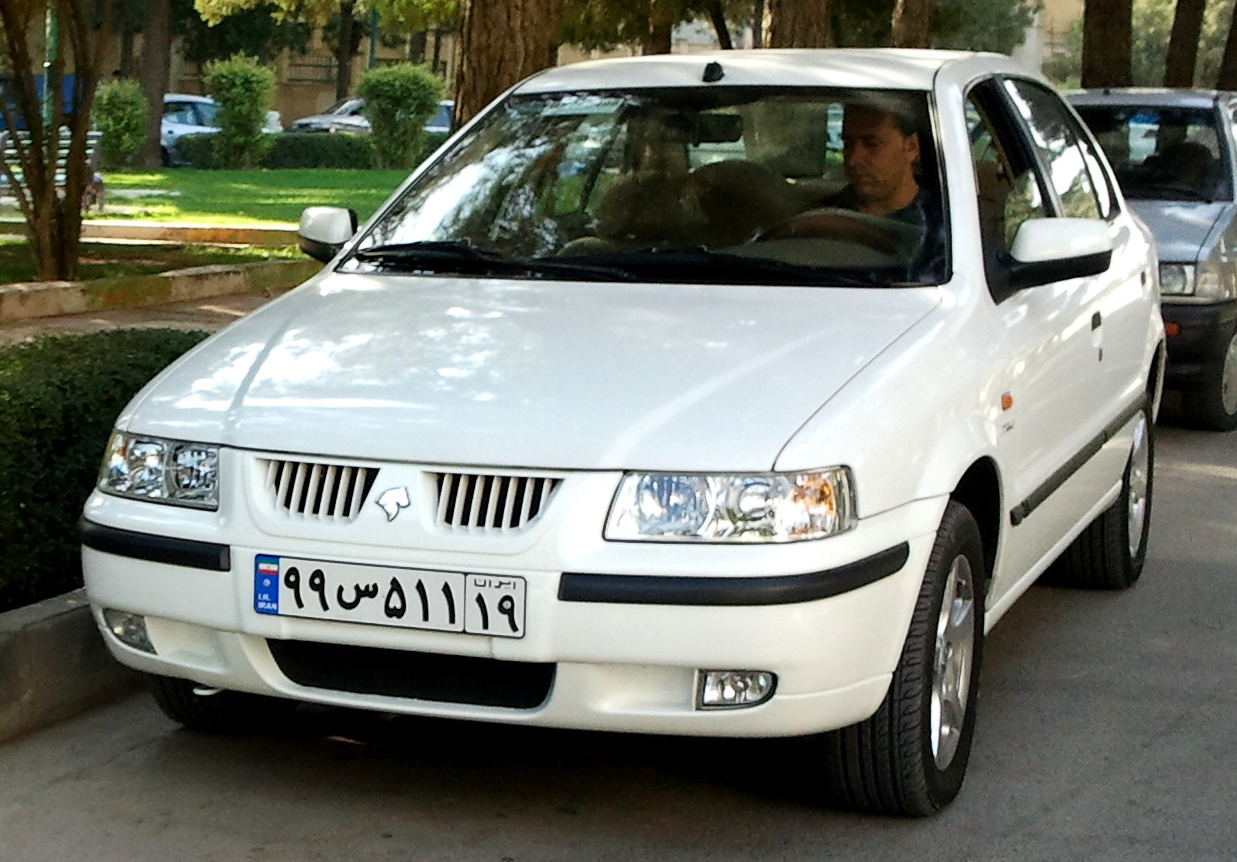
Front view of Samand LX

The firm has a long-term relationship with European and Asian manufacturers including PSA Peugeot Citroën, manufacturing and assembling a number of models under license from these firms. In 2009, Peugeot 206, Peugeot Pars, Peugeot 405, Peugeot Roa, and Samand sedans were IKCO's export-bound cars sent to Azerbaijan, Iraq, Armenia, Uzbekistan, Turkmenistan, Syria and Afghanistan. As at 2012, IKCO products incorporate 5-10 percent of components imported from France. IKCO's parts imports from Peugeot accounted for 700-800 million euros ($572–654 million) per year. Iran has reached 98% of self-sufficiency in producing Peugeot 405 parts and 75% in Peugeot 206 parts.

By the end of 2012, Peugeot cut its relations with Iran Khodro due to the international sanctions against Iran. Four years later, in 2016, after reaching Joint Comprehensive Plan of Action between Iran and E3+3, Iran Khodro and Peugeot decided to make a 50%-50% joint venture named IKAP to start the relations again.

Renault Pars is in charge of the engineering, quality control, parts supply, logistics, managing sales policies as well as marketing and customer services for Renault products in Iran and IKCO is one of its main shareholders that produces Tondar for the domestic market. Renault Pars is a joint venture, 51 percent of which belongs to Renault of France. Forty-nine percent of Renault Pars' shares is jointly held by Iran's Industrial Development and Renovation Organization, IKCO and Saipa. The agreement to form this joint venture was signed in March 2004.

IKCO also manufactures trucks, buses and E-Class passenger cars under license from Mercedes-Benz. In a joint-venture with Daimler AG, Iran Khodro is to start production of sophisticated 900-class Mercedes-Benz engines; Daimler states that Iranian-made engines will be exported to Germany. Among Asian automotive manufacturers, IKCO is cooperating with Suzuki. Producing Suzuki Grand Vitara in IKCO's Site in Khorasan, IKCO will produce Suzuki Kizashi.

In 2012, IKCO announced that at least 3% of the company's sales will be allocated to research and development. As of 2015, the company's 7-year strategic plans for product development are in body design, die making, suspension, powertrain, trim and car electronics.

In 2017, Italian car design firm 'Pininfarina' signed a €70 million, 36-month contract with Iran's biggest car producer, Iran Khodro Group on for the development of four new models and to give the carmaker a second wind in research and development of new models. The agreement will help develop a modular automotive platform for four different vehicles, and the first passenger car of the medium segment of the market, a press release from the Italian firm said.

=== Production sites ===
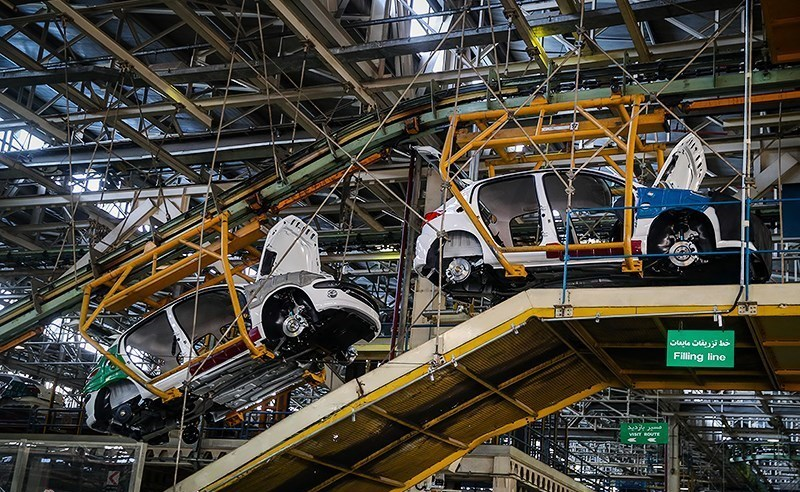
Iran Khodro factory in Tehran

Iran Khodro has a factory in Senegal, where the Samand (known in Senegal as the SenIran) is manufactured. In Azerbaijan, the Azsamand and the Dena are manufactured.

IKCO has 12 production site around the globe, 6 sites in within Iran's borders and 6 further sites in IKCO's main export markets.

==== Domestic plants ====
Plant	Production Capacity	Product	Location
Fars	30000	Pars (Peugeot 405 and Samand to be produced later)	Shiraz
Mazandaran	15000	Pars, Samand Sarir, IKCO Reera	Babol
Semnan*	100000	Samand	Semnan
Khorasan	150000	Suzuki Grand Vitara, Pars, Haima, Peugeot 405	Mashhad
East Azerbaijan	120000	Samand EF7, Samand Arisan (replacing Paykan Pick-up)	Tabriz
IKCO (main plant)	700000	Roa, Peugeot 405, Peugeot 206, Peugeot 207i, Samand, Tondar 90, Soren	Tehran

== Sanction ==
On October 1st, 2026, the U.S. Department of the Treasury added Iran Khodro among several other Iranian companies and entities to its sanctions list.

== Foreign sites ==
Plant	Production Capacity	Product	Location
AzSamand	10000	Samand	Azerbaijan
Siamko	30000	Samand	Syria
CDC	15000	Peugeot Pars	Egypt
Seniran Auto	30000	Samand	Senegal
Venirauto	16000	Samand	Venezuela

== Export markets ==
Russia, Syria, Turkey, Iraq, Azerbaijan, Ukraine, Egypt, Algeria and Bulgaria are among the most important target markets for the group.

Export opportunities are restricted to relatively low volumes with $60 million worth of cars exported in 2007. By this Iran Khodro has ranked as 24th company among 100 top companies in Islamic world in year 2008. The Company has exported about 35,000 cars in year 2009. The company exported 40,000 units in 2010, including 30% of the total production of its Samand model. IKCO intends to export 9% of its output in 2011, amounting to 75,000 vehicles, before reaching 16% in exports by 2014.

== Cars ==
=== IKCO ===
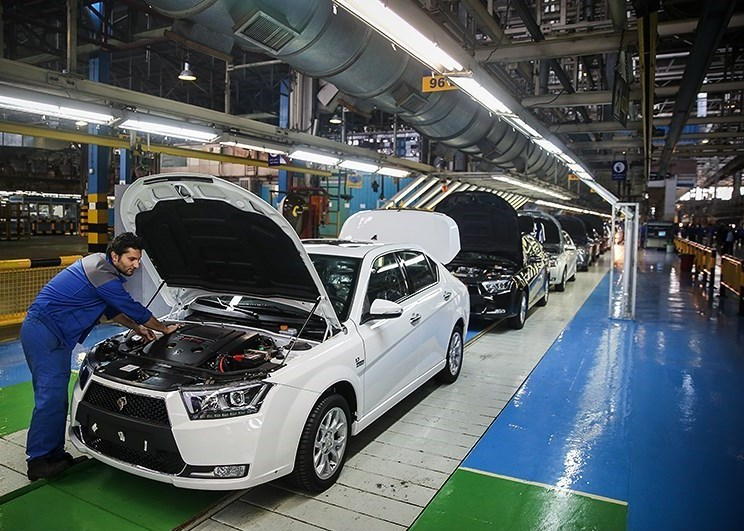
Dena+ production line in IKCO company

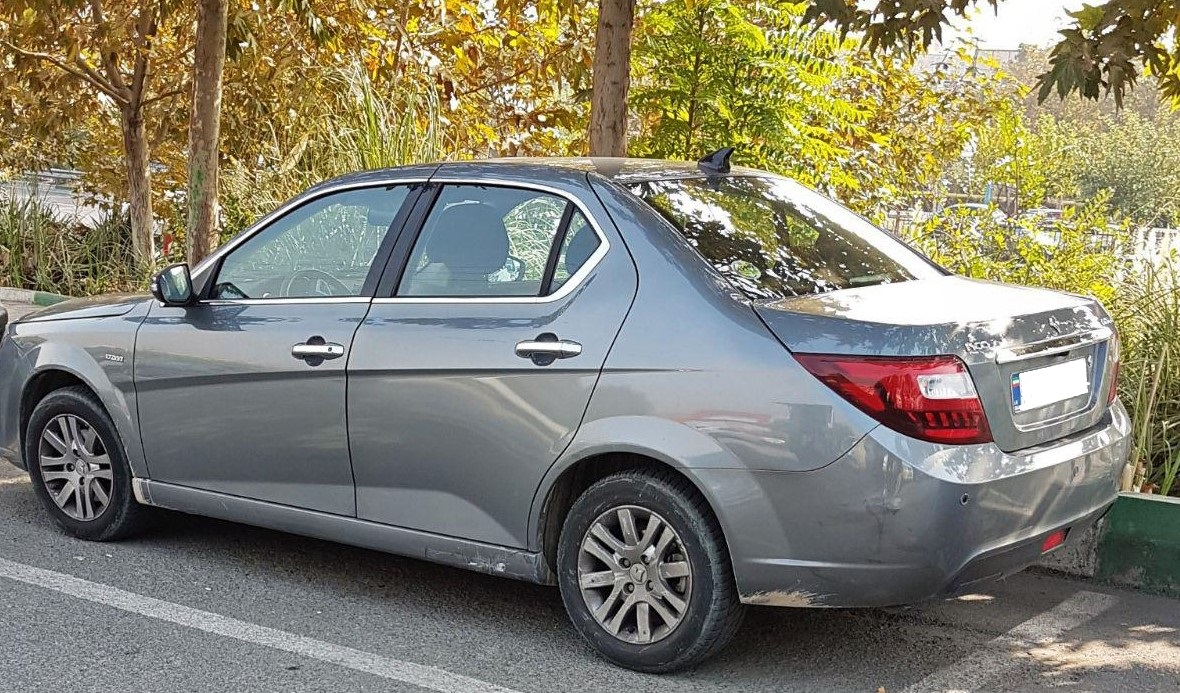
IKCO Dena+ product of 2016

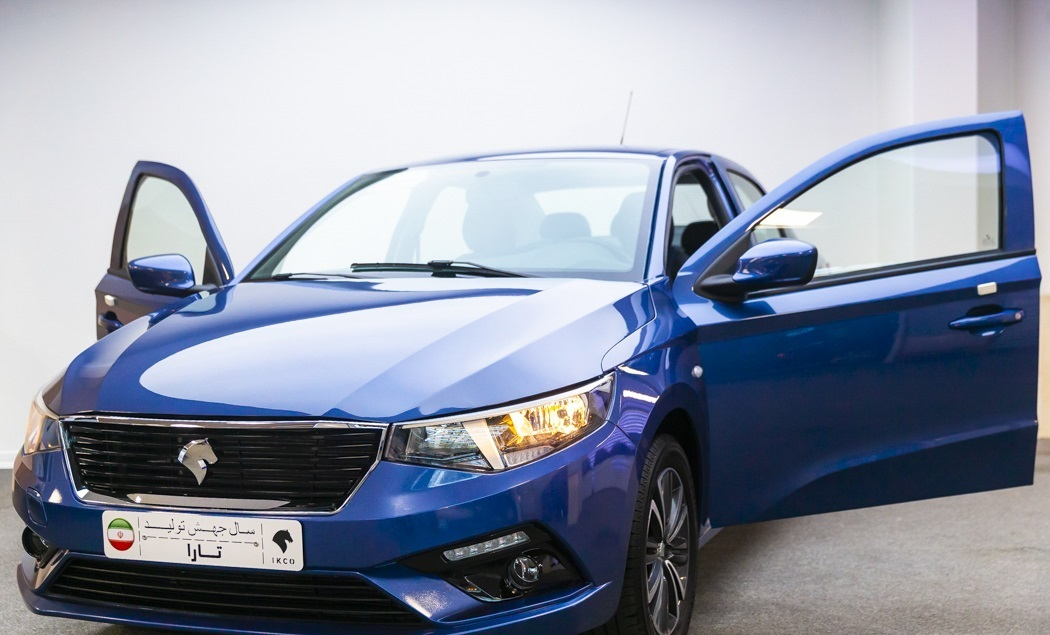
IKCO Tara

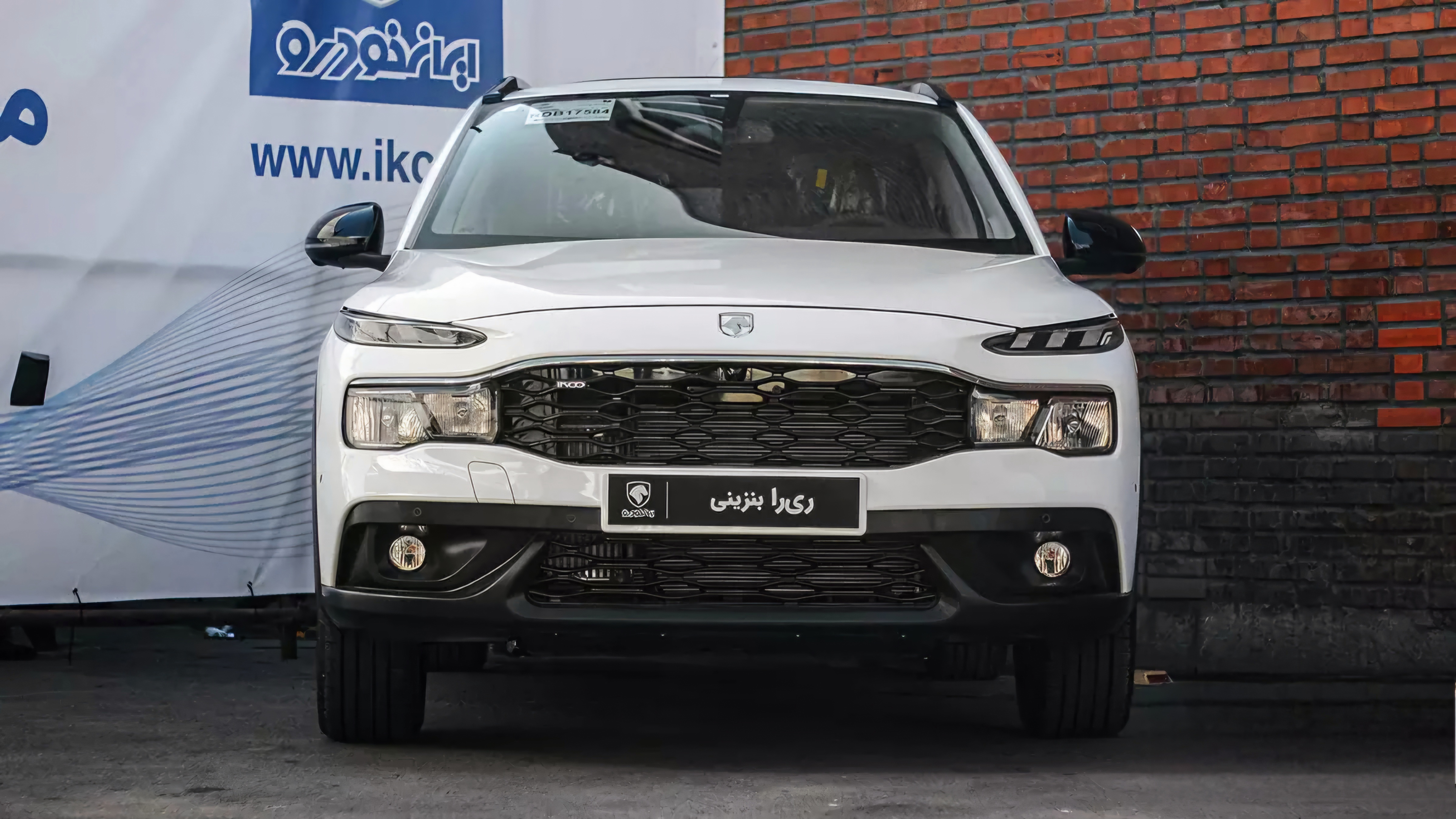
IKCO Reera

The following table shows the cars that have been specially designed

and built by IKCO:

Car	Start production	End of production	Car class
Paykan	1967	2005	Class B sedan
Bardo	1969	2014	Class B pickup
Samand	2001	2022	Class C sedan
Sarir	2006	2012	Class C sedan
Soren	2007	2019	Class C sedan
Runna	2012	2020	Class B sedan
Dena	2014	2021	Class C sedan
Arisun	2014	2020	Class C pickup
Arisun 2	2021	—	Class C pickup
Dena+	2016	—	Class C sedan
Dena+ turbo	2017	—	Class C sedan
Soren+	2019	—	Class C sedan
Runna+	2019	—	Class B sedan
Tara	2020	—	Class C sedan
Reera	2024	—	Crossover

=== Mercedes-Benz ===
Mercedes-Benz E-Class Production in Iran Khodro: A Now-Abandoned Assembly Line.

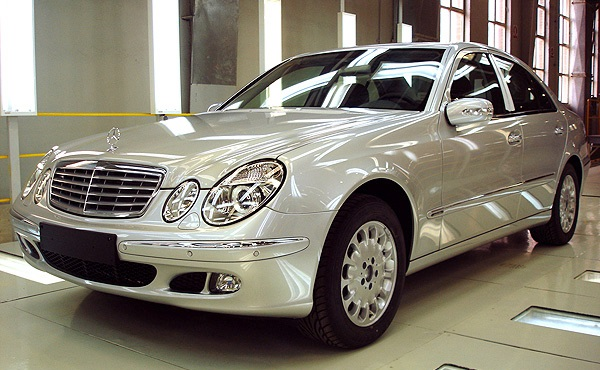
Mercedes-Benz E-Class Assembled in Iran, Tehran, Top Khodro

Thirteen years ago, the production line of the Mercedes-Benz E-Class (W211) was officially launched at Iran Khodro’s factory. Today, however, the assembly plant lies deserted.

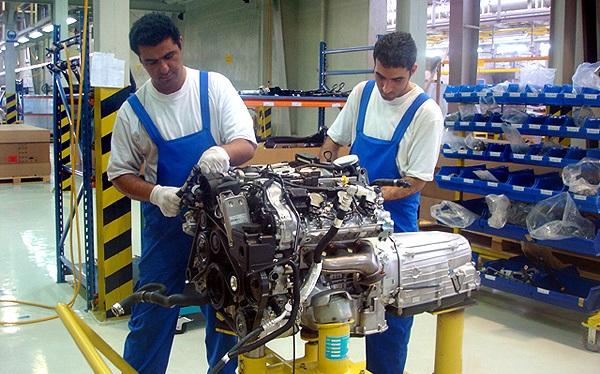
Mercedes-Benz E-Class Production Lines in Irankhodro

In 2002, negotiations between Iran Khodro and Mercedes-Benz Germany reached a successful agreement. By 2006, the W211 E-Class body was being assembled at "Top Khodro," a subsidiary of Iran Khodro. At the time, Mercedes-Benz Germany supplied around 1,740 parts for the vehicle, and Tap Khodro workers assembled the E-Class using the Semi-Knocked Down (SKD) method before releasing it to the market.

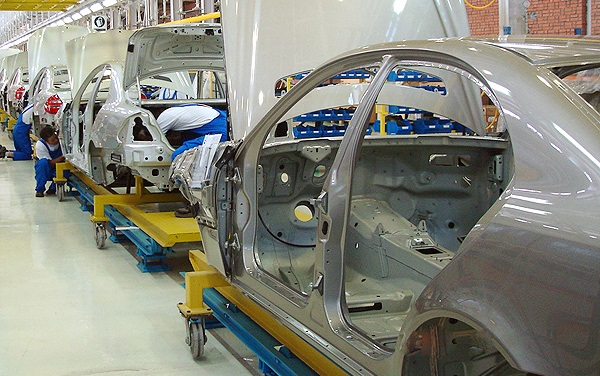
Mercedes-Benz E-Class Assembled in Iran: The Story of the E200, E280, and E350 Models

For a brief period in the mid-2000s, Iran Khodro’s subsidiary, Top Khodro, assembled several variants of the Mercedes-Benz E-Class—including the E200, E280, and E350—under license from the German automaker. These models, based on the W211 generation, were partially built through Semi-Knocked Down (SKD) assembly, with around 1,740 components imported from Mercedes-Benz.

=== Peugeot ===
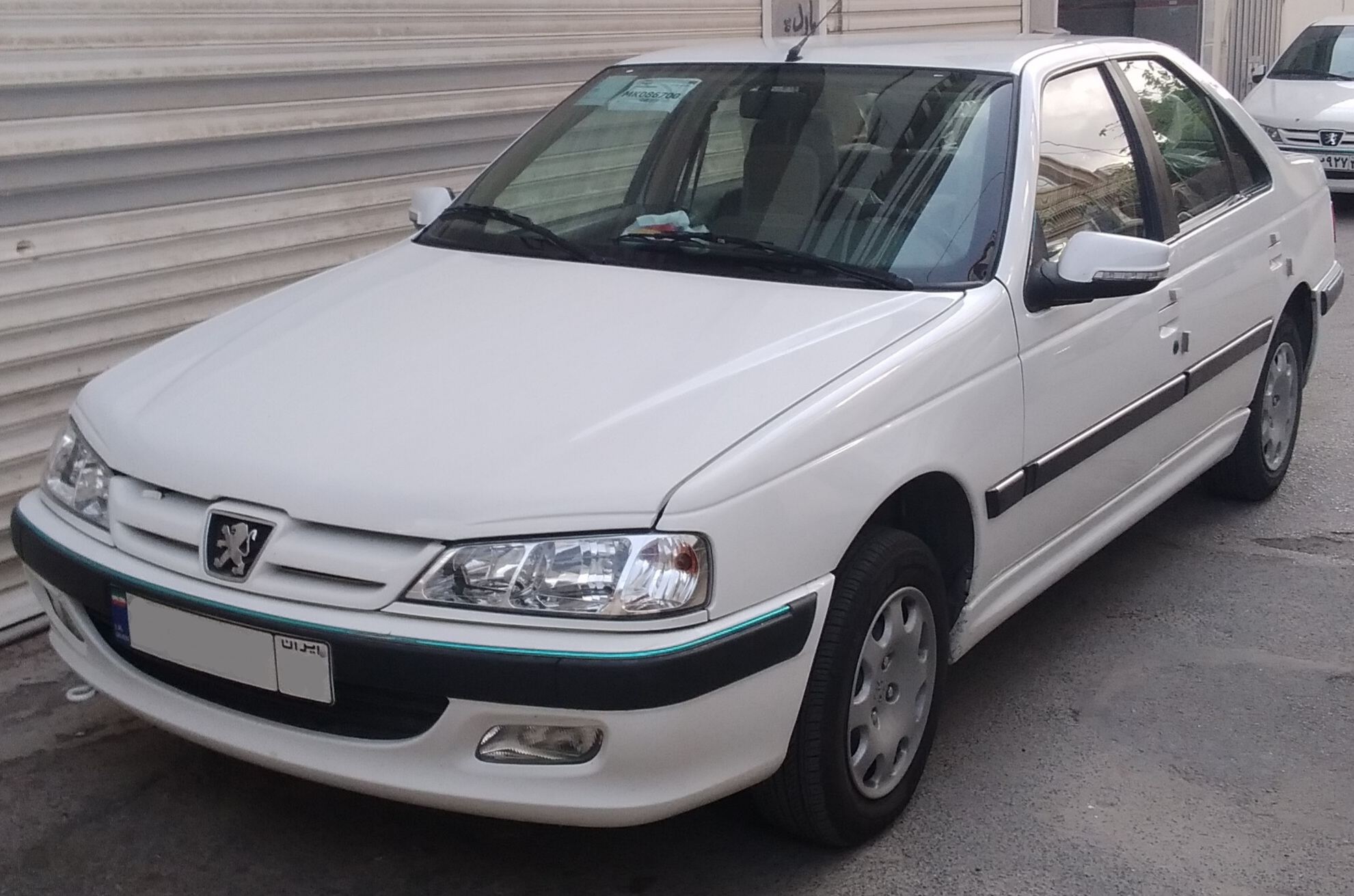
Peugeot Pars (formerly known as Peugeot Persia or simply Persia)

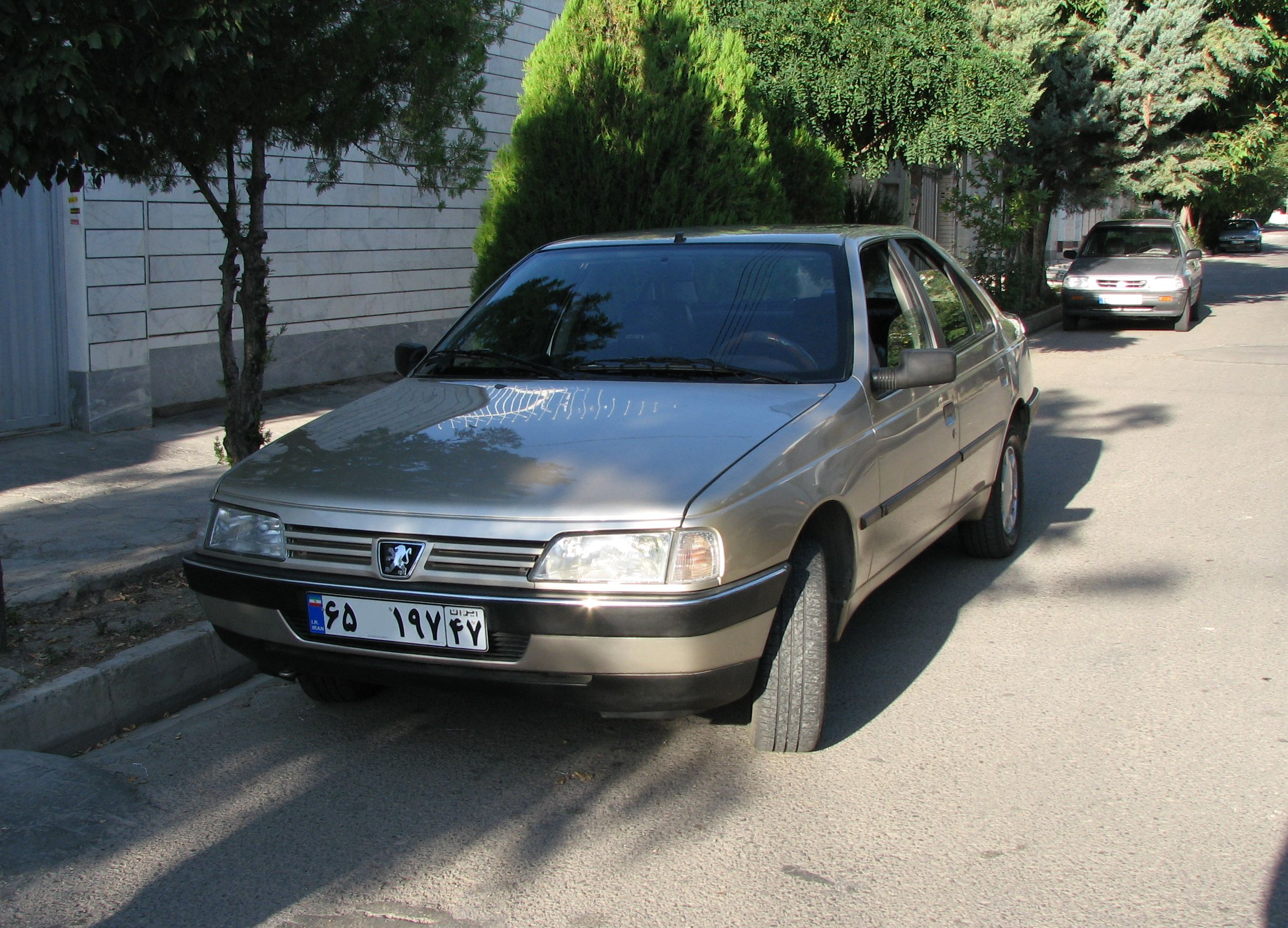
Peugeot 405

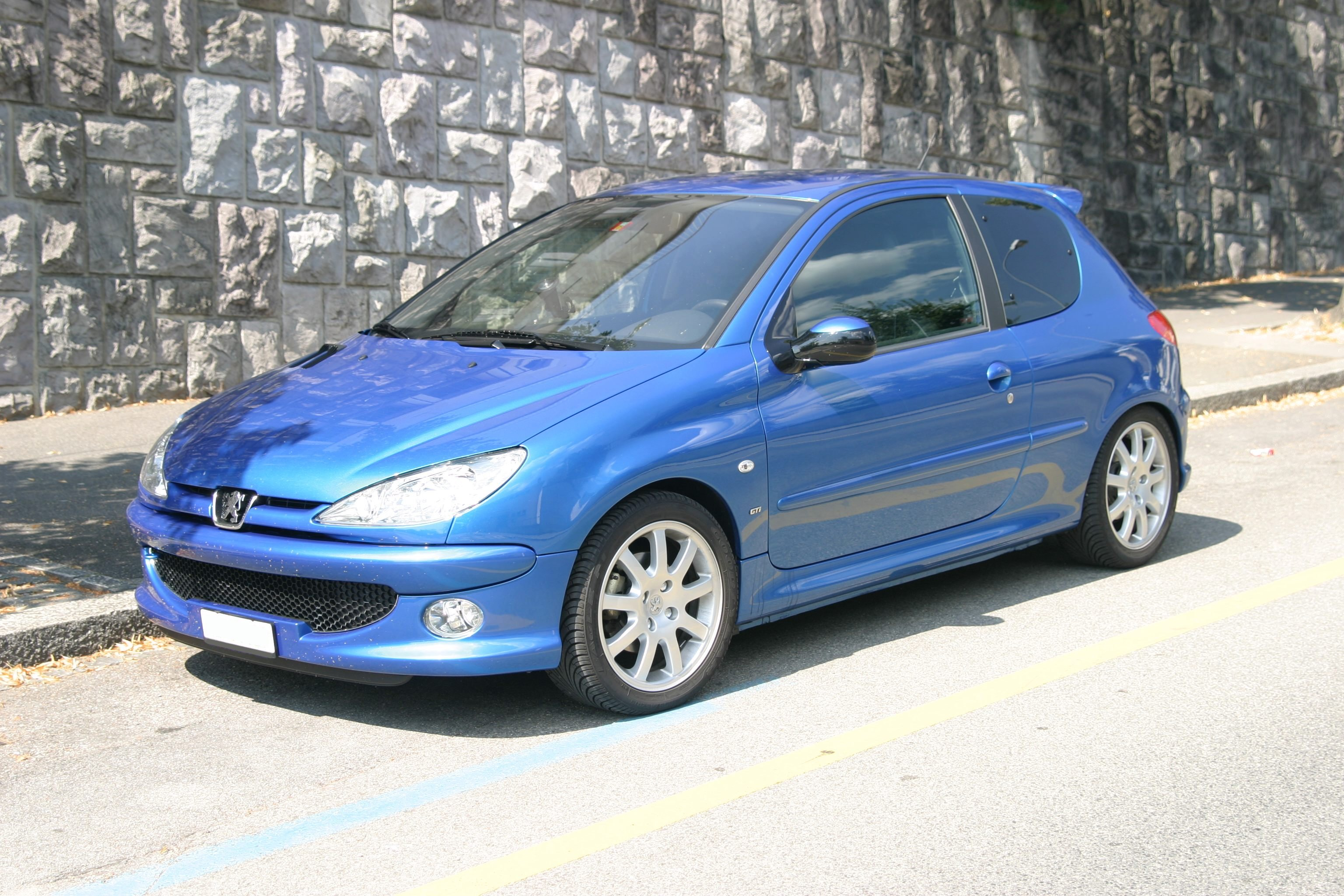
Peugeot 206

- Peugeot 206; a saloon version of the 206, the Peugeot 206 SD also co-developed with Peugeot in year 2005.(End of production)
- Peugeot 207i; by 2011, Ikco produced about 15,000-20,000 units Peugeot 207i. The production of 207i stopped in 2012 during relation cut between Ikco and Peugeot because of international sanctions against Iran.
- Peugeot 405; available in saloon trims GLi and GLX and estate trim GLX(End of production)
- Peugeot 405 trim SLX with 1.6L 16 valve PSA TU5 engine(End of production)
- Peugeot 407; as CBU (about 2000 are imported to Iran by Iran Khodro)
- Peugeot Pars; initially called the Peugeot Persia. Changes include a redesigned front and modernized rear(End of production)
- Peugeot RD; chassis and drivetrain are similar to the older Paykan but the outer body shell and appearance resemble a 405, production of this car ended in favor of the ROA.
- Peugeot ROA; modified version of Peugeot RD, production of Peugeot ROA was discontinued in 2012.

==== IKAP ====
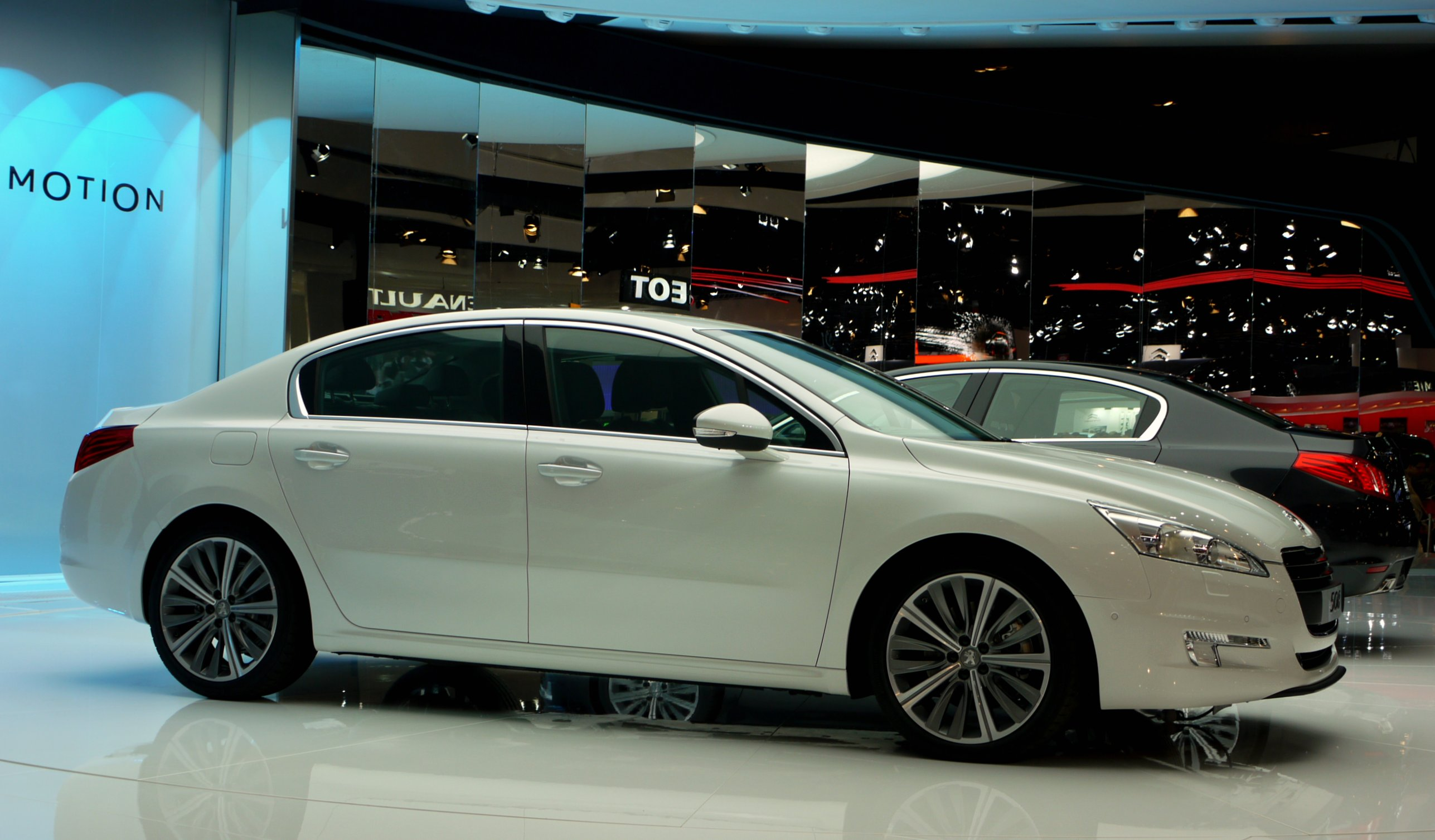
Peugeot 508

- Peugeot 508
- Peugeot 2008
- Peugeot 301

=== Renault ===
- Dacia Logan; both IKCO and Saipa produce the car as "Tondar 90".
- Renault Captur

=== Suzuki ===
- Suzuki Grand Vitara - Compact SUV which is divided to different 4 main models:
  - 2000 cc engine with 4-speed automatic gearbox
  - 2000 cc engine with 5-speed manual gearbox
  - 2400 cc engine with 4-speed automatic gearbox
  - 2400 cc engine with 5-speed manual gearbox
- Suzuki Kizashi

=== Haima ===
- Haima S7
- Haima S5
- Haima 8S
- Haima 7X

== Engines ==
- Peugeot engines:
  - PSA XU7
  - PSA TU3
  - PSA TU5
- IKCO engines:
  - IKCO EF family
  - IKCO TU5-Plus
  - IKCO XU7-Plus
  - IKCO EF7-Plus
  - IKCO 3FX family

=== EF family ===
Iran Khodro started to design a new range of engines for its products in 2007 in a joint with F.E.V of Germany. The first EF series engine officially shown to the public in 2008 is EF7 which is currently powering Samand LX car in Iran.

EF7 turbocharged engines were initially shown to the public in mid-2009 and will be installed on Soren ELX by last 2010. Other EF series engines named EF4 & EFD (Diesel) engines design are finished and they are being tested for mass production by Iran Khodro. In November 2009, Iran Khodro unveiled its new "national diesel engine" with fuel consumption of 5 liters per 100 kilometers in combined cycle. The engine has achieved emission standard of Euro 5, featuring a Diesel Particulate Filters (DPF) as well as a new Exhaust Gas Recirculation (EGR). The 1.5-liter turbodiesel uses advanced technology to deliver strong power and torque of 300Nm. Iran Khodro has designed the EF4 & EFD itself.

=== 3FX family ===
IKCO 3FX engine family is a series of straight-three cylinder engines in development by IKCO to be used on class A to class C vehicles.

== Platforms ==
- X7 platform: The first IKCO platform, the X7, was designed in 1995 with the upgrade of the Peugeot 405 platform. The first car built on this platform was Samand, with production beginning in 2001.
- IKP1 platform: IKCO's second proprietary platform. Developed by upgrading the Peugeot PF1 platform. The first car using this platform is Tara, produced since 2021.

== Subsidiary companies ==
- Supplying Automotive Parts Company (SAPCO)

SAPCO' had been established in 1993 to manage the supplying chain of automotive parts in IKCO.

- IKCO Spare Parts and After-Sale Services Co. (ISACO)

IKCO Spare Parts and After-Sale Services Co. (ISACO) was founded in 1977. ISACO is providing after-sale services and supplying spare parts for IKCO products throughout the country. ISACO Kish, is one of the subordinate companies of ISACO which is assigned with the task of supplying after-sale services to IKCO vehicles in the international markets. In 2011, 37 percent of the needed spare parts were globally outsourced and ISACO aims to reduce this amount to 23 percent. Iraq, Belarus, Russia, Ukraine, Venezuela, Senegal, Algeria and Tunisia are the main target markets for ISACO.

- Iran Khodro Power Train Co. (IPCO)

IPCO was established in 1998. The main activity of this engineering services company is in the field of power train including design and development, testing, adjusting, product engineering, and quality assurance processes in mass production and design production.

- TAM Co.

This subsidiary of IKCO was found with name "Ghateh Sazan-e Mojarab" in 1997 with the aim of creating cutting-edge has been changed to TAM Co. in 1998.

- SAMAND Investment Co.

Samand Investment Co. was established as a Corporation in 2004 with the purpose of the identification of investment opportunities, analysis and evaluation of the stock market and creating income for shareholders.

- Iran Khodro Rail transport Industries Company (IRICO)

IRICO was established by Iran Khodro Investment Development Company in 2003 to manufacture railway rolling stock. IRICO produces metro wagon, rail bus, light rail vehicle and monorails. In March 2011, Tose-e-Tarabar Raili Iranian Co. acquired RICO from Iran Khodro.

- Iran Khodro Diesel Company

Iran Khodro Diesel Company was established initially under the name of Khawar Industrial Group in early 1966. In 1999 Iran Khodro Company merged its bus and midi-bus production lines with Khawar Industrial Group truck production lines together and the new company Iran Khodro Diesel, public joint stock was established to manufacture different types of commercial vehicles for domestic and overseas markets. Iran Khodro Diesel Company exports its products to many countries.

== See also ==
- Automotive industry in Iran
- List of Iranian companies
- Companies of Pahlavi Iran
