= Haima 8S =

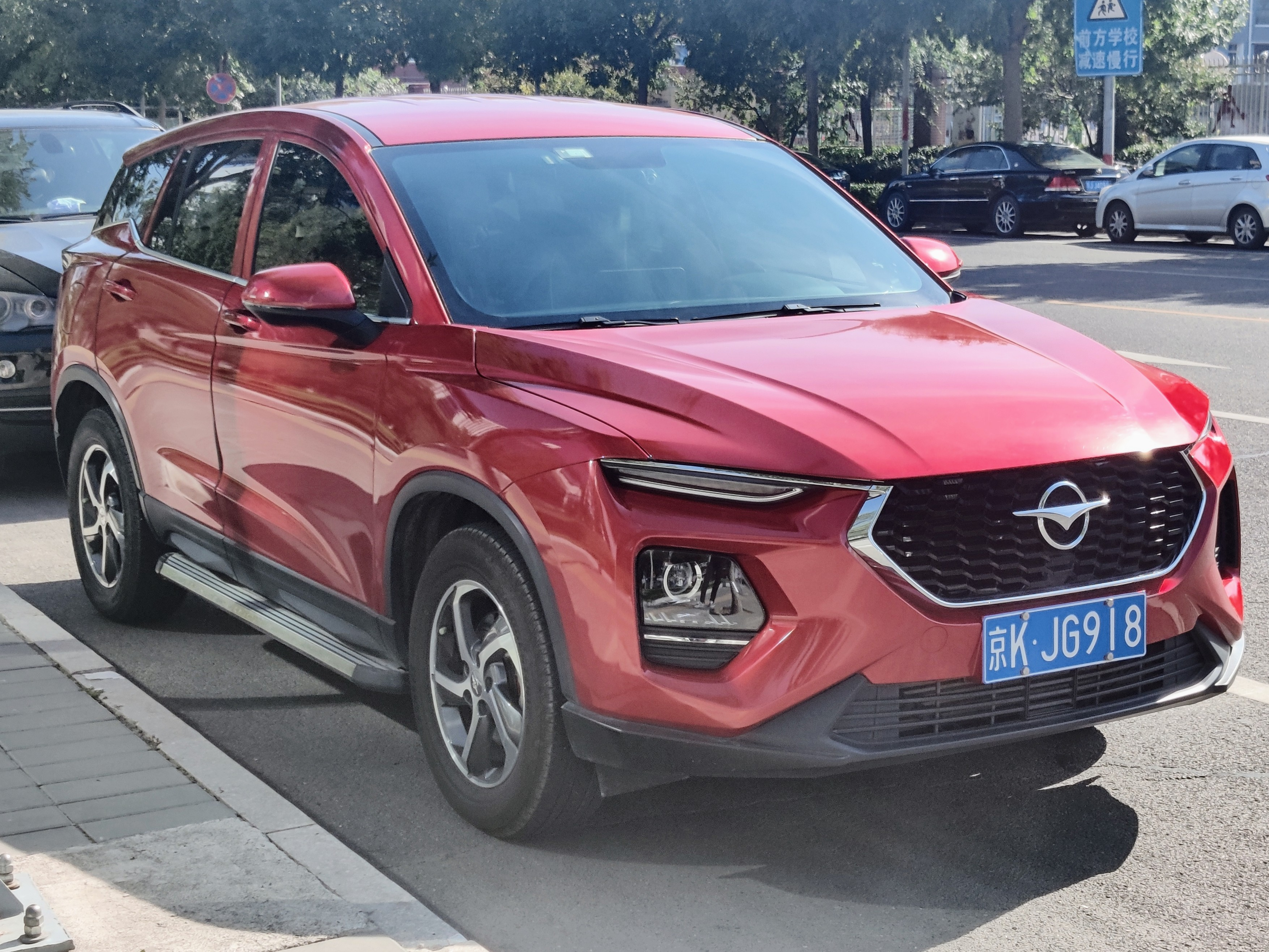

Overview
- Manufacturer: Haima Automobile
- Production: 2019–present
- Assembly: China: Hainan; Iran: Binalud (IKCO Khorasan)

Body and chassis
- Class: Compact crossover SUV
- Body style: 5-door SUV
- Layout: FF layout

Powertrain
- Engine: 1.6 L turbo I4 (petrol)
- Transmission: 6 speed manual 6 speed automatic

Dimensions
- Wheelbase: 2,700 mm (106.3 in)
- Length: 4,565 mm (179.7 in)
- Width: 1,850 mm (72.8 in)
- Height: 1,682 mm (66.2 in)
- Kerb weight: 1,545–1,560 kg (3,406–3,439 lb)

The Haima 8S is a compact crossover SUV that is manufactured by the Chinese manufacturer Haima.

== Overview ==
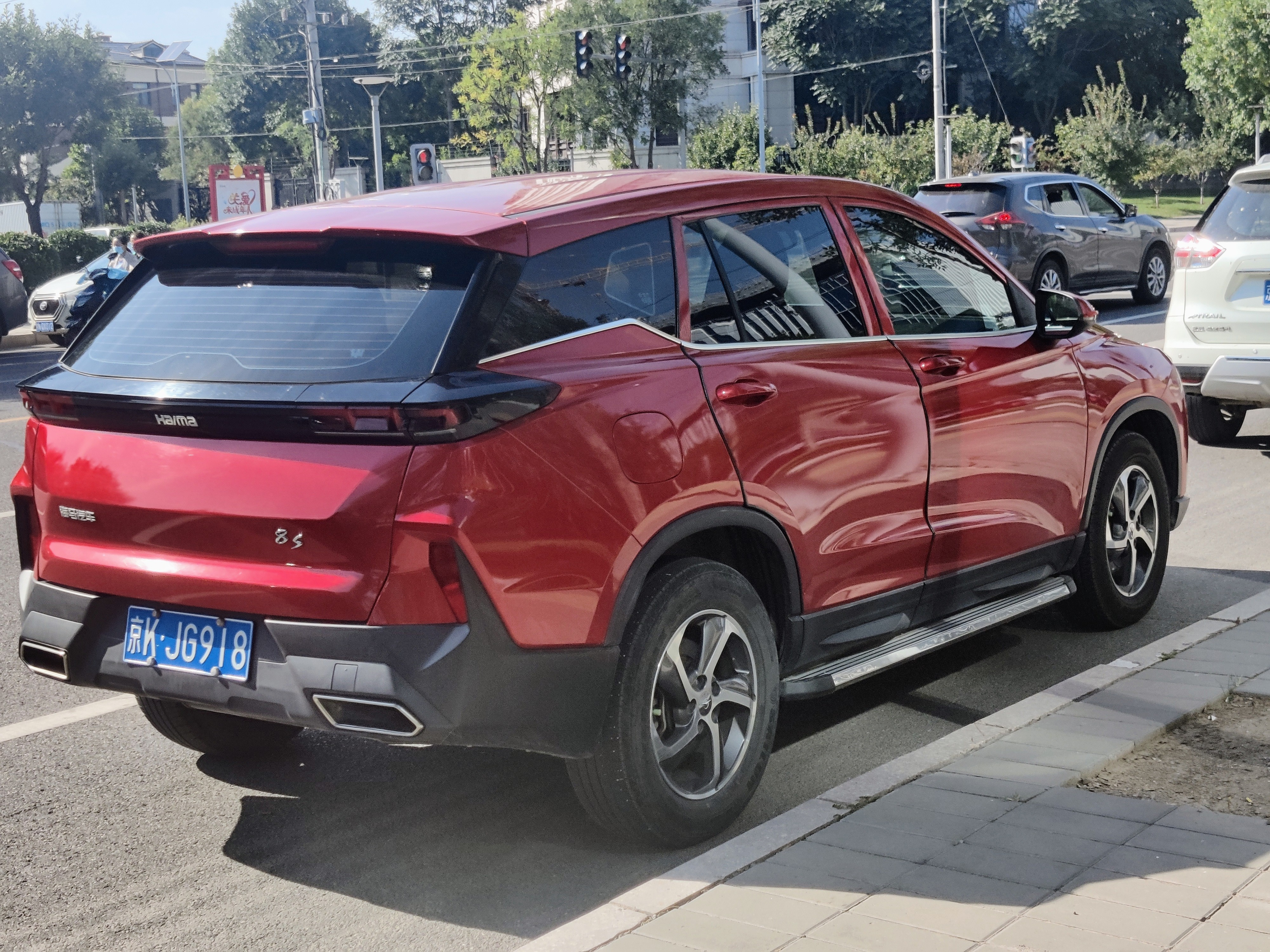
Rear view

The Haima 8S was launched in the Chinese market in July 2019 and is based on the Haima HMGA platform (Haima Global Architecture). The Haima 8S was powered by the Boost Blue Power 1.6 liter TGDI turbo inline-four petrol engine producing 195 hp (145 kW) and 293 Nm mated to a 6-speed manual gearbox, a 6-speed semi-automatic gearbox, or a 7-speed DCT. A 1.2 liter turbo engine hybrid model and mild hybrid versions are set to launch in the future.

== Technical features ==
The Haima 8S comes equipped with the ADAS active safety system and 360 degree camera assist, TPMS, ESP, panoramic sunroof, push-button start, electronic gear shifting with steering mounted paddle shifters, ACC adaptive cruise, AEB, electronically adjustable seats, power rear tailgate, and optional mobile phone wireless charging.
