= Haima S5 =

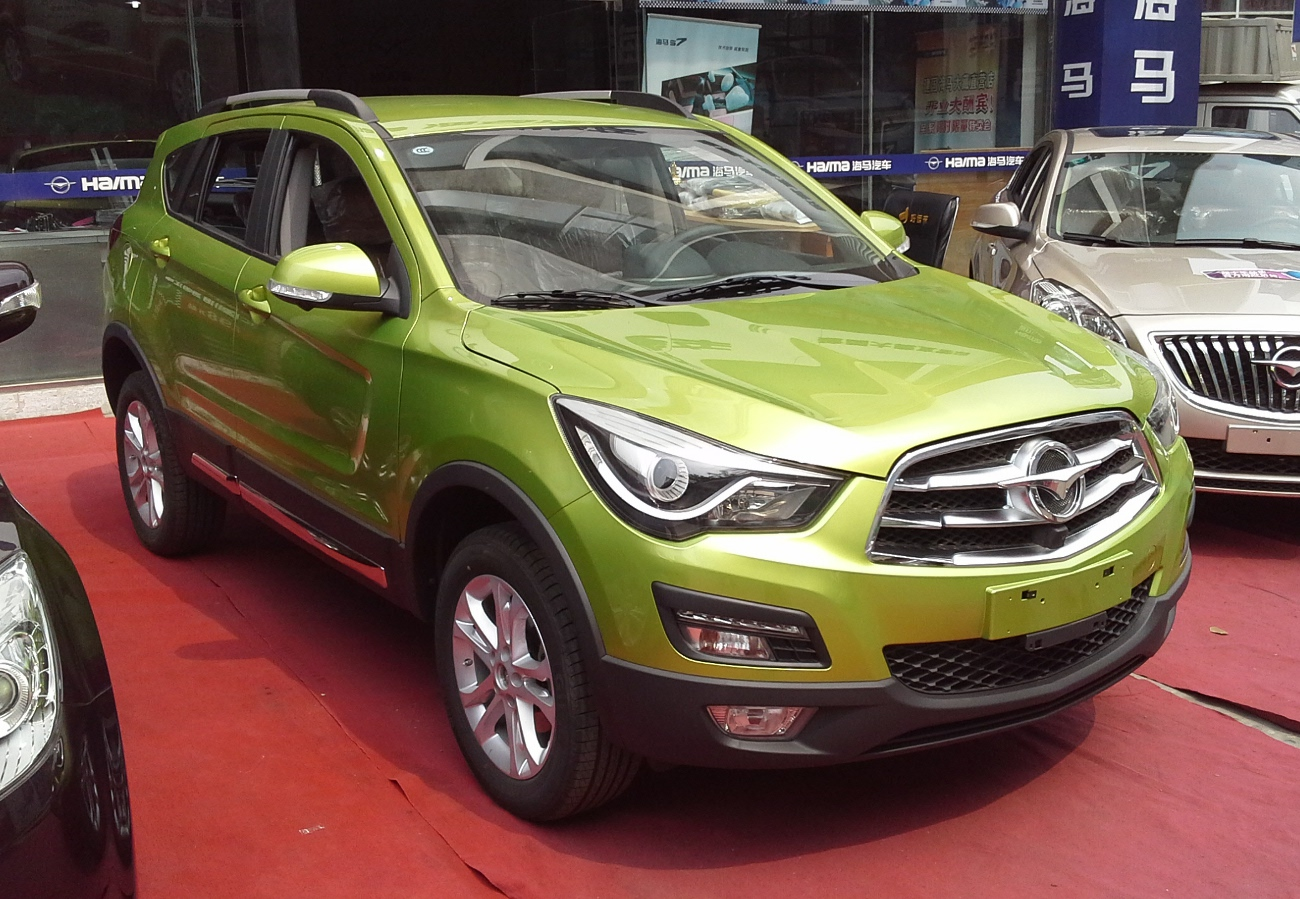

Overview
- Manufacturer: Haima Automobile
- Production: 2014–2021

Body and chassis
- Class: Compact crossover SUV (C)
- Body style: 5-door SUV

The Haima S5 is a compact crossover SUV that is manufactured by the Chinese manufacturer Haima. The first generation model was launched in 2014 and sold through 2017. The second generation Haima S5 launched in 2018 is still based on the same platform and is technically an extensive facelift of the first generation model. The second generation model was launched during the 2018 Beijing Auto Show. As of January 2021, a plug-in hybrid version called the Haima 6P was launched based on the second generation model while utilizing the same basic exterior styling.

== First generation ==
First generation
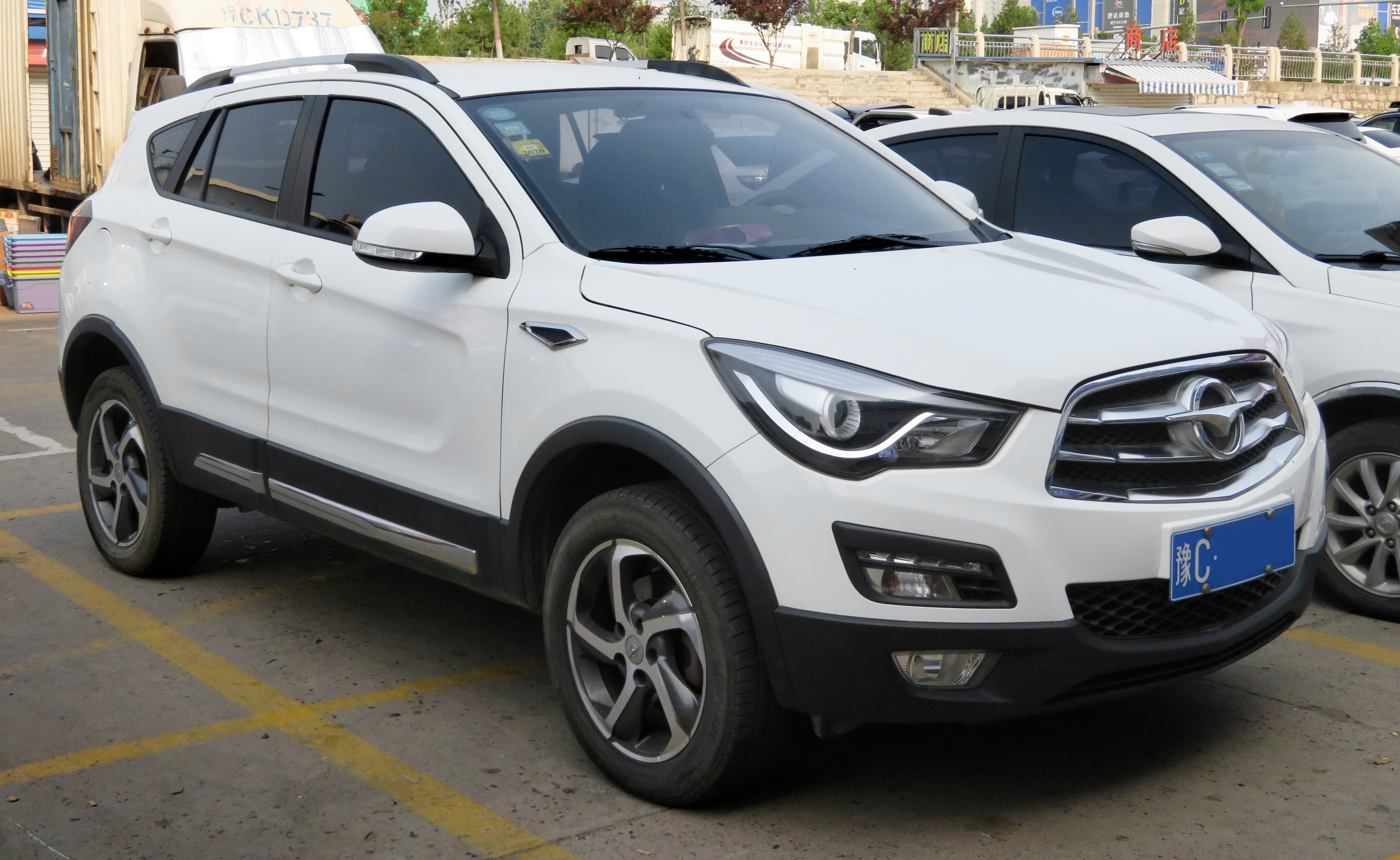

Overview
- Production: 2014–2017
- Assembly: China: Hainan; Iran: Binalud (IKCO Khorasan)

Body and chassis
- Layout: Front-engine, front-wheel-drive

Powertrain
- Engine: 1.5 L turbo I4 (petrol); 1.6 L I4 (petrol)
- Transmission: 5 speed manual; CVT

Dimensions
- Wheelbase: 2,642 mm (104.0 in)
- Length: 4,285 mm (168.7 in)
- Width: 1,818 mm (71.6 in)
- Height: 1,653 mm (65.1 in)
- Curb weight: 1,380–1,460 kg (3,040–3,220 lb)

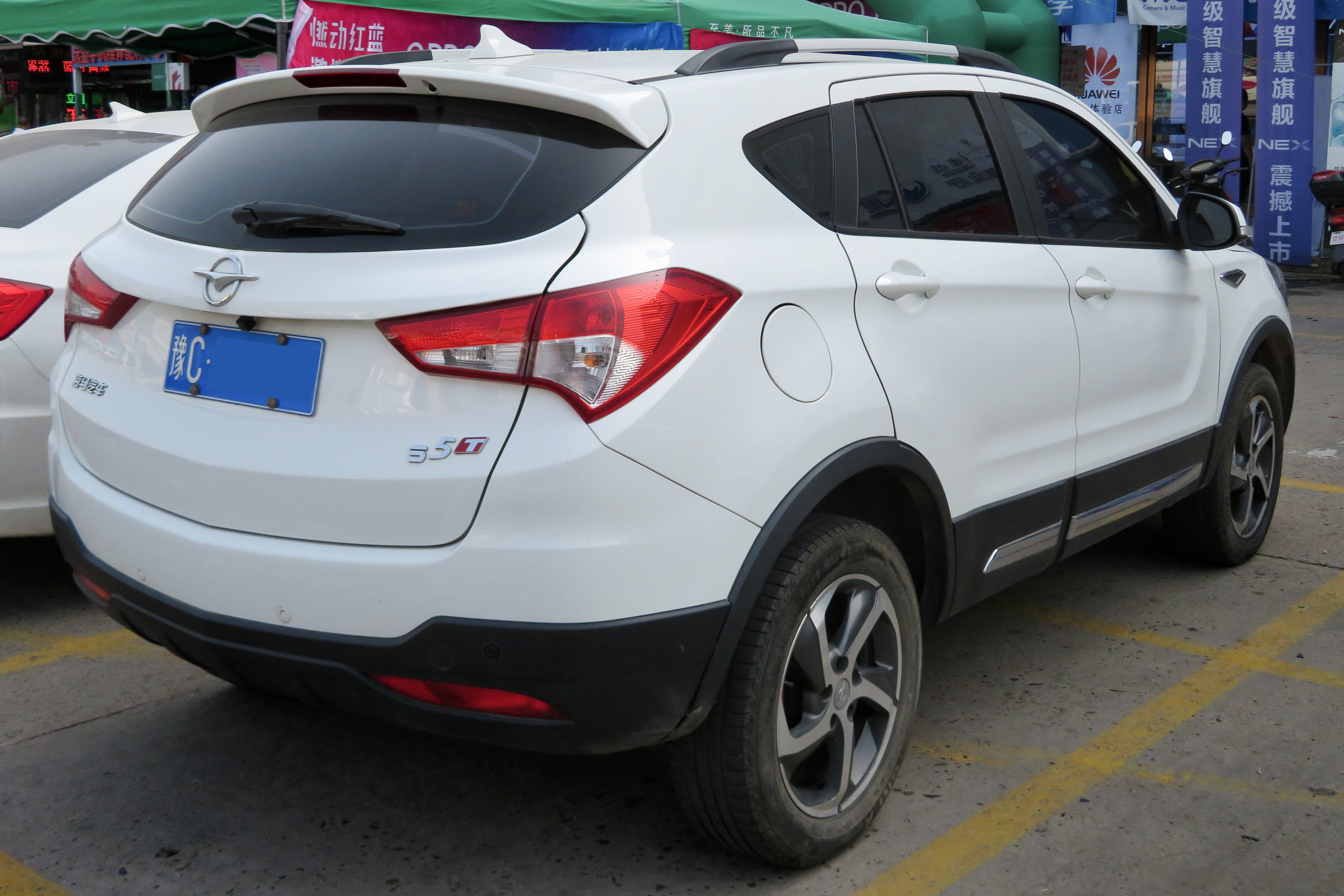
Rear view

The first generation Haima S5 debuted at the 2014 Auto China show in Beijing and was launched in China right after with a price range of 89,800 yuan to 107,800 yuan.

=== Powertrain ===
The Haima S5 was launched in April 2014 with a naturally aspirated 1.6-litre petrol engine with 120hp and 160nm, mated to a five-speed manual gearbox. A turbo version was also available from October 2014 with an output of 163hp and 223nm and will be mated to a CVT.

== Second generation ==
Second generation
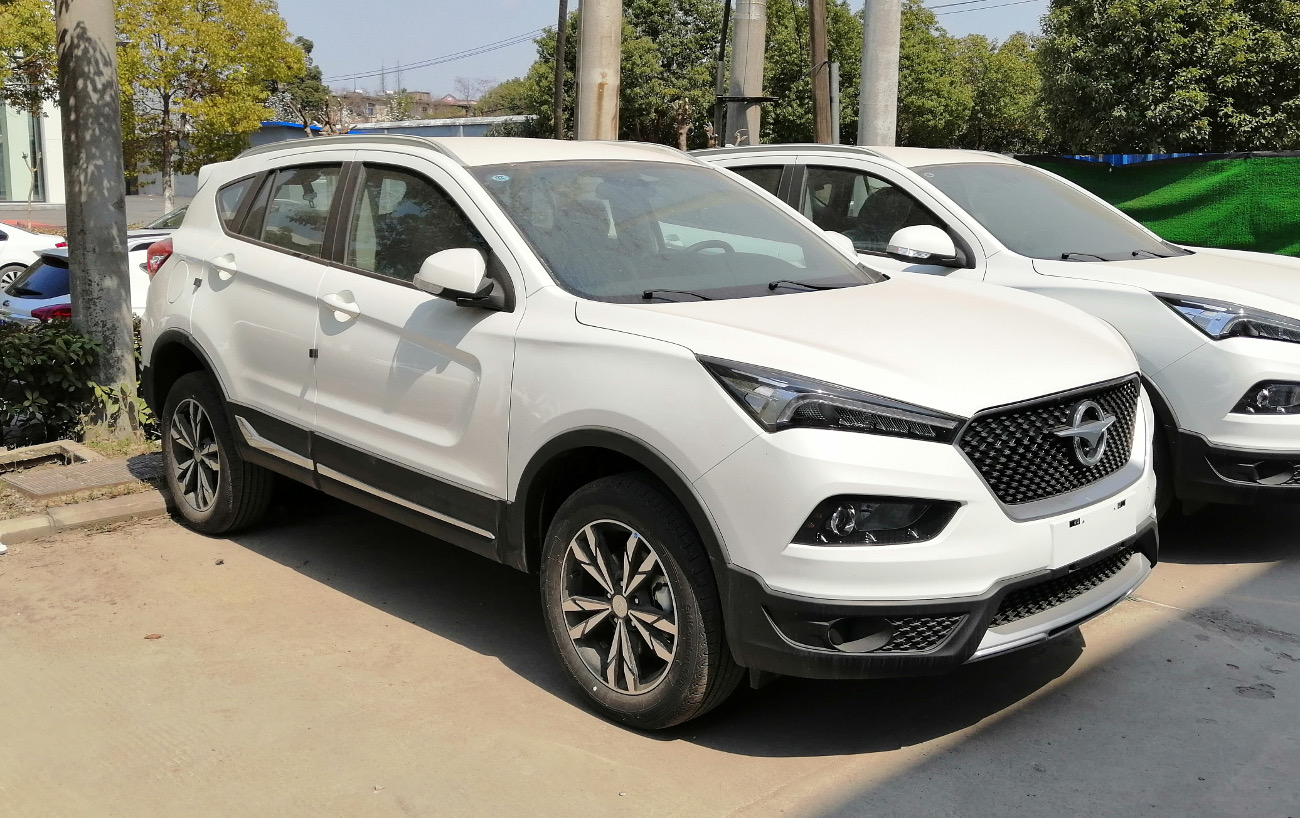

Overview
- Also called: Haima 6P (PHEV)
- Production: 2018–2019 (S5); 2021 (6P)
- Assembly: China: Hainan

Body and chassis
- Layout: Front-engine, front-wheel-drive

Powertrain
- Engine: 1.5 L turbo I4 (petrol); 1.6 L I4 (petrol)
- Transmission: 5 speed manual; 6 speed manual; CVT

Dimensions
- Wheelbase: 2,530 mm (99.6 in)
- Length: 4,358 mm (171.6 in)
- Width: 1,823 mm (71.8 in)
- Height: 1,630 mm (64.2 in)
- Curb weight: 1,380–1,460 kg (3,040–3,220 lb)

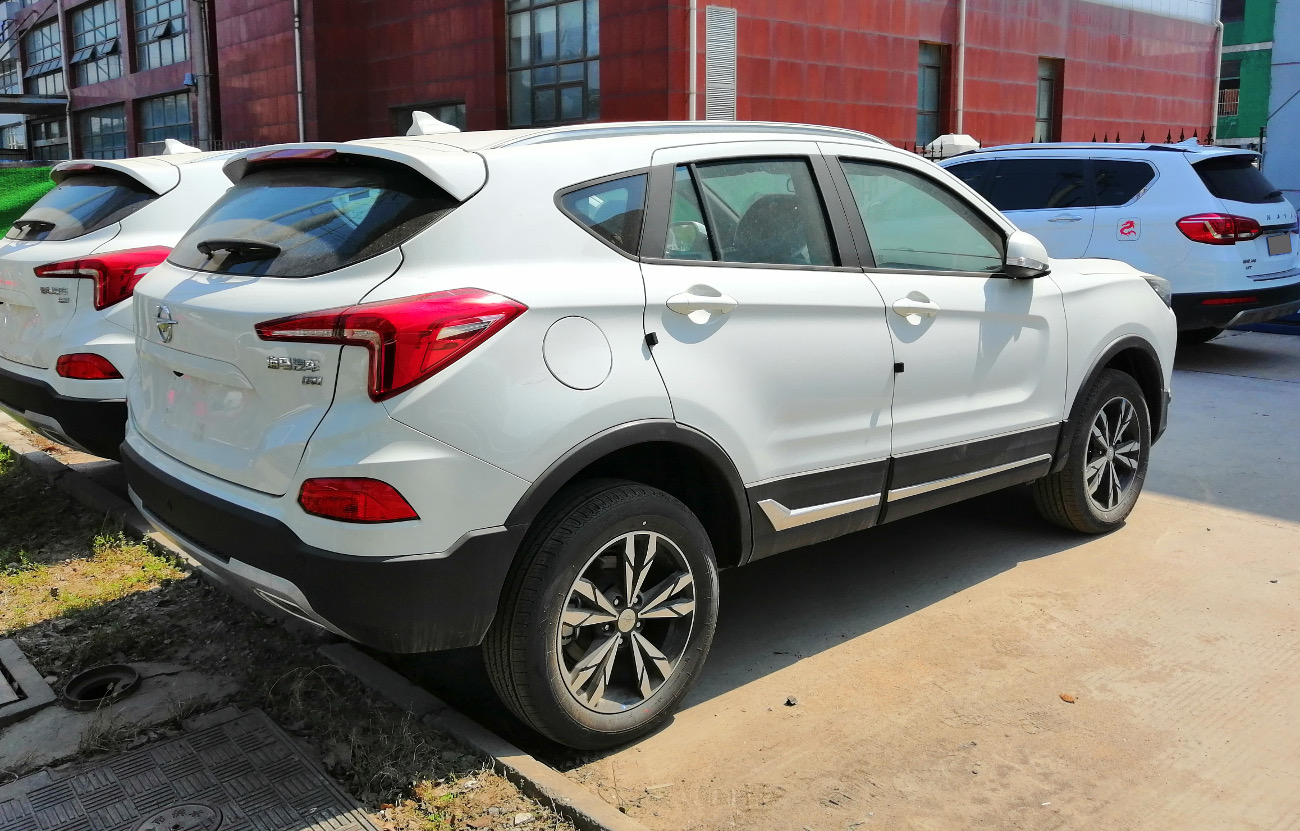
Rear view

Being essentially an extensive facelift, the second generation Haima S5 was launched during the 2018 Beijing Auto Show, featuring restyled front and rear fascias.

=== Powertrain ===
The second generation Haima S5 is available with a 1.6-litre petrol engine mated to a 5-speed manual gearbox, a 1.5-litre petrol turbo engine mated to a 6-speed manual gearbox, a 1.5-litre petrol turbo engine mated to a CVT, a 1.2-litre petrol turbo engine mated to a 6-speed manual gearbox, a 1.2-litre petrol turbo engine mated to a 6-speed automatic gearbox and a 1.2-litre petrol turbo engine mated to a 7-speed DCT.

=== Haima 6P ===
A plug-in hybrid version called the Haima 6P was launched in February 2021. The 6P is based on the second generation Haima S5 model while utilizing the same basic exterior styling. The Haima 6P features a 1.2-litre turbo engine combined with permanent magnetic electric motors. According to officials, the acceleration from 0 to 100km/h is 7.5 seconds. The gearbox is a 7-speed wet DCT. Fuel consumption is 1.38L/100km. The battery is a CATL-supplied NCM811battery module with a density of 142Wh/kg.
