= IKCO Reera =

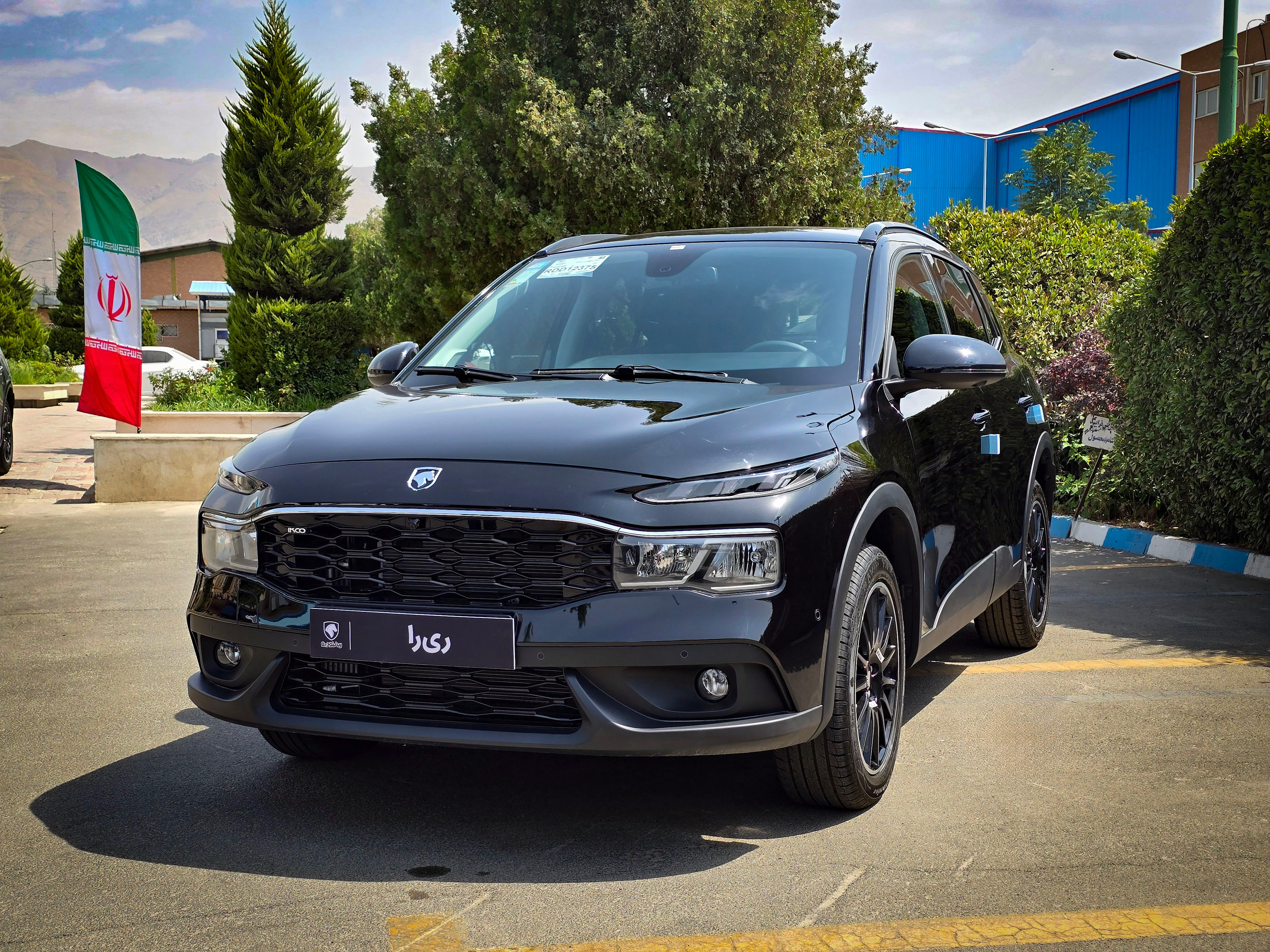

Overview
- Manufacturer: Iran Khodro
- Model code: K125
- Production: 2024–present
- Assembly: Iran: Tehran

Body and chassis
- Class: Compact crossover SUV (C)
- Body style: 5-door crossover SUV
- Layout: Front-engine, front-wheel-drive
- Platform: IKP2
- Related: Peugeot 2008; Opel Mokka; DS 3 Crossback; Citroën C4

Powertrain
- Engine: Petrol: 1.7 L EF7P-TC I4 TC; 1.3L IKCO IK3-TGDI I3 TC
- Transmission: 6-speed automatic 7-speed DCT

Dimensions
- Wheelbase: 2,590 mm (102.0 in)
- Length: 4,334 mm (170.6 in)
- Width: 1,808 mm (71.2 in)
- Height: 1,638 mm (64.5 in)
- Kerb weight: 1,435 kg (3,164 lb)

The IKCO Reera (Persian: ری‌را, code name: K125) is a compact crossover SUV (C-segment) produced by Iranian automaker Iran Khodro. The vehicle is based on their IKP2 platform, which is in turn based on Stellantis's CMP platform.

Mehdi Khatibi, the CEO at the time, introduced the Reera on July 8, 2022, as the first national Iranian crossover. The vehicle will be offered in three different versions.

== History ==
Iran Khodro, which had obtained the rights to produce and platform the Peugeot 301 and Peugeot 2008 during the JCPOA era, introduced and began production of the Tara sedan based on the 301. Afterwards, the company turned to produce its first crossover SUV based on the 2008. The Reera was initially known by the code K125. The model was unveiled in 2022, with registration for purchase beginning on August 15, 2024.

== Technical features ==
=== Platform ===
The Reera does not use the Tara platform with the code IKP1, but rather it has been developed on Iran Khodro's new platform with the code IKP2. This platform is similar to the second-generation Peugeot 2008 platform.

=== Engine ===
The vehicle is powered by a 1.7-liter turbocharged (EF7P-TC) engine, capable of producing 160 horsepower and 240 Nm of torque. This engine is also used in the Dena Javanan model. The turbocharger is supplied by the Chinese company Vofon.

Additionally, in the future, the Reera is expected to be available with the IK3-TGDI three-cylinder engine. This 1.3-liter turbocharged inline 3 engine with dual-variable valve timing for exhaust and intake valves can generate 160 horsepower and 240 Nm of torque.

The EV (Electric Vehicle) variant of the Reera is powered by a single electric motor producing 161 Horsepower and 300 Nm of torque, IKCO claims that the EV variant can reach 100 km/h from standing in 8.8 seconds and can reach a top speed of 180-190 km/h

=== Transmission ===
The EF7P-TC engine is paired with a 6-speed automatic transmission, which is also used in the Dena Plus Turbo Automatic model. For the three-cylinder version, there are reports of a 7-speed dual-clutch transmission being offered.

=== Features ===
The Reera is equipped with features such as a panoramic sunroof, light sensor, rain sensor, four airbags, electric power steering, electronic parking brake, electronic gear shifter, wireless charger, digital dashboard, keyless start, digital speedometer, blind-spot radar, lane-keeping radar, tire pressure and temperature sensors, cornering lights, interior ambient lighting, foot sensor, and an electric trunk lid. Additionally, it offers heated front seats, power-adjustable driver seat, and more. The Reera has also been equipped with an emergency contact system in collaboration with the Space Technology and Advanced Transportation Development Headquarters of the Vice Presidency for Science and Technology.

Moreover, the Reera includes additional features such as traction and stability control, hill start assist, sunroof, automatic climate control, a 12-inch touchscreen multimedia display, a 12-inch digital instrument cluster, rear and 360-degree cameras, power-folding side mirrors, and daytime running lights (DRLs).

== Gallery ==
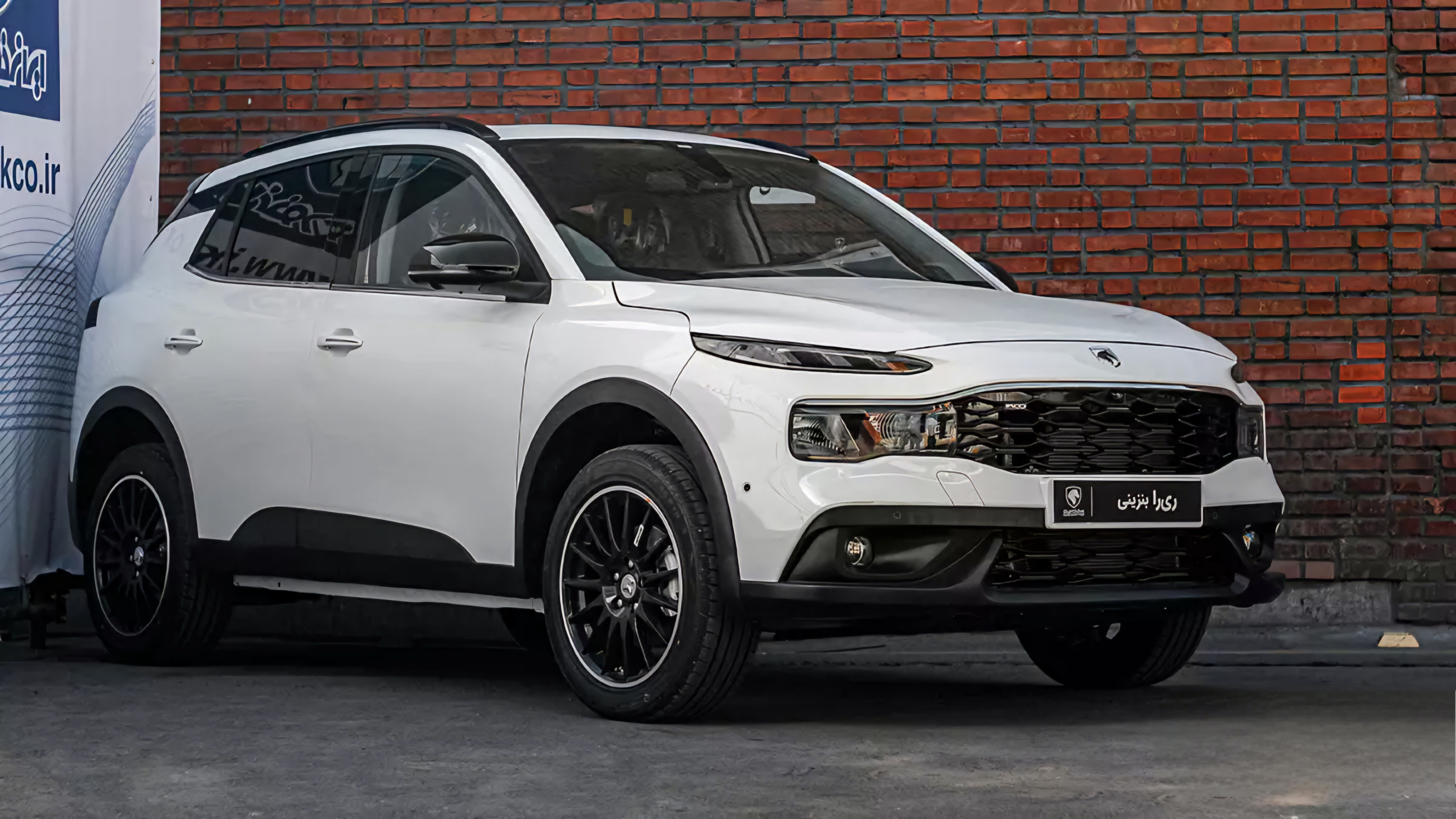
Front view, gasoline model

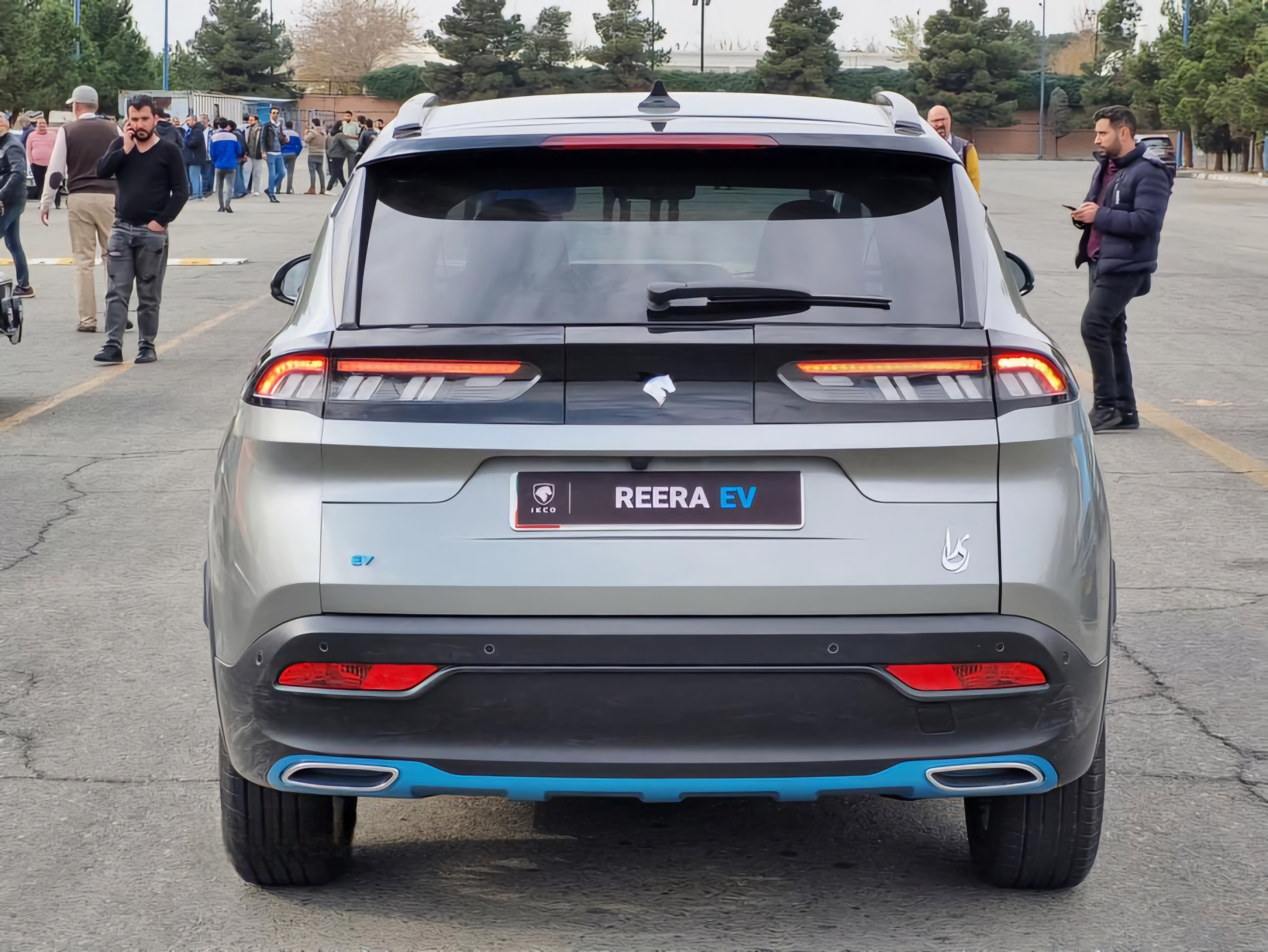
Rear view, EV model

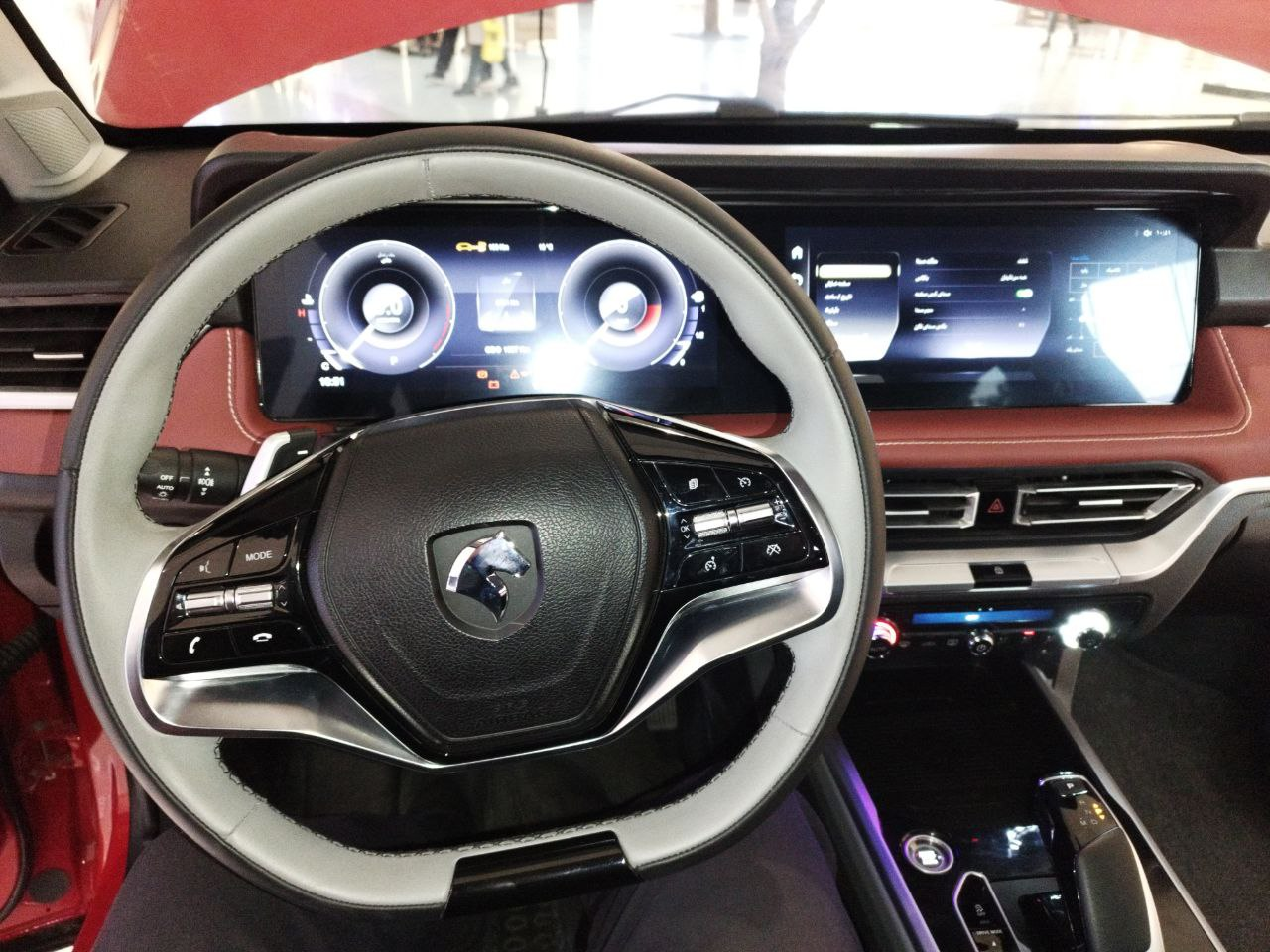
Interior

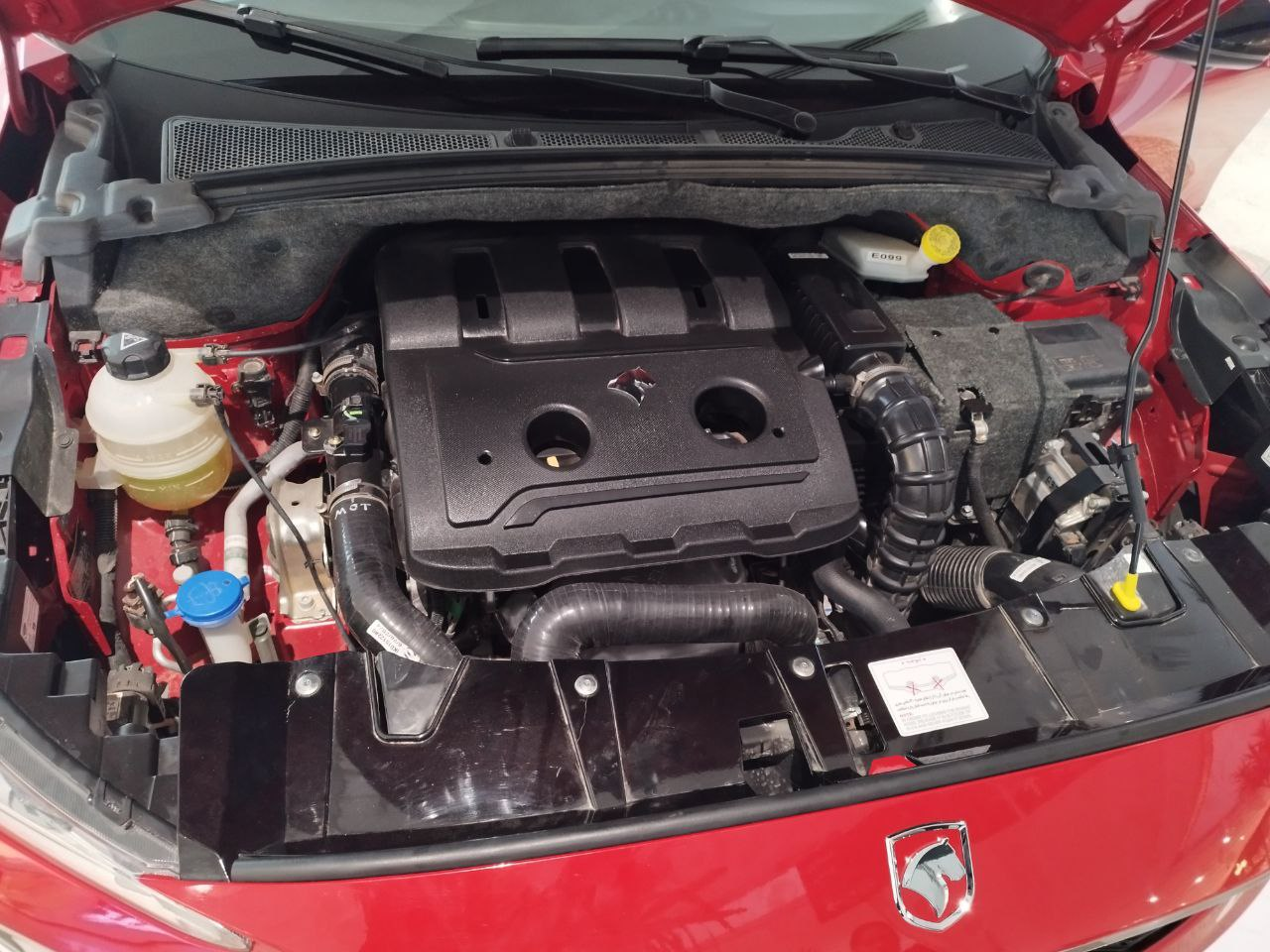
Engine view

== See also ==
- IKCO Tara
