= Venirauto =

Automobile manufacturer

Venirauto Industrias C.A.
- Company type: Corporación anónima
- Industry: Motor vehicles
- Founded: 3 November 2006
- Headquarters: Maracay, Aragua, Venezuela
- Area served: Venezuela
- Key people: Antonio Pérez Suárez (President); Ali Karimi (Vice president)

Venirauto Industrias C.A. is a Venezuelan automobile manufacturing company.

== History ==
Venirauto was founded on November 3, 2006, in Maracay. It is related to Iran Khodro and SAIPA from Iran. The production of automobiles started in 2007. The brand name is Venirauto. At the beginning of 2012, 470 people were employed.

== Vehicles ==
As of November 2016, the lineup consisted of the passenger car models Turpial and Centauro. Both were already introduced in 2007.

It offers a four-cylinder engine with 1323 cm^{3} and 62 PS (61 hp). The wheelbase of the Turpial is 2345 mm, the length is 3935 mm and the height is 1455 mm.

The vehicle is 4935 mm long and 1460 mm high. The curb weight is given as 1285 kg.

== Production figures ==
On June 20, 2015, the then President Francisco Espinoza celebrated the completion 20,000 vehicles.
