= Haima 7 =

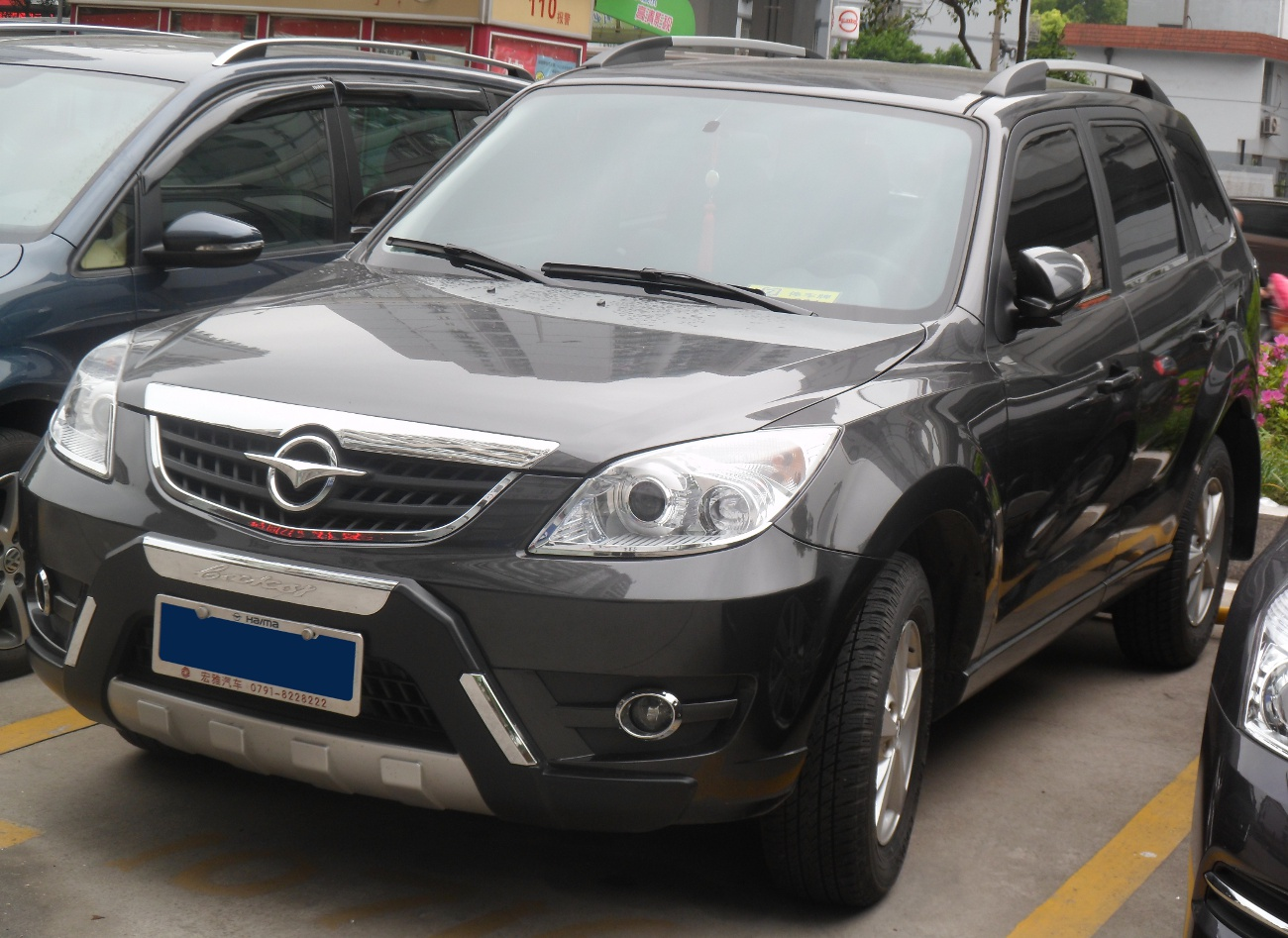

Overview
- Manufacturer: Haima Automobile
- Also called: Haima S7; Haima S7+; Haima S7 Pro
- Production: 2010–2020
- Assembly: China: Hainan; Iran: Binalud (IKCO Khorasan)

Body and chassis
- Class: Compact crossover SUV
- Body style: 5-door SUV

Powertrain
- Engine: 1.8 L HM484Q-T I4 (turbo petrol); 2.0 L HM484Q I4 (petrol)
- Transmission: 6-speed manual; 5-speed manual; 6-speed automatic; 5-speed automatic

Dimensions
- Wheelbase: 2,619 mm (103.1 in)
- Length: 4,421–4,456 mm (174.1–175.4 in)
- Width: 1,830 mm (72.0 in)
- Height: 1,740 mm (68.5 in)
- Curb weight: 1,435–1,495 kg (3,164–3,296 lb)

The Haima S7 or Haima 7 is a compact crossover SUV produced by Chinese manufacturer Haima.

== Overview ==
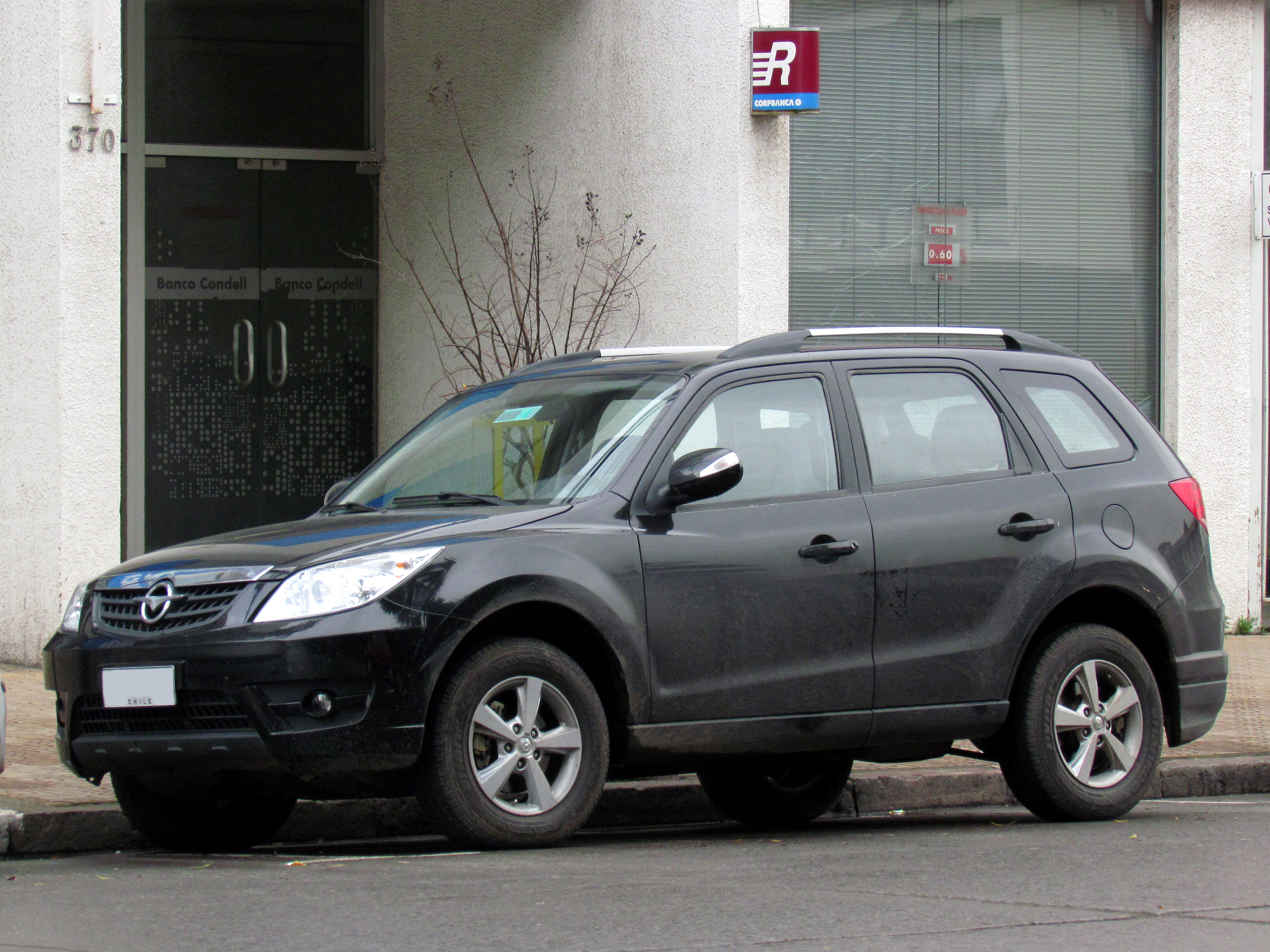
Haima S7 (pre-facelift)

The Haima S7 debuted at the 2010 Auto China show as the Haima 7 and is being sold since July 2010 in China. The Haima S7 is powered by a 2.0-litre four-cylinder engine developing 150 hp and 180 nm with a top speed of 165 km/h (103 mph) mated to a 5-speed manual transmission and a later added 5-speed automatic transmission. The acceleration of the S7 from 0 to 100 km/h is 14.9 seconds.

=== 2013 facelift ===
A name change to Haima S7 was done in 2011 and a subtle facelift was received in 2013. The facelifted model debuted on the Shanghai Auto Show in April 2013.

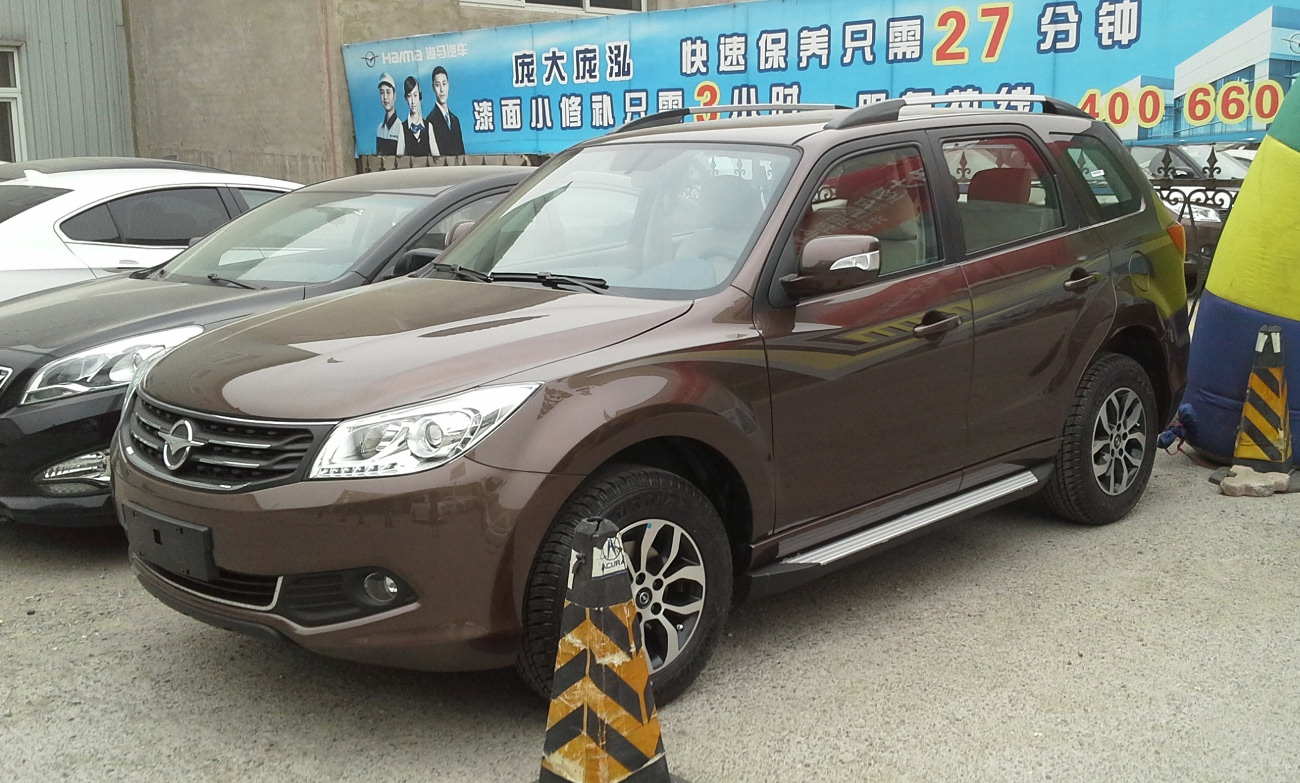
Haima S7 2011 (facelift)

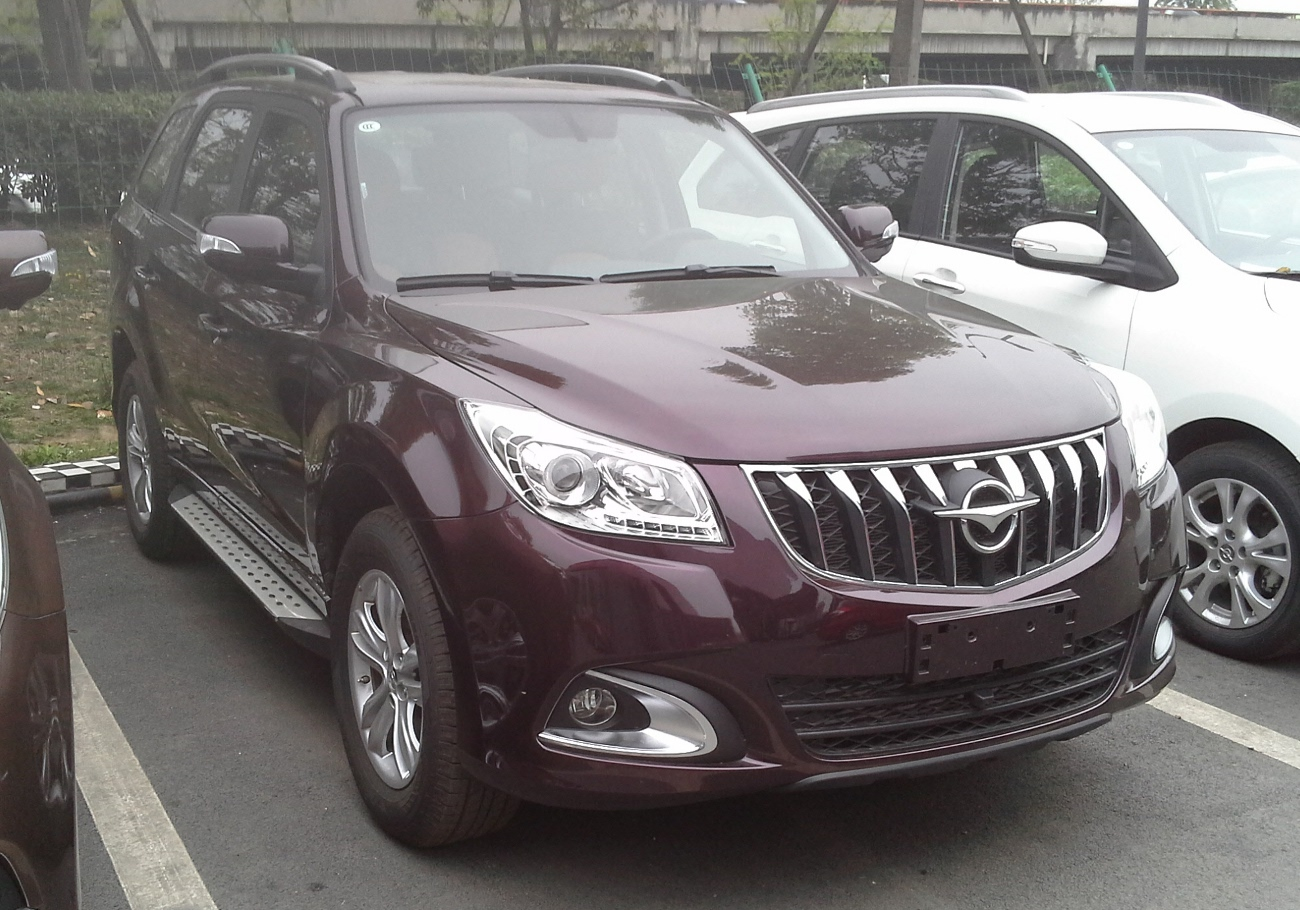
Haima S7 2013 (facelift)

=== 2015 facelift ===
The vehicle was revised and facelifted for the second time in 2015, and a third facelift launched on the Chinese car market in October 2016.

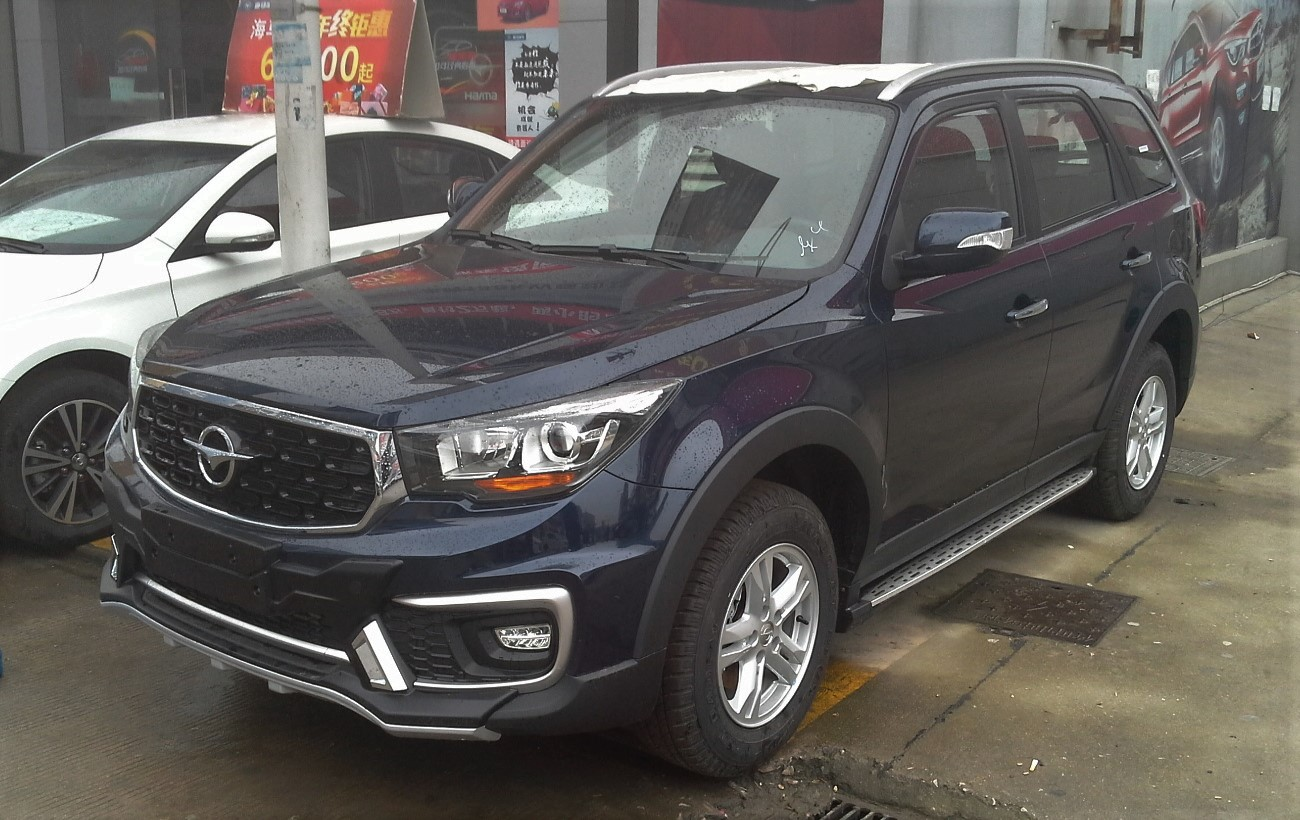
Haima S7 2016 (facelift)

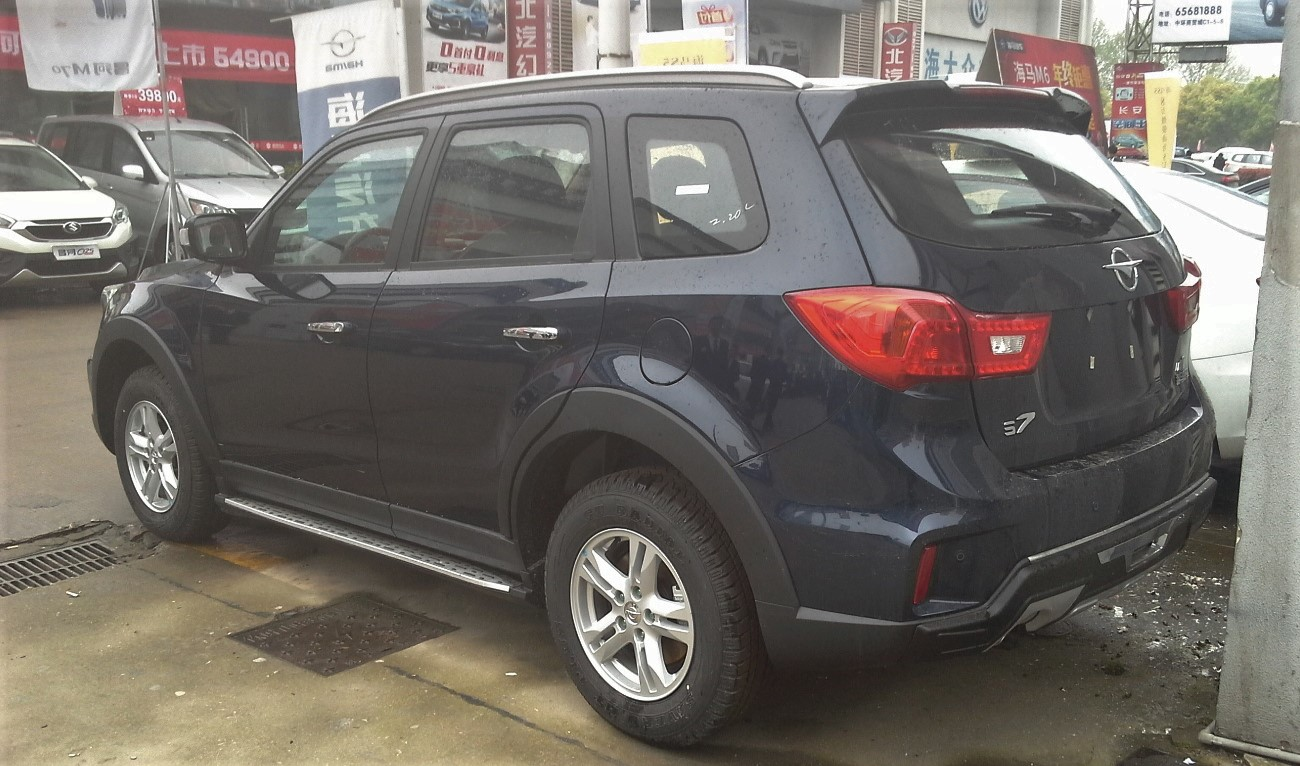
Rear view
