= IKAP =

Iranian automobile manufacturer; joint venture of Iran Khodro and Stellantis

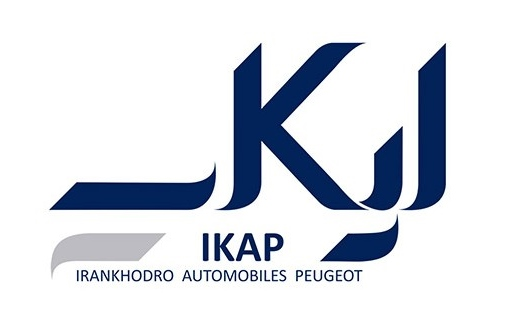
- Company type: Joint venture
- Industry: Automotive
- Founded: 2016; 10 years ago
- Headquarters: Iran, Tehran
- Area served: Worldwide
- Key people: Ashkan Farbod (CEO)
- Products: Automobiles; Luxury vehicles; Commercial vehicles; Automotive parts
- Services: Automotive finance; Vehicle leasing; Vehicle service
- Owners: Iran Khodro (50%); Peugeot (50%)
- Website: ikco-peugeot.ir

IKAP (Iran Khodro Automobiles Peugeot) is a joint venture between Iran Khodro and Stellantis, based in Tehran; it was established in 2016. It produces some Peugeot models and imports other models in CBU for Iran market.

The company was created to manufacture Peugeot products in Iran and export them to the Middle East and to serve as Peugeot's production hub in West Asia. Initial products were Peugeot 2008, Peugeot 208, Peugeot 301 and Peugeot 508.
