= Peugeot 405 =

Large family car produced by Peugeot (1987–2022)

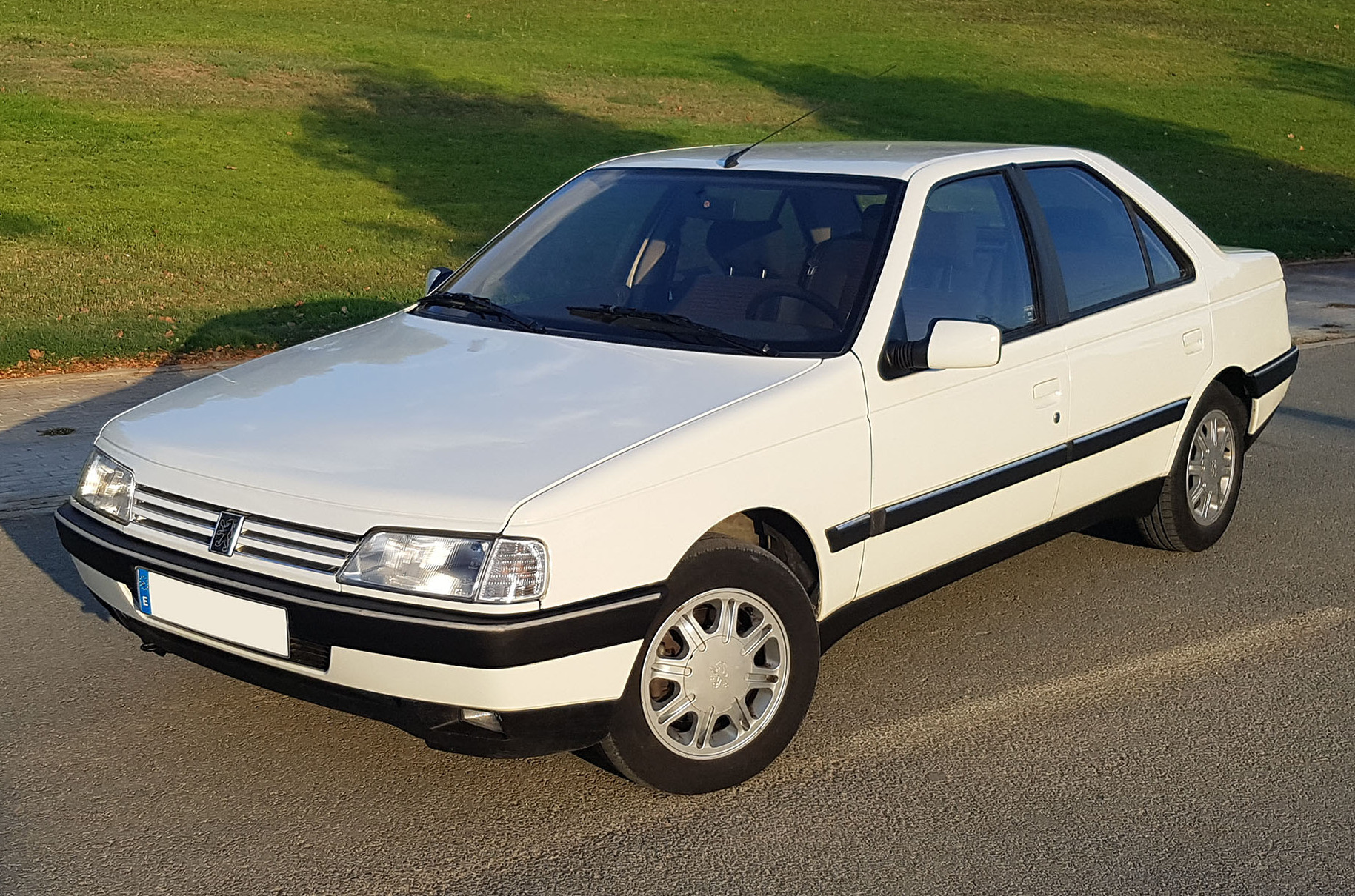

Overview
- Manufacturer: Peugeot
- Also called: Peugeot Pars
- Production: 1987–1997 (Europe); 1992–2022 (Iran); 2019–2023 (Azerbaijan)
- Assembly: France: Sochaux (PSA Peugeot Sochaux: 1987–1997); Argentina: Villa Bosch (Sevel: 1992–2000); Azerbaijan: Neftchala (Khazar: 2019–2022); Chile: Los Andes (Franco Chilena: 1988–2001); Egypt: Cairo (AAV: 1992–2013); Indonesia: Jakarta (Gaya Motor: 1989–1997); Iran: Tehran (Iran Khodro: 1992–2022); Malaysia: Johor Bahru (OASB); Poland: Lublin (FSC: 1993–1995); Taiwan: Changhua:(Yu-Tien Motors: 1989–1995); United Kingdom: Ryton-on-Dunsmore (Ryton plant: 1987–1997); Zimbabwe: Mutare (Quest Motor Manufacturing: 1987–2002)
- Designer: Giuseppe Randazzo of Pininfarina

Body and chassis
- Class: Large family car
- Body style: 4-door saloon 5-door estate
- Layout: Front engine Front-wheel drive Four-wheel drive
- Related: Citroën BX; IKCO Samand; IKCO Soren; IKCO Dena

Powertrain
- Engine: Petrol: 1360 cc TU3 I4; 1587 cc TU5 I4; 1580 cc XU5 I4; 1761 cc XU7 I4; 1905 cc XU9 I4; 1905 cc XU9 J4 16V I4; 1998 cc XU10 I4; 1998 cc XU10 J4 16V I4; 1998 cc XU10 J4TE turbo 16V I4; Diesel: 1769 cc XUD7 TE TD I4; 1905 cc XUD9 I4; 1905 cc XUD9 TE TD I4
- Transmission: 5-speed manual 4-speed ZF 4HP14 automatic

Dimensions
- Wheelbase: 2,669 mm (105.1 in)
- Length: 4,408 mm (173.5 in) (sedan)
- Width: 1,716 mm (67.6 in) (sedan)
- Height: 1,390 mm (55 in)-1,450 mm (57 in)
- Curb weight: 1,020 kg (2,250 lb)-1,430 kg (3,150 lb)

Chronology
- Predecessor: Peugeot 305; Peugeot 404; Peugeot 505; Talbot Alpine/Solara
- Successor: Peugeot: Peugeot 406; Iran Khodro: Peugeot Pars Peugeot RD IKCO Samand

The Peugeot 405 is a large family car manufactured by the French automaker Peugeot from 1987 to 1997. Its production continued under license from outside Europe in Iran by Iran Khodro Company until 2020. It was voted European Car of the Year for 1988 by the largest number of votes in the history of the contest. About 2.5 million vehicles have been sold worldwide, both in left and right drive versions, as a saloon and estate. In early 2020, the 33-year production run of the Peugeot 405 was counted as the "twentieth most long-lived single generation car in history."

Its appearance is similar to the Alfa Romeo 164, launched the same year and also styled by Pininfarina. While the 405 shares its floorpan with the Citroën BX, it does not have that car's hydropneumatic suspension, except for the 4x4 version on the rear axle (SRix4, Mi16x4 and T16). As with the BX, the 405 used TU/XU petrol and XUD diesel engines. The 405 was the last Peugeot vehicle sold in the United States, on sale between 1988 and 1991, including the Mi16.

The 405 has been available as a saloon and estate, in front-wheel and four-wheel drive. No coupé model was ever offered, unlike the 504 and later 406: only two examples of the purpose-built, two-door 405 Turbo 16 (not to be confused with 405 T16) were made.

== History ==
In July 1987, Peugeot unveiled ten versions of the 405 saloon simultaneously for the 1988 model year, with sales on the continent beginning in October 1987 and sales in the United Kingdom beginning in January 1988. It succeeded the long-running Peugeot 305, but also the Chrysler Alpine hatchback and Solara saloon which had been discontinued when the Talbot brand was axed a year earlier. The slightly smaller 305 was discontinued from the Peugeot range soon after the 405's launch, with production of the larger 505 ending a few years later. Peugeot's new range-topping model after 1989 was the larger 605.

Estate sales began in May 1988, although the British market did not receive estate versions until October 1988. No coupé was ever offered to the public, unlike the 504 and later 406. Right hand drive versions being produced at the former plant of Rootes/Chrysler at Ryton near Coventry, and left hand drive production taking place at Sochaux in France.

Four cylinder petrol engines ranging from 1.4 to 1.9 liters and 65 to 160 hp (48 to 118 kW) were available. In 1988, naturally aspirated (1.9) and turbocharged (1.8) diesel engines were added to the range. The 500,000th 405 was produced during 1989, followed by the one millionth 405 to leave the Sochaux factory in 1990. This was also when the BE1 transmission was replaced by the BE3.

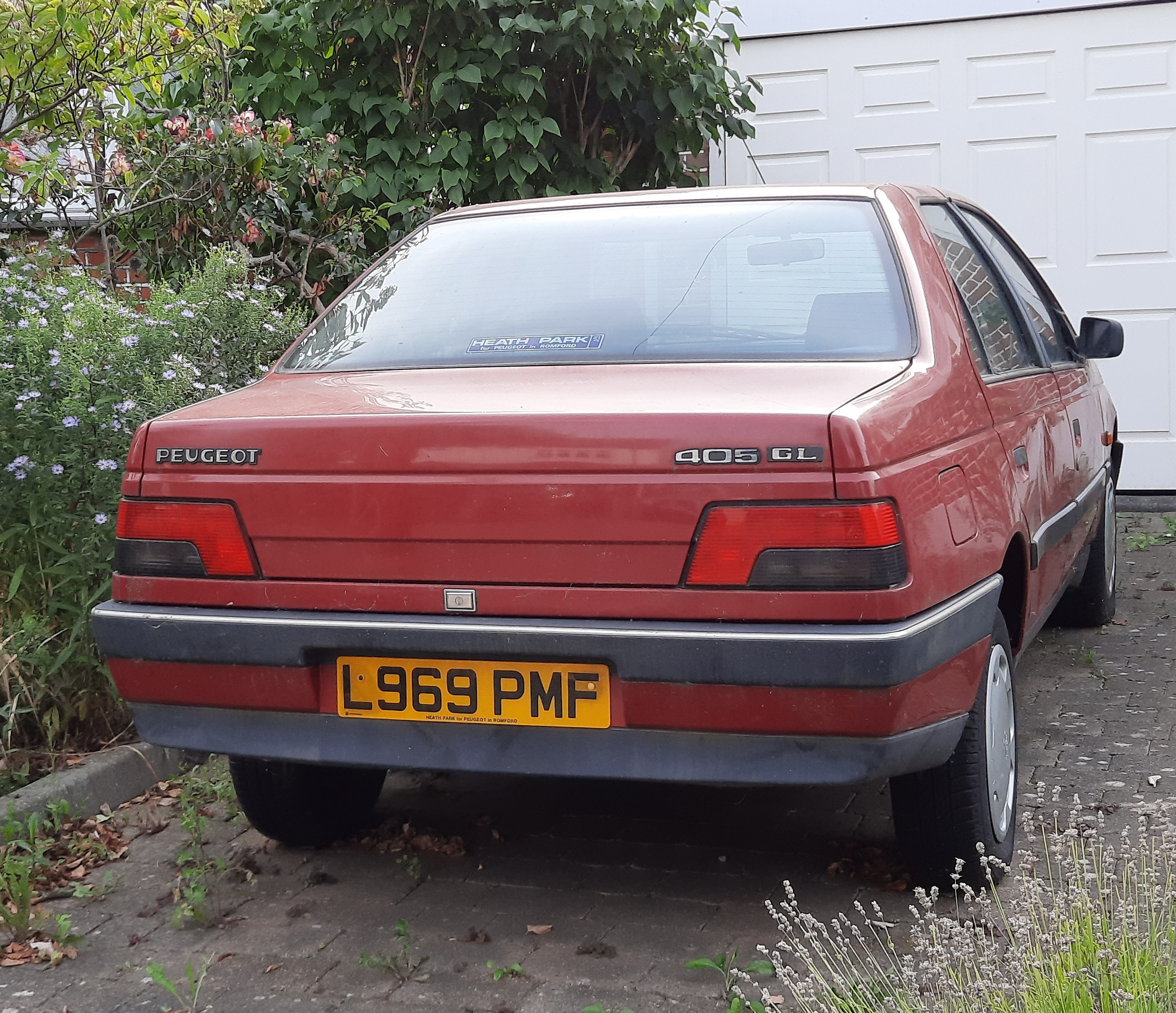
1993 Peugeot 405 GL (post-facelift)

In 1991, there were updates to the dashboard, steering wheel, and soundproofing, but for 1992, the Phase II model arrived with a new boot with better ingress, new rear lights and boot design, and a new dashboard. 405 production had reached over 1,500,000 by this time.

In the autumn of 1995, the 405's replacement, the 406 was introduced and the 405 saloon was discontinued. An airbag had been available on the 405 since 1994, and standard on the left hand drive Mi16 and T16. At the beginning of 1997, the estate version of the 406 was launched, marking the end of European 405 production after ten years.

The 405 was one of Europe's best selling larger family cars, particularly in France and Britain. It was the eighth best selling car in Britain in 1992 and 1993. The 405 also became a popular model in Thailand, following the success of the Peugeot 505 after the Government of Thailand cancelled a restriction on CBU car imports in the late 1980s.

== Manufacturing ==
Designed in France, the Peugeot 405 has been manufactured in:

- Europe: from 1987 to 1997 at Sochaux (France) and Ryton (United Kingdom).
- Zimbabwe: until 2002, by Quest.
- Egypt: Wagih Abaza produced the 405.
- Iran: produced by Iran Khodro from 1991 to 2020.
- Chile: Produced by Franco-Chilena in Los Andes, including STI Phase II model.
- Argentina: Several saloon models, including diesels, were built in the Villa Bosch Peugeot facility from 1992 to 1999. In this country, the 405 has been an extremely popular car with total sales of over 500,000 units.
- Poland: Around 4000 were assembled in FSC Lublin between 1992 and 1995.
- Taiwan: Produced by Yu-Tien Motors from 1989 until 1995 (Production ceased after bankruptcy).
- Thailand: Produced by YMC Assembly Co., Ltd. from 1989 until 1997
- Azerbaijan: Produced by Khazar Iran Khodro at the Neftchala Industrial District since 2019.

== Versions ==
The 405 range included three petrol engines and two diesel engines, all four cylinders, in a variety of states of tune and specification. The range was tailored to suit different export markets. The 1.6 litre saloon featured a low drag co efficient of Cd=0.29, with other models varying up to Cd=0.33. The 1.4 litre (1,360 cc) engine was fitted with a four-speed manual gearbox. It produces 70 hp (51 kW) at 5,600 rpm.

The 1.6 litre (1,580 cc) engine was fitted with a five speed manual gearbox and produced 92 hp (69 kW) at 6,000 rpm. The 1.9 litre (1,905 cc) engine was available with a five speed manual gearbox, with an option of an automatic in the lower powered version.

The eight valve version of the 1905 cc engine was available in two levels of tune; 110 hp (81 kW) or 125 hp (92 kW), with numbers varying somewhat depending on the year and the market. A 16-valve version was available with the Mi16 model and this produced 160 hp (118 kW) at 6,500 rpm and could reach a top speed of 220 km/h (137 mph). The catalyzed version produces 148 hp (109 kW) with a top speed of 214 km/h (133 mph).

In 1992, the range was facelifted. While the changes were deep, including a modified bottom plate and chassis structure, the design was almost indistinguishable from the pre-facelift model.

The windscreens became bonded; all of these changes increased torsional rigidity considerably while still allowing a deeper opening for the bootlid of the sedan. The taillights were also redesigned and the trim piece between them removed, all in the image of the bigger 605. The interior was also redone, with an all new dashboard and door trim, inheriting many detail parts as well as the overall appearance from the 605.

In April 1993, the T16 was introduced to celebrate the successes of the competition model, with a 2.0 litre 16 valve turbocharged XU10J4TE engine with water cooled chargecooler, constant four wheel drive with 53/47% power distribution and self regulating hydraulic rear axle. It was never built in a right hand drive model.

The T16 produced 200 hp (147 kW) at 1.1 bar (16 psi) (normal boost) or 220 hp (162 kW) at 1.3 bar (19 psi) (overboost) which lasts for 45 seconds. 1,061 examples were built, with ten of these being delivered for use by the National Gendarmerie. The diesel engine options included a 1.9 litre (1,905 cc) unit producing 70 hp (51 kW) at 4,600 rpm or a turbocharged 1.8 litre (1,769 cc) unit producing 90 hp (66 kW).

=== Britain ===
At launch in January 1988, the 405 was available with a choice 1.6, and 1.9 carbureted engines, and an injected 1.9. Both diesel and petrol engines were available at launch.

- Late 1988: debut of the performance model, the Mi 16. Addition of the estate and a 1.8 litre turbo diesel.
- Late 1989: four wheel drive Mi16x4, GRiX4 were added.
- 1990: Update to dashboard.
- 1992: Updates to interior, 1.9s petrol engine replaced by a catalysed 2.0.
- 1994: power steering and remote central locking become standard on all models. Driver's airbag added.
- 1995: Executive and Quasar models added.
- 1996: 405 saloon replaced by the 406. Estate revised and sold until replaced by the 406 estate in 1997.

Other engines included 1.4, 1.6, and 1.8. Other styles included the GE, GL, GLx4, GLD, GLDT, GR, GTXi, GTXDT, Le Mans, LX, Mi, Style D, Style DT, Quasar, SRi, SRDT, STi, and STDT.

=== North America ===
Three versions of the 405 sedan were sold in North America from the end of 1988; the 1.9-liter DL and the well equipped S (with standard leather seats), both with 110 hp (82 kW), and the Mi16 with 150 hp (112 kW). The DL and S were also available in wagon form, called Sportswagon. Peugeot withdrew from the markets in the United States and Canada after the model year of 1991.

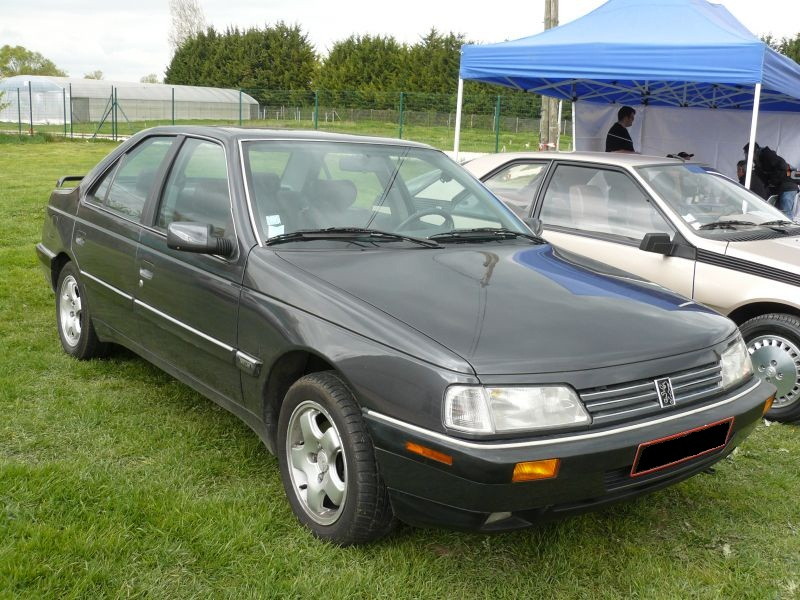
Peugeot 405 Mi 16 (United States)

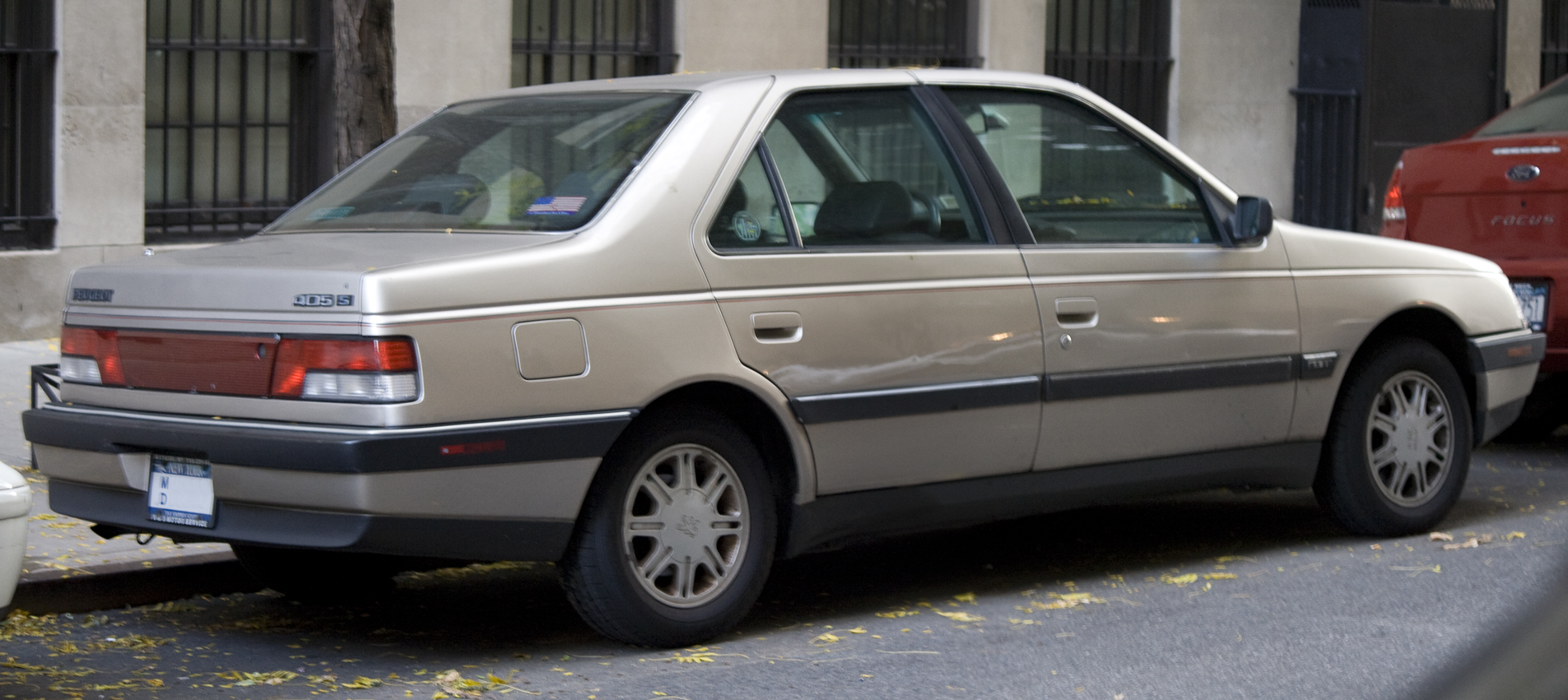
1991 American Peugeot 405 S (last year available, showing slightly altered rear end)

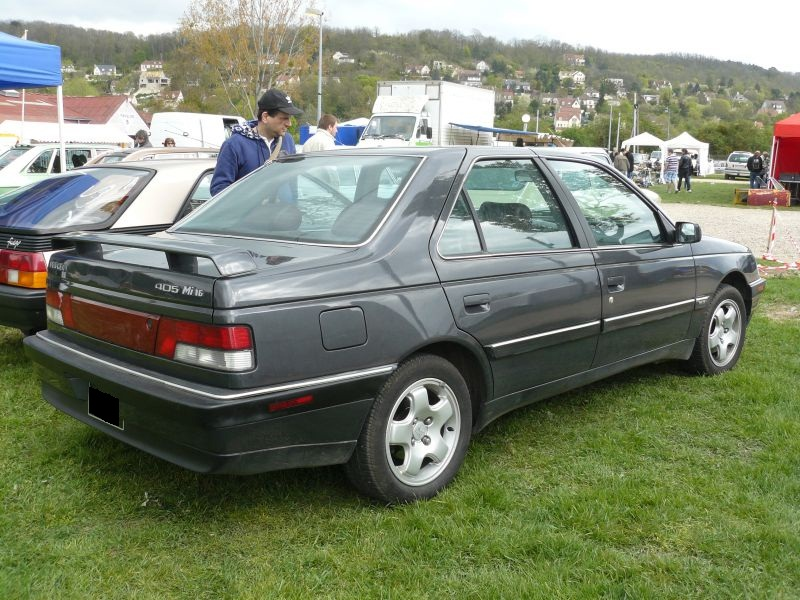
Peugeot 405 Mi 16 (United States)

=== Iran ===
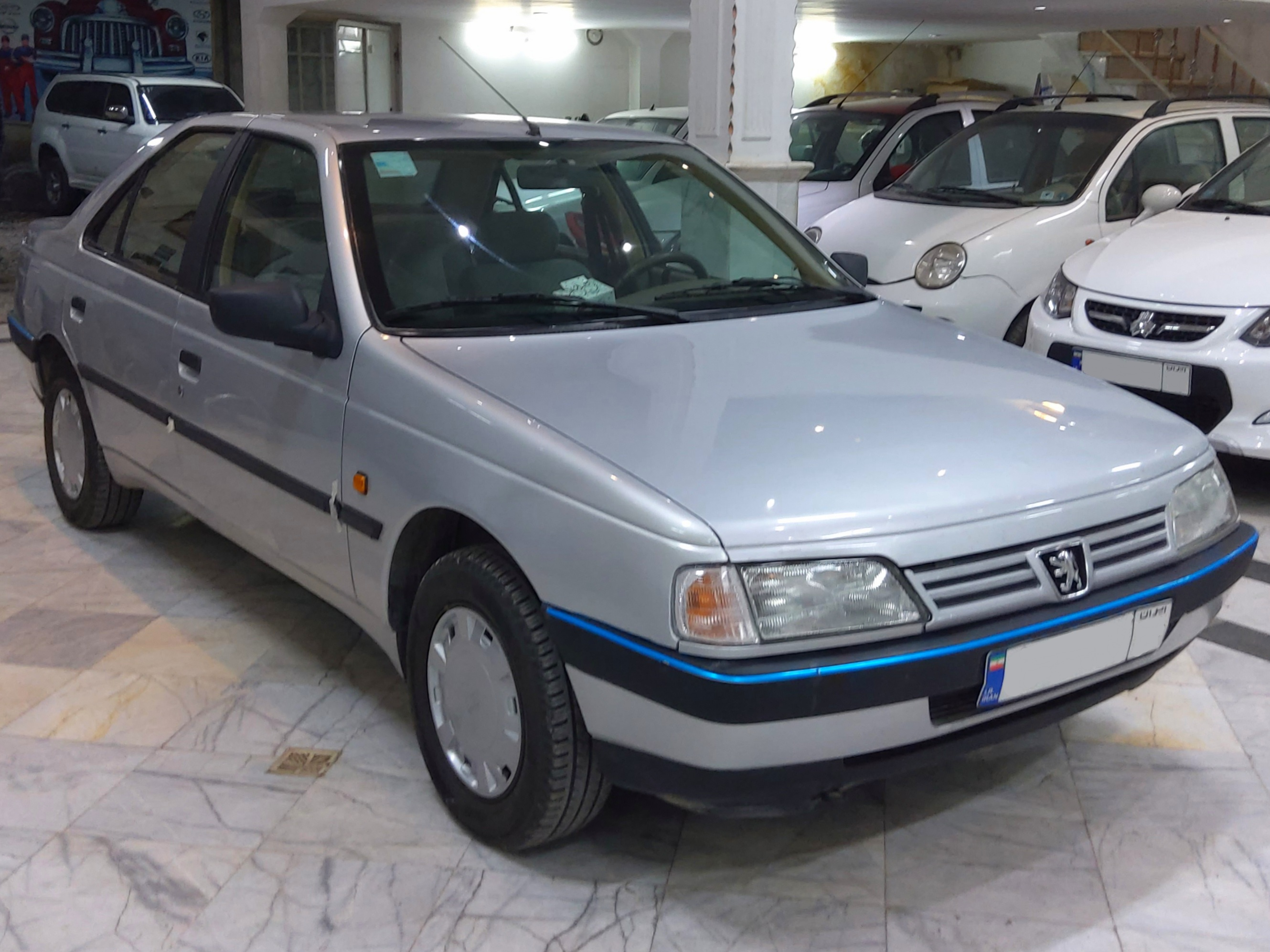
2002–2020 Peugeot 405 GLX 1.8i in Iran, with a grille featuring the post-1998 logo

Iran Khodro also produces several models derived from the 405. The Peugeot Pars, also known as the Peugeot Persia, is a facelifted 405 with a redesigned front end including clear lamp lenses and a revised rear. The Peugeot RD is a rear wheel drive car which has a 405 body and mechanical parts from the Paykan. Since 2006, it has been sold in certain markets in the Middle East as the Peugeot ROA.

The Samand, which was designed to be a "national car" for Iran, is also based on the 405 platform. It replaced the long running Paykan which was itself based on the Hillman Hunter, an ancestor (in corporate ownership and model positioning terms) of the 405, having been produced by the Rootes Group and Chrysler UK from 1963 until 1979, the year that Peugeot purchased Chrysler's European operations.

Iran Khodro, the leading Iranian car manufacturer produces the following models of Peugeot 405:

- Peugeot 405 GL/GLX with 1.6L & 1.9L 8 valve carburettor engine, this model was taken out of production in 2002.
- Peugeot 405 GLX with 1.8L 8 valve fuel injection engine and modified options, the gasoline model production stopped in 2020 And in 2022, the production of the SLX model with the TU5 engine along with Samand was stopped at the Iran Khodro factory in Tabriz.
- Peugeot 405 SLX with 1.6L 16 valve PSA TU5 engine, redesigned dashboard with two airbags, ABS brakes The production of this model was stopped in 2022
- Peugeot Pars: A modern facelift of the 405 in four models with 1.8L 8 valve, 1.9L 8 valve, 1.6L 16 valve (PSA TU5 engine) and 1.8L 16 valve engines.
- Peugeot RD and ROA: Cheaper models that use the eight-valve Hillman Avenger (Paykan) engine in the 405 body. The RD uses the original 1.6-litre version, this was upgraded to a 1.7-litre unit in the ROA. Production of these models was stopped in 2011.
- IKCO Samand, Soren, Dena And Dena Plus: Iran's National Cars which are developments using the 405 platform
- IKCO Arisun: badged under Iran Khodro's own brand, but still heavily based on the 405. It is a coupe utility which has been in production since 2015.

== Motorsport ==
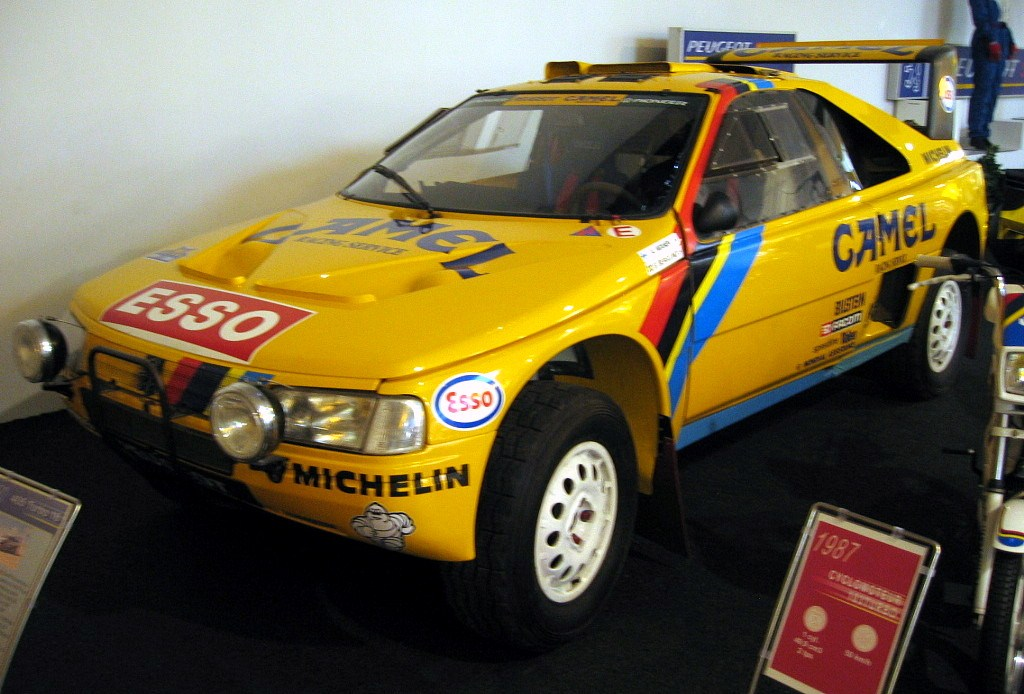
Peugeot 405 Turbo-16 winner of the Dakar Rally 1989 and 1990

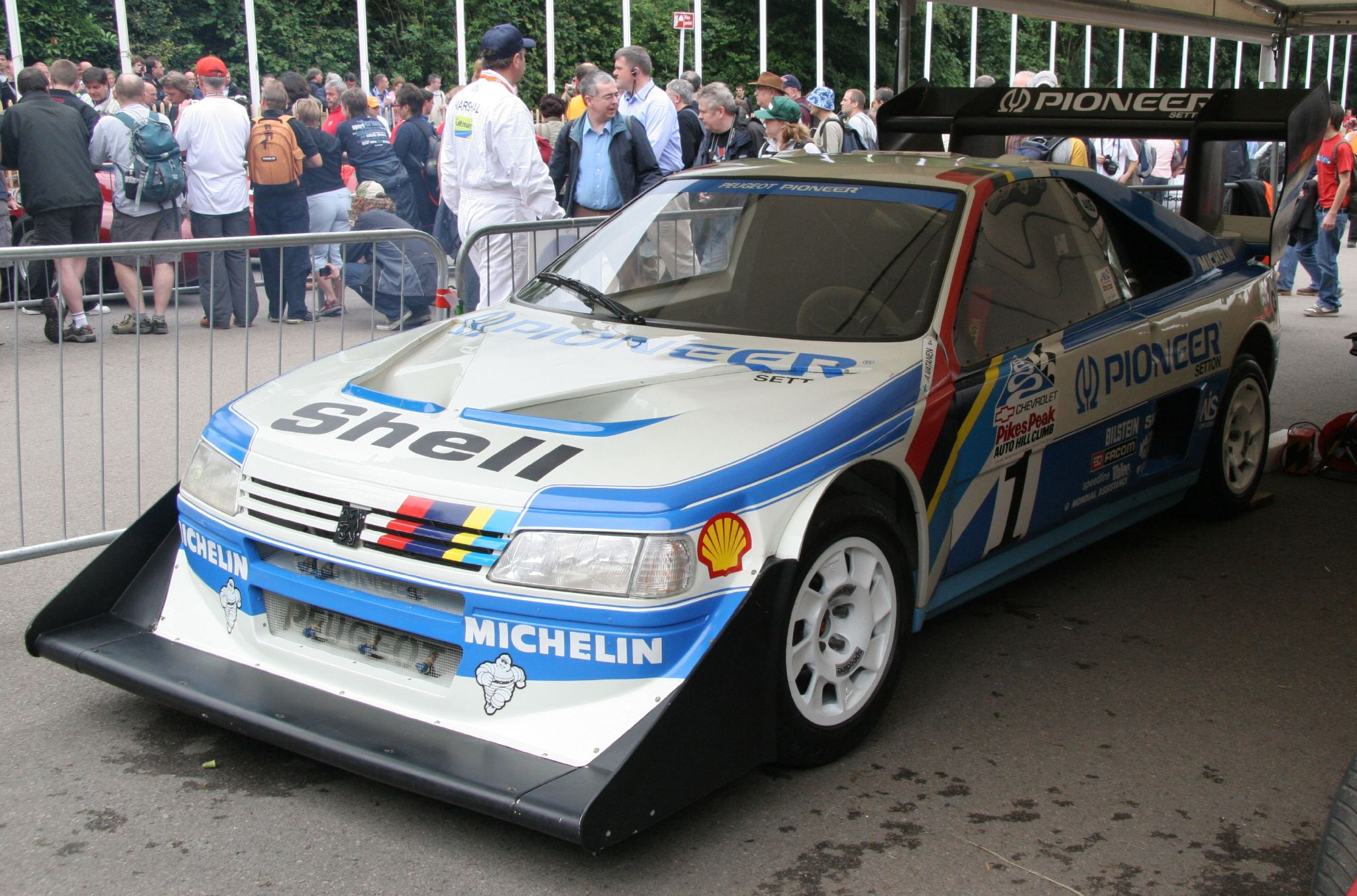
The Pikes Peak version of the 405 Turbo 16 GR.

The motorsport version of the 405, the rallying 405 Turbo 16 GR, was very different from the road going 405. It was built in a coupé body style in mid-engine configuration, had constant four wheel drive with electronically adjustable center differential like the 205 T16, as it was based on the same technology. At least four were produced, competing in hill climbs and the Paris-Dakar rally.

Today, three are in the official Peugeot museum, and the other is in a private collection.

- 1988: Finnish driver Ari Vatanen set a new record in the Pikes Peak International Hillclimb (an award-winning film of the drive titled Climb Dance was made by Jean Louis Mourey). Kankkunen and Piironen win the Paris-Dakar Rally in the 405 T16 GR.
- 1989: Victory in the Paris-Dakar rally by the Vatanen-Ickx team in a 405 T16 GR.
- 1990: Victory in the Paris-Dakar rally by the Vatanen-Berglund team in a 405 T16 GR.

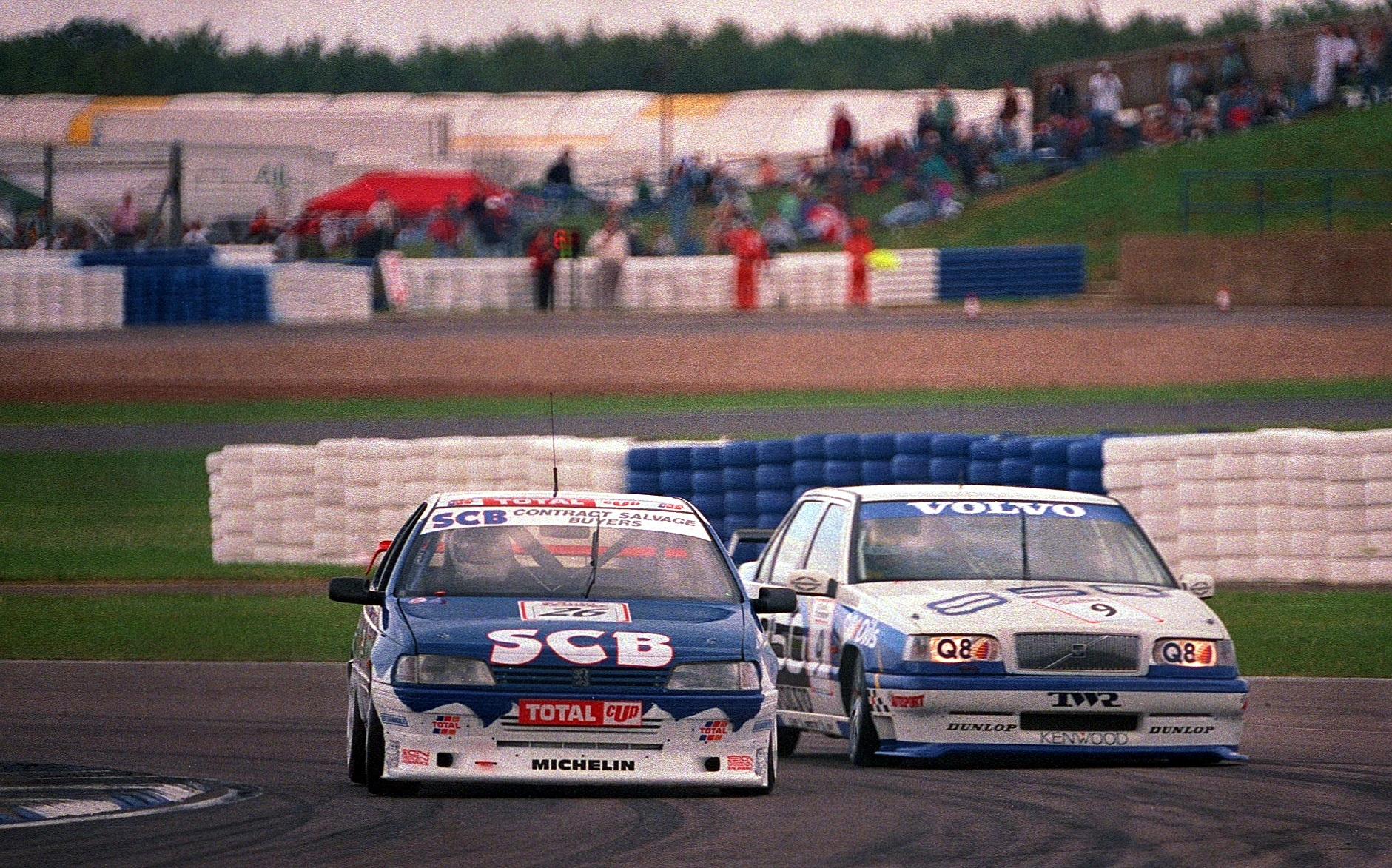
BTCC Peugeot 405 built to Super Touring regulations.

Racing 405s much closer in specification to the road going models were campaigned for several years in European touring car racing during the early to mid 1990s, most notably in the British Touring Car Championship and the French Supertourisme Championship. In Britain, the 405 did not achieve much success, but the car won the French series in both 1994 and 1995, in the hands of Laurent Aïello.

== Gallery ==
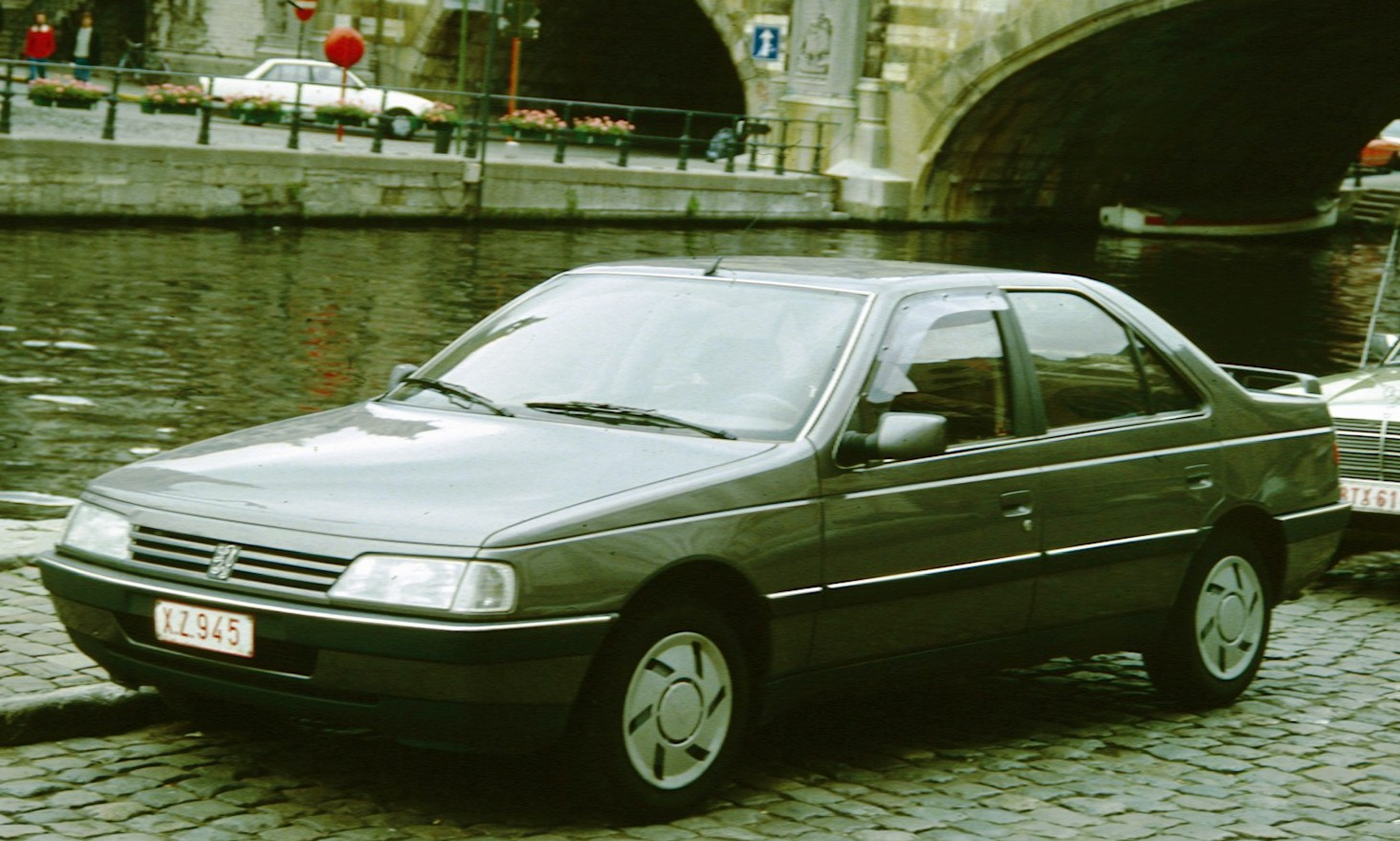
Early Peugeot 405 (Belgium)

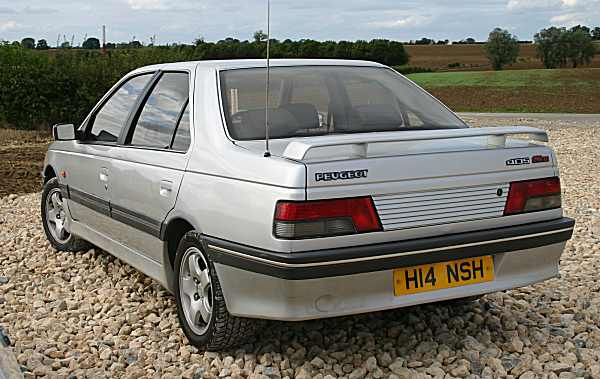
1990 Peugeot Mi16

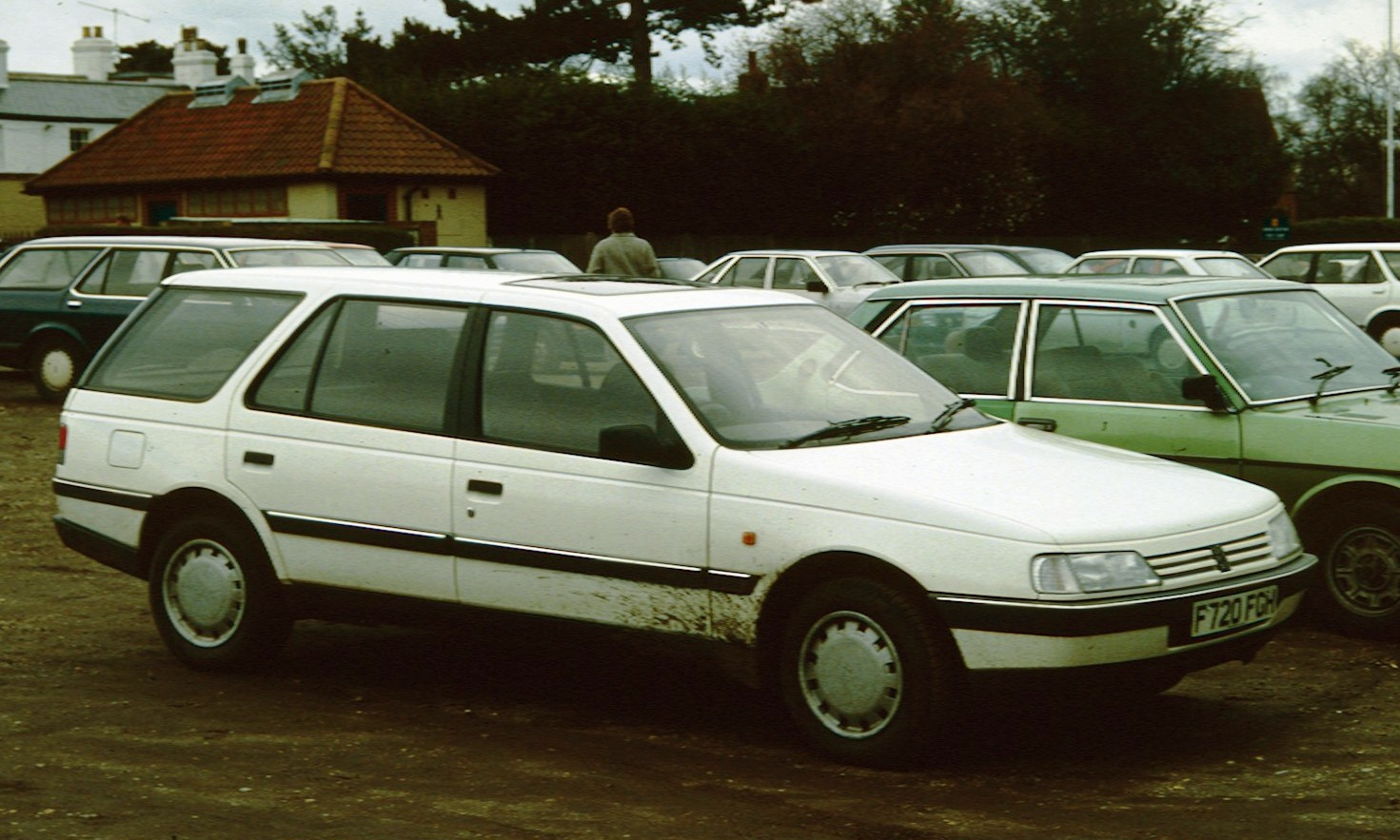
1988 Peugeot 405 Break

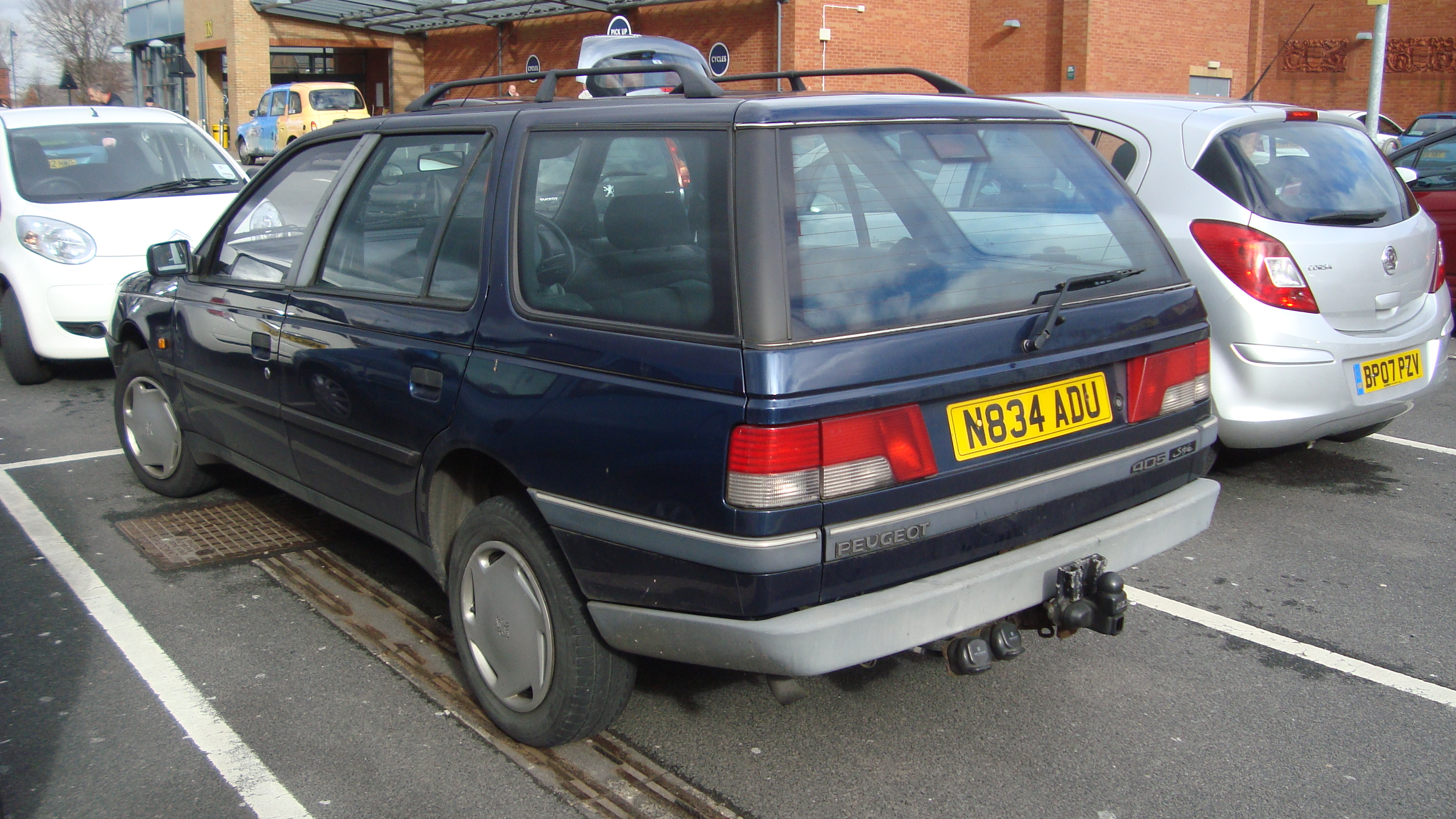
1988 Peugeot 405 Break rear

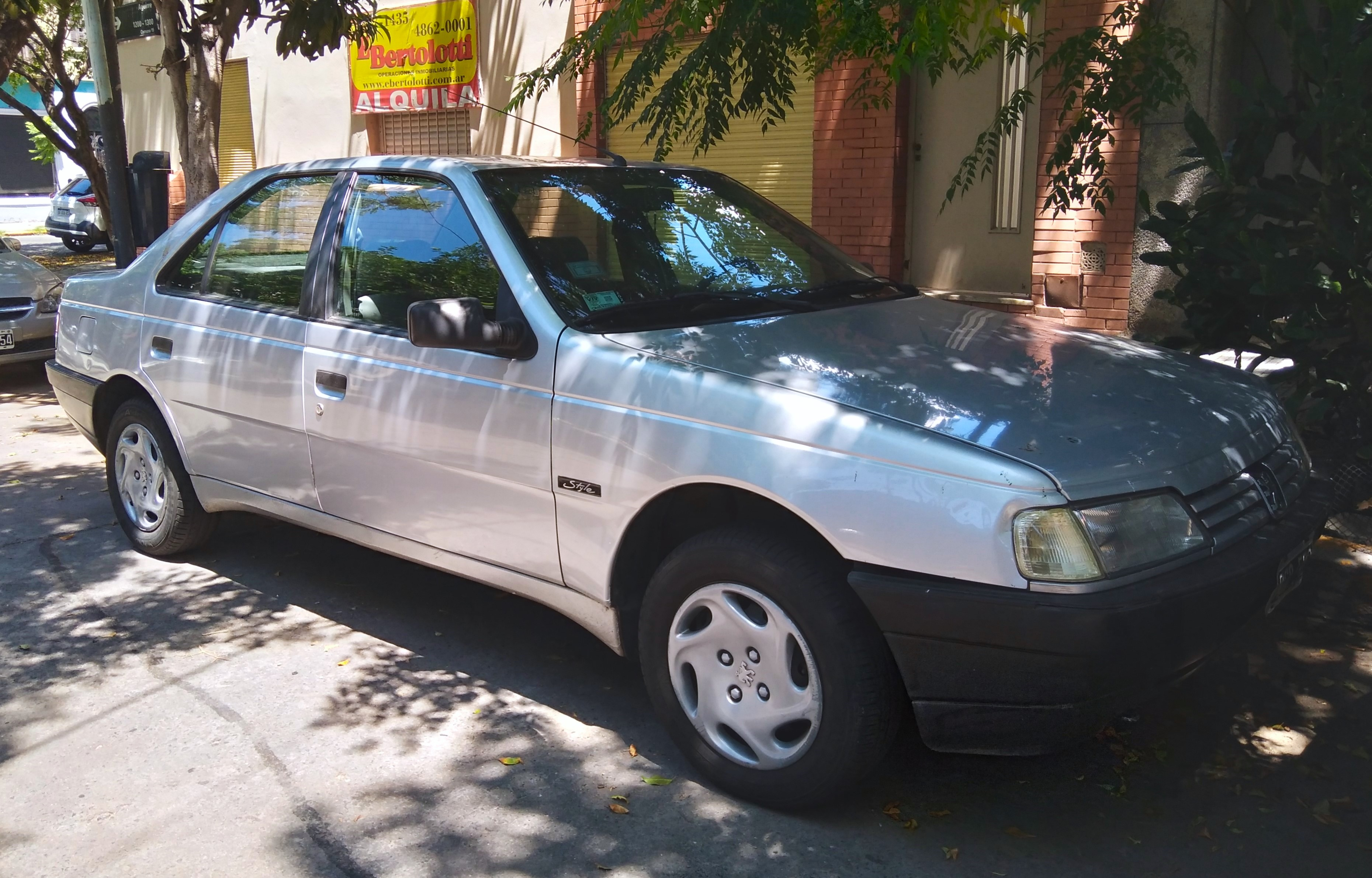
1999 Sevel-made 405 (Argentina). Note the post-1998 logo.

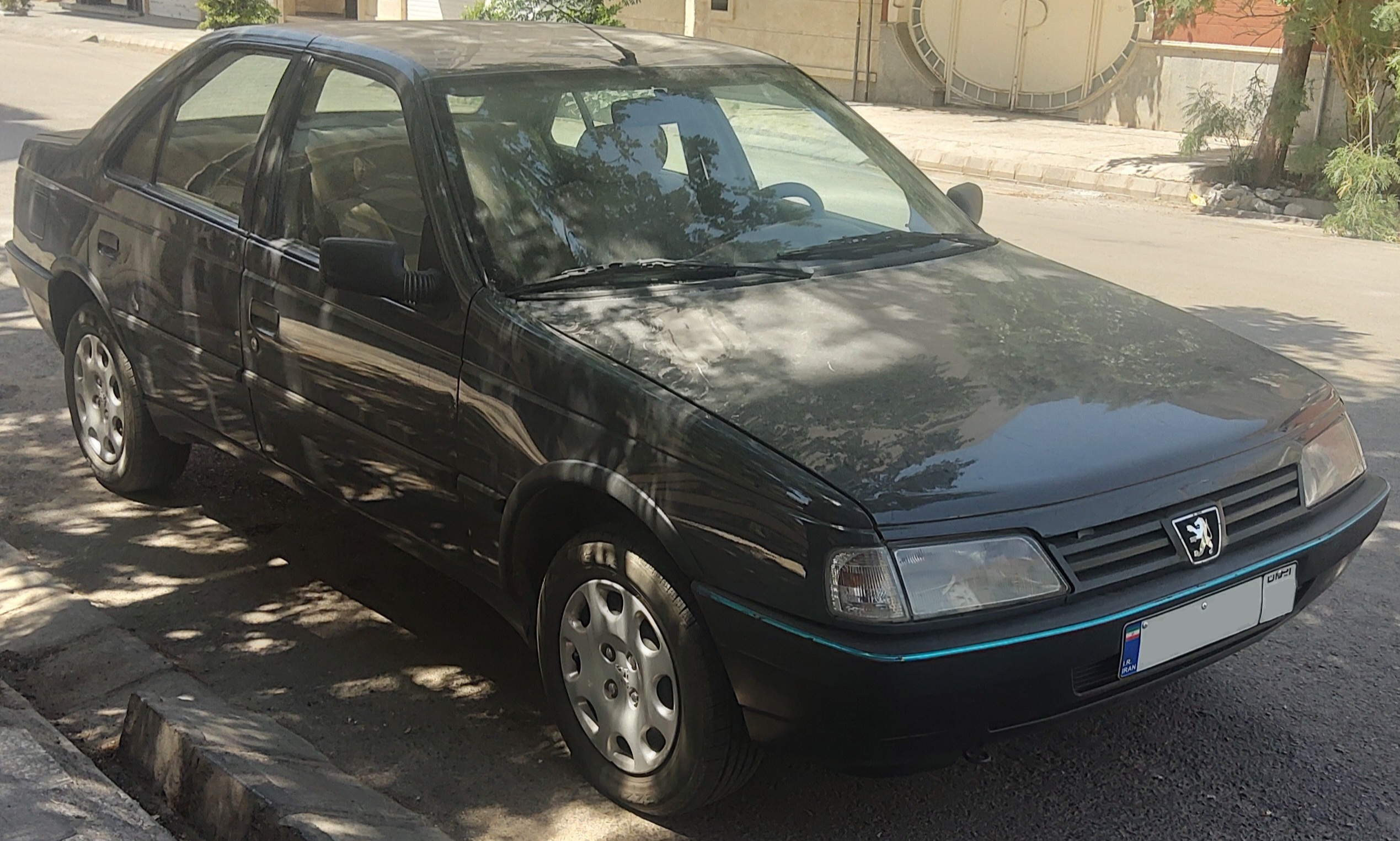
2004-2007 Peugeot 405 GLI, made by Iran Khodro.

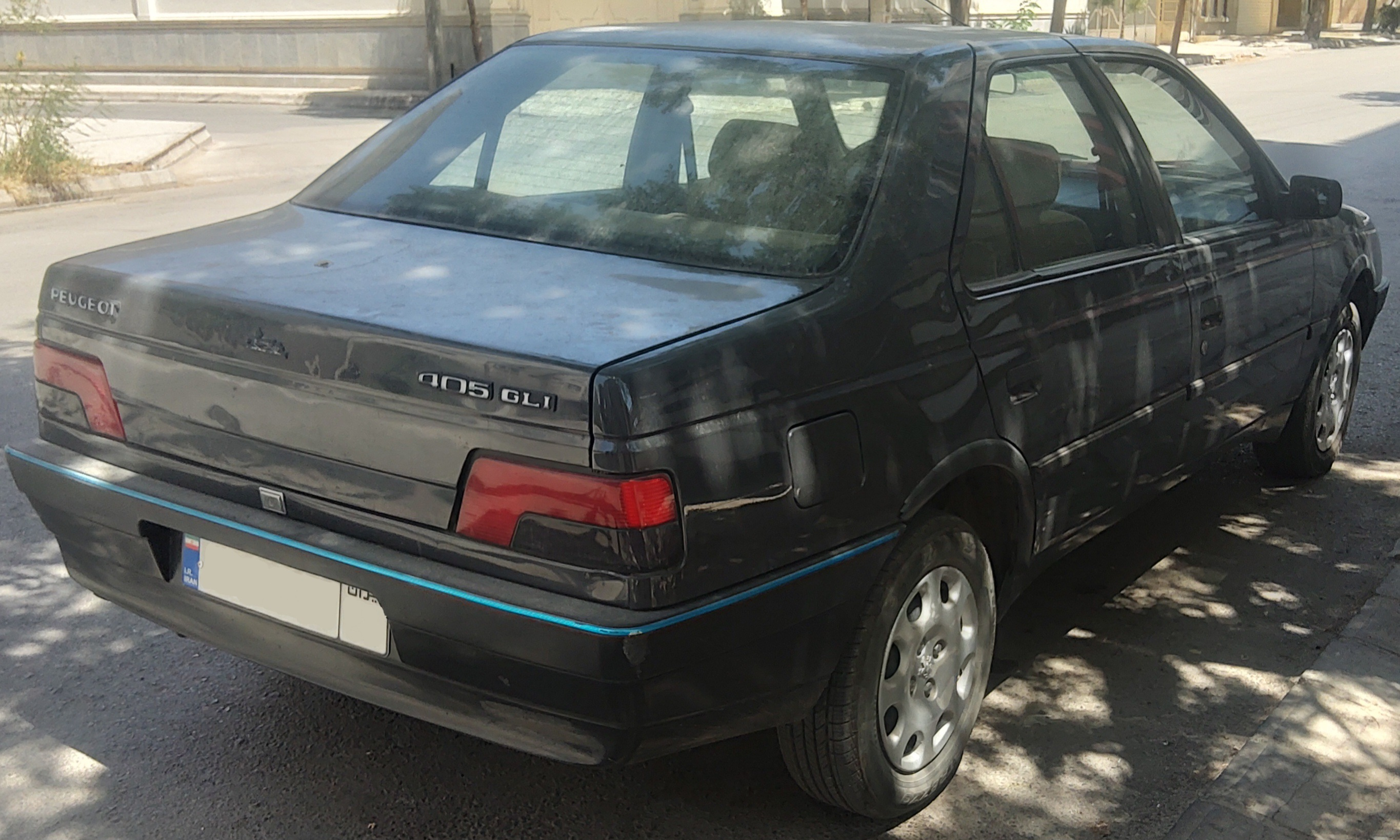
Iran Khodro Peugeot 405 GLI (rear view).

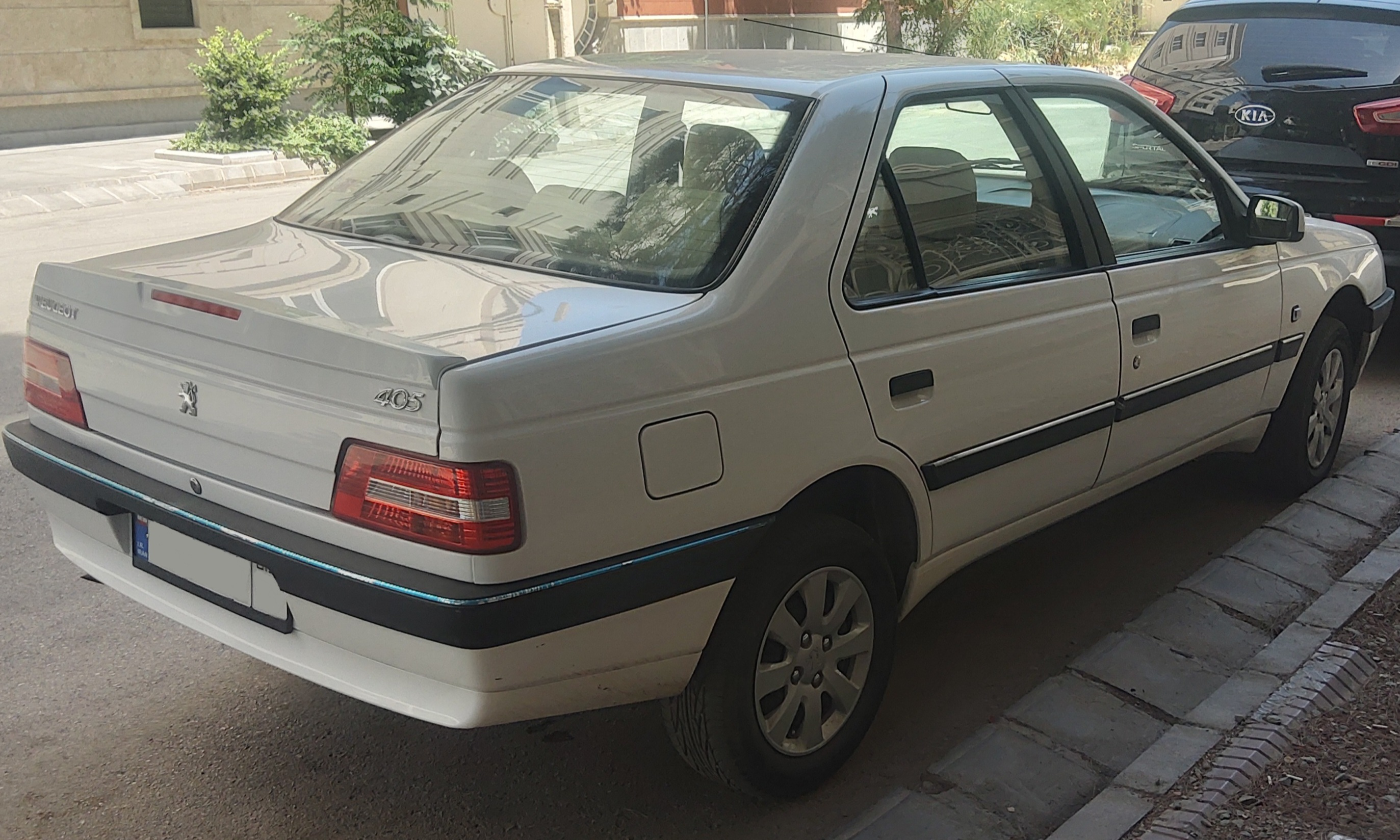
2009-2021 Peugeot 405 SLX, a very light facelift produced by Iran Khodro.

== Sales and production ==
Year	Worldwide Production	Worldwide sales	Notes
2009	220,300	234,700	
2010	302,200	299,400	
2011	282,399	270,551	Total production reaches 4,518,350 units.
2012	108,400	110,600	Total production reaches 4,626,700 units.
