= Paykan (disambiguation) =

Paykan is the Iranian-made automobile.

Paykan may also refer to:

- The Iranian missile boat Paykan
- Paykan Tehran F.C., An Iranian football club based in Tehran
