= IKCO Arisun =

Iran Khodro Arisun
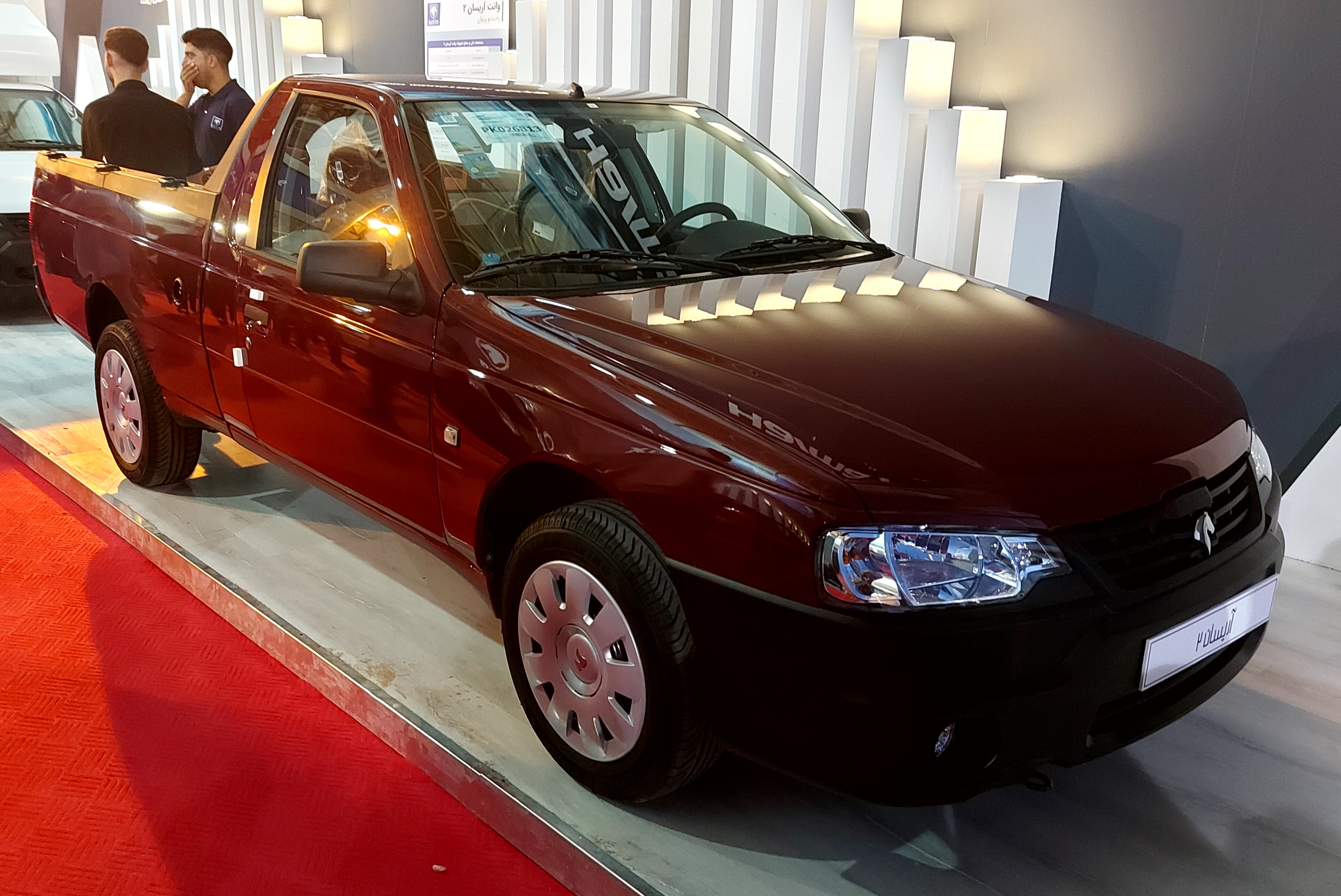
- IKCO Arisun 2

Overview
- Manufacturer: Iran Khodro
- Production: 2015–2022 (Arisun 1); 2022–present (Arisun 2)
- Assembly: Iran: Tehran

Body and chassis
- Class: coupé utility
- Body style: 2-door coupé utility
- Layout: Front-engine, rear-wheel-drive (Arisun 1); Front-engine, front-wheel-drive (Arisun 2)
- Related: Bardo; Paykan; Peugeot 405; Peugeot Pars; Peugeot ROA

Powertrain
- Engine: 1.7L 8v IKCO OHVG2 (Arisun 1); 1.8L XU7 (Arisun 2)

Dimensions
- Curb weight: 1,140 kg (2,510 lb)

Chronology
- Predecessor: Bardo

The IKCO Arisun (Persian: وانت آریسان, romanized: Vânet-e Ârisân) is a series of coupé utilities produced by Iran Khodro since 2015, based on the Peugeot 405. It costs about $7,000.

== Arisun 1 (2015–2022) ==
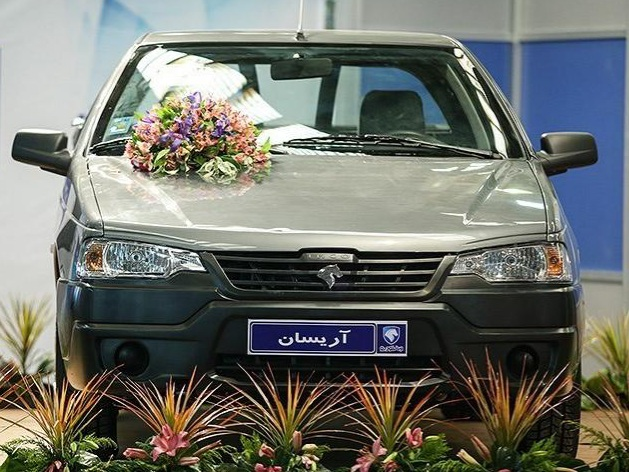
IKCO Arisun 1

The Arisun 1 was introduced in 2015, shortly after halting of the production of the Bardo (car) (The pick-up version of Paykan). It had a temporary halt in production in December 2016. It used a rear-wheel drive drivetrain.

The Arisun shared the chassis and engine with the Paykan, although its bodyshell was from the Peugeot 405, with some slight modifications.

It used the 1.7-liter IKCO OHVG2 engine, which was bi-fuel with compressed natural gas (CNG) and gasoline. On gasoline the engine produced 86 hp (64 kW) and 103 lb⋅ft (140 N⋅m), on CNG it produced 78 hp (58 kW) and 94 lb⋅ft (127 N⋅m). It had a 600 kg (1,323 lb) load capacity.

The Arisun 1 was discontinued due to Euro 5 emission standards.

== Arisun 2 (2022–present) ==
The Arisun 2 was released in 2022, more closely based on Peugeot 405. It uses the Euro 5-compliant PSA XU7 Plus gasoline engine, producing 98 hp (73 kW) and 107 lb⋅ft (145 N⋅m). It has a front-wheel drive drivetrain, and load capacity was increased to 750 kg (1,653 lb).
