= PSA XU engine =

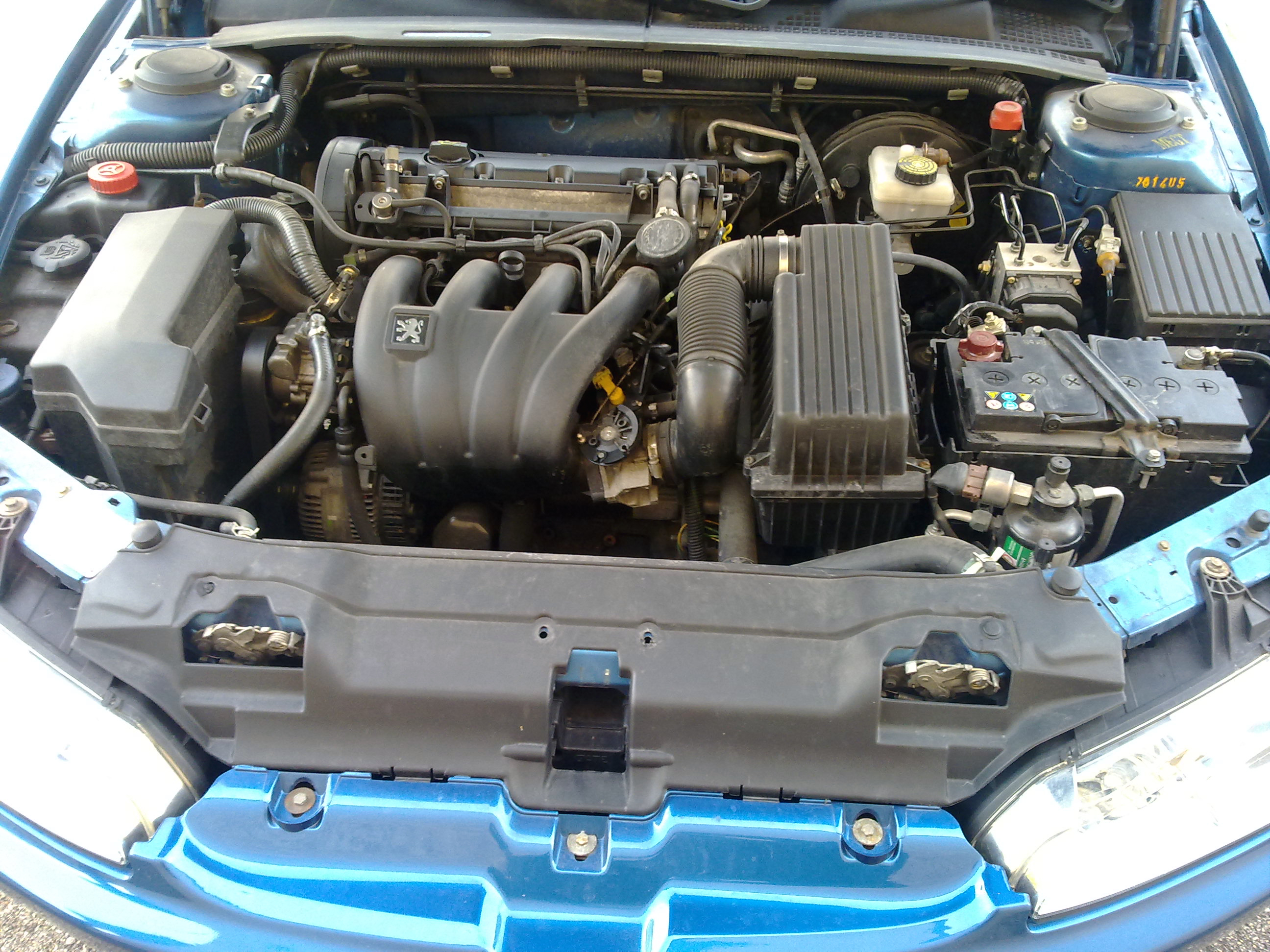

Overview
- Manufacturer: PSA
- Production: 1982–2001

Layout
- Configuration: Inline-4
- Displacement: 1.6 L (1,580 cc); 1.8 L (1,761 cc); 1.8 L (1,775 cc); 1.9 L (1,905 cc); 2.0 L (1,998 cc)
- Cylinder bore: 83 mm (3.27 in); 86 mm (3.39 in)
- Piston stroke: 73 mm (2.87 in); 81.4 mm (3.20 in); 82 mm (3.23 in); 86 mm (3.39 in); 88 mm (3.46 in)
- Cylinder block material: Cast iron, Cast aluminium alloy
- Cylinder head material: Aluminium
- Valvetrain: SOHC 2 valves x cyl. DOHC 4 valves x cyl.

Combustion
- Turbocharger: TR30R (on some versions)
- Fuel system: Single or double-barrel carburetor Fuel injection
- Fuel type: Petrol
- Cooling system: Water-cooled

Output
- Power output: 80–600 PS (59–441 kW; 79–592 hp)
- Torque output: 255–635 N⋅m (188–468 lb⋅ft)

Emissions
- Emissions control systems: Catalytic converter

Chronology
- Successor: PSA EW/DW engine

The PSA XU is a family of internal combustion engines used in Citroën and Peugeot automobiles. It became the dominant mid-size engine in Peugeot and Citroën products through the 1980s and 1990s.

The XU design was introduced in 1981 with the Peugeot 305. It was a SOHC or DOHC straight-4 design with two or four valves per cylinder, using petrol as fuel. It was applied transversely in front wheel drive vehicles only, tilted by 30°. Displacement ranged between 1.6 and 2.0 L (1,580 and 1,998 cc), and all production XU gasoline engines had a bore of 83 or 86 mm (3.27 or 3.39 in). The engine uses an aluminium cylinder head in all models. All models' blocks are made, except XU10, in cast aluminium alloy with removable cast iron wet cylinder liners. XU10 blocks are made in cast iron, with bores machined directly in the block, without removable cylinder liners. Its first Citroën application was on the Citroën BX in 1982, where it appeared in 1.6 L (1,580 cc) format.

The XU was replaced by the more modern EW/DW family.

== XU5 ==
The XU5 had a displacement of 1.6 L (1,580 cc), with a bore and a stroke of 83 mm × 73 mm (3.27 in × 2.87 in). All XU5 engines were SOHC 2-valve per cylinder designs. They used either a single or double-barrel carburetor, or fuel injection, depending on model. Output ranges from 80–115 PS (59–85 kW; 79–113 hp).

Model	Output	Notes	Model of car
XU5 J	105 PS (77 kW; 104 hp)	Fuel injection	Peugeot 205 GTi 1.6, CTi 1.6; Citroën BX16 TRi; Citroën Visa GTI
XU5 1C	80 PS (59 kW; 79 hp)	1-bbl carburettor	Peugeot 205; Peugeot 309 GR, XR, SR and SX (-->88); Citroën BX 15 RE/TGE
XU5 2C	92 PS (68 kW; 91 hp)	2-bbl carburettor	Peugeot 309 GR, XR, SR SX and XS 1.6 (89-->); Citroën BX 16 TRS; Peugeot 405 SR, GR, GRX and GL
XU5 M3/Z	89 PS (65 kW; 88 hp)	Fuel injection catalyst	Peugeot 309 GR, XR; Peugeot 405 GRi; Peugeot 205 XS, GT, Roland Garros (1993); Citroën ZX
XU5 S	94 PS (69 kW; 93 hp)	2-bbl carburettor	Peugeot 305 GT (-->85)
XU5 JA	115 PS (85 kW; 113 hp)	Fuel injection	Peugeot 205 GTi 1.6 (86-->), CTi 1.6 (-->92); Peugeot 309 1.6 SRi; Citroën Visa GTI 115ch (86-->) Citroën BX16 GTi

== XU7 ==
The XU7 had a displacement of 1.8 L (1,762 cc), with a bore and a stroke of 83 mm × 81.4 mm (3.27 in × 3.20 in). All XU7 engines used fuel injection, with a 16-valve DOHC version, the XU7 JP4, also produced. Output ranged from 90–112 PS (66–82 kW; 89–110 hp).

Model	Code	Output	Notes	Model of Car
XU7 JB	LFX	90 PS (66 kW; 89 hp)	Fuel injection catalyst	Citroën Berlingo, Citroën Xsara, Citroën Xantia from 1998; Peugeot 406 SR, Peugeot Partner
XU7 JP	LFW	99 PS (73 kW; 98 hp)	Fuel injection catalyst	Eurovans
XU7 JP	LFZ	101 PS (74 kW; 100 hp)	Fuel injection catalyst	Citroën Xantia up to 1998, Citroën Xsara, Citroën ZX; Peugeot 306, Peugeot 405, Peugeot Pars, IKCO Samand
XU7 JP4	LFY	110 PS (81 kW; 108 hp)	16-valve DOHC catalyst	Citroën Xantia, Citroën Xsara, Citroën ZX 1,8 16V; Peugeot 306, Peugeot 406, Peugeot Pars ELX, IKCO Samand Sarir
XU7P	XUP	98 PS (72 kW; 97 hp)	Fuel injection catalyst	Peugeot Pars, IKCO Arisun 2, IKCO Soren Plus

== XU8 ==
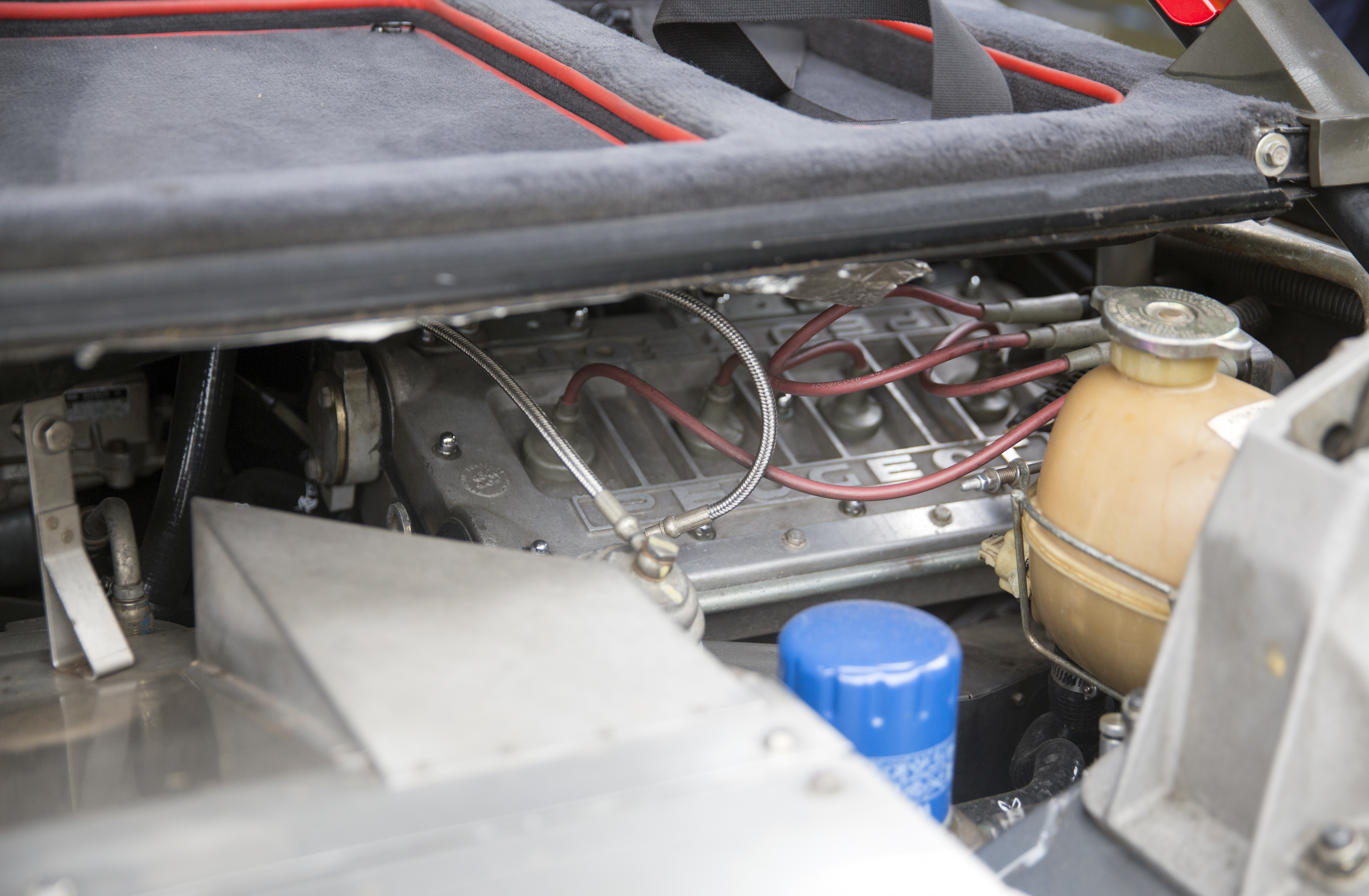
The XU8 T engine was tightly nestled into the engine bay of the 205 Turbo 16.

The XU8 had a displacement of 1.8 L (1,775 cc), with a bore and a stroke of 83 mm × 82 mm (3.27 in × 3.23 in). The only engine in this family is the 16-valve DOHC turbocharged XU8 T which was fitted to the Peugeot 205 Turbo 16.

Model	Output	Notes	Model of Car
XU8 T	200 PS (147 kW; 197 hp)	16-valve DOHC turbo	Peugeot 205 Turbo 16

== XU9 ==
The XU9 was the predecessor to the XU10 and had an aluminum block with wet iron liners. It had a displacement of 1.9 L (1,905 cc), with a bore and a stroke of 83 mm × 88 mm (3.27 in × 3.46 in). Many versions were produced, from a double-barrel carburetted 8-valve to a 16-valve DOHC fuel injected model. Output ranged from 105–160 PS (77–118 kW; 104–158 hp).

Model	Code	Output	Notes	Model of Car
XU9 S	159A / 159Z	105 PS (77 kW; 104 hp)	2-bbl carburettor	Peugeot 305 GT and GTX; Peugeot 309 1.9 GT; Citroën BX 19 GT; Citroën BX 19 TRS
XU9 2C		110 PS (81 kW; 108 hp)	2-bbl carburettor	Peugeot 405 GR, SR and GLX
XU9 4	159B	126 PS (93 kW; 124 hp)	Twin 2-bbl carburettor	Citroën BX Sport
XU9 J1	DFZ	98 PS (72 kW; 97 hp)	Fuel injection catalyst	Peugeot 305 GTX
XU9 J1/Z	DFZ	105 PS (77 kW; 104 hp)	Fuel injection catalyst	Peugeot 205 CTI, Automatic, Gentry; Peugeot 309 Automatic
XU9 M	DDZ	110 PS (81 kW; 108 hp)	Fuel injection catalyst	Peugeot 309 XS; Peugeot 405 GRi, GRiX4
XU9 J2	D6A	125 PS (92 kW; 123 hp)	Fuel injection	Peugeot 405 SRi; Citroën BX 19 GTi 8V
XU9 JA/K	D6E	130 PS (96 kW; 128 hp)	Fuel injection	Citroën ZX Volcane; Peugeot 205 1.9 GTi; Peugeot 309 1.9 GTi
XU9 JA/Z	DKZ	122 PS (90 kW; 120 hp)	Fuel injection catalyst	Peugeot 205 1.9 GTi Cat; Peugeot 309 1.9 GTi Cat
XU9 J4	D6C/L	160 PS (118 kW; 158 hp)	Fuel injection 16-valve DOHC	Citroën BX 19 GTi 16V; Peugeot 405 Mi16; Peugeot 309 GTI-16
XU9 J4/Z	DFW	148 PS (109 kW; 146 hp)	Fuel injection 16-valve DOHC catalyst	Citroën BX 16V Cat; Peugeot 405 Mi16 Cat; Peugeot 309 GTI-16 Cat

== XU10 ==
The XU10 has a cast iron block with a displacement of 2.0 L (1,998 cc), with a bore and stroke of 86 mm (3.39 in), making it a square engine. Many versions were produced, from a double-barrel carburetted 8-valve to a 16-valve DOHC, fuel injected, turbocharged model. Output ranged from 115–200 PS (85–147 kW; 113–197 hp).

Model	Code	Output (DIN)/rpm	Notes	Model of Car
XU10 2C	R2A	115 PS (85 kW; 113 hp) at 5800	8v — 2-bbl carburettor	Citroën XM 2.0; Peugeot 605 2.0
XU10 J2C/L	RFX	121 PS (89 kW; 119 hp)	8v — Fuel injection catalyst	Citroën Xantia I 2.0i Citroën ZX Volcane 2.0; Peugeot 306 XSi (-->97); Peugeot 405 SRi 2.0; Peugeot 605 (93-->)
XU10 J2	R6A	131 PS (96 kW; 129 hp)	8v — Fuel injection	Citroën Xantia I 2.0i Citroën XM 2.0 i Peugeot 605 SRi (select markets)
XU10 J2U	RFW	109 PS (80 kW; 108 hp)	8v — Fuel injection catalyst	Citroën Jumper 2.0i (-->2002); Peugeot Boxer 2.0i (-->2002); Fiat Ducato 2.0 i.e. (-->2002)
XU10 J2U	RFL	110 PS (81 kW; 108 hp)	8v — Fuel injection catalyst	Citroën Jumper 2.0i (2002-->); Peugeot Boxer 2.0i (2002-->); Fiat Ducato 2.0 i.e. (2002-->)
XU10 J2TE	RGY	141 PS (104 kW; 139 hp)	8v — turbo catalyst	Citroën XM 2.0 Turbo CT; Peugeot 605 2.0 Turbo
XU10 J2TE	RGX	147 PS (108 kW; 145 hp)	8v — turbo catalyst	Citroën XM 2.0 Turbo CT; Citroën Xantia 2.0 Turbo CT; Peugeot 406 SRi Turbo; Peugeot 605 2.0 Turbo; Eurovans
XU10 J4D/Z	RFT	150 PS (110 kW; 148 hp)	16-valve DOHC catalyst	Citroën ZX Coupé; Citroën Xantia I Peugeot 306 S16; Peugeot 405 Mi16 mkII (94-->)
XU10 J4R/L3	RFV	134 PS (99 kW; 132 hp)	16-valve DOHC catalyst	Citroën Evasion; Citroën XM (98-->); Citroën Xantia; Citroën Xsara Exclusive; Fiat Ulysse; Lancia Zeta; Peugeot 306; Peugeot 406 (-->99); Peugeot 806; Peugeot 605
XU10 J4RS/L3	RFS	166 PS (122 kW; 164 hp)	16-valve DOHC catalyst	Citroën ZX Dakar; Citroën Xsara VTS; Peugeot 306 Rallye; Peugeot 306 GTI6
XU10 J4TE	RGZ	196 PS (144 kW; 193 hp)	16-valve DOHC turbo catalyst	Peugeot 405 T16 Turbo 4x4
XU10 J4/L/Z	RFY	152 PS (112 kW; 150 hp)	16-valve DOHC catalyst	Peugeot 405 Mi16; Citroën ZX 16v Peugeot 306 S16

== Motorsport ==
The XU engine was used in motorsport for over three decades.

Model	Bore x Stroke	Displacement	Output	torque	Notes	Model of Car
*NO INFO*	83 mm × 73 mm (3.27 in × 2.87 in)	1.6 L (1,580 cc)	515 PS (379 kW; 508 hp)		16-valve DOHC turbo	Citroën AX Superproduction/ Supertourisme prototype (1988)
XU8 T	83 mm × 82 mm (3.27 in × 3.23 in)	1.8 L (1,775 cc)	200 PS (147 kW; 197 hp)		16-valve DOHC turbo	Peugeot 205 T16 Kitée
XU8 T Evo 1	83 mm × 82 mm (3.27 in × 3.23 in)	1.8 L (1,775 cc)	350 PS (257 kW; 345 hp)		16-valve DOHC turbo	Peugeot 205 T16 Evolution 1
XU8 T Evo 2	83 mm × 82 mm (3.27 in × 3.23 in)	1.8 L (1,775 cc)	550–600 PS (405–441 kW; 542–592 hp)		16-valve DOHC turbo	Peugeot 205 T16 Evolution 2
XU9J4x	83 mm × 88 mm (3.27 in × 3.46 in)	1.9 L (1,905 cc)	217 PS (160 kW; 214 hp)		16-valve DOHC	Peugeot 905 spider
XU10J4x	86 mm × 86 mm (3.39 in × 3.39 in)	2.0 L (1,998 cc)	280 PS (206 kW; 276 hp) at 8700 rpm	255 N⋅m (188 lb⋅ft) at 5900 rpm	16-valve DOHC	Peugeot 306 Maxi
XU9J4	85 mm × 88 mm (3.35 in × 3.46 in)	2.0 L (1,997 cc)	304 PS (224 kW; 300 hp) at 5250 rpm	580–635 N⋅m (428–468 lb⋅ft) at 3500–4000 rpm	16-valve DOHC TR30R turbo	Peugeot 206 WRC
XU7JP4	84 mm × 90 mm (3.31 in × 3.54 in)	2.0 L (1,998 cc)	314 PS (231 kW; 310 hp) at 5500 rpm	570 N⋅m (420 lb⋅ft) at 2750 rpm	16-valve DOHC TR30R turbo	Peugeot 307 WRC, Citroën Xsara WRC, Citroën C4 WRC

== See also ==
- PSA XUD (Diesel variant)
- List of PSA engines

== Sources ==
- Guide des moteurs Peugeot Citroën (in French)
