= Peugeot Roa =

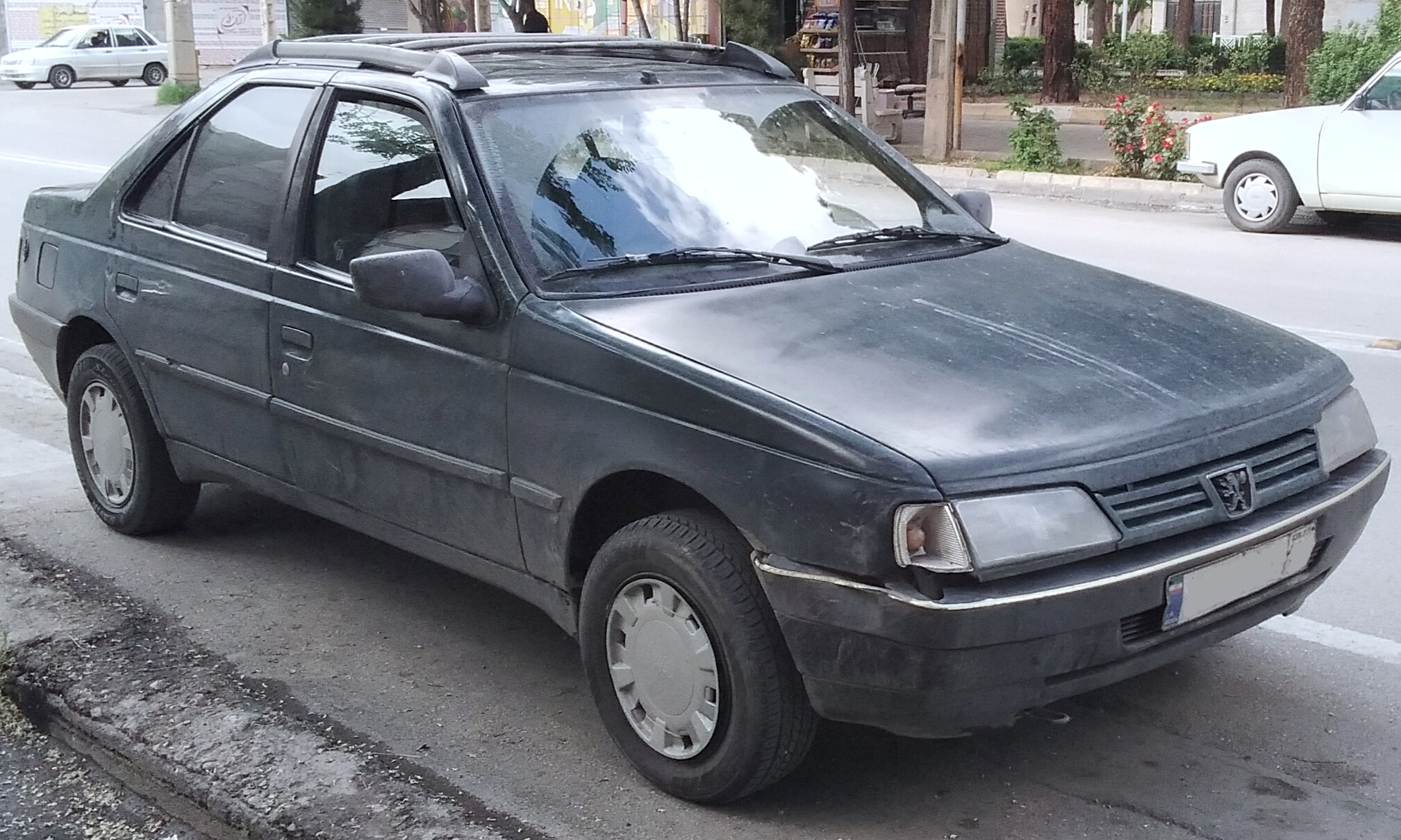
- Peugeot RD

Overview
- Manufacturer: Iran Khodro
- Also called: Peugeot RD
- Production: 1998–2006 (RD); 2006–2012 (Roa)
- Assembly: Iran: Tehran

Body and chassis
- Layout: Front engine / Rear-wheel drive
- Related: IKCO Arisun; Peugeot 405

Powertrain
- Engine: Paykan 1.6 L Hillman I4; Paykan 1.7 L Hillman I4
- Transmission: 5-speed manual

Dimensions
- Length: 4,410 mm (173.6 in)
- Width: 1,714 mm (67.5 in)
- Height: 1,408 mm (55.4 in)
- Curb weight: 1,090 kg (2,403 lb)

The Peugeot RD and Roa are a series of cars produced by Iran Khodro from 1998 to 2012. The car is a combination of Paykan and Peugeot 405. The body of Roa is a copy from Peugeot 405 and its engine and chassis are developed and modified from Iran Khodro's Paykan's chassis. Contrary to all other Peugeot 405 versions, the Roa is a rear-wheel drive car.

== Engine ==
Technically wise, The engine is the Rootes 1.6 Hillman Avenger (which were used on Paykans since late 70s) and was mated to the Hunter drivetrain and suspension.

A revised model released in 2010 known as Peugeot Roa uses 1,700 cc CNG engine. In older models, Iran Khodro used a modified version of the Paykan's 1.6-litre engine.

The engine specifications are as follows:

- Engine type: Inline-four-cylinder; four-stroke; 1,599 cc (1,697 cc)
- No. of bearings: 5
- Bore: 87.35 mm (1600-1700)
- Stroke: 66.7 mm (1600)
- Cylinder head: Aluminum
- Engine block: Cast iron
- Maximum power:
  - 1600: 61 kW (83 PS; 82 hp) at 5,000 rpm
  - 1700: 66 kW (90 PS; 89 hp) at 5,000 rpm
- Maximum torque: [135] (140) Nm at 3,000 rpm [1600cc] (1700cc)
- Compression ratio: 9.5:1 (both)
- Ignition sequence: 1-3-4-2
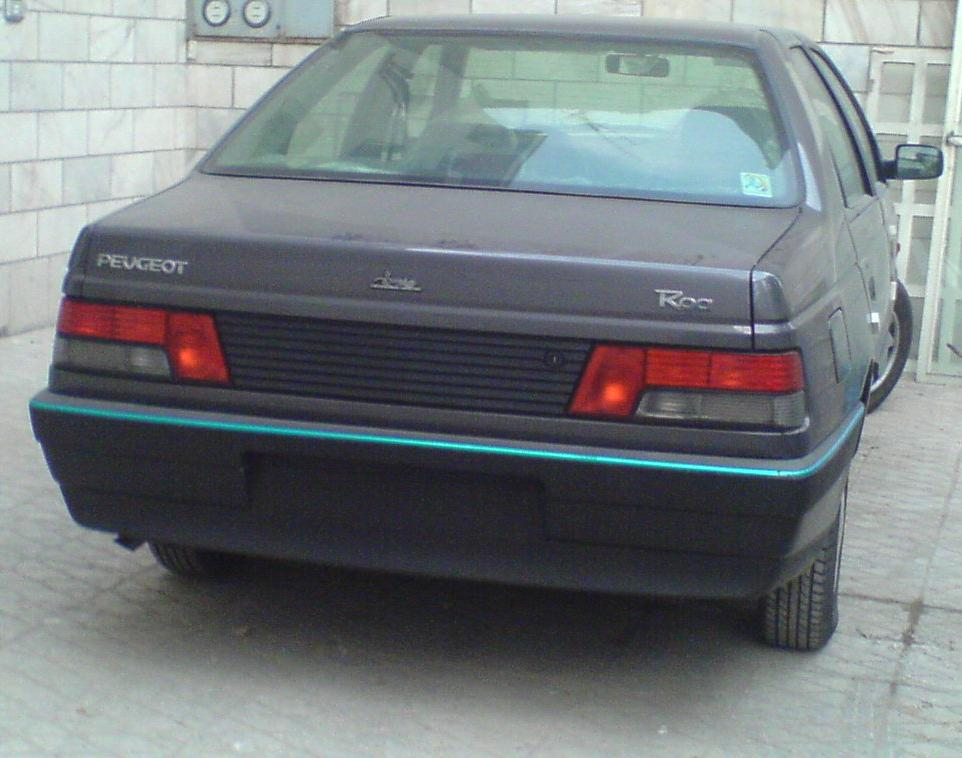
Peugeot Roa (rear view)
