= Paykan =

First Iranian-built car (1967–2014)

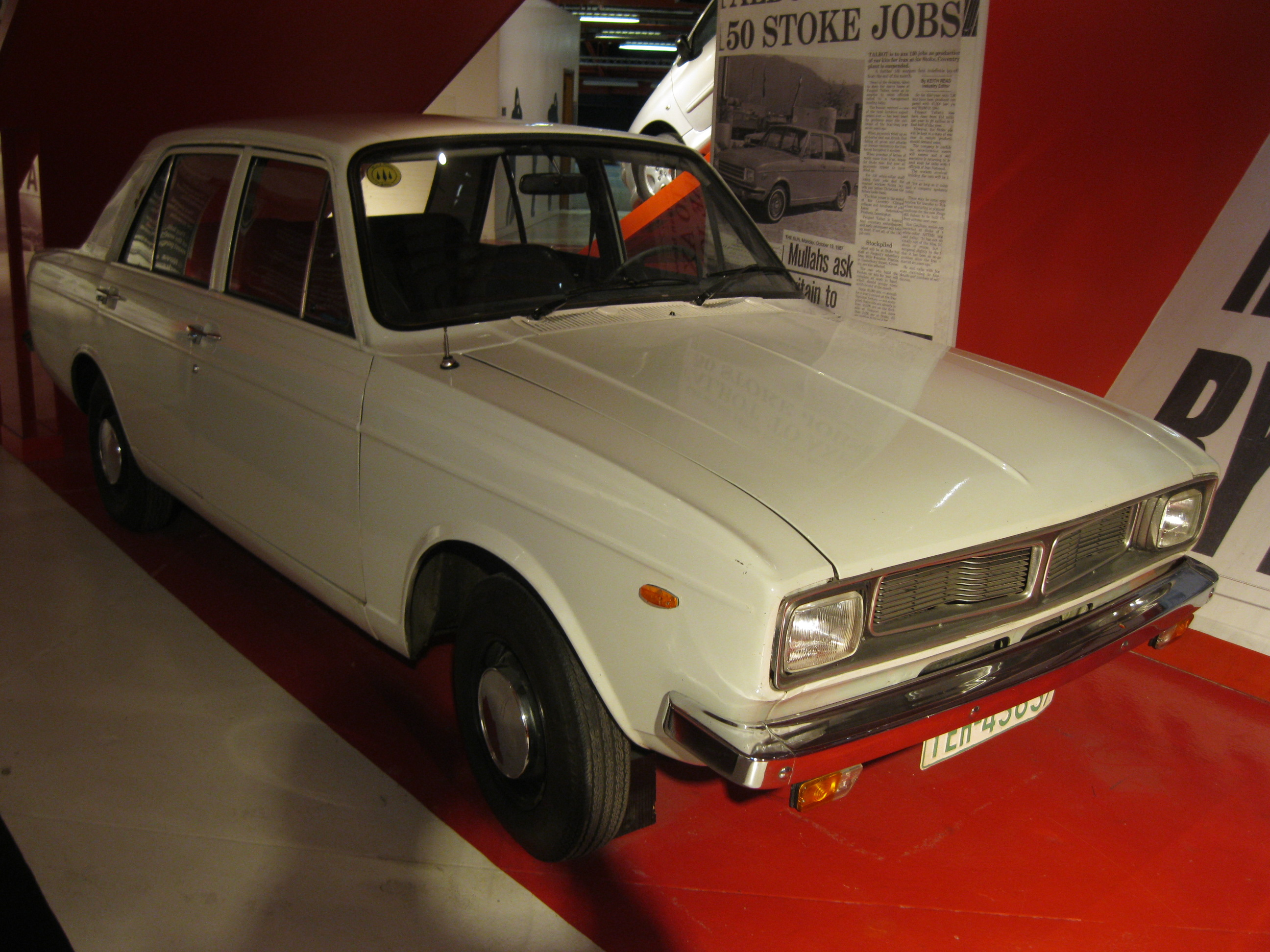

Overview
- Manufacturer: Iran Khodro
- Also called: Rootes Arrow; Hillman Hunter; Dodge Husky; Chrysler Vogue
- Production: 1967–2005 (sedan models); 1969–2014 (pickup models)
- Assembly: Iran: Tehran

Body and chassis
- Body style: 4-door saloon 5-door estate 2-door coupé utility
- Layout: Front-engine, rear-wheel-drive
- Related: Peugeot ROA

Powertrain
- Engine: 1725 cc I4 (from the Hunter); 1598 cc, 65 hp I4 (from the Avenger); 1796 cc I4 PSA XM 8-valve engine
- Transmission: 4-speed manual 3-speed automatic

Dimensions
- Wheelbase: 98 in (2,489 mm) (Saloon)
- Length: 171 in (4,343 mm) (Saloon)
- Width: 63 in (1,600 mm) (Saloon)
- Height: 56 in (1,422 mm) (Saloon)
- Curb weight: 2,100 lb (953 kg) (Saloon)

Chronology
- Successor: Peugeot ROA

The Paykan (Persian: پيکان, romanized: Peykān meaning Arrow) is the first Iranian-made car produced by Iran Khodro, between 1967 and 2005. The car, formerly called "Iran National", is a licensed version of the British Rootes Arrow (Hillman Hunter) and was very popular in Iran from its introduction until its discontinuation.

The Paykan spawned some locally developed variants, most notably a coupé utility named Bardo and having a different body shell from other the one sold elsewhere.

== History ==
The design was introduced to Iran by Mahmoud Khayami, co-founder and, by then, owner of the Iran Khodro (formerly called "Iran National") company and factory, who accurately predicted that Iran was in need of a simple "no-frills" motorcar within the price range of ordinary people.

The car itself originated in 1966 as the "Arrow" series of vehicles (the most prolific version of which was badged as the Hillman Hunter); designed and manufactured by the Rootes Group, which was the British wing of Chrysler Europe. In 1967, Rootes began exporting Hillman Hunters to Iran Khodro in "complete knock down" (CKD) kit form, for assembly in Iran. By the mid-1970s, full-scale manufacturing of the car (minus the engine) had started in Iran.

In 1977, Roy Axe designed a new Paykan facelift model using many interior and exterior parts from the Chrysler Alpine.

In 1978, PSA Peugeot Citroën purchased the ailing Chrysler Europe after Chrysler exited the European market; and with it acquired the rights to the Hillman Hunter/Arrow design. A year later, Peugeot ended Hillman Hunter production in Ireland. Following this, the Paykan's engine production tooling was moved to Iran and was in full-scale manufacturing under Peugeot licence. This ended in 2005 with the final Paykan leaving the assembly line.

Iran Khodro tried to replace Paykan with a so-called "New Paykan" but Peugeot did not agree with the naming. This revealed the fact that the intellectual ownership of the Paykan brand and logo still belongs to PSA Peugeot Citroën, as a legacy of Rootes Group.

== Design ==
Although the Paykan was based on a 1966 Hillman Hunter, there were many changes and modifications made to it over the years – notably the substitution of the original 1725cc Rootes engine with a Peugeot 504-derived unit. The modifications to the exterior included revised headlights and taillights. A Paykan Pickup was also offered. There was another pickup truck based on the Hillman Hunter sold in South Africa – the Dodge Husky – but the two models used different bodies. The South African version has a thicker B-pillar and retains the saloon's lines along the side panels. The tailgate and rear window are also subtly different.

The Iranian government reportedly offered Iran Khodro a large cash incentive to end Paykan production by 2005, labelling the car as an environmental hazard because of its unacceptably high fuel consumption. During its last years, the order backlog was nearly two years long.

The Samand, commonly referred to as the "New Paykan", is currently being produced by Iran Khodro as a modern substitute for the Paykan class of cars. In 2005, Iran Khodro announced that it had sold the discontinued Paykan's motorcar production line to the Khartoum Transport Company in Sudan, while car-parts production for the Paykan still continues by third-party manufacturers in Iran.

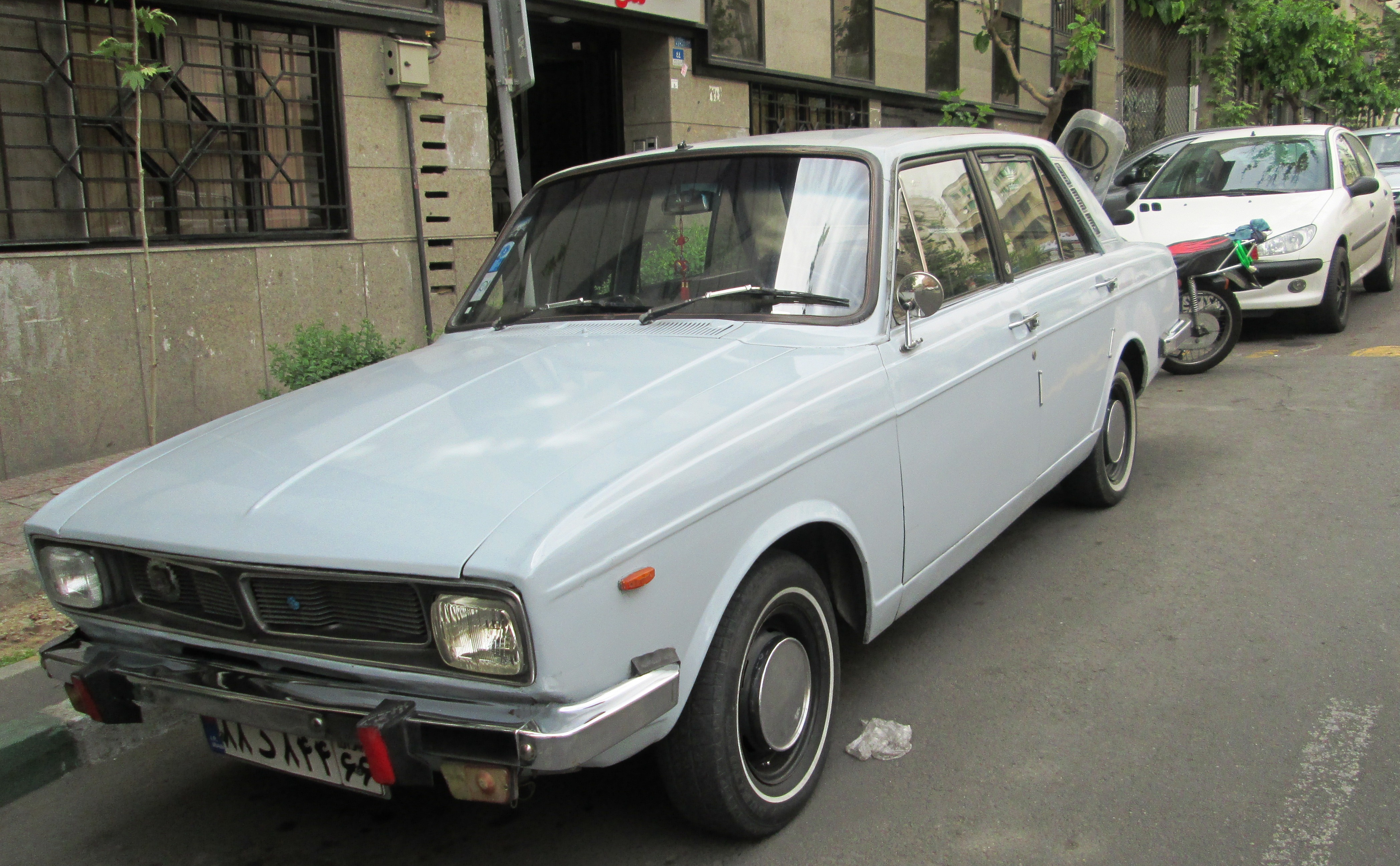
A 1960s Paykan seen in Tehran.

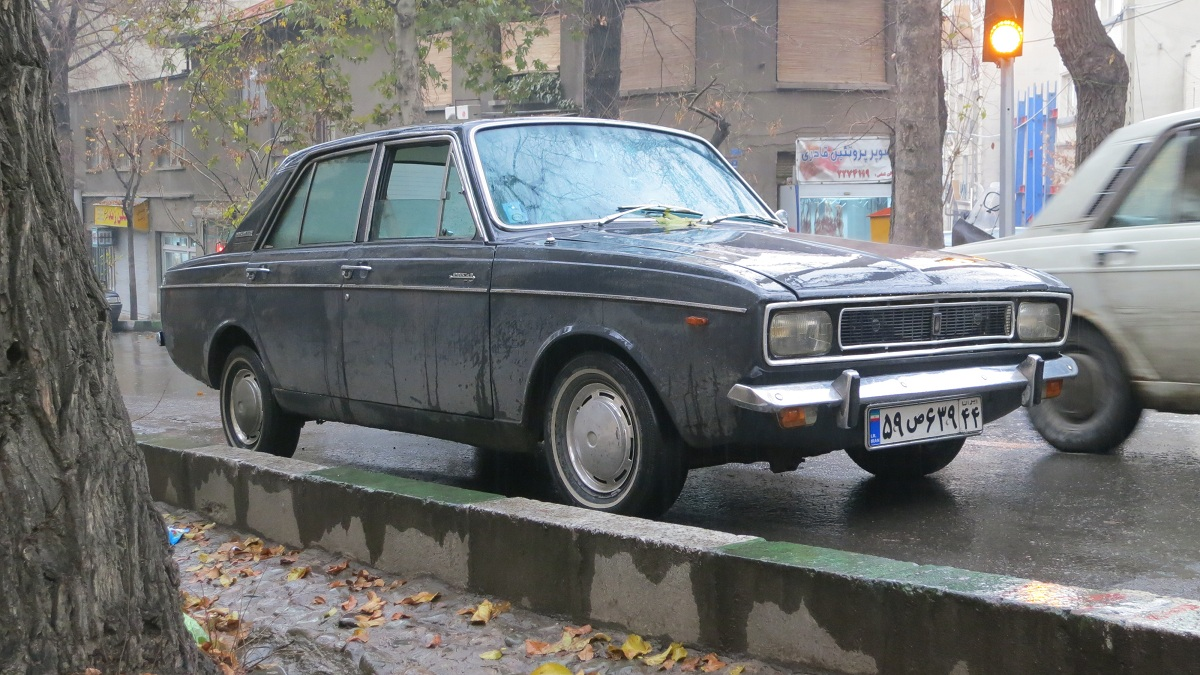
A 1971 Paykan DeLuxe.

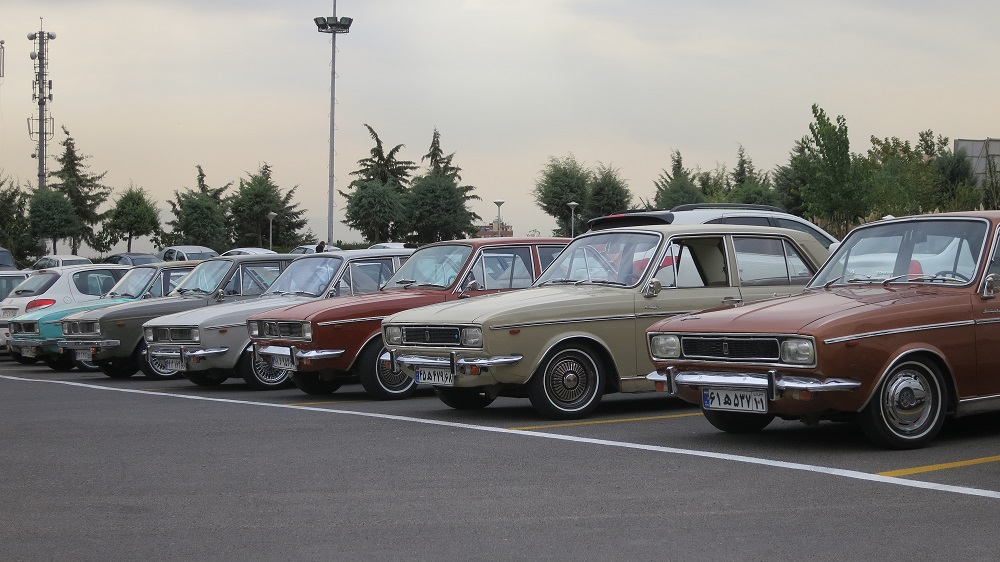
A Paykan gathering in Northern Tehran.

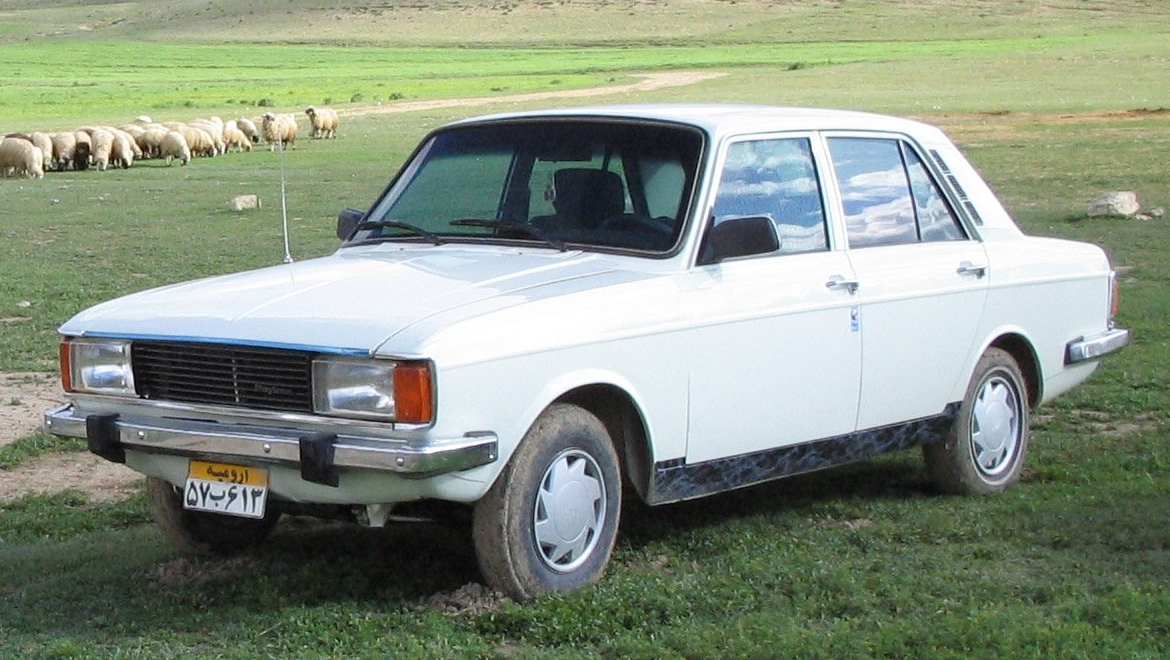
1985 Paykan Saloon

== Bardo ==
Bardo
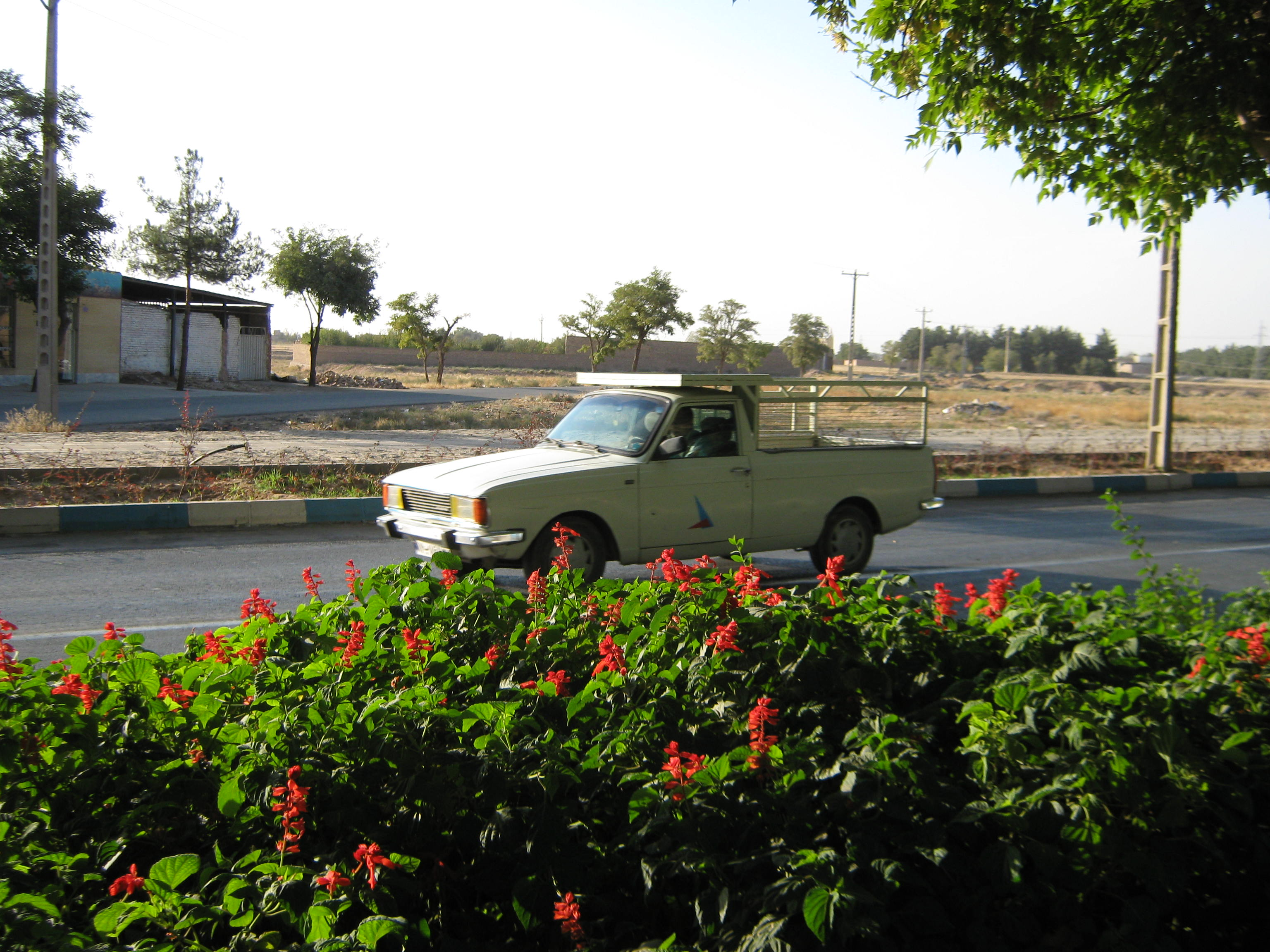

Overview
- Manufacturer: IKCO
- Also called: Paykan Pickup
- Production: 1969–2014
- Assembly: Iran: Tehran

Body and chassis
- Class: coupé utility
- Body style: 2-door coupé utility
- Layout: Front engine rear wheel drive
- Related: Paykan; IKCO Arisun

Powertrain
- Engine: 1.6 L (OHV) I4 (80 hp); 1.7 L (OHV II) I4 (86 hp)
- Transmission: 4-speed manual

Dimensions
- Wheelbase: 2,502 mm (98.5 in)
- Length: 4,322 mm (170.2 in)
- Width: 1,620 mm (64 in)
- Height: 1,422 mm (56.0 in)
- Curb weight: 960 kg (2,120 lb)

The Bardo is a coupé utility produced by Iran Khodro from 1969 to 2014, based on the Paykan.

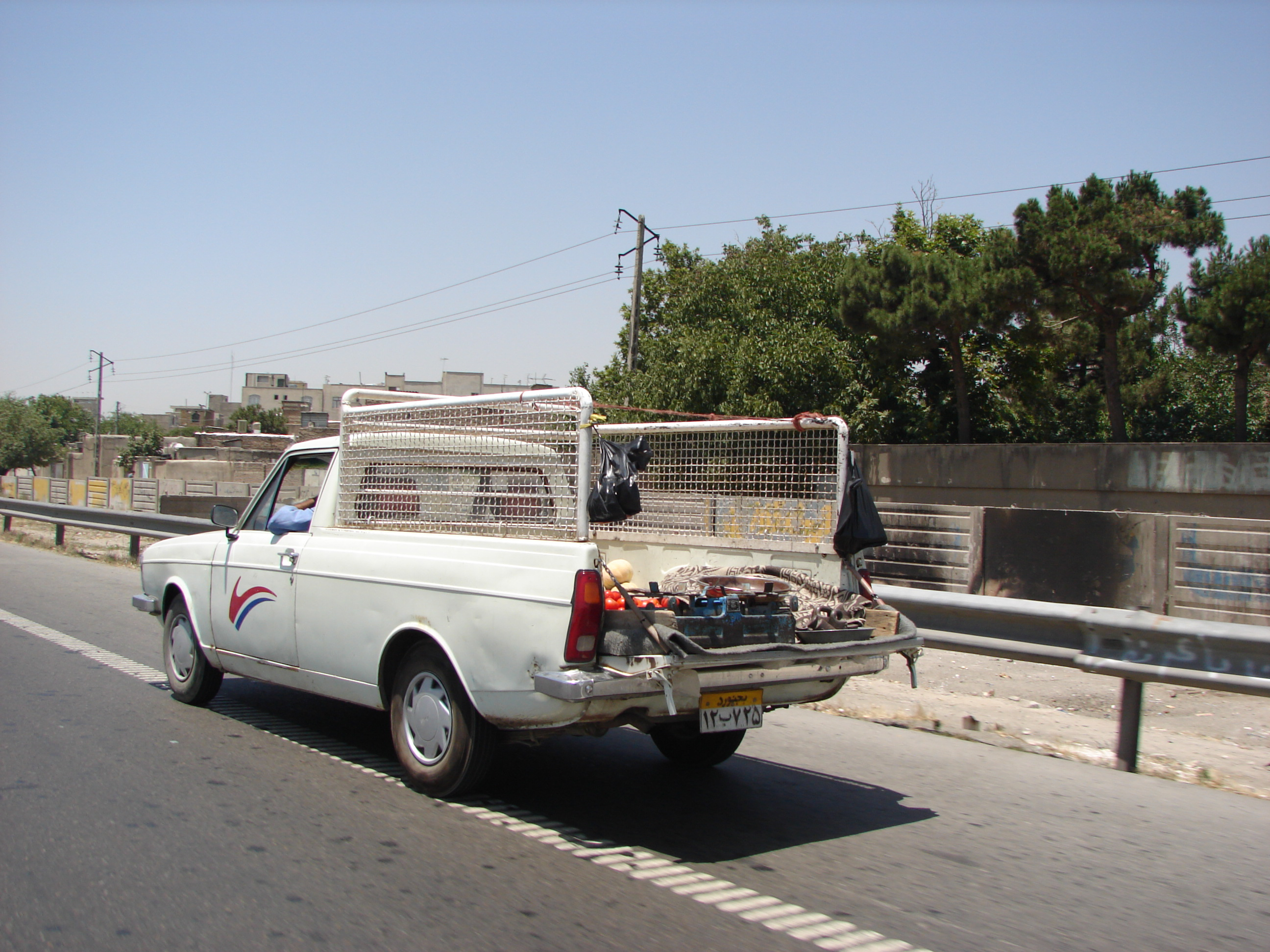
Rear view

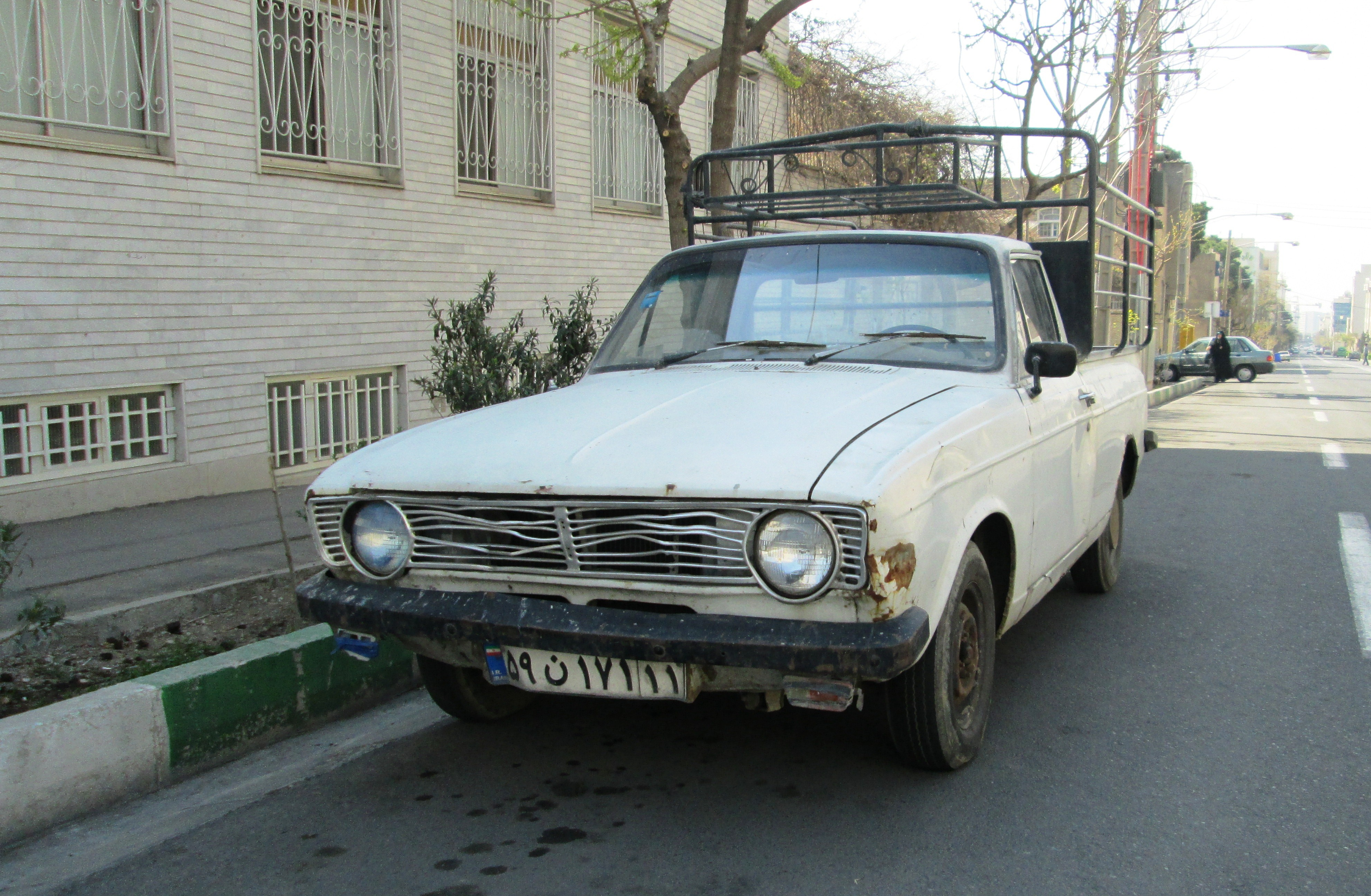
Paykan Pickup

== See also ==
- Automotive industry in Iran
