= Rambler American =

Compact car produced by American Motors Corporation

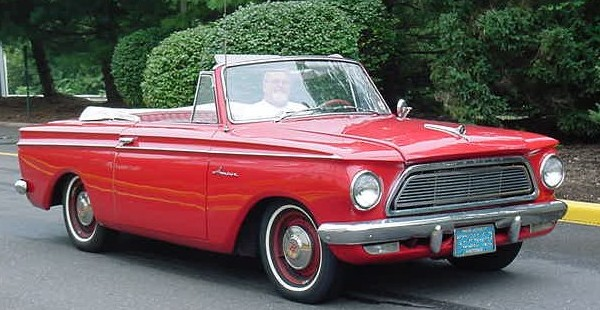
- Second generation: 1962 convertible

Overview
- Manufacturer: American Motors Corporation (AMC)
- Production: 1958–1969
- Assembly: United States: Kenosha, Wisconsin (Kenosha Engine); Australia: Port Melbourne (AMI); Canada: Brampton, Ontario; Iran: Tehran (Pars Khodro); Mexico: Mexico City (VAM); South Africa: Pretoria

Body and chassis
- Class: Compact
- Layout: FR layout
- Platform: AMC's "junior cars"

Chronology
- Predecessor: Nash Rambler; Nash Metropolitan
- Successor: AMC Hornet

The Rambler American is a compact car produced by American Motors Corporation (AMC) from 1958 until 1969. Representing the second incarnation of the influential compact Rambler lineage that originated with AMC's forerunner, Nash Motors, in 1950. This version continued to be marketed under the Nash and Hudson marques during the 1954 and 1955 model years following the merger of the two automakers in 1954.

The Rambler American spanned three generations: 1958–1960, 1961–1963, and 1964–1969. Its final model year, 1969, was the last automobile to carry the historic Rambler name in the U.S. and Canadian markets. The Rambler American was also marketed or assembled under license in Australia, Iran, Mexico, Argentina, and South Africa. The Rambler American was available in right-hand drive versions. AMC also shipped CKD units to be assembled in other countries.

The compact Rambler American was among the lowest-priced cars built in the U.S. which earned popularity for its low cost of ownership. Numerous victories in the Mobil Economy Run competitions validated this reputation. While initially lauded for its practicality, the American's image expanded with the optional second-generation AMC V8 engine in late 1966. This transformation made them compact "muscle" models, culminating in the 390 cu in (6.4 L) version developed with Hurst Performance, marketed as the "SC/Rambler".

The Rambler American platform also served as the foundation for other designs. A youth-oriented concept car, the 1964 Rambler Tarpon, showcased a fastback design that foreshadowed the styling of the 1965 Rambler Marlin. The platform transitioned to sporty pony cars with the 1968 AMC Javelin. It was further reconfigured for its replacement model, the 1970 AMC Hornet. The Rambler American exemplifies AMC's strategic agility, blending economy, innovation, and performance.

== Development ==
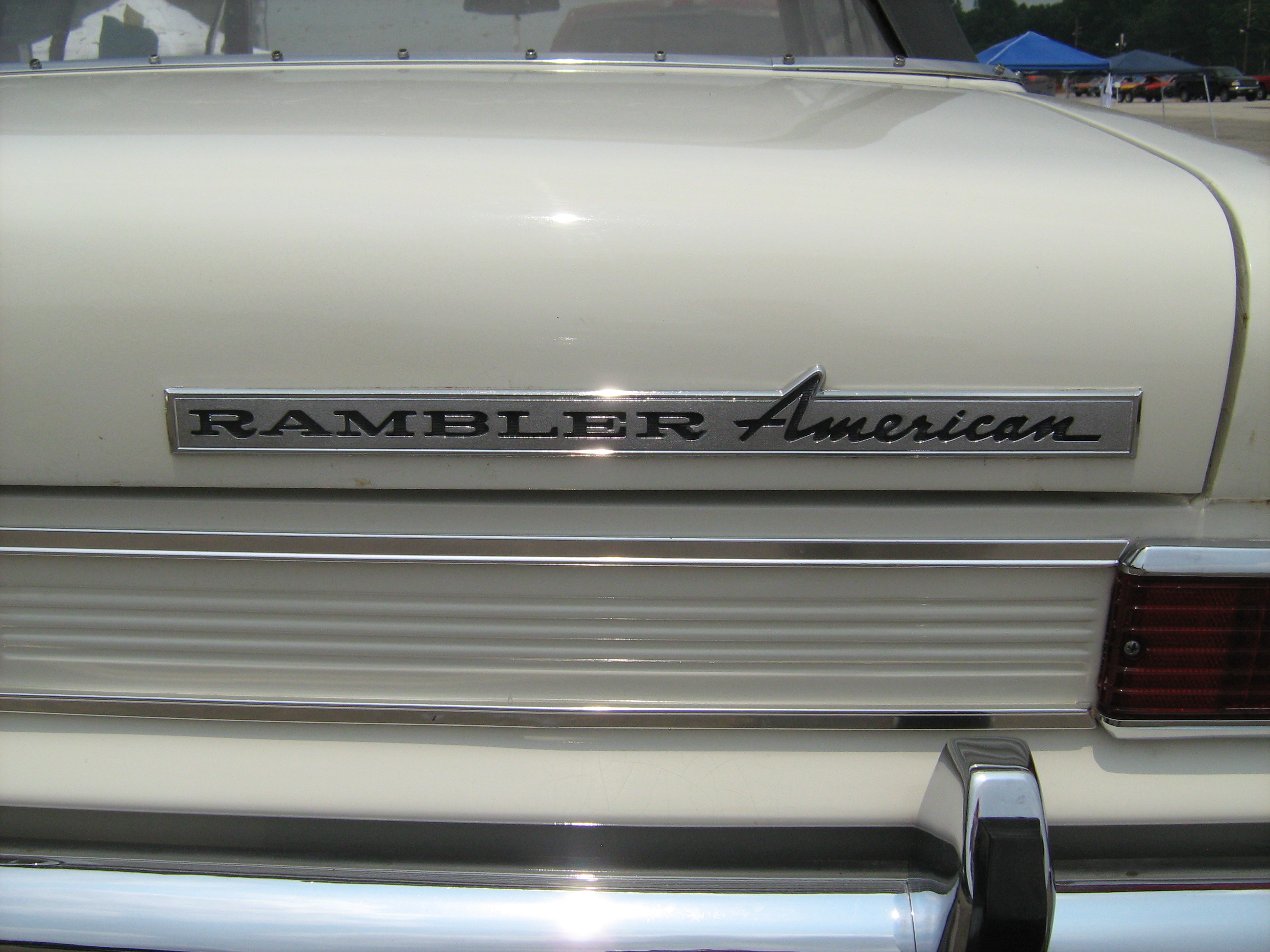
Rambler American badge

The genesis of the Rambler American began with the Nash Rambler, introduced in 1950. AMC President George Mason believed in small cars and introduced the Austin-built, Nash-designed Metropolitan in 1954. The Rambler line grew to a larger size (108-inch (2,743 mm) wheelbase) in 1956. With costs to produce the Metropolitan rising, AMC decided to reintroduce a modified version of the 1955 Nash Rambler (the previous 100 in (2,540 mm) wheelbase model). The domestically produced small car let AMC control costs more closely. The new president of AMC, George W. Romney, also wanted to build momentum in challenging the domestic Big Three automakers by adding a third car line. The introduction of the low-priced small Rambler was ideal as the nation entered into a recession in 1958.)

The first proposals were to modify AMC's captive import by extending the Metropolitan with a station wagon-type roof design to make room for four passengers. The 85-inch (2,159 mm) wheelbase of the Metropolitan, though, severely limited the necessary interior room, and costs of the overseas-built model were harder to control. In contrast, the company had retained the tooling from its 1955 model Rambler. The old model's 100-inch (2,540 mm) wheelbase fit between its bigger family-sized 108-inch (2,743 mm) wheelbase Ramblers and the small import. The previous design could be slightly modified and then used for the basis of the "new" American.

American Motors' financial condition meant it could not afford to develop an entirely new model. The reintroduction of the old model leveraged Rambler's renown for fuel economy and wins in the Mobil Economy Runs, with the consumer's need for a smaller and more efficient alternative to the standard-sized cars that were marketed by the domestic Big Three at that time.

== First generation ==
First generation
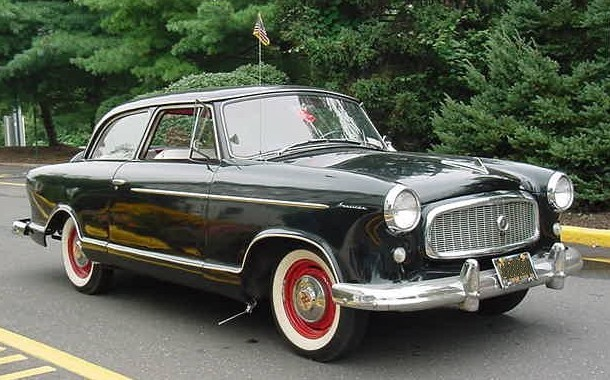
- 1959 Rambler American 2-Door Club Sedan

Overview
- Production: 1958–1960

Body and chassis
- Body style: 2-door sedan; 2-door station wagon; 4-door sedan; 2-door sedan delivery

Powertrain
- Engine: 195.6 cu in (3.2 L) I6

Dimensions
- Wheelbase: 100 in (2,540 mm)
- Length: 178.25 in (4,528 mm)
- Width: 73 in (1,854 mm)
- Height: 57.32 in (1,456 mm)
- Curb weight: 2,439–2,554 lb (1,106–1,158 kg)

=== 1958 ===
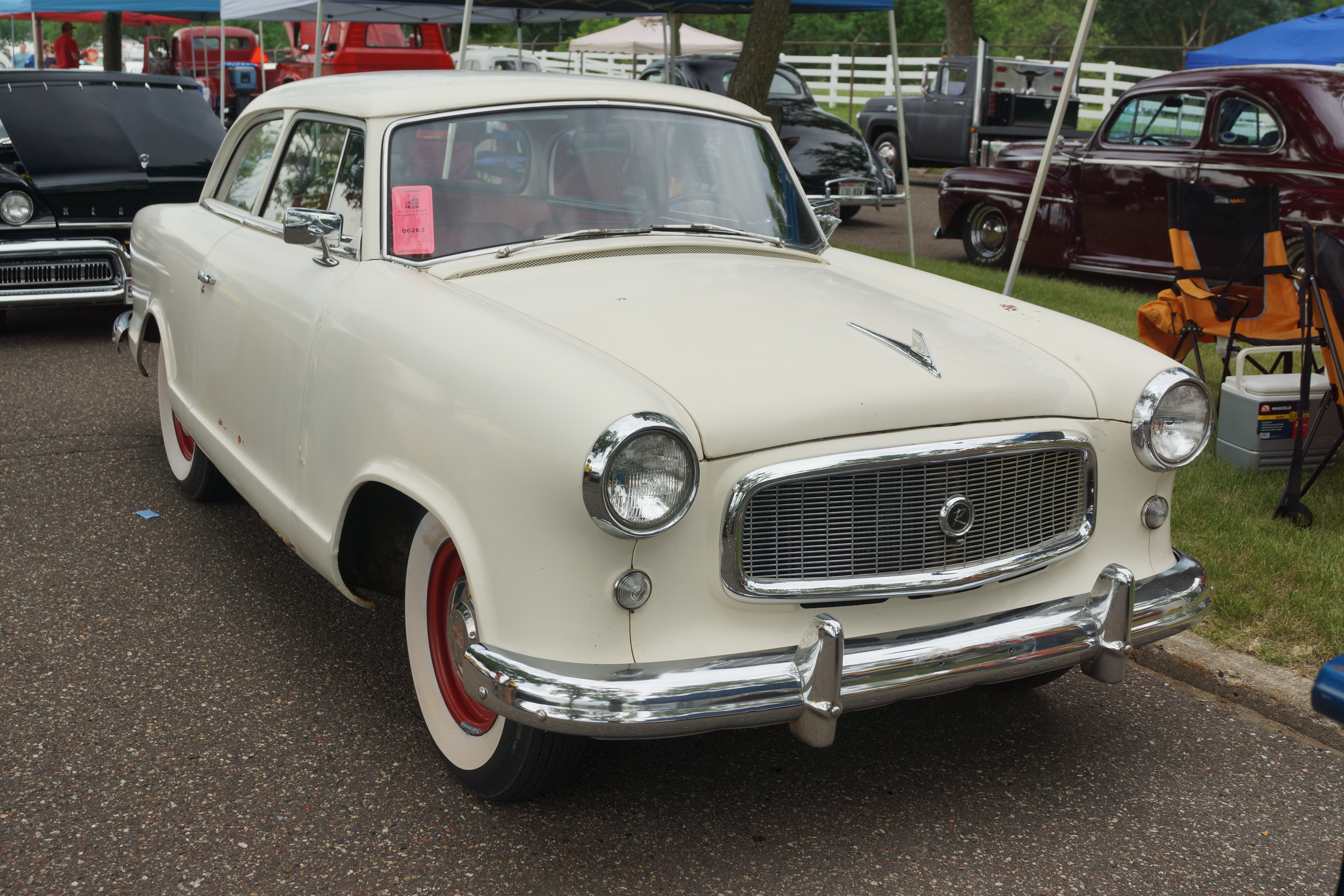
1958 Rambler American 2-door Super

Using the platform of the Nash Rambler, American Motors' designers gave the car a new grille and more open rear fender wells, giving the car a lighter appearance than that of the earlier car, which had hidden its rear wheels behind deeply skirted fenders. The original taillights were turned upside down, saving money on retooling. This design was originally mandated by Nash's Airflyte styling motif, which sought to reach for the blinding optimism of post-World War II transportation. The car's seemingly narrow 55-inch (1,397 mm) track was not much different from the industry standard, but rather an illusion fostered by the bulbous bodywork.

Romney worried about cannibalizing sales of his larger, more profitable senior Ramblers, so for 1958, the American was available only as a two-door sedan (senior Ramblers came only in a variety of four-door body styles). The only engine was a 195.6 cu in (3.2 L) flathead six producing 90 hp (67 kW; 91 PS). The American went on sale late January 1958, with a minimum of marketing and promotion. It was available in two trims, a base Deluxe model at US$1,789 (equivalent to $19,964 in 2025) allowing AMC to claim it to be the lowest-priced car made in America as well as a Super trim version for $1,874, offering more "luxuries". The car was advertised as being the only small car with an automatic transmission. All Americans were completely dipped in rust proofing.

The automotive press was positive to the reintroduced model. Tom McCahill wrote in Mechanix Illustrated, "There isn't a better buy in the world today." He continued, "The Rambler American ... is an ideal-size small family car... It will give up to 30 miles on a gallon of gas (and more, with overdrive) and will outperform any imported sedan selling for under $2,000 except in the cornering department... It is by far the most rattle-and-squeak-free 1958 Detroit product I've driven-and I've driven them all!"

Reports by owners praised the car's economy of operation, but ranked at the top its ease of handling. A "workhorse" priced at under $2,000, "it doesn't look as though every penny was pinched out of it", but retains a "chic look". The American found 30,640 buyers during the abbreviated 1958 model year, and helped Rambler become the only domestic make to post an increase in sales that year.

=== 1959 ===
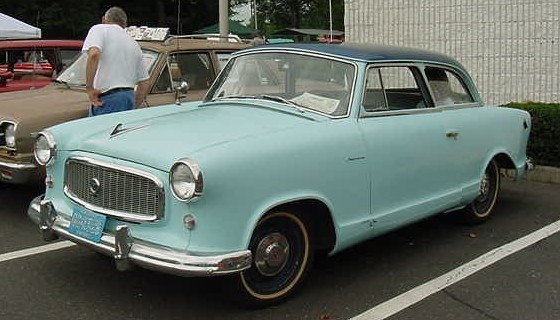
1959 Rambler American two-door Club Sedan

A two-door station wagon was added to the line in 1959. With the larger Rambler Six wagons offered only as four-door models, AMC's management thought little sales cannibalization from the American would occur. The Deluxe wagon was priced at $2,060, while the $2,145 Super version included a standard cargo-area mat and roof rack. A Deliveryman commercial wagon, with no rear seat and an extended cargo floor, was available, but found few takers. Self-adjusting brakes were added in 1959.

Rambler sales increased in 1959, and AMC struggled to keep up with demand, as production tripled to 91,491 Americans, with 32,639 (almost 36%) made up by the new wagon. The two-door sedans each sold nearly as well, also, at 29,954 for the lower-priced Deluxe and 28,449 for the top-line Super.

=== 1960 ===
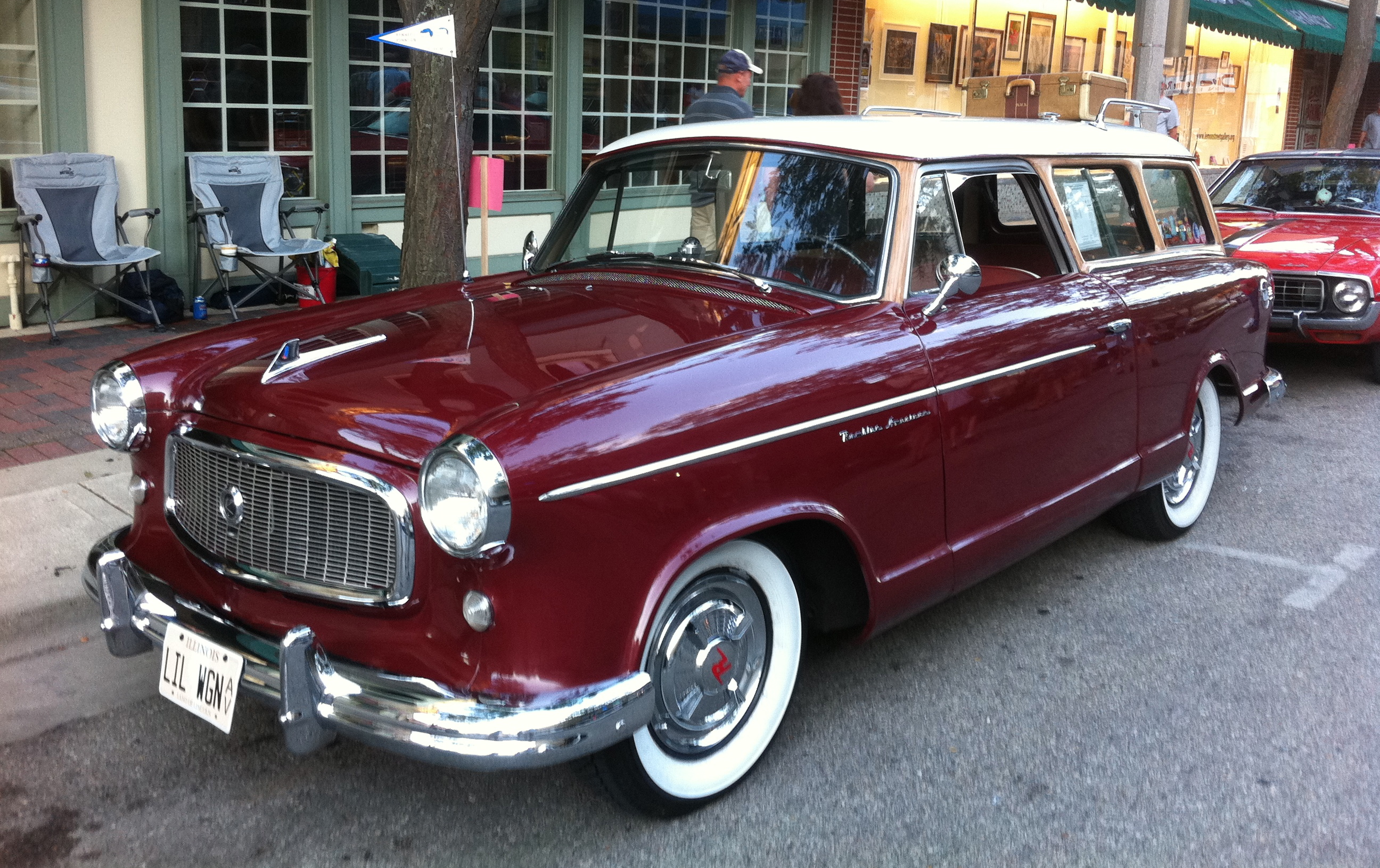
1960 Rambler American Custom wagon

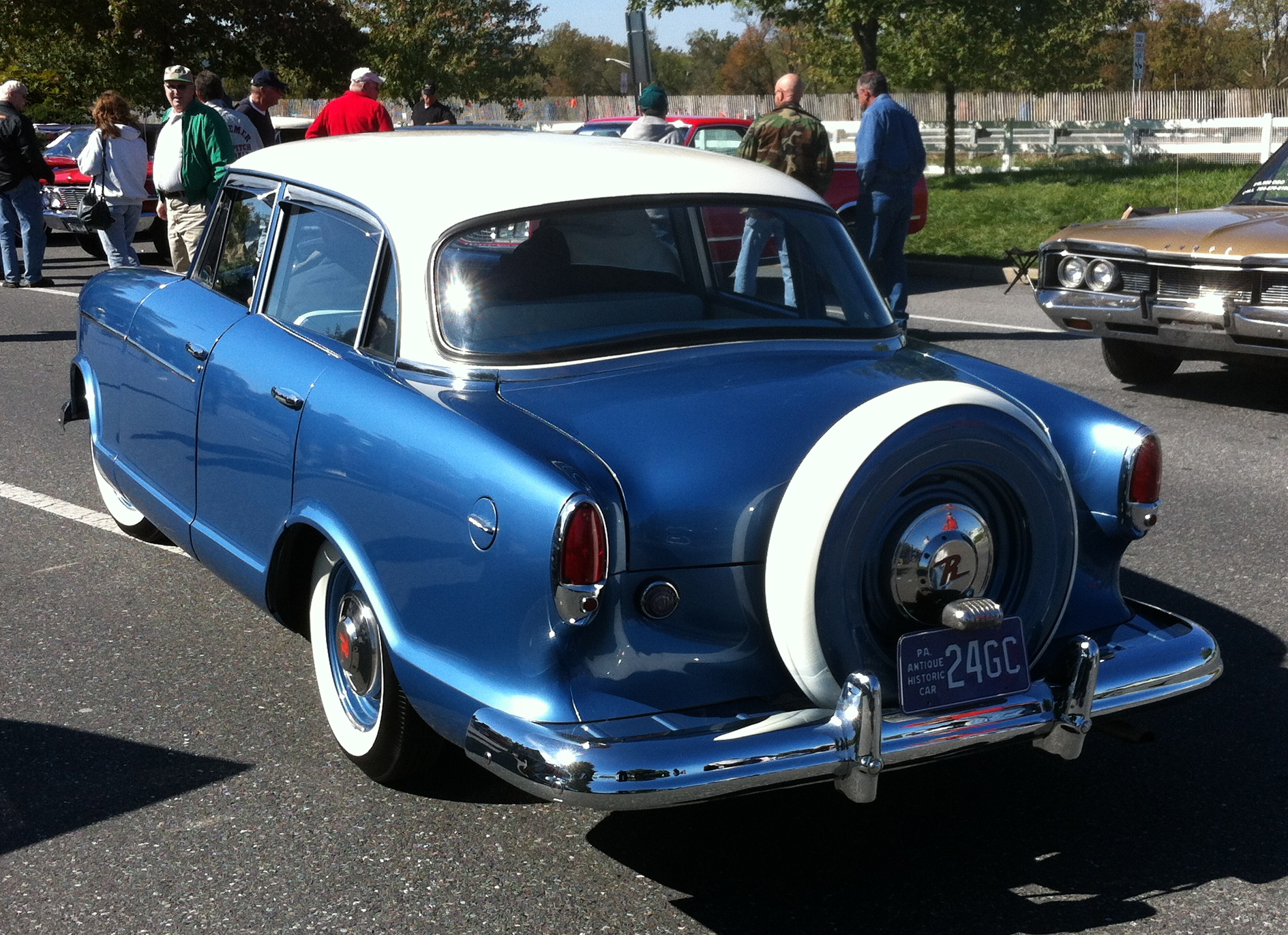
1960 Rambler American four-door sedan with optional continental kit

For the 1960 model year, the Rambler American line added a four-door sedan body style and a third trim level, a top-of-the-line Custom. The new four-door rode on the same 100 in (2,540 mm) wheelbase as the other models and was meant to battle the newly introduced compacts from the Big Three, the Ford Falcon, Chevrolet Corvair, and Plymouth Valiant.

The new Custom model came standard with a new 195.6 cu in (3.2 L) overhead valve engine with a slightly higher compression ratio of 8.7:1 producing an additional 37 hp (28 kW; 38 PS), for a total output of 125 hp (93 kW; 127 PS), while the base models retained the flathead as the standard engine. The flathead six had no visible intake manifold since it was integrated within the cylinder head, while the exhaust manifold is a "log-type" that looks like a long tube. All models received an enlarged gas tank, now 22 US gal (83 L; 18 imp gal) capacity, while power steering was a new option.

Even in the face of the new competition from much larger automakers, the compact Rambler American enjoyed appeal not only because of its low initial price, economy, and high gas mileage, but also because its resale values ranked among the highest. The suggested delivered price for the Deluxe two-door sedan was $1,795, and it was advertised as the lowest-priced car in America.

Demand for the small-sized American continued to grow, as sales increased to 120,603 units (of which 44,817 were two-door sedans, 46,973 four-door sedans, and 28,813 station wagons). This helped AMC achieve 7.5% of the U.S. market with a total Rambler sales of 485,745 and third place among domestic brands.

== Second generation ==
Second generation
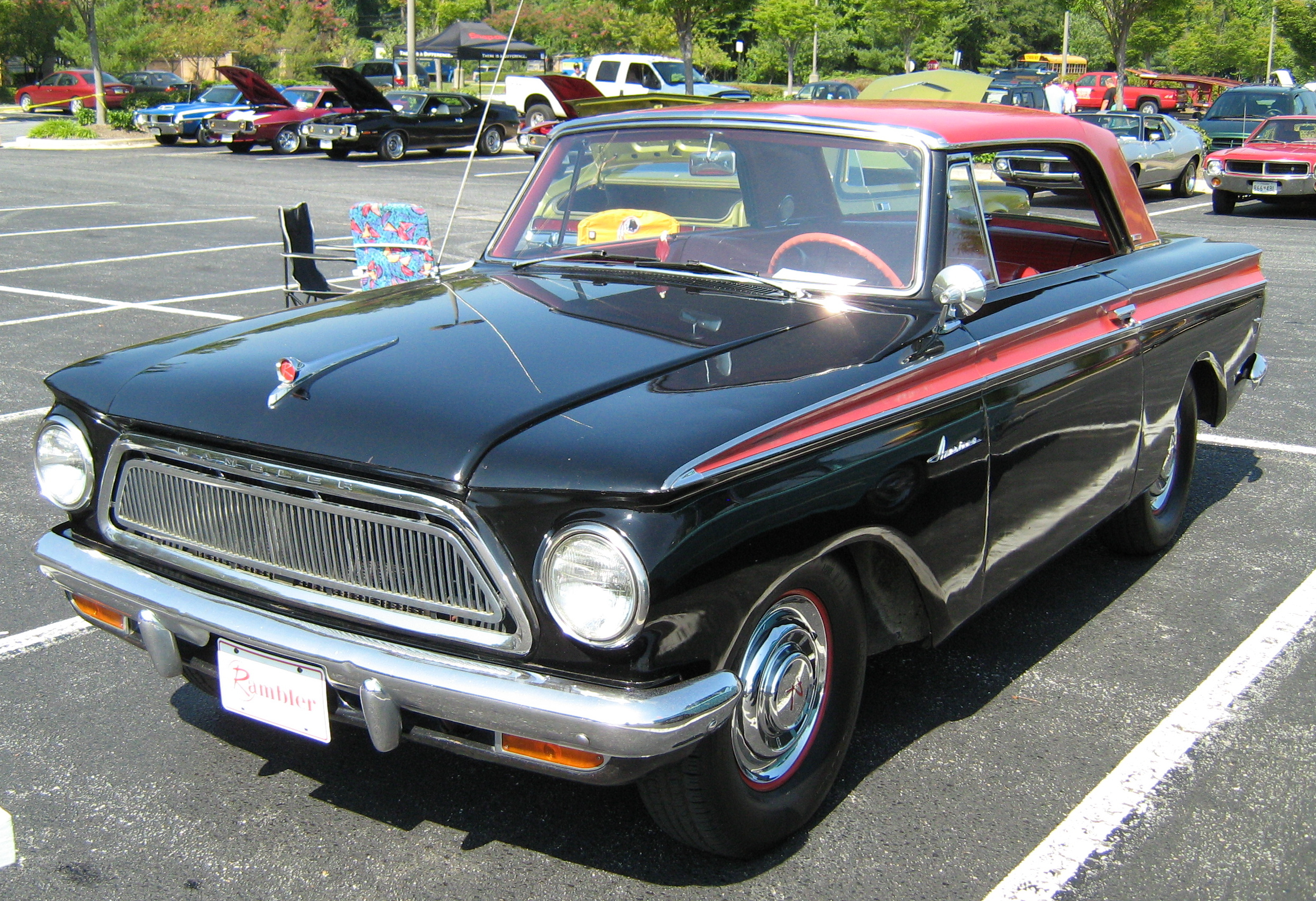
- 1963 American 440-H hardtop

Overview
- Production: 1961–1963
- Designer: Edmund E. Anderson

Body and chassis
- Body style: 2/4-door sedan; 2-door convertible; 2-door hardtop (1963); 2/4-door station wagon

Powertrain
- Engine: 195.6 cu in (3.2 L) I6

Dimensions
- Wheelbase: 100 in (2,540 mm)
- Length: 173.1 in (4,397 mm)
- Width: 70 in (1,778 mm)
- Height: 56.2 in (1,427 mm)

The second-generation Rambler American was achieved through a heavy restyling of the previous year's model under AMC's styling Vice President Edmund E. Anderson. While mechanically identical to the 1960 model, Anderson's restyle resulted in a car that was three inches (76 mm) narrower and shorter in its exterior dimensions with an overall length of 173.1 in (4,397 mm), but increased in its cargo capacity. Continuing to ride on the 100-inch (2,540 mm) wheelbase, the American's new styling was more square (sometimes described as "breadbox") instead of the round "roly-poly" shape (or "bathtub"), and the visual connection with the original 1950 Nash model had finally disappeared along with the last of the engineering compromises required to accommodate George Mason's favored skirted front wheels as the new skin, designed from the outset with open wheel arches in mind, reduced overall width a full three inches. Popular Mechanics wrote "seldom has a car been completely restyled as the 1961 Rambler American and yet retain the same engine, driveline, suspension on the same unit body". All outside sheet metal was changed, but the side window frames remained the same as previous models. Only the rear glass was changed to conform to the new roofline. The firewall and dashboard were new stampings that also changed the clutch and brake pedal mountings from under the floor to the firewall.

=== 1961 ===
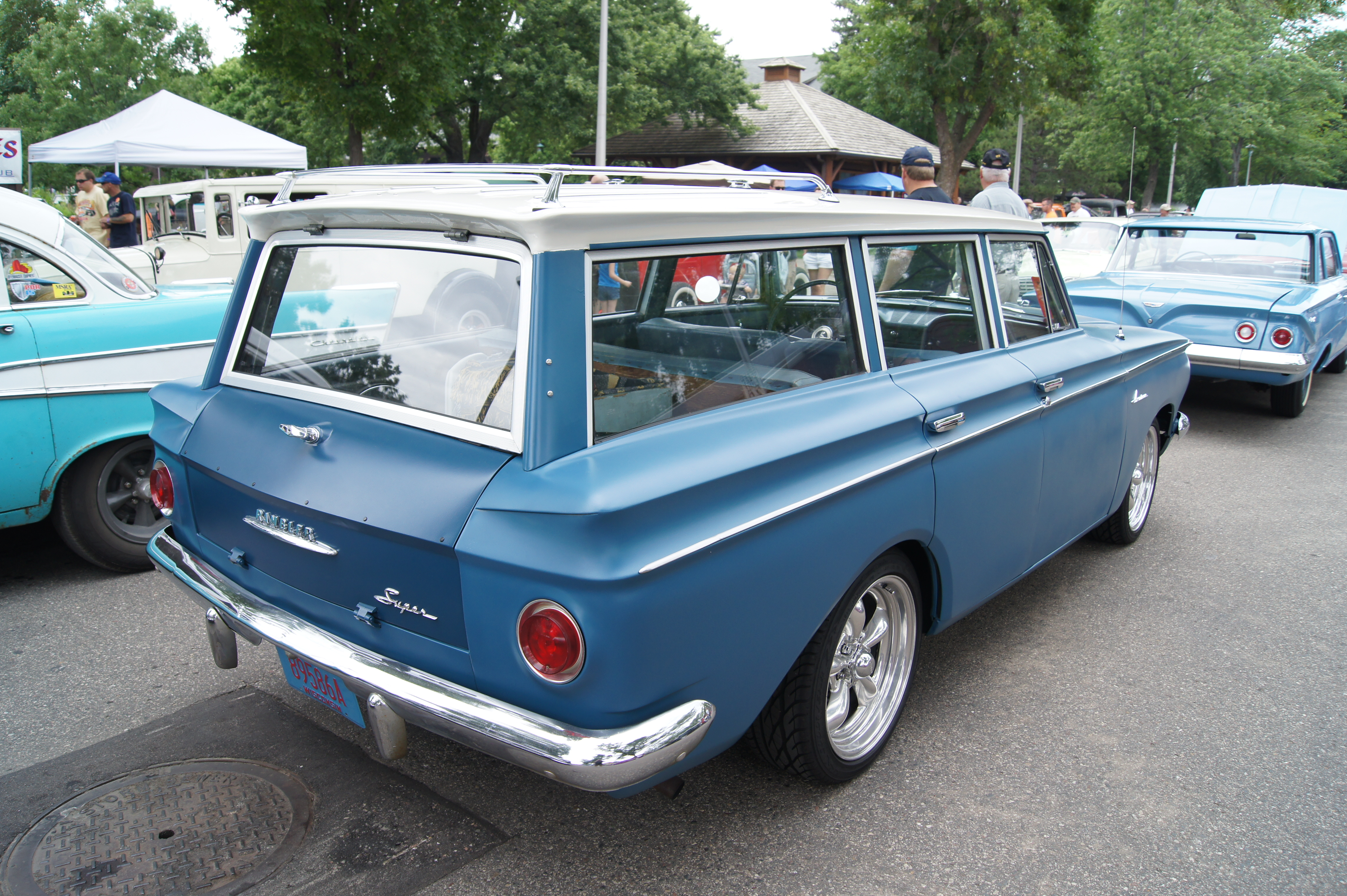
1961 Rambler American four-door wagon Super (aftermarket wheels)

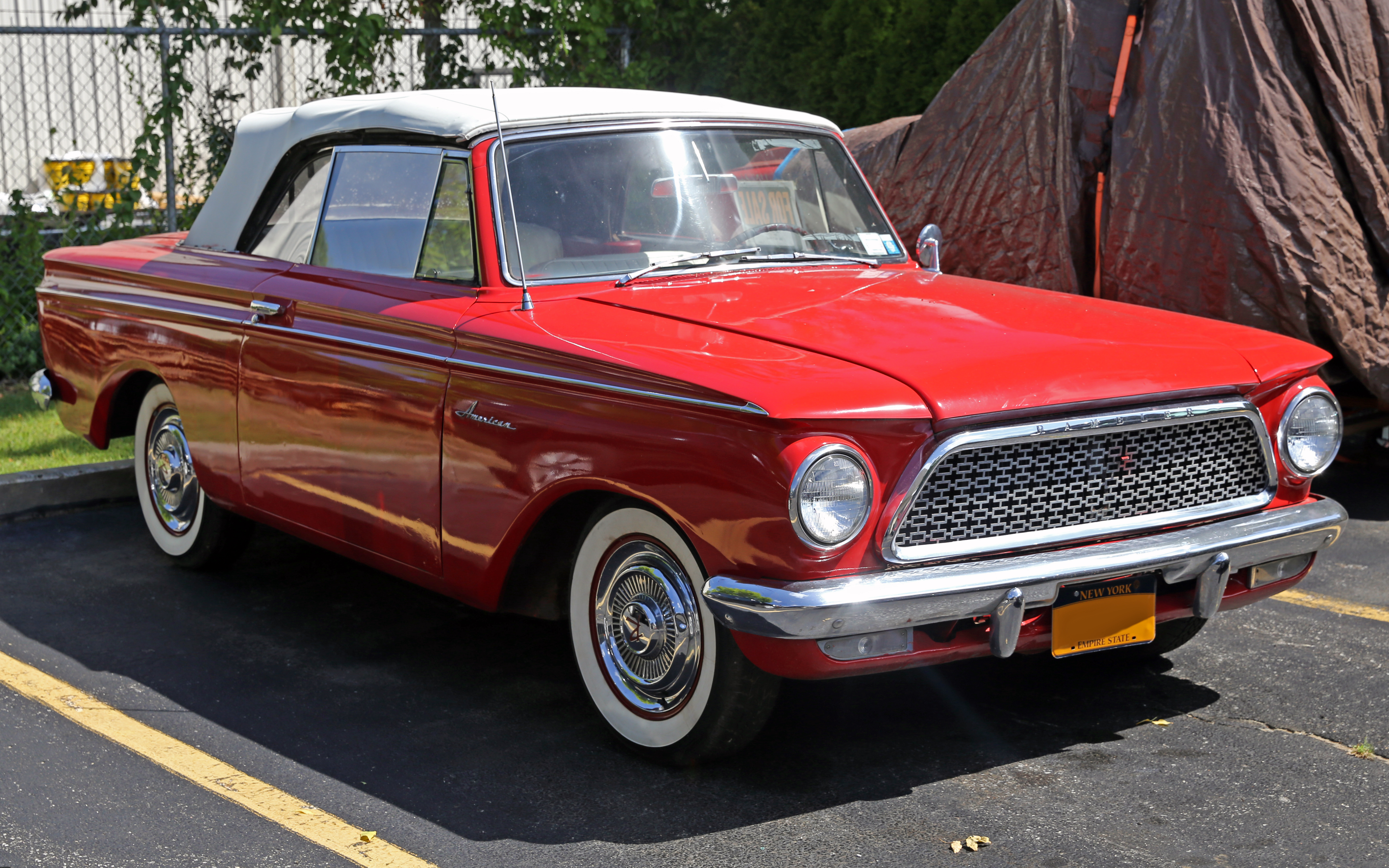
1961 Rambler American Custom Convertible

For 1961 the American line added a four-door station wagon and a two-door convertible for the first time since 1954. It featured a power-operated folding top with roll-down door glass, rather than the fixed side-window frames of the original design. Passenger room increased from five to six.

The straight-six engine was modernized with an overhead-valve cylinder head for higher-grade models, but the base cars continued with the flathead engine.

American Motors built a new assembly plant in Brampton, Ontario, Canada, for the production of Rambler Americans, as well as the larger Rambler Classics.

=== 1962 ===
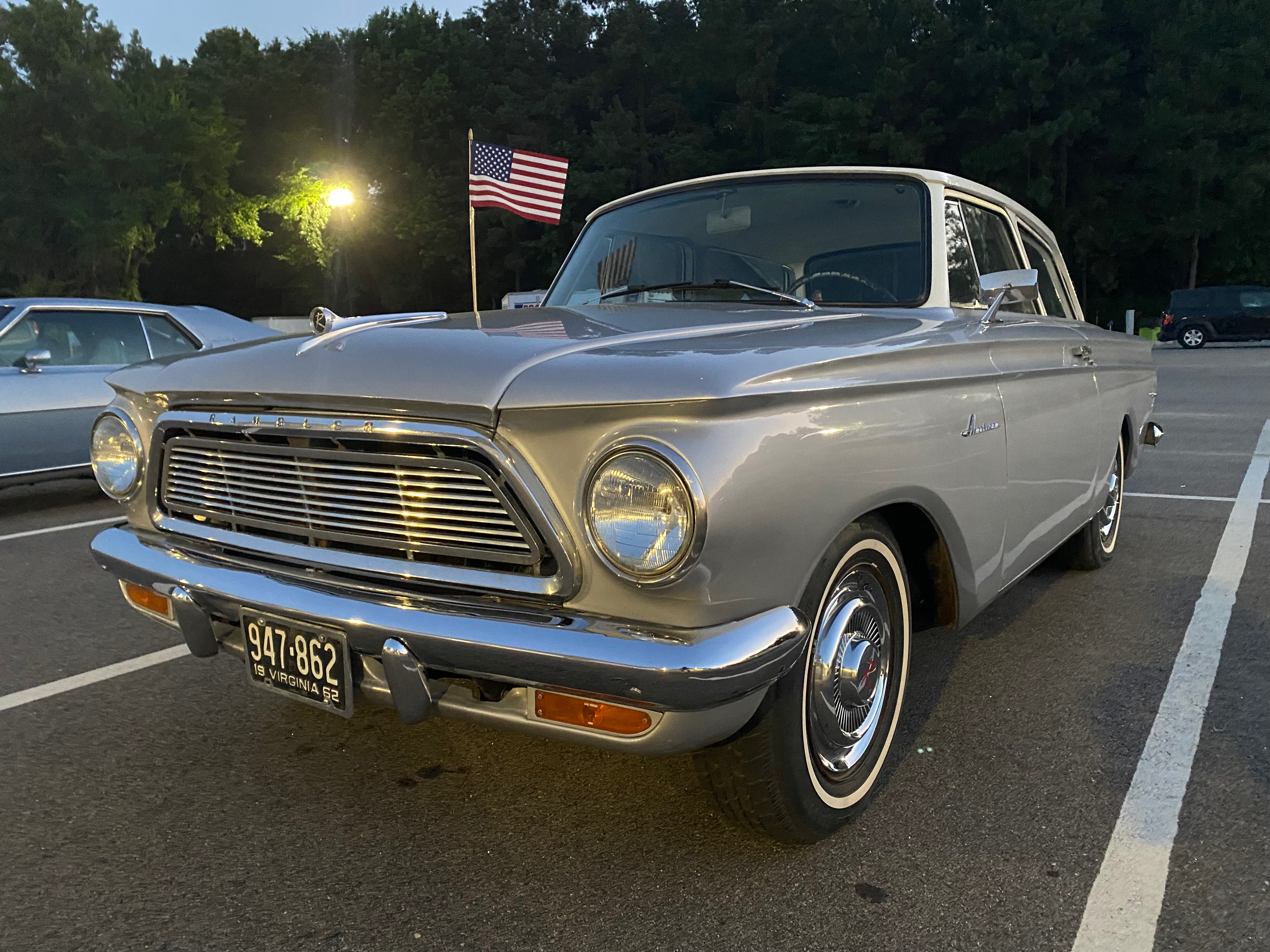
1962 Rambler American Deluxe 2-door sedan

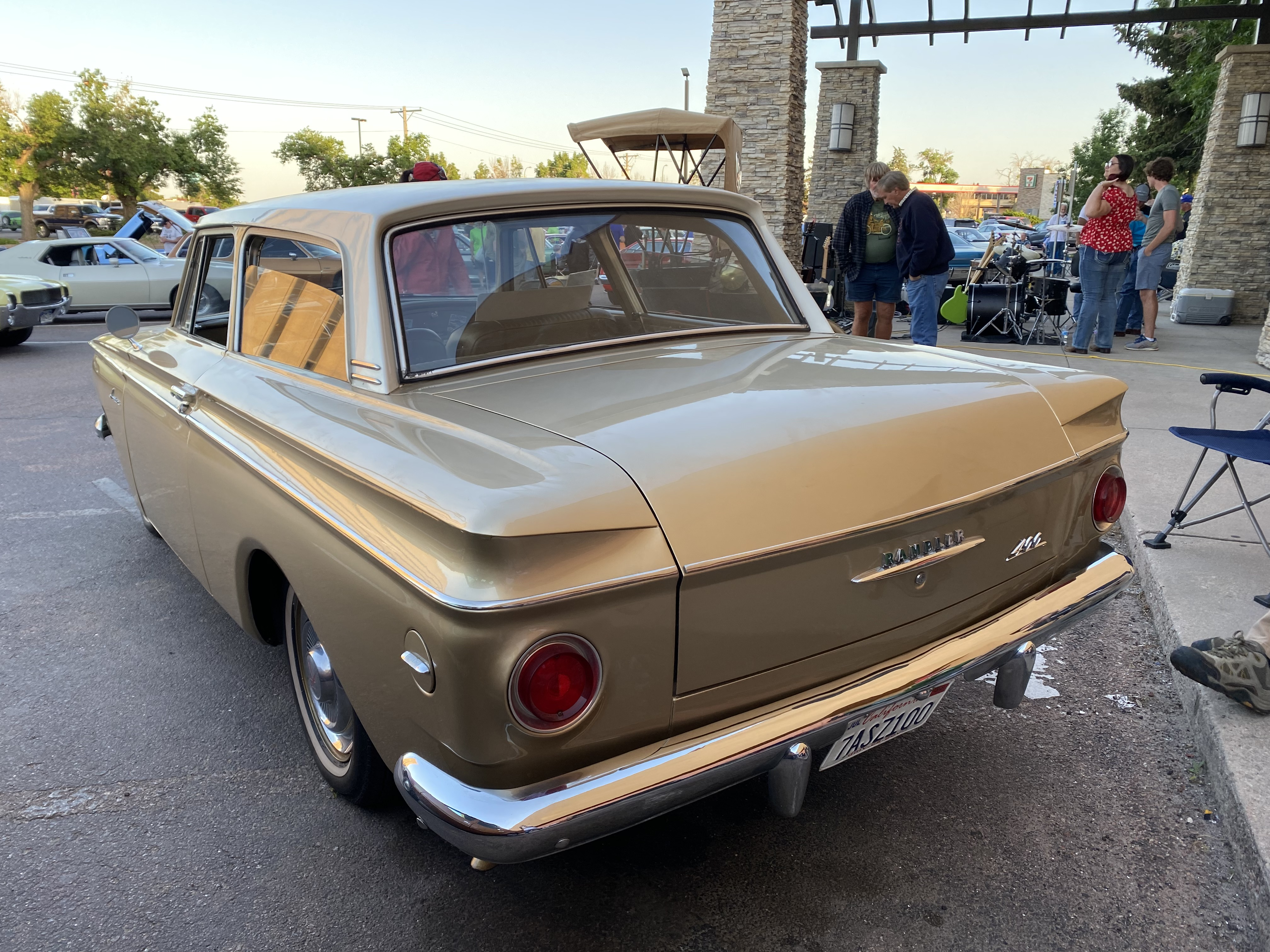
1962 Rambler American 400 2-door sedan

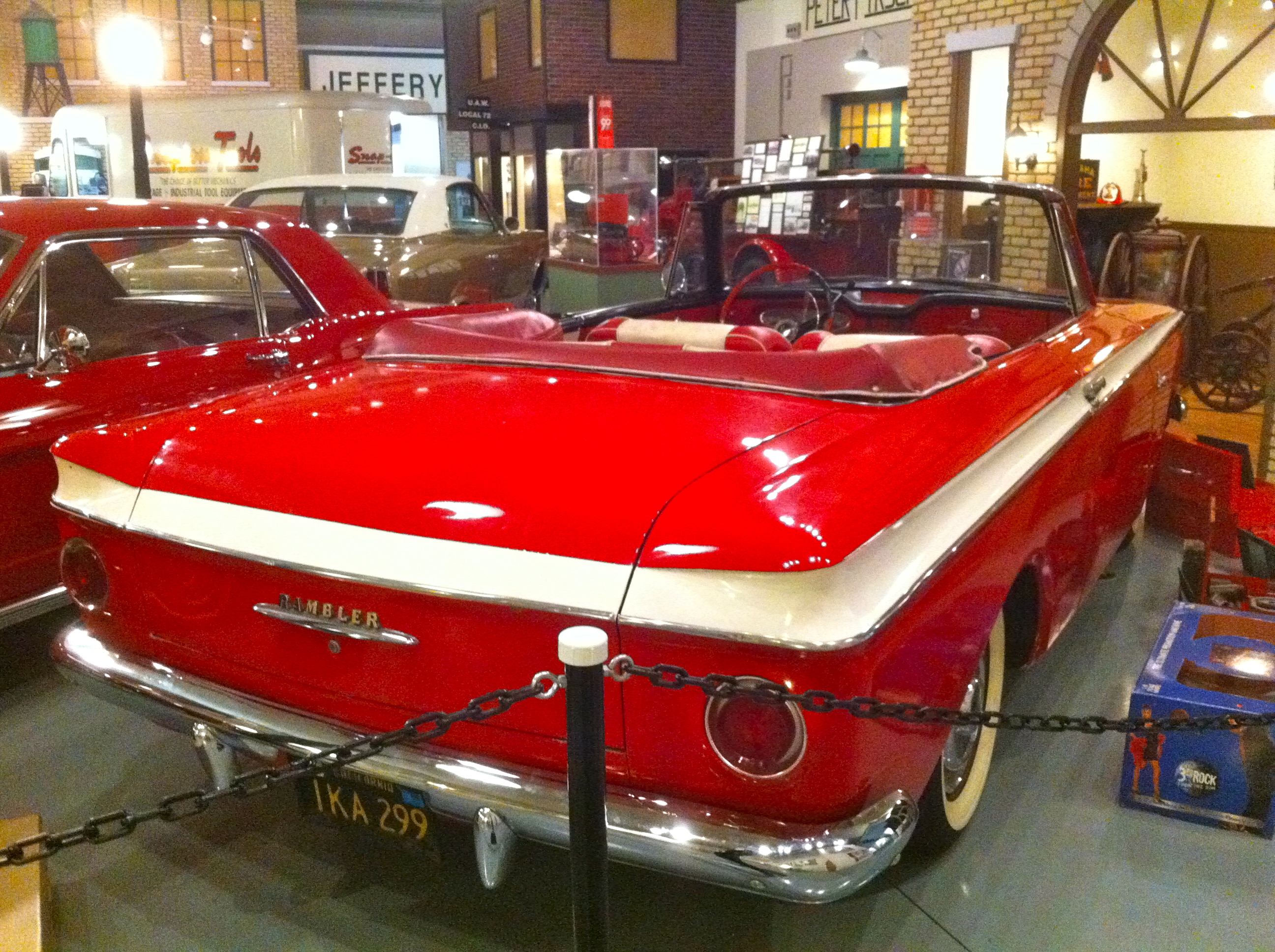
The 1962 Rambler American "400" Convertible used in the 3rd Rock from the Sun TV show

Setting new sales records, American Motors continued its "policy of making changes only when they truly benefited the customer." The 1962 model year Rambler American lineup was essentially the same as in 1961. However, model designations changed with the base models designated "Deluxe", a mid-level trim called "Custom" displaced the Super, and the previous Custom top trim became a 400.

American Motors incorporated a new brake system in all 1962 Rambler models. The "Double-Safety" braking featured a tandem master cylinder with one hydraulic circuit for the front brakes and a second for the rear brakes. Operating normally in unison, braking would still be available should there be a puncture in a hydraulic line. Only the Rolls-Royce, Jaguar, and the 1962 Cadillac offered this advanced safety feature. Regulations in the United States finally mandated twin-circuit brake systems on all cars starting with 1967 model year production.

A new "E-stick" option combined a manual three-speed transmission with an automatic clutch as a low-cost alternative to the fully automatic transmission. The E-stick was also available with an overdrive unit. The system was priced at $59.50 but offered stick-shift economy, performance, and driver control without a clutch pedal by using engine oil pressure and intake manifold vacuum to engage and disengage the clutch when shifting gears. However, the system was complex and the option did not sell well.

Although the Big Three domestic automakers had introduced competitive compact models by 1962, the Rambler American remained the oldest, smallest, and "stubbornly unique", refusing "to conform to Detroit's standard pattern for scaled-down automobiles" and "free of gimmicky come-ons." A 10,000-mile (16,093 km) road test by Popular Science described the 1962 Rambler American as "sturdy, solid, dependable little automobile, comfortable to drive ... a good buy for what it's built for – transportation, not a status symbol."

The 1962 models included many improvements to lower maintenance requirements that included self-adjusting brakes, oil filters and changes extended from 2,000 to 5,000 miles (3,219 to 8,047 km), larger cellulose-fiber air filters for extended life, manual transmission that never need draining, improved automatic transmissions with longer mileage between fluid changes, factory filled engine coolant guaranteed for two years or 24,000 miles (38,624 km), deep-dip rustproofing with the entire body is submerged in rustproofing primer paint, ceramic coated tailpipes with the coated muffler wrapped in asbestos and included a rust-resistant aluminized steel shield with the muffler guaranteed to the original owner for the life of the car, aluminum window frames (sedan models), batteries guaranteed for two years or 24,000 miles (38,624 km) without any pro-rata charges, and numerous moving mechanical components now incorporating life-time lubrication eliminating customary grease or lubricant servicing. All front seats included deeper foam cushioning as standard on top of rubber-coated coil spring seat construction. Attaching plates for front seat belts made it easy to install seat belts while locating indentations were provided for adding lap belts for rear seat passengers. Furthermore, the Rambler American models continued to be the most affordable domestic-built cars.

The automaker's president, George W. Romney, appeared prominently in advertisements, asking potential customers to "think hard" about new cars and describing "more than 100 improvements in the 1962 Ramblers" and why they are not available in competitive vehicles, as well as AMC "workers as progress-sharing partners" so that buyers can "expect superior craftsmanship." Car Life magazine noted the level of workmanship on the Rambler Americans was "not only acceptable but actually admirable." Production for the 1962 model year totaled 125,678 Rambler Americans of which almost 13,500 were convertibles. The Rambler brand ended in fourth place among all the manufacturers for the year.

A significant change in leadership of AMC occurred in February 1962 when Romney resigned to enter politics and eventually become the Governor of Michigan. Roy Abernethy took over as president after successfully building a substantial dealer network for AMC from the dissimilar Nash and Hudson outlets. His strategy was to move AMC away from Romney's economy focus and expand the product line to meet the "Big Three" domestic automakers head-on.

=== 1963 ===
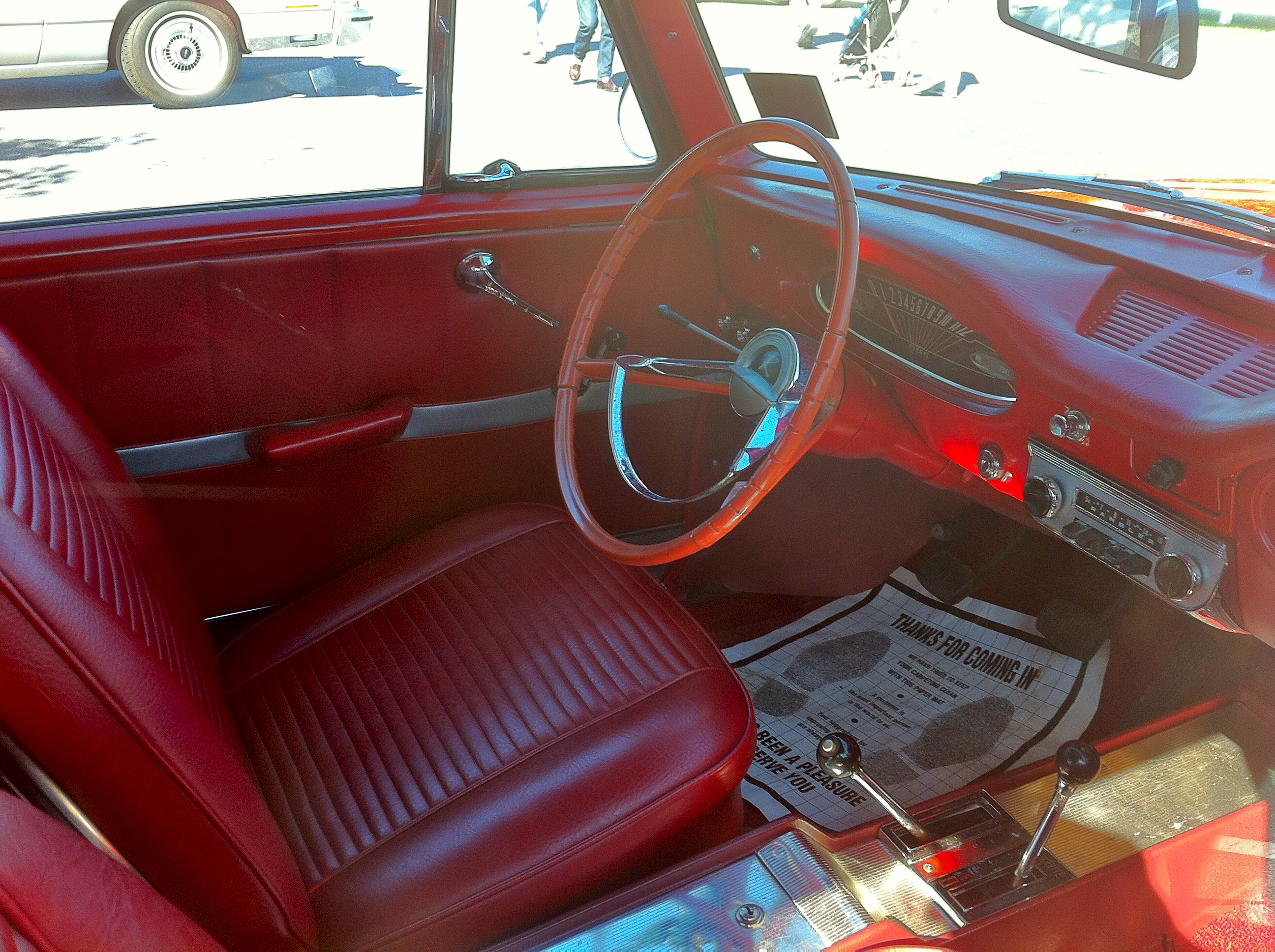
1963 Rambler American 440 hardtop with "Twin-Stick" manual overdrive transmission

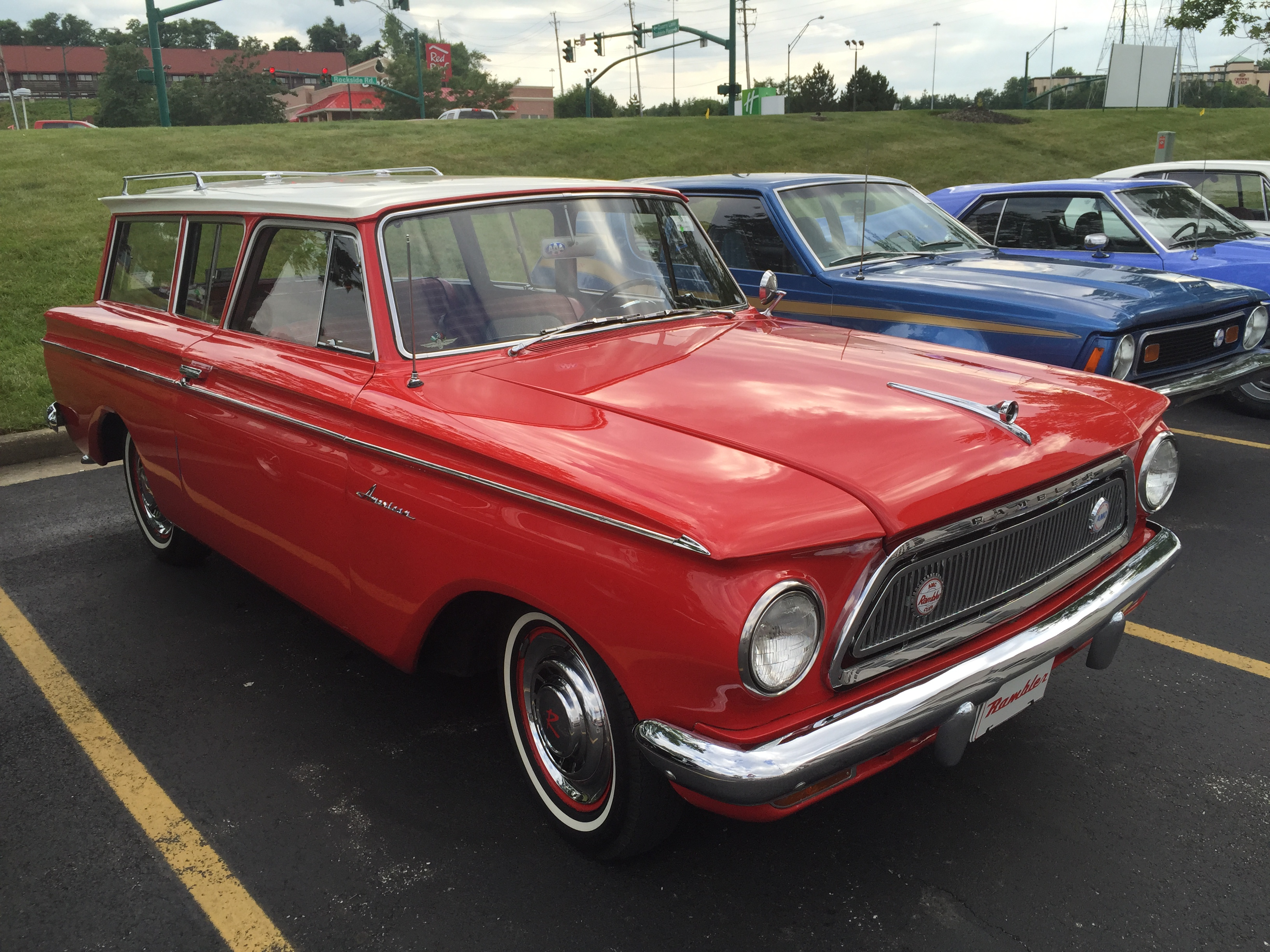
1963 Rambler American 330 two-door station wagon

For 1963, model designations were changed once again with the 400 now called 440. A new hardtop (no B-pillar) coupe body design debuted, whose steel roof was designed to mimic the appearance of a closed convertible top. This was a one-model-year-only design with a thin profile, clean lines, stamped faux-convertible ribs, and a textured finish. A special top-of-the-line model called the 440-H was equipped with sports-type features, including individually adjustable reclining front bucket seats and a center console, as well as a more powerful 138 hp (103 kW; 140 PS) version of Rambler's stalwart 195.6 cu in (3.2 L) inline-six engine.

An optional console-shifted "Twin-Stick" manual overdrive transmission was introduced. This transmission has a bigger gap between second and third gears compared to the regular three-speed transmissions with overdrive (that operated like a five-speed although the driver needed to know the governor cut-in speed, free-wheeling, as well as when to lock the overdrive in or out). This allowed the transmission to be shifted like a five-speed in the following sequence: 1, 2, 2+OD, 3, and 3+OD. The Twin-Stick has a kick-down button on top of the main shift knob to facilitate the five-speed shifting process.

The entire product line from AMC earned the Motor Trend Car of the Year award for 1963. The recognition was used by AMC to also promote the carryover Rambler American models.

As the Nash Rambler, and later the Rambler American, the automobile had two distinct commercially successful models. The convertible and hardtop are considered sportier versions of the 100-inch (2,540 mm) wheelbase Rambler American models.

== Third generation ==
Third generation
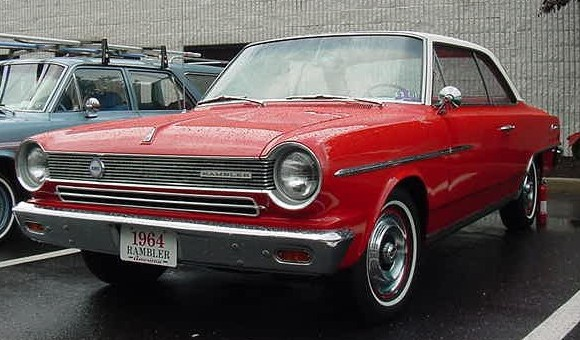
- 1964 Rambler American 440-H hardtop

Overview
- Also called: Aria and Shahin built by Pars Khodro (Iran)
- Production: 1964–1969
- Designer: Dick Teague

Body and chassis
- Body style: 2-door convertible; 2-door hardtop; 2-door coupe; 4-door sedan; 4-door station wagon
- Related: IKA Torino (Argentina)

Powertrain
- Engine: 195.6 cu in (3.2 L) I6; 199 cu in (3.3 L) I6; 232 cu in (3.8 L) I6; 290 cu in (4.8 L) V8 2-bbl; 290 cu in (4.8 L) V8 4-bbl; 343 cu in (5.6 L) V8 4-bbl; 390 cu in (6.4 L) V8 4-bbl
- Transmission: 3-speed manual; 3-speed with overdrive; 4-speed manual; 3-speed automatic; 3-speed semi-automatic

Dimensions
- Wheelbase: 106 in (2,692 mm)
- Length: 177.25 in (4,502 mm) (1964-65); 181 in (4,597 mm) (1966-69)
- Width: 70.8 in (1,798 mm)
- Height: 54.5 in (1,384 mm)
- Curb weight: Approximate: 2,500 lb (1,134 kg)

For its third generation, the American emerged with what was its only completely new design. The entire line was treated to neat and trim lines with pleasing simplicity (compared to the more boxy predecessors) with characteristic tunneled headlights with a simple horizontal grille between them. The Rambler American's wheelbase grew by six inches or 152 mm (to 106 in or 2692 mm) and the interiors were made more spacious. The station wagons in the restyled 1964 series came with four doors and gained 17% more cargo space compared to the previous design. They all featured a new roll-down disappearing rear window for the bottom-hinged tailgate. Full coil front springs, along with soft rear leaf units, gave the new American an unusually smooth ride, better than many larger domestic cars. The new models also incorporated various parts and components (such as doors) that were interchangeable with AMC's larger cars. In essence, the new body was a shorter, narrower version of the previous year's new Rambler Classic.

The new styling was the work of designer Dick Teague, who later designed the 1968 Javelin and AMX. Teague selected the front-end design developed by Bob Nixon, who was later in charge of AMC's small-car studio. Many viewed the newly designed station wagon as the best looking of any American wagon, with its new trim lines, with ample passenger and cargo room. Led by the top-line 440-series convertible, they were arguably the 1964's most attractive Detroit compacts. Car Life magazine titled its road test of the 1964 Rambler American: "The Original Plain Jane Compact Car Just Got Back From the Beauty Parlor".

=== 1964 ===
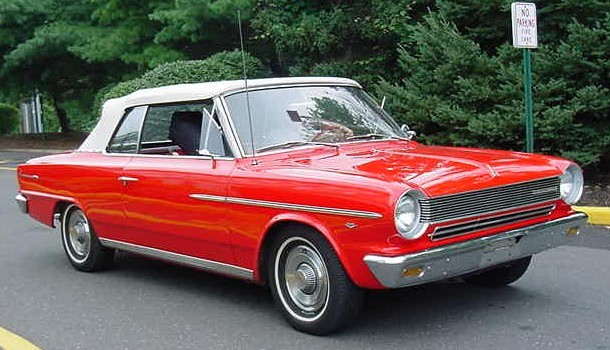
1964 American 440 convertible

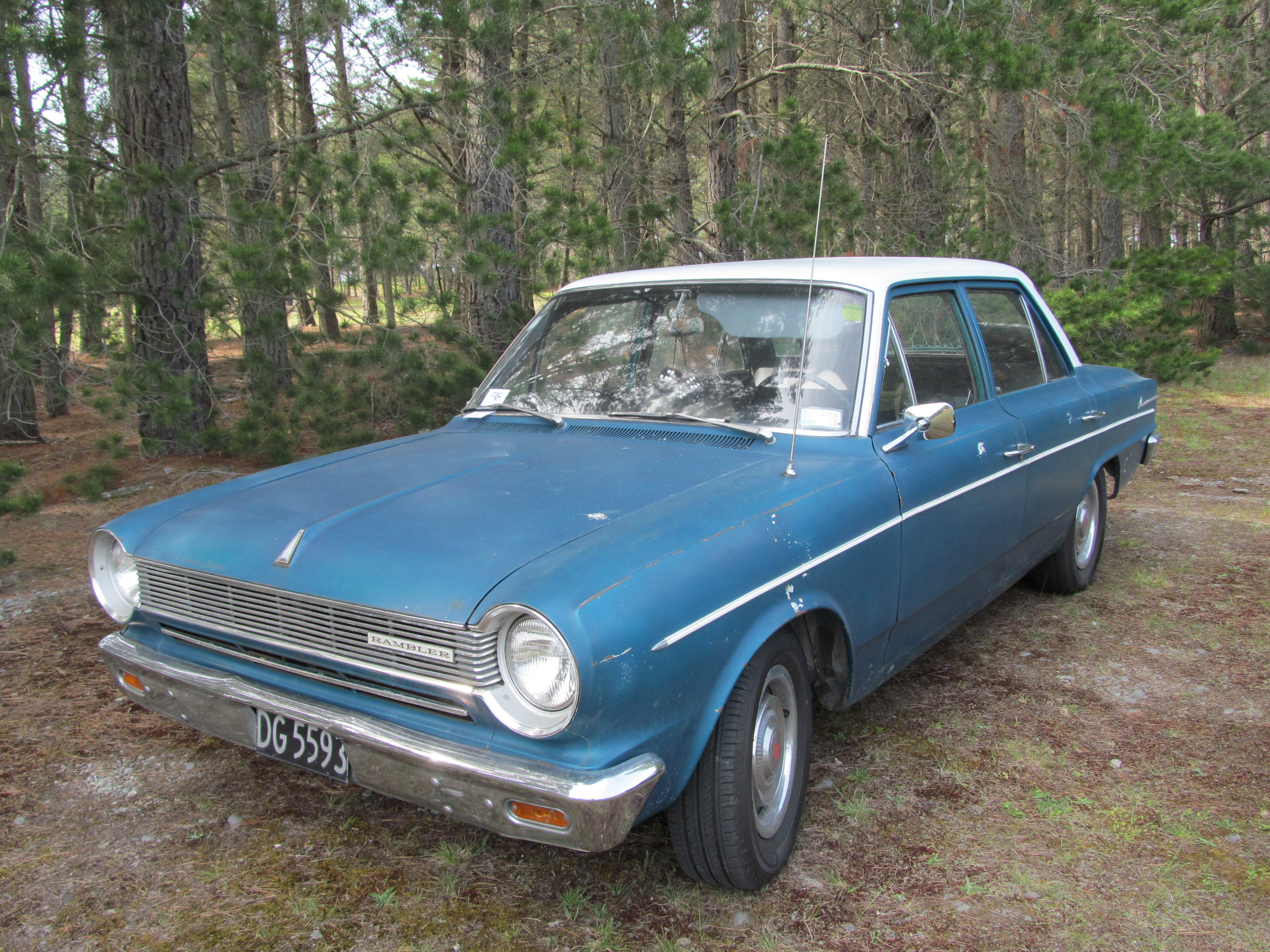
1964 American 220 Sedan

In addition to the top-of-the-line 440 models, the lower trim 330 and 220 models were also available, and Rambler American sales increased to a record 160,000-plus. The old 195.6 cu in (3.2 L) I6 was an economy champ in the Mobil Economy Runs and available in 90 hp (67 kW; 91 PS), 125 hp (93 kW; 127 PS), and 138 hp (103 kW; 140 PS) versions.

American Motors focused its marketing on the economy of the new models, advertising that was previously only popular during the Great Depression. The company's series of "Love Letters to Rambler" advertisements included "ordinary user testimonials" about the economy and reliability of their Ramblers, rather than in pursuit of buyers in the whole compact car market segment. This strategy was copied 10 years later by Datsun.

=== 1965 ===
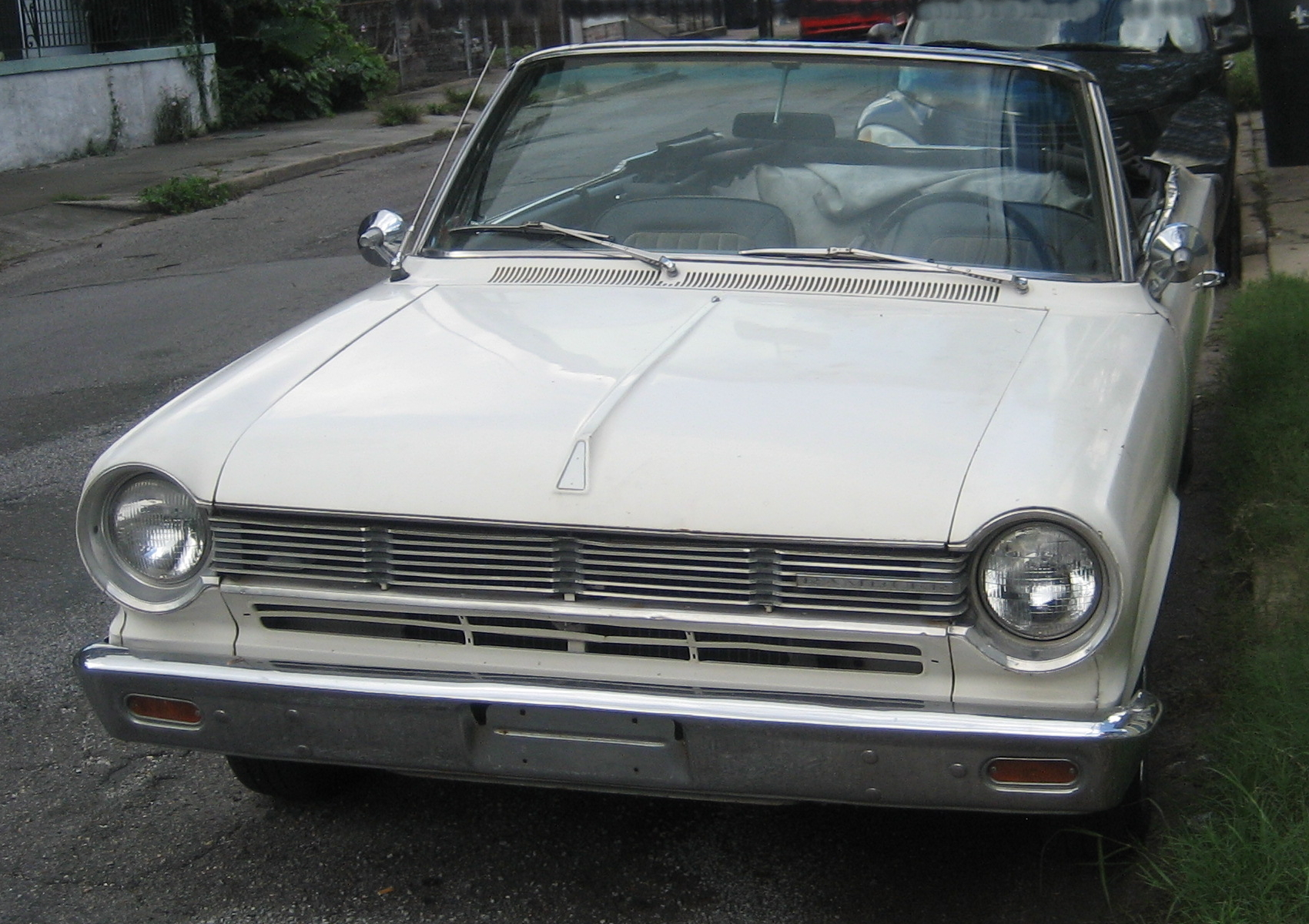
1965 American 440 convertible

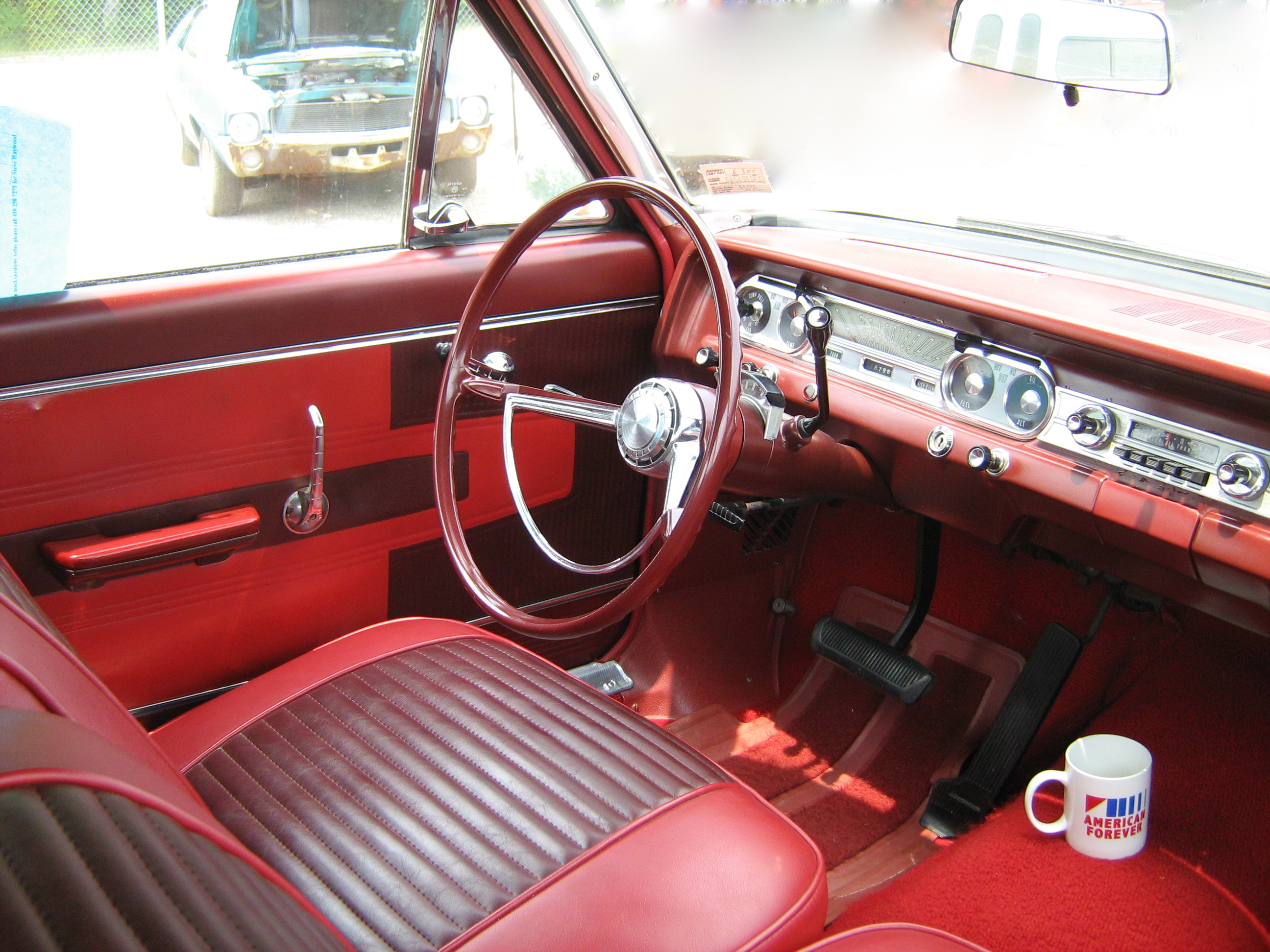
1965 Rambler American interior

The 1965 Americans were little changed, but were advertised as "The Sensible Spectaculars". This was part of Roy Abernethy's strategy for AMC to shed its "economy car" reputation and take on the domestic Big Three automakers in new market segments. Few changes were made to AMC's smallest models, as Abernethy pinned his hopes for recovery not so much on the low-priced Rambler American as on the medium and higher-priced Classic and Ambassador lines.

The 1965 models were the last year for the venerable flathead six available in 90 hp (67 kW; 91 PS) or 125 hp (93 kW; 127 PS) versions. It was the last flathead engine to be used in a domestic U.S. car.

The year also had the introduction of an entirely new 232 cu in (3.8 L) overhead-valve straight-six engine. This 155 hp (116 kW; 157 PS) engine was available on any American model equipped with an automatic transmission. American Motors used this modern straight-six design through 1979, with a smaller 199 cu in (3.3 L) version used 1966–1970. The same engine was later available in a larger 258 cu in (4.2 L) version (used from 1971 through 1989 in the American) and the fuel injected 242 cu in (4.0 L) versions that debuted in 1987, known as the Jeep 4.0, which Chrysler would continue their production after its purchase of AMC in 1987, all the way through 2006.

The 440 trim was available as a convertible, and it was the most affordable U.S.-made open body style with prices starting at US$2,418 (equivalent to $24,703 in 2025). It was available with twin individually adjustable and reclining front seats or buckets with a center console. It was one of the best convertibles on the market, but lacked some sporty features that buyers wanted, such as a V8 engine.

==== Rambler Carrousel ====
The 1964 Chicago Auto Show featured a special version of a top-of-the-line American named the Rambler Carrousel on raised rotating platform. The 1965 show car exterior was finished in "Turquoise Fireflake" and a white leather interior with turquoise carpeting, instrument panel, and slim bucket seats. Other features included die-cast aluminum road wheels and AMC's console-mounted Twin-Stick manual transmission.

American Motors made specially trimmed, production-based show cars and the Carrousel was one of three concepts displayed for 1965 at the Chicago Show, with the Rambler Tarpon fastback and the Rambler Cheyenne station wagon.

=== 1966 ===
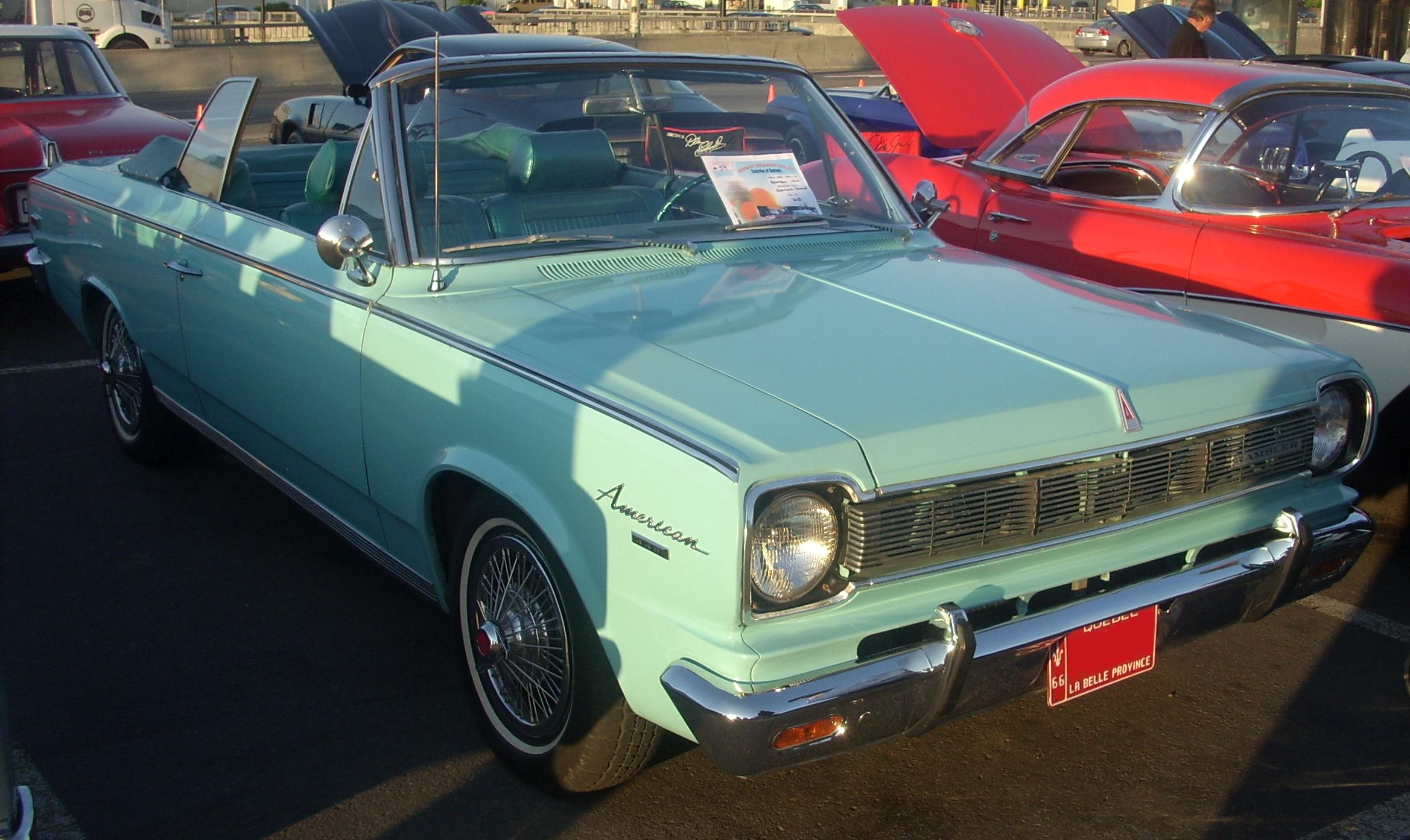
1966 American 440 convertible

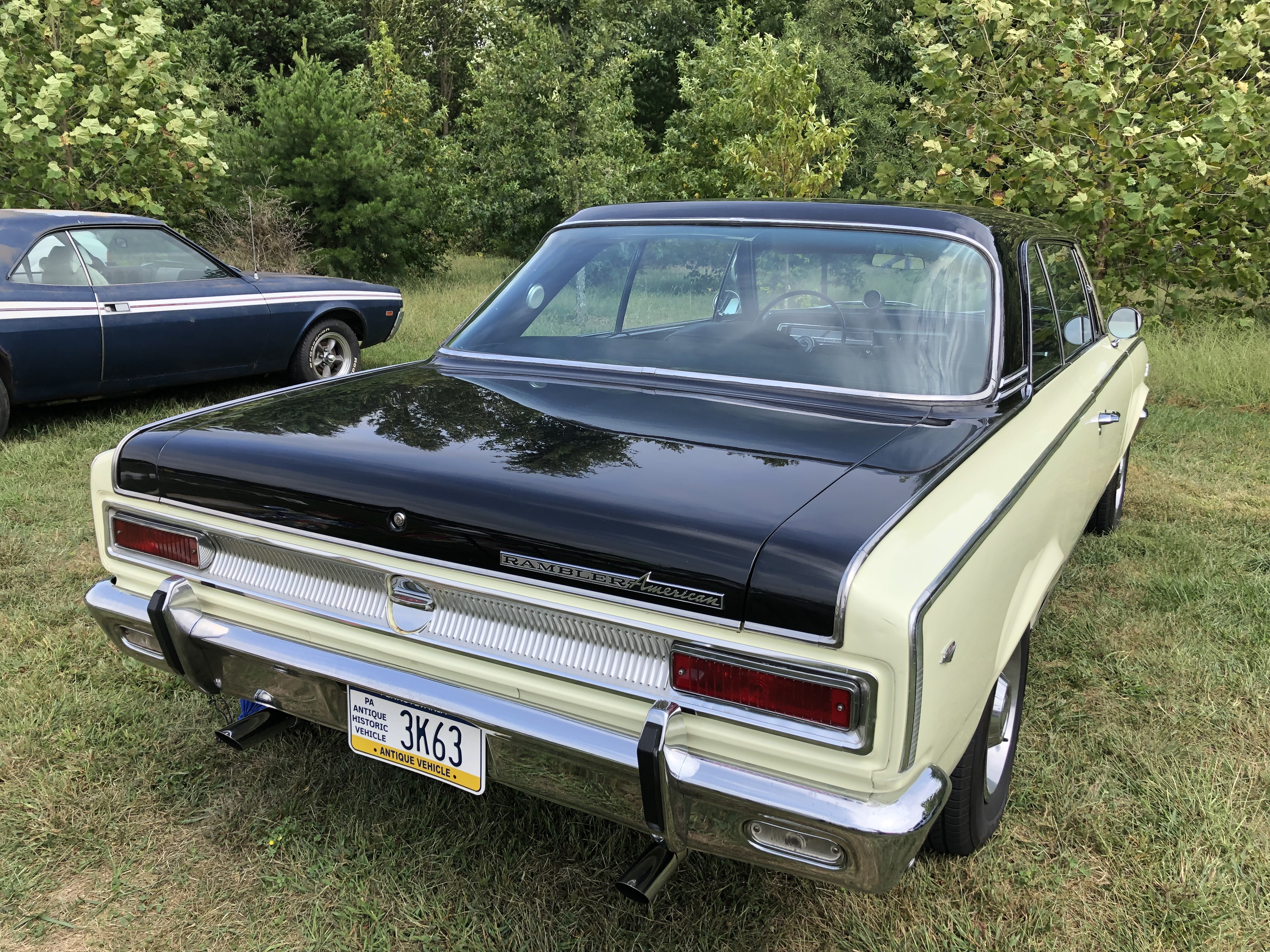
1966 Rambler Rogue two-door-hardtop with 290 V8

As the automobile marketplace in the U.S. was moving away from economy towards performance and luxury vehicles, American Motors began removing the historic Rambler name from its larger models. The American and Classic models retained their economy-car marketing image, and their traditional nameplate. To cement this image, a Rambler American was again the overall winner in the Mobil Economy Run. The mid-trim level 330 model was dropped, leaving the top 440 and base 220 models in the lineup for 1966. The top-of-the-line model, available only as a two-door hardtop, had its name changed from 440-H to Rogue.

The American models were facelifted for the 1966 model year, with more squared-off front and rear styling. The front of the car was extended three inches (76 mm), which allowed the optional air conditioning to be installed with the new 199 and 232 in-line six-cylinder engines, which were longer than the previous 195.6 versions.

A completely new 290 cu in (4.8 L) "Typhoon" V8 engine was developed by AMC; it was introduced in the special mid-1966 Rogue model. Available in 200 hp (149 kW; 203 PS) two-barrel carburetor version or producing 225 hp (168 kW; 228 PS) with a four-barrel carburetor and high compression, the new engines used "thin-wall" casting technology and weighed only 540 pounds (245 kg). The newly powered Rogue came with a three-speed automatic transmission or a floor-mounted four-speed manual, and made the car "suitable for the Stoplight Grand Prix." American Motors' new engine design would expand in power and applications across the company's passenger cars, and eventually in Jeeps. The engine continued to be assembled through 1991 for the Jeep Grand Wagoneer, long after AMC was sold to Chrysler in 1987.

=== 1967 ===
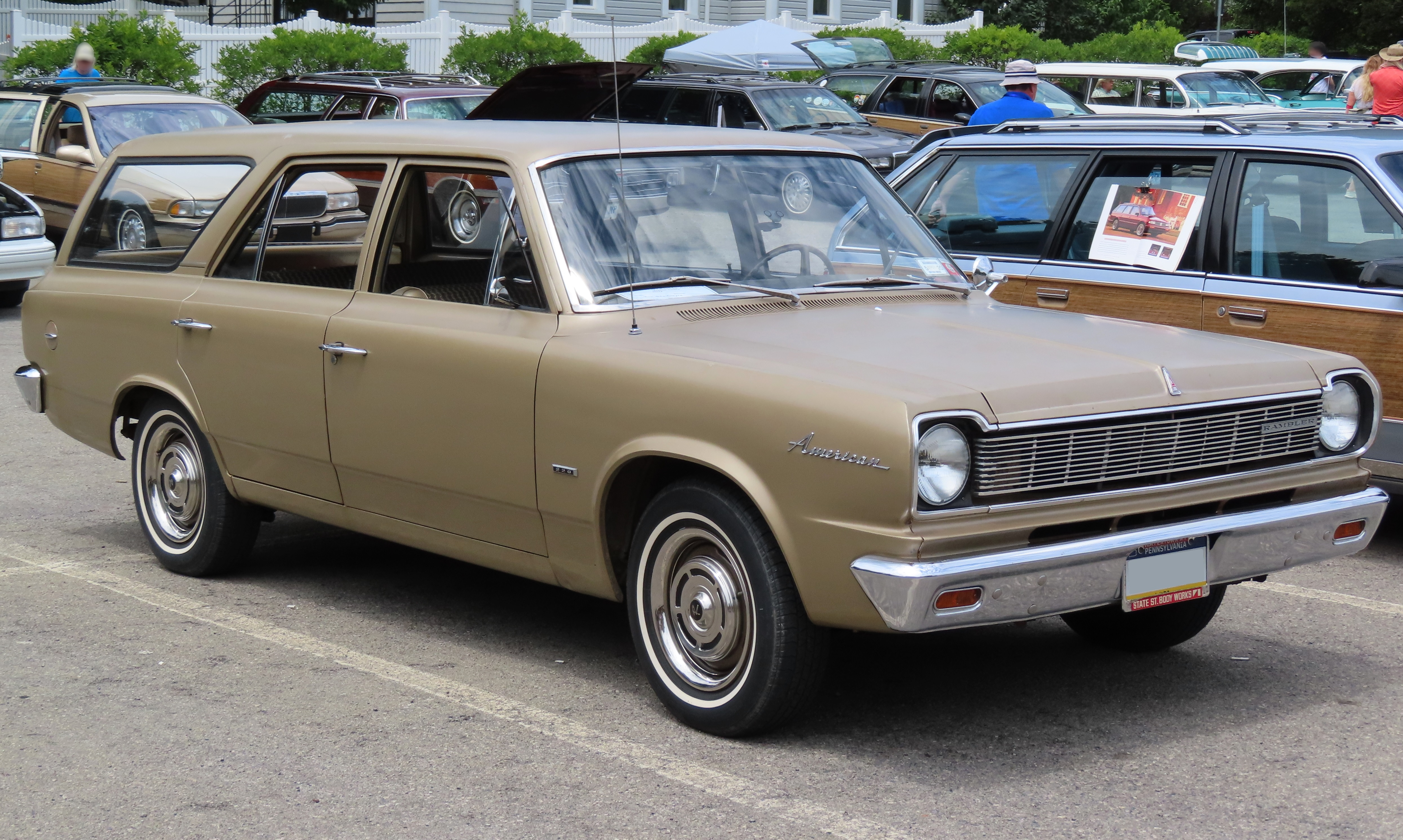
1967 Rambler American 220 wagon

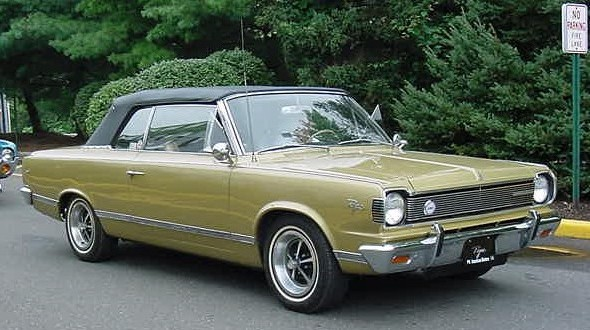
1967 Rambler American Rogue convertible

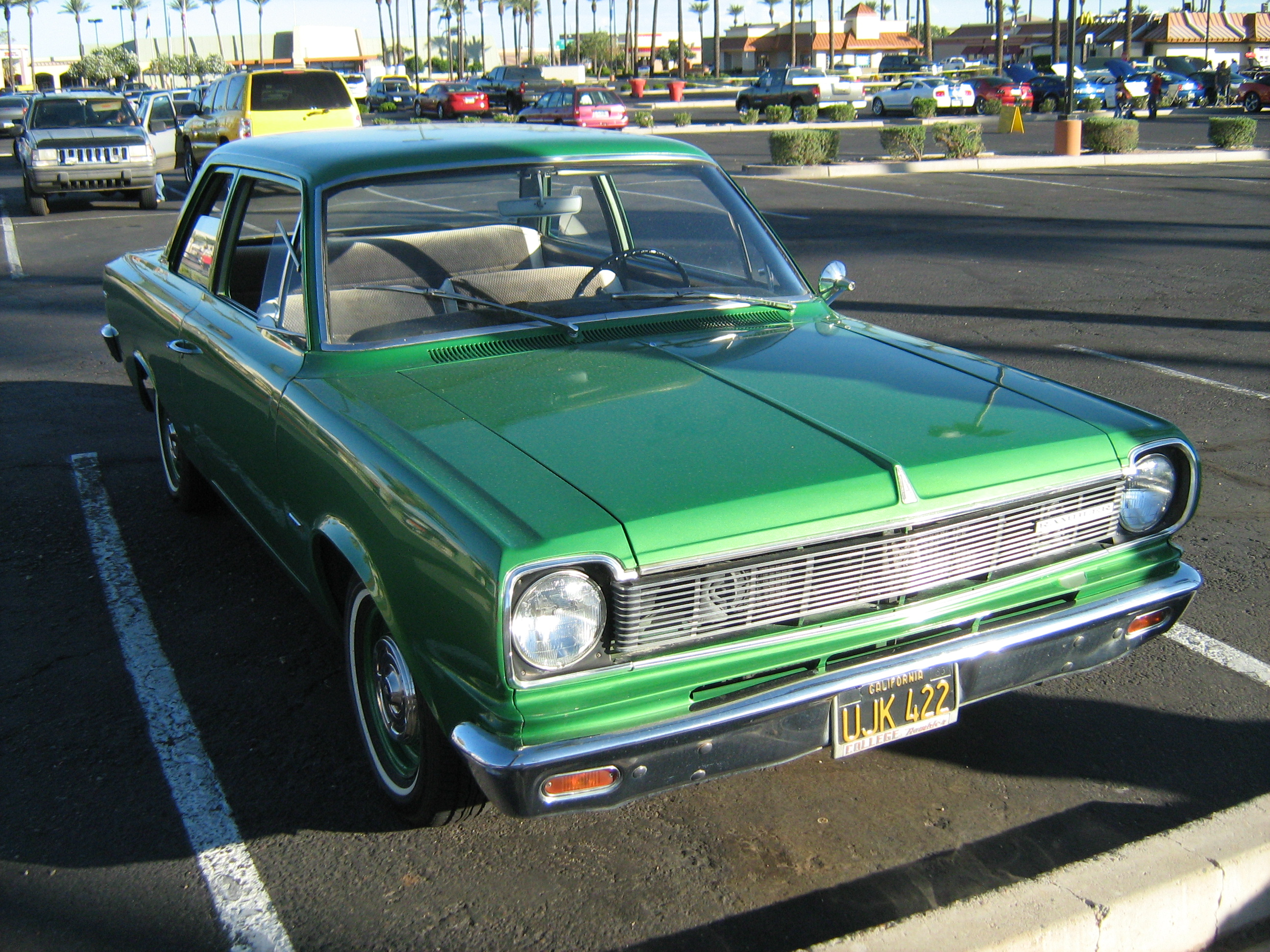
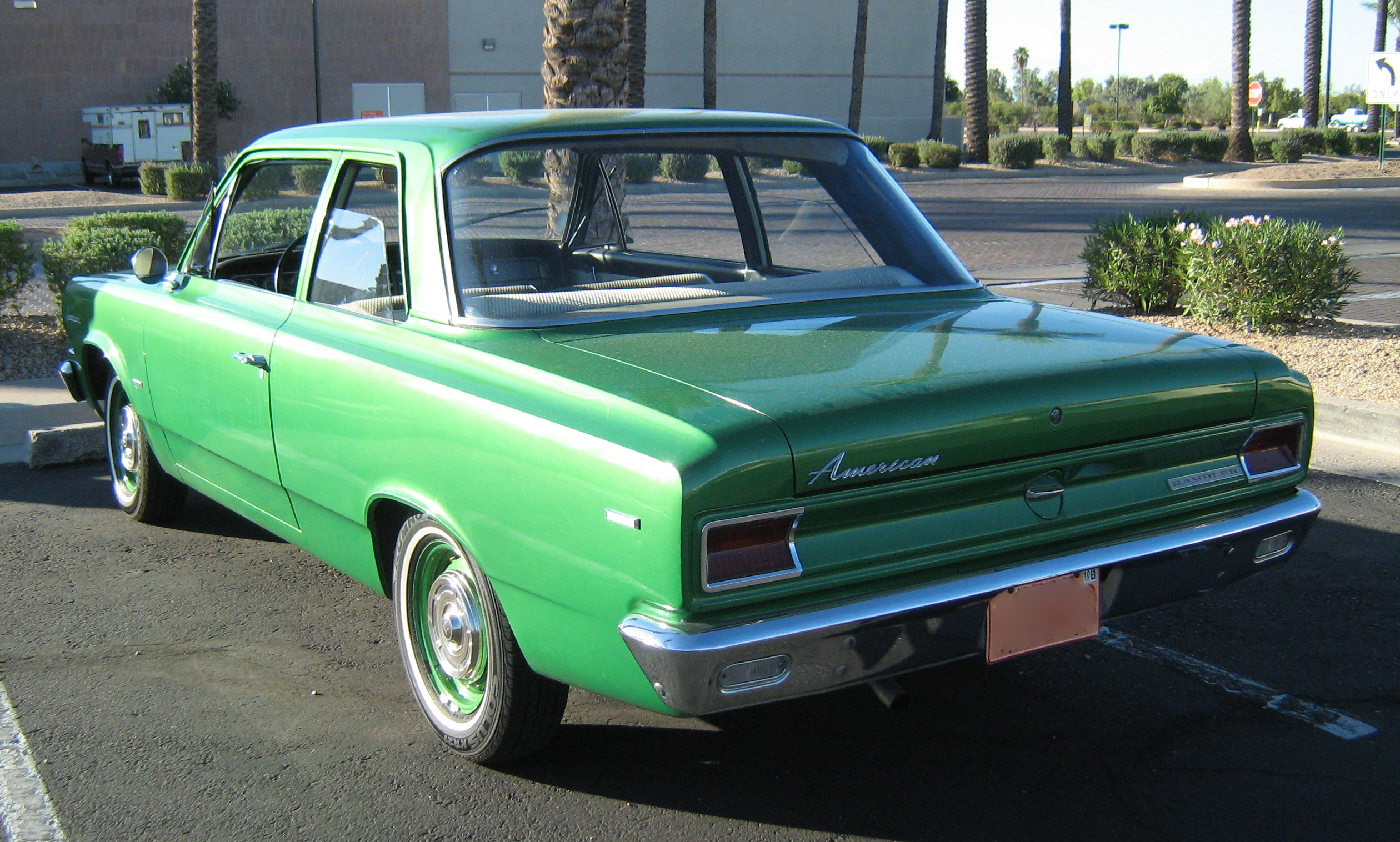
1967 Rambler American 220 two-door sedan

The 1967 model year Rambler American used the same body styling as the previous year's models, with only minor changes that included new taillamps and full-length body moldings on 440 and Rogue models that were now positioned lower on the sides. The last convertible available in the American series was in 1967, and it was moved up from 440 models to join the hardtop in the Rogue trim version. The American was available in nine models, and was the only U.S. compact to be available in "all" body styles (two-door, four-door, sedan, wagon, pillar-less hardtop, and convertible).

For the 1967 model year, AMC's new high-compression (10.2:1) 343 cu in (5.6 L) V8 engine with a four-barrel carburetor producing 280 hp (209 kW; 284 PS) and 365 lb⋅ft (495 N⋅m) of torque @ 3000 rpm was offered, but not widely advertised, in Rogue and 440 models. Factory installations of this engine were in 58 Rogues and 55 in the 440 models, with seven of them being in the convertible version. Only two Rogues and five 440s were bought by individuals; the others were made for AMC and mostly used for racing. Out of the total production of 69,912 Rambler Americans for the 1967 model year, 921 were Rogue convertibles.

Rogues also received grille trim that wrapped around the fender sides. All Rambler Americans received a new grille insert with prominent chromed horizontal bars. The 1967 Rogue models were available in new two-tone paint schemes for the roof, trunk lid, and hood that included border trim along the upper body line. The two-door hardtops were also available with a black or white vinyl roof cover. The previous rectangular taillight lenses were replaced with concave versions sculptured into the rear panel.

The 1967 model year also had the addition of the new safety standards for passenger cars mandated by the U.S. National Highway Traffic Safety Administration (NHTSA). The regulations called for two-point seat belts on all automobiles produced after 1 March 1967. All 1967 Rambler Americans included lap belts for all seating positions, a collapsible, energy-absorbing steering column and steering wheel, more padding on interior surfaces, four-way hazard flashers, and locking seat-back latches for two-door models. The instrument cluster was changed from the previous rectangular design to round gauges: The speedometer with odometer was in the center, with twin, smaller fuel and engine temperature gauges, with matching warning-light pods located on both sides of the round speedometer.

All 1967 Americans were covered by AMC's comprehensive warranty designed to increase customer confidence in their vehicles with the tagline "quality built in, so the value stays in". It was the strongest backing among all the automakers up to that time: two years or 25,000 miles (40,000 km) on the entire automobile and five years or 50,000 miles (80,000 km) on the engine and power train. American Motors continued its industry-exclusive ceramic-coated exhaust system as standard on Rambler Americans.

Newly appointed as AMC's new chairman and chief executive officer, Roy D. Chapin Jr. began to promote and reposition the Rambler American, the automaker's least popular line. He bet on the Rambler American to improve the automaker's financial performance after George W. Romney. Chapin also saw a price gap between U.S. cars and inexpensive imports (primarily the Volkswagen) and lowered the price to make the Rambler American's "total value superior to the imports, as well as superior in both price and range of choice to U.S. compacts". The suggested retail price of the base two-door Rambler American sedan dropped to US$1,839 (equivalent to $17,757 in 2025) (its closest U.S. competitor was the $2,117 Plymouth Valiant), making the larger and more powerful American only $200 more than the Volkswagen Beetle.

American Motors announced that it was forgoing the annual styling changeovers that were expected among the domestic firms, thus saving retooling costs and passing on the savings to consumers by keeping the car's price low. The automaker promised in a special $300,000 advertising campaign future changes to the car would be to enhance safety and reliability. The American's 1966 design was then continued mostly unchanged through the 1969 model year.

=== 1968 ===
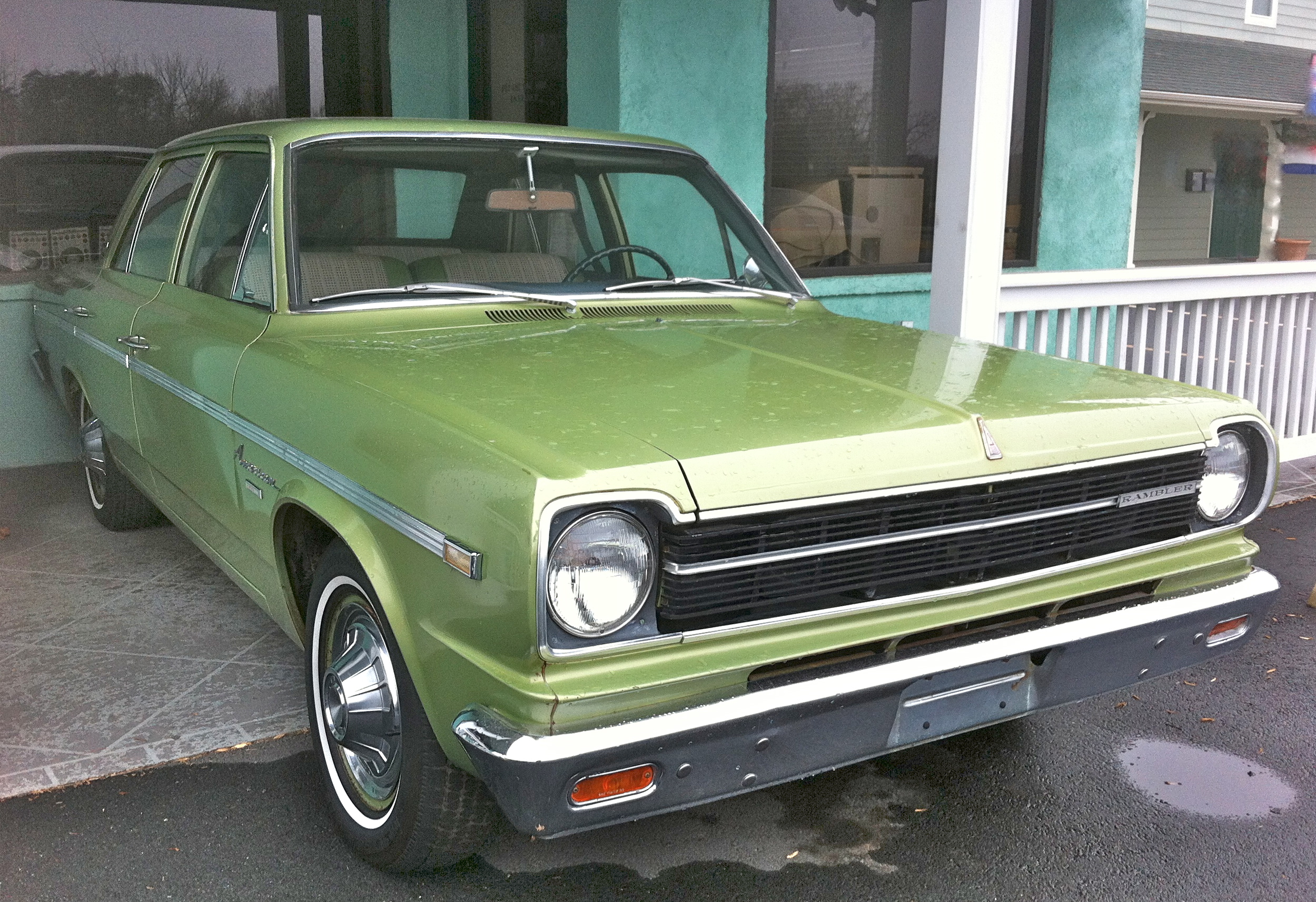
1968 Rambler American 440 four-door sedan

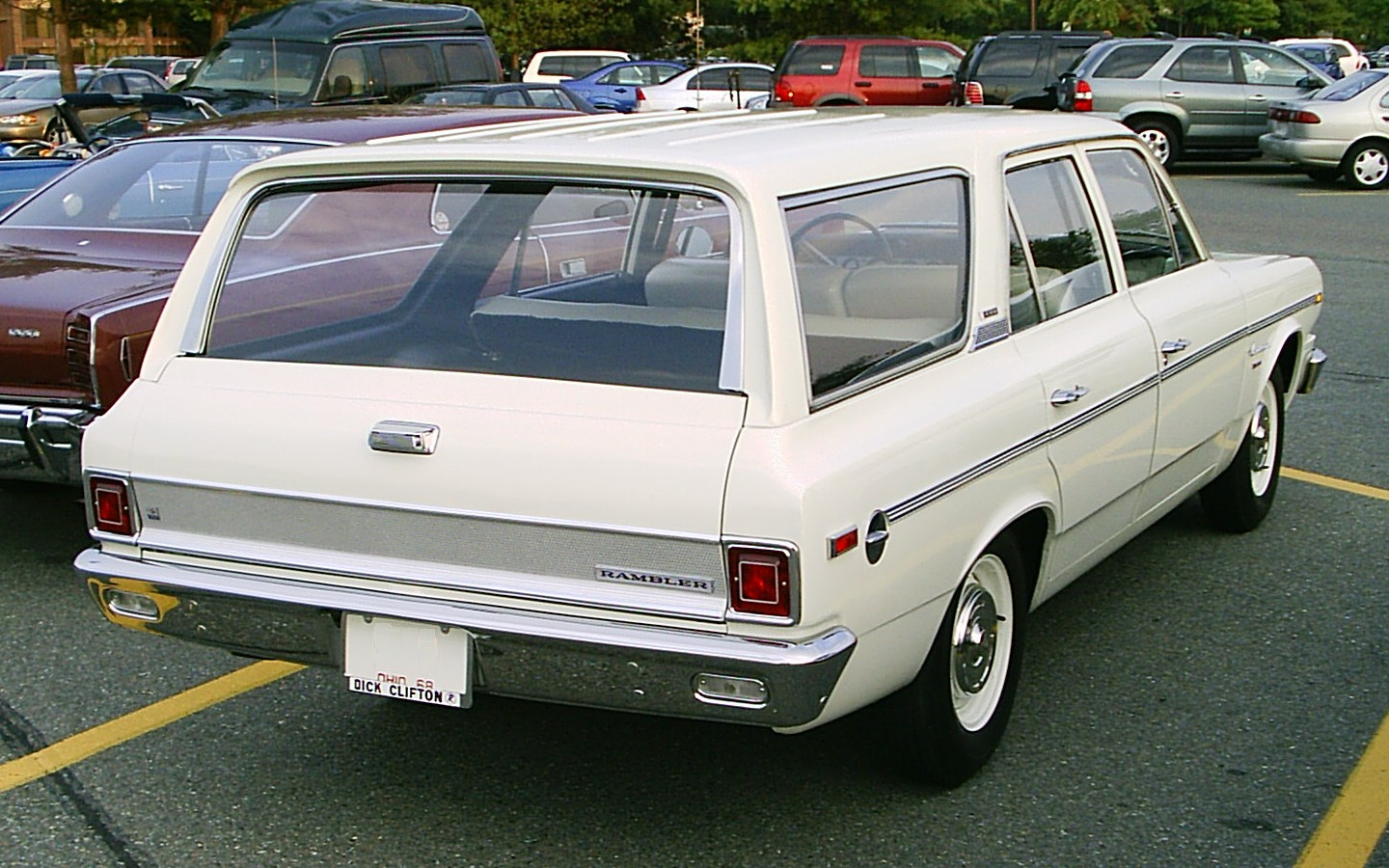
1968 Rambler American 440 station wagon

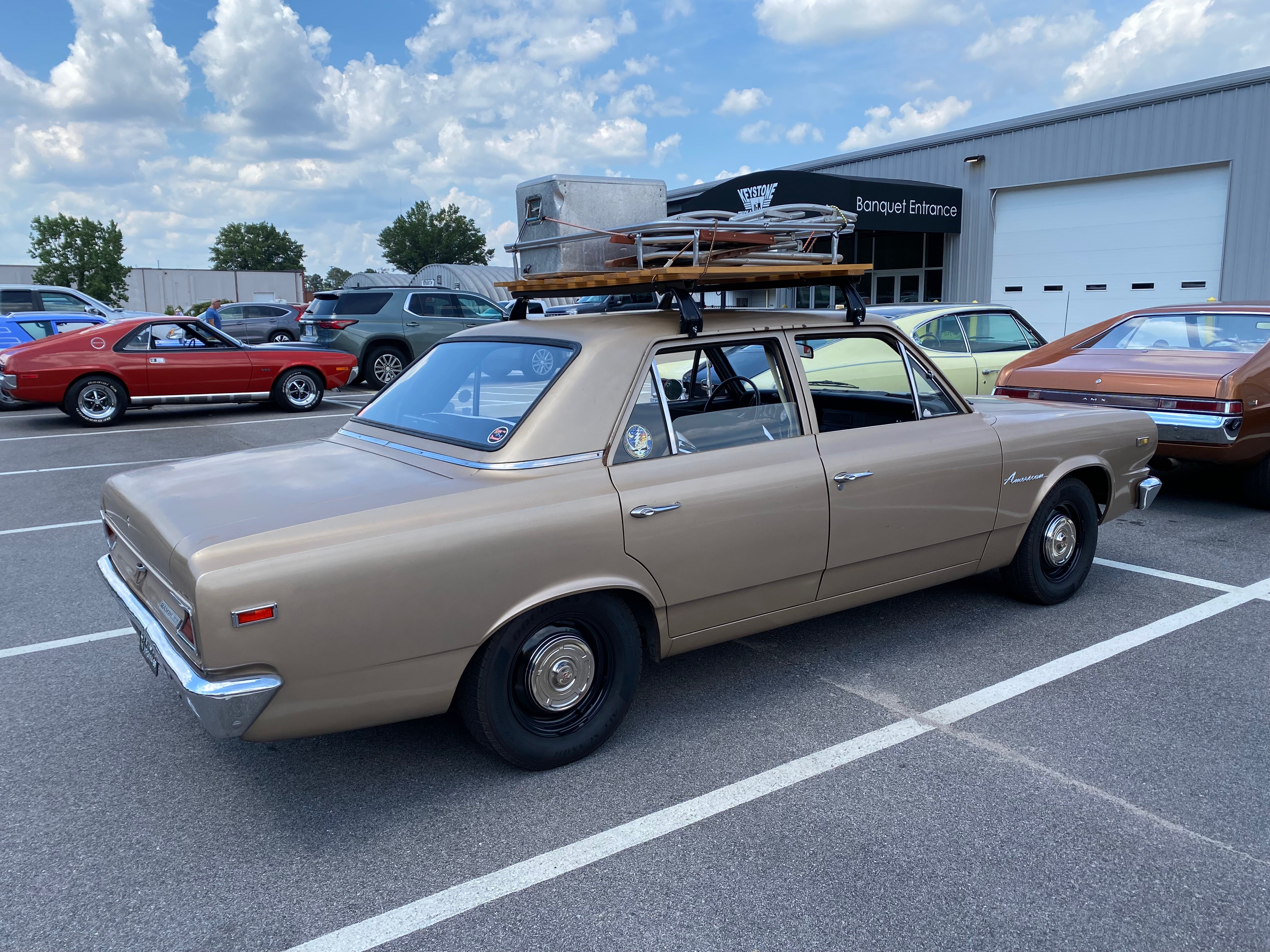
1968 Rambler American base four-door sedan with aftermarket luggage rack

For the 1968 model year, the Rambler American lineup underwent further simplification and strategic refinement, reducing its offerings from nine to five models. The streamlining aimed to sharpen the car's market focus. The base version, no longer carrying the "220" designation, included two- and four-door sedans. The mid-level "440" trim was available as a four-door sedan and a station wagon. Topping the range was the "Rogue" trim line, offered exclusively as a two-door hardtop. The American, alongside the Chrysler A platform vehicles (like the Plymouth Valiant and Dodge Dart) and the Chevrolet Corvair, were the only domestic compact cars available as a hardtop coupe, distinguishing them from competitors, the Ford Falcon and Chevrolet Nova, which were only offered as pillared sedans (and a wagon in the Falcon line).

The 1968 Rambler Americans received minor exterior changes. A new chrome horizontal grille bar was introduced, extending prominently outboard to meet the headlights, while the grille sections themselves were given a "blackout" treatment for a more modern appearance. A significant visual change for the sedans was modifying the wraparound rear window to a flatter unit, accompanied by a more squared-off "C" pillar. This alteration transformed the car's profile from the earlier sedans' overhanging rooflines to a more formal and contemporary look.

Up-level 440 and Rogue versions gained a distinctive stainless-steel trim that ran continuously along the body sides between the wheel wells and the beltline. Integrated into each end of this trim strip were the newly mandated safety features for 1968: amber body side reflectors for the front fenders and red for the rear. These were part of broader National Highway Traffic Safety Administration (NHTSA) standards for all passenger cars sold in America for 1968, which also mandated shoulder harnesses for the front seats and the elimination of reflective interior trim to reduce glare. Furthermore, all cars manufactured after January 1, 1968, had to include exhaust control systems to help minimize unburned hydrocarbon and carbon monoxide emissions, reflecting growing environmental concerns.

The most significant change for the 1968 Rambler American was AMC's bold pricing strategy. This was to keep the manufacturer's suggested retail price (MSRP) of the base two-door model within $200 of the Volkswagen Beetle's price, but offering more features. This aggressive pricing aimed to position the American as an undeniable value proposition in the compact car market. The domestic "Big Three" automakers did not respond to this direct pricing challenge, giving AMC a significant price differential over competing domestic models.

This strategy proved highly effective, leading to increased sales for the Rambler American and a notable boost in showroom traffic, which lifted morale among AMC's independent dealerships. The pricing offensive was supported by an audacious marketing campaign, crafted by AMC's new advertising agency, Wells, Rich, Greene, headed by the pioneering Mary Wells Lawrence. The advertisements declared, "Either we're charging too little for our cars or everyone else is charging too much," a direct and provocative challenge that openly violated the accepted industry rule of not directly attacking the competition. This promotion, combined with the lower prices, was designed to rekindle the Rambler American's image in consumers' minds as a practical, economical, and wise choice, directly appealing to value-conscious buyers.

=== 1969 ===
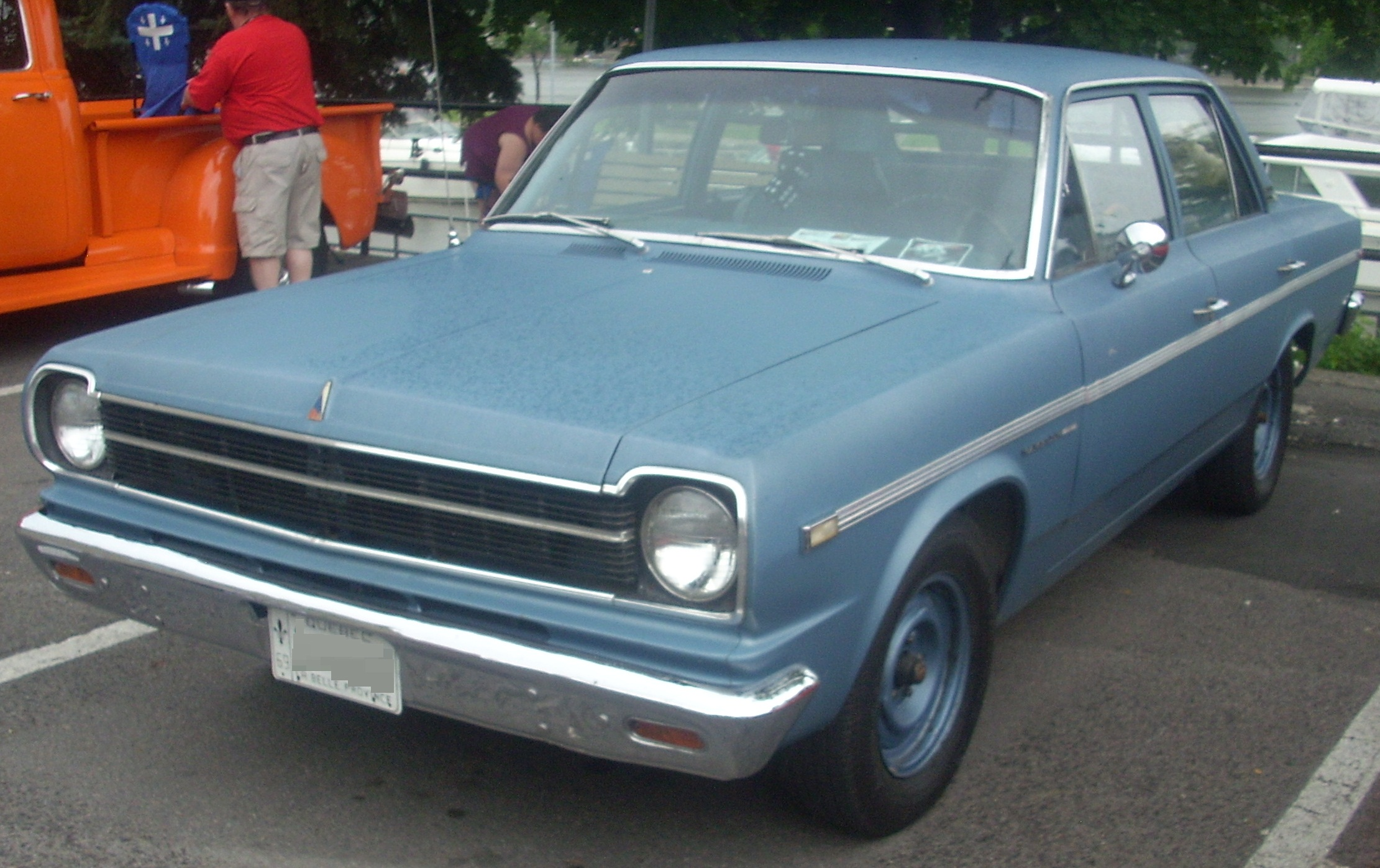
1969 Rambler sedan

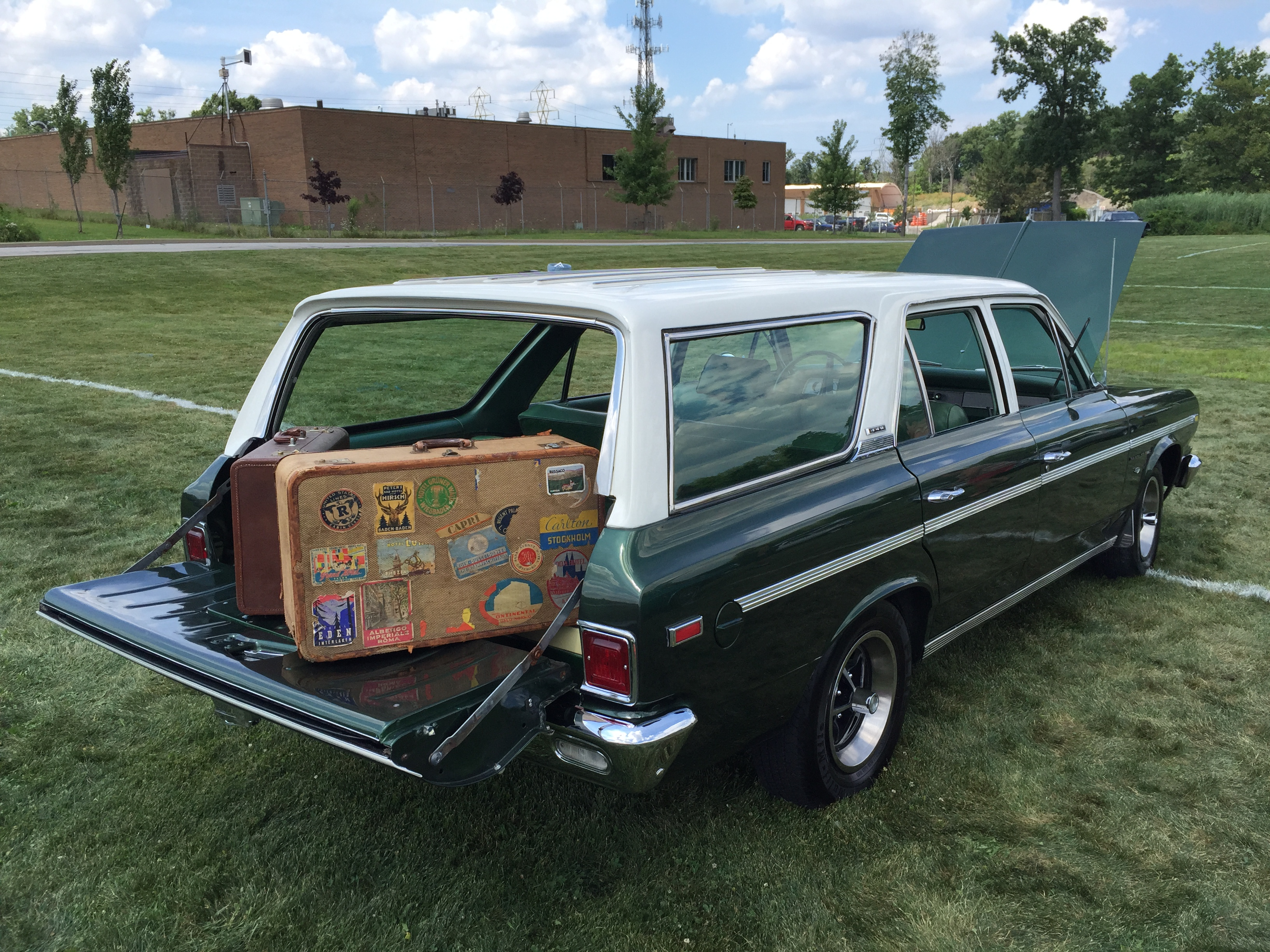
1969 Rambler 440 station wagon

Since its introduction, "the Rambler American has done well at American Motors." For its final model year, 1969, the "American" name was dropped as the car was now referred to as the "American Motors Rambler". Continuing the tradition of minimal changes, the models received a new "suspended" accelerator pedal and cable throttle linkage. Additional safety equipment for the 1969 models included front shoulder belts and headrests for both front outboard seating positions and the front parking lights stayed on with the headlights. On the exterior, the "Rambler" badge on the grille bar was deleted.

As a true compact-sized car on a 106 in (2,692 mm) wheelbase, the Rambler station wagon had no domestic competitors, and it offered interior space advantage compared to imported models with its 66 cubic feet (1,869 L) of cargo space. Available only in 440 trim, the wagons came with a roll-down rear window with drop-down tailgate for cargo area access, as well as a roof rack.

In part to commemorate the impending discontinuation of the Rambler name, American Motors added the Rogue-based SC/Rambler to the line (detailed separately).

Total production for the 1969 model year was 96,029. The last U.S.-made Rambler was assembled in Kenosha, Wisconsin, on 30 June, making the production total of 4,204,925 units.

After the 1969 model year, a completely redesigned model, the AMC Hornet, replaced the American.

== SC/Rambler ==
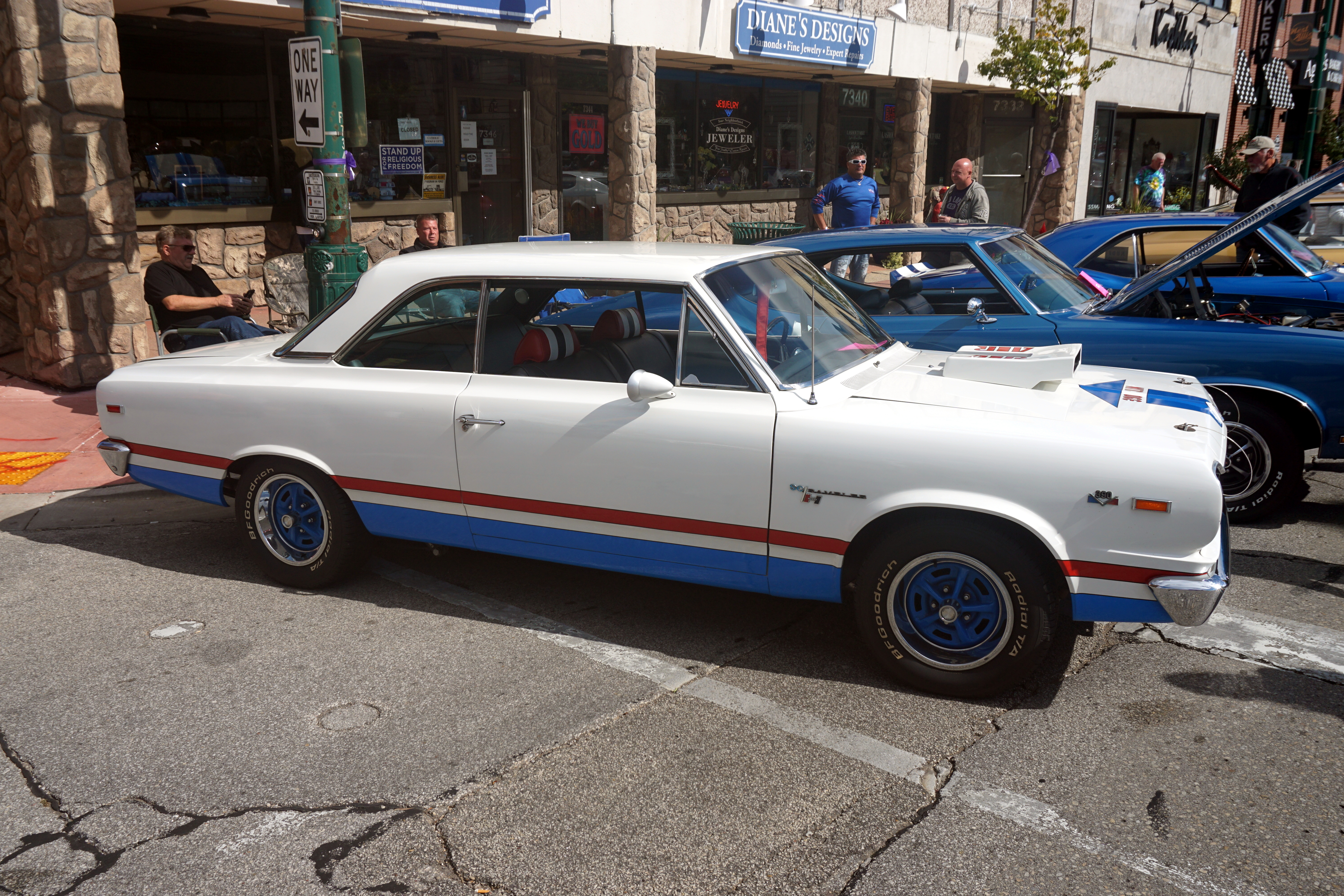
1969 SC/Rambler

One of the muscle-car era's "most visually arresting examples" was a special model that was produced during 1969 in collaboration with Hurst Performance, the Hurst SC/Rambler. The objective of AMC was more than to "just build these cars for the street and claim they performed – they took the cars racing." "Likely the most outrageous muscle car from AMC" with 1,512 built, it was probably the only production model made and promoted for a specific drag racing class, the National Hot Rod Association (NHRA) F/Stock class.

The SC/Rambler was a competent performer with quarter-mile times in the low 14-second range." A true muscle car with zero options and a suggested retail price of less than US$3,000 (equivalent to $26,338 in 2025), it would take down some much more vaunted cars. The marketing brochures suggested that owners check the current NHRA rule book as to racing classification and whether any modifications are allowed. As one of the most underrated muscle cars ever produced, most were used very much in racing with owners achieving the quarter-mile 12.07 seconds at 114 mph (183 km/h) in full street trim using street tires.

=== Equipment ===
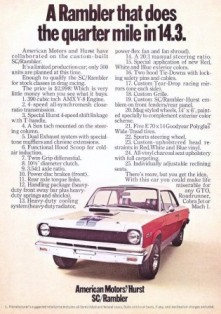
The SC/Rambler was purposefully promoted by AMC as a potent dragstrip challenger.

Each Hurst SC/Rambler came equipped with the 315 hp (235 kW; 319 PS) 390 cu in (6.4 L) AMC V8 engine from the AMX that translated into 10.03 pounds per horsepower. No factory options were available for this package. Standard clutch was a 10.5-inch (267 mm) with a three-finger, long-style Borg and Beck pressure plate. The 390 engine was mated to a four-speed manual BorgWarner T-10 with close gear ratios. A Hurst shifter came with a large metal "T" handle. The rear end was an AMC 3.54:1 "Twin-Grip" limited-slip differential using Dana internals, with outer wheel hubs attached through a spline and keyway system.

Factory cast-iron manifolds exited to a true dual exhaust with Thrush (a Tenneco brand) two-chamber oval mufflers with Woodpecker logos. These were baffled mufflers, not glasspacks. Minimal baffling gave a deep throaty sound, similar to modern Flowmasters. The exhaust exited through chrome tips attached with hose clamps.

While similar Rogue and American models had standard drum brakes, the SC package came with front discs, a heavier sway bar, and a strengthened drivetrain and body components. These included connectors between the front and rear subframes. The rear end used fore-and-aft staggered rear shock absorbers to eliminate wheel hop (axle wrap) under extreme acceleration conditions with leaf spring suspensions. The staggered shocks required a special plate riveted in the trunk pan, as well as brackets for the subframe end of upper torque links. Other body modifications differentiating Hurst SC Ramblers from regular hardtop Ramblers included rolled-back front and rear wheel openings to allow for larger tires. American Motors called on Hurst to help develop a vehicle for the racing market. Stock class rules required a minimum of 500 identical vehicles to be produced and sold. This led to the Hurst SC/Rambler, SC meaning "Super Car". This model is commonly referred to as a "Scrambler", although Jeeps later used the Scrambler name.

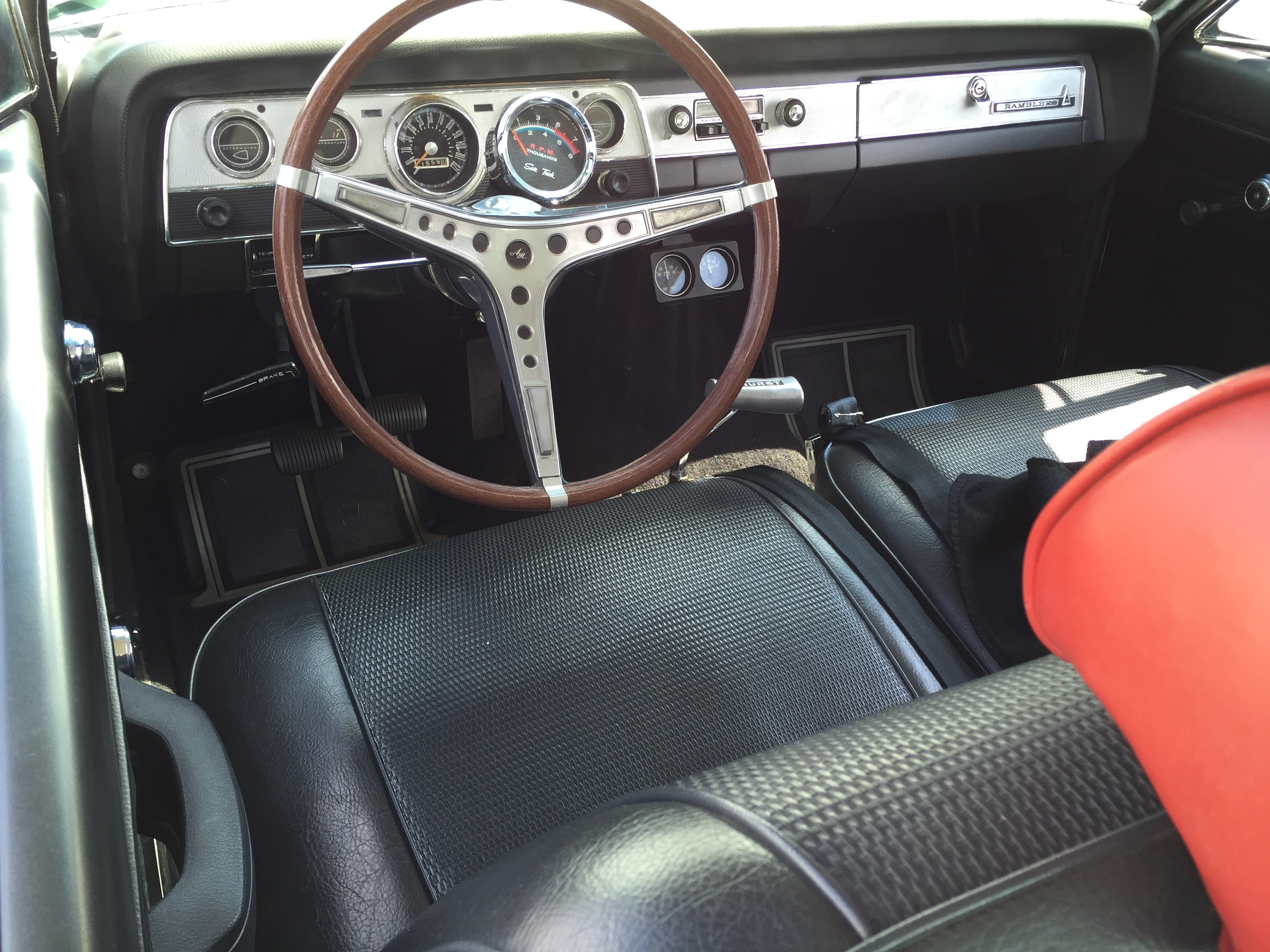
SC/Rambler interior

Available only as a two-door hardtop, the interior came in standard gray charcoal vinyl-upholstered reclining seats with a headliner embossed with small squares. The front seats reclined, and the new safety-mandated head restraints were upholstered in red, white, and blue stripes. The SC/Rambler included a standard 90-degree-arc dial Sun tachometer. It was attached to the right side or top of the steering column with a stainless hose clamp. The only factory option was an AM radio.

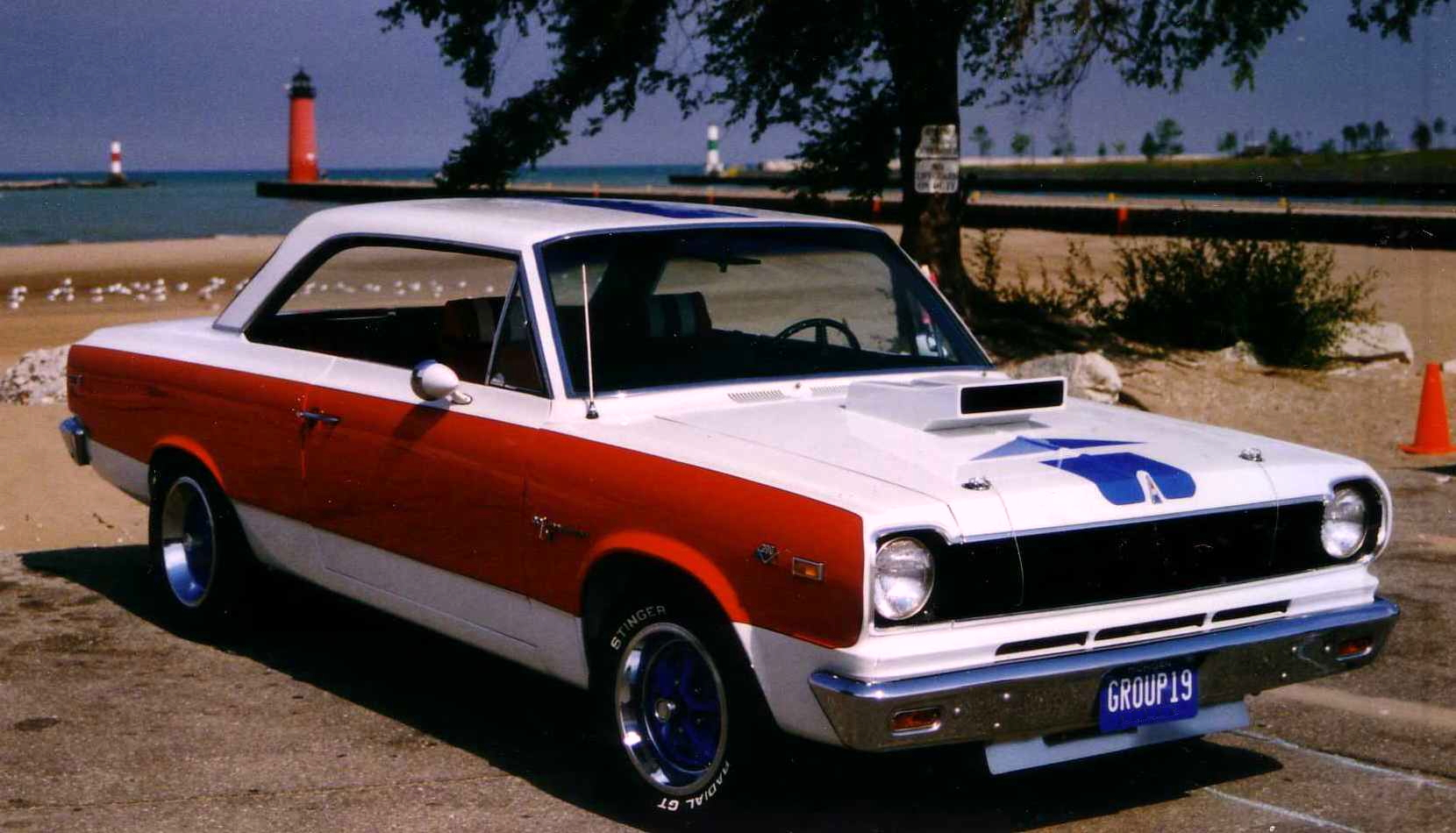
SC/Rambler in "A" trim

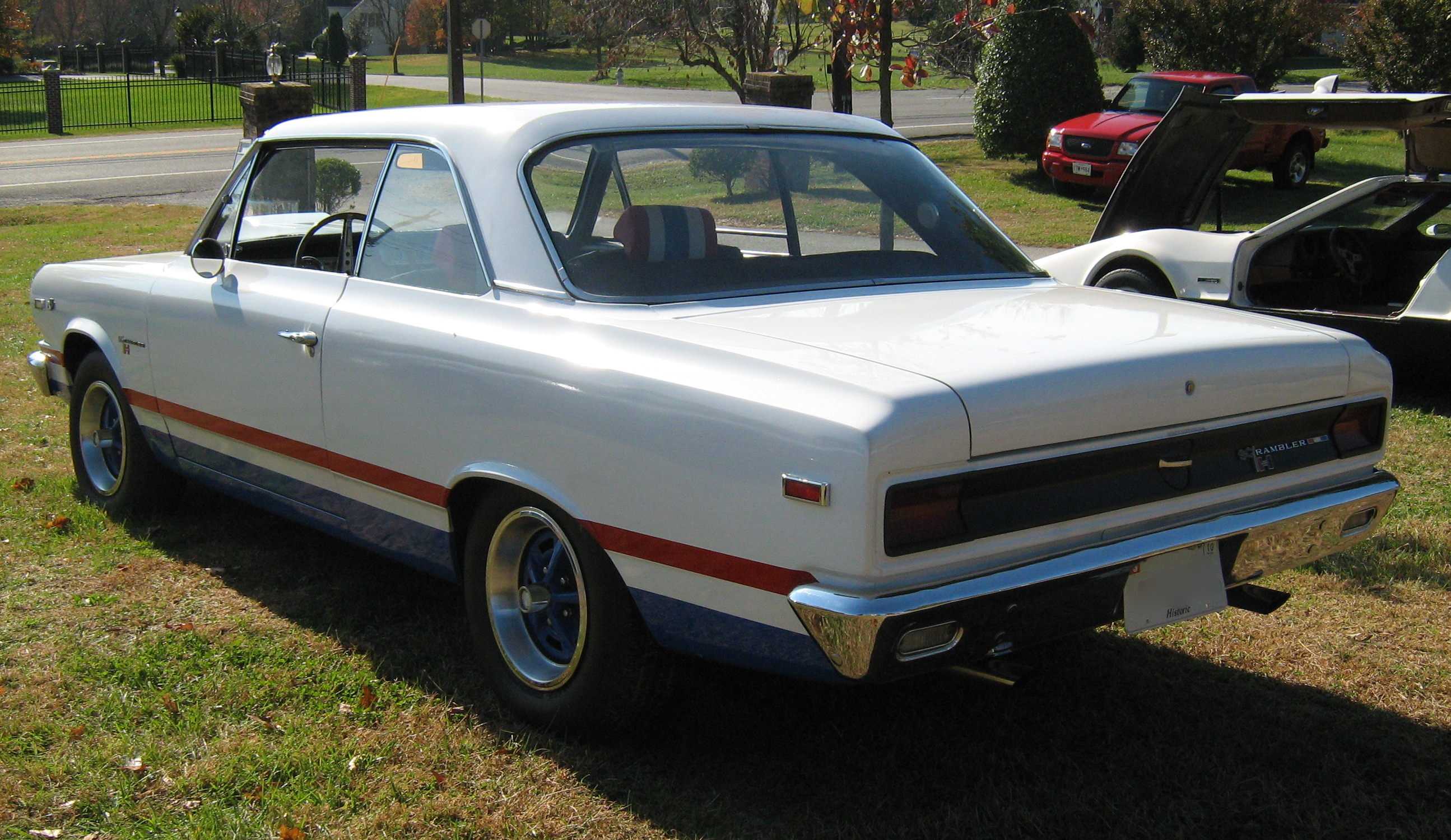
SC/Rambler in "B" trim

The SC/Ramblers came with wild factory paint jobs. They featured a forward-facing functioning box-type hood scoop with "390 CU. IN." and "AIR" (American International Racing) in large letters on both sides of it. The hood scoop air flapper was vacuum operated, allowing higher pressure cool air to pressurize a Carter AFB carburetor. A blue arrow on the hood pointed towards the air intake. The Scrambler came in only two red, white, and blue color schemes, "A" or "B". These schemes appeared randomly through early production.

Some AMC historians claim American Motors built a batch of 500 "A" scheme SC/Ramblers before switching to the "B" scheme, with 500 "B" models built before a switch to the final lot of 512 SC/Ramblers in "A" pattern. However, some "B" scheme cars in the Hurst SC/Rambler registry have very early build dates, putting their manufacture among the "A" scheme versions. AMC used the same paint codes for all special paint schemes, so it cannot be used to determine exactly how the 1512 cars rolled out of the factory. The paint codes “SPEC”, “SPECIAL”, “88A”, and "OOA" can appear with either the A scheme or B scheme. American Motors contracted Paul Hatton to paint the cars. He did 1,215 in the "A" scheme and that would mean a total of 297 "B" scheme SC/Ramblers.

Some of the other unique standard items on this model included racing mirrors, antihop rear axle links, and blue painted "Magnum 500" 14x6-inch styled steel wheels with chrome beauty rings and AMC hub centers. Tires were E-70-14 fiberglass-belted, four-ply tires with red-stripe Goodyear Polyglas tires. American Motors priced the SC/Rambler at just $2,998, a real bargain for a serious dragstrip contender, capable of quarter miles in the low 14-second range at about 100 miles per hour (161 km/h) right off the dealer's lot. For example, Road Test magazine reported 14.4 at 100.44 mph and reached 109 miles per hour (175 km/h) without topping out. With a few simple bolt-on modifications, they would run low 12s. Modified SC/Ramblers have run the quarter mile in the 9-second bracket.

The automaker provided AMC dealers with numerous "Group 19" parts and upgrades to make customer's SC/Ramblers even quicker. Well-tuned legal stock S/Cs with allowable changes have run in the 12-second range.

Charles Rauch set a D/S quarter-mile record of 12.54 seconds at Detroit Dragway. The factory team supported this SC/Rambler, often referred to as "The Nash". Modifications included a special cast-iron manifold, advanced camshaft timing, heavier valve springs, factory-supplied carburetor, six-cylinder front springs with factory-supplied bottom shims to restore stock height, 90/10 front shocks, lightened chassis components, exhaust-system modifications, Chevrolet 10.5-inch diaphragm pressure plate, wide-ratio transmission gear set, 4.44 rear-axle ratio, and larger, softer, G70-15 rear tires on identical-design "Magnum 500" 15-inch Ford wheels painted AMC blue. The manifold and some other parts were specially selected factory components for the stock 340 hp (254 kW; 345 PS) 1970 Rebel Machine engine, but legal for use in the big-bore, short-stroke 1969 AMC 390 engine.

== International production ==
The compact Rambler American was exported from the U.S. and Canada and produced in other markets by AMC subsidiaries or assembled under license. It was manufactured in Australia, Iran, Mexico, Argentina, and South Africa. The Rambler American was also shipped in CKD from the U.S. and assembled at the Haren factory in Belgium to be sold as the "Renault Rambler" in France, Belgium, Luxembourg, the Netherlands and Austria, starting with the 1962 model.

=== Argentina ===
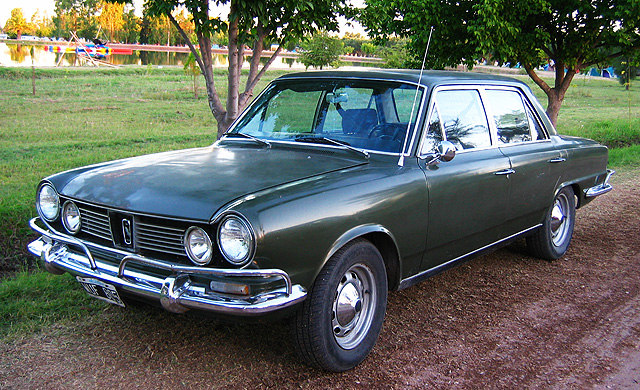
IKA Torino TS sedan

Industrias Kaiser Argentina (IKA) produced a hybrid of the second-generation Rambler American and Classic platforms in Argentina from 1966 through 1982. The compact car was named IKA Torino, later Renault Torino. It featured AMC's automobile platform with a facelifted front and rear design and instrument panel by Pininfarina to create a new car. The Torino was received by journalists and the public as the Argentinean car. It was available in two-door hardtop and four-door sedan body styles, and all came with luxurious interior appointments.

The Torino's engine, transmission, and upgraded interior fittings were unique to Argentina and were not used on any of the U.S.-market Ramblers. The engine was the Tornado Interceptor 230 cu in (3.8 L) overhead cam (OHC) six originally developed for the new 1963 Jeeps. The car was actually a 1963-1964 Rambler Classic passenger compartment with 1964-1965 Rambler American front and rear sections. The front suspension sills extended all the way under the floor to meet the rear suspension sills, a feature that made the Torino much stiffer than its U.S.-produced equivalents (The Rambler Marlin also used these long sills, but other models did not). The Torino handled the roads of the interior of the country very well, while its engine acquired fame for being robust and reliable. The car was successful in Argentina. It was also entered in races against famous sports cars, including the "84 hours of Nürburgring" endurance race in 1969, where a Torino finished with the most laps, but was classified in fourth place due to penalties.

=== Australia ===
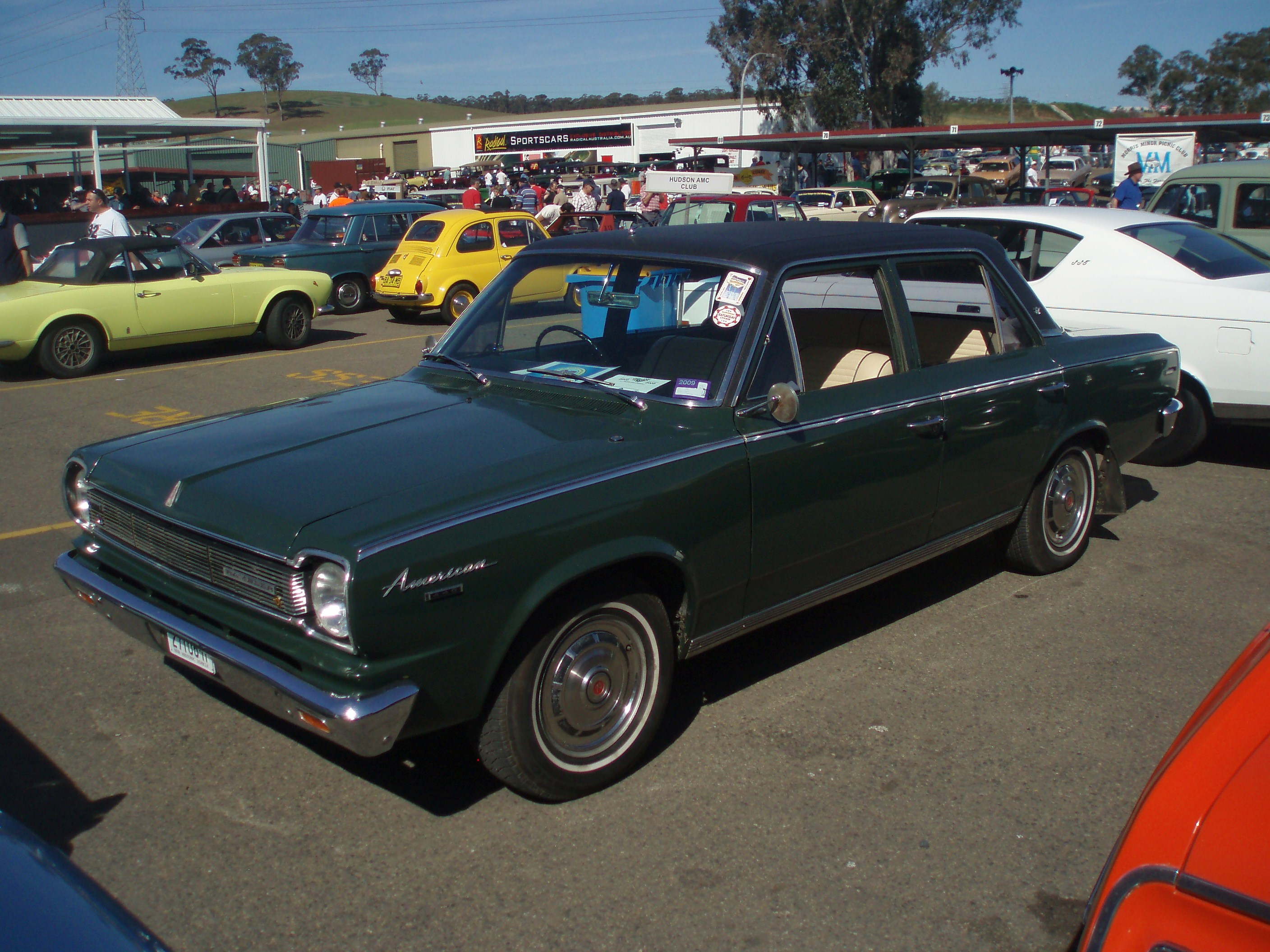
1966 Rambler American 440 (Australia)

The Rambler American was introduced to the Australian market in 1964. It was built by Australian Motor Industries (AMI) in Port Melbourne from semiknock-down kits shipped from the U.S. The kits were received in right-hand drive and were assembled with a percentage of local content as required by Australian law to gain tariff concessions. Also differences and overlaps existed in the Australian production and equipment compared to U.S. model years. The 1965 model Ramblers were produced through 1966, mostly in 440 trim and with the smaller 195.6 cu in (3.205 L) engine. Because AMI assembled other automobile brands at its facility (including Toyotas and Triumphs), some sharing of colors, options, and interior trims occurred. By 1967, the local content of the Rambler Americans had been progressively raised to 53%. Importantly for the Australian market, the Rambler was considered reliable, with the mechanicals being generally solid and trouble-free. AMI stopped assembling the American in 1967.

AMI distributed Ramblers from Melbourne for the state of Victoria. Grenville Motors in Sydney distributed vehicles for New South Wales. Betterview Pty Ltd in Canberra distributed vehicles for Australian Capital Territory. Annand & Thompson Pty Ltd in Brisbane distributed vehicles for Queensland. Champions Pty Ltd in Adelaide distributed vehicles for South Australia. Premier Motors Pty Ltd in Perth distributed Ramblers for Western Australia, and Heathco Motors in Launceston distributed Rambler vehicles for Tasmania.

=== Finland ===
Rambler vehicles were imported into Finland during the 1950s and 1960s by two major Finnish automotive importers, Oy Voimavaunu Ab and Suomen Maanviljelijäin Kauppa Oy (SMK Group.) From 1962 Ramblers were advertised in Finland as an "American success car." From the mid-1960s, Wihuri Group, a large multi-sector family business, took over import operations using its shipping operation, Autola Oy. Along with the Rambler Classic, the Rambler American was popular as a taxi cab. Autola Oy continued to import AMC vehicles until 1975.

=== Iran ===
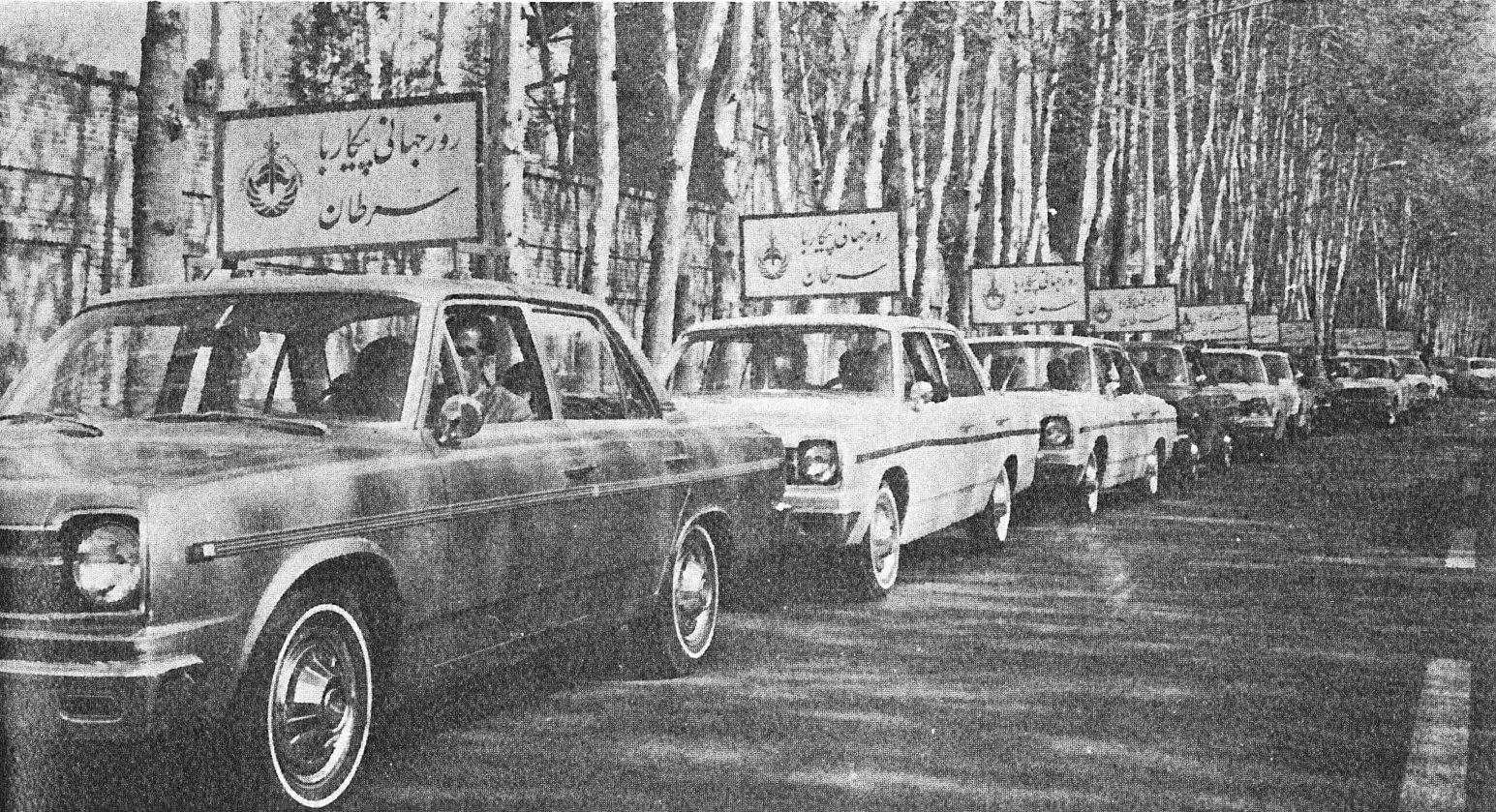
Sherkate Sahami Jeep company built Ramblers in Iran. These cars used the 1966 American four-door body, but feature 1968-model trim, including the blackout grille and U.S.-type side marker lights.

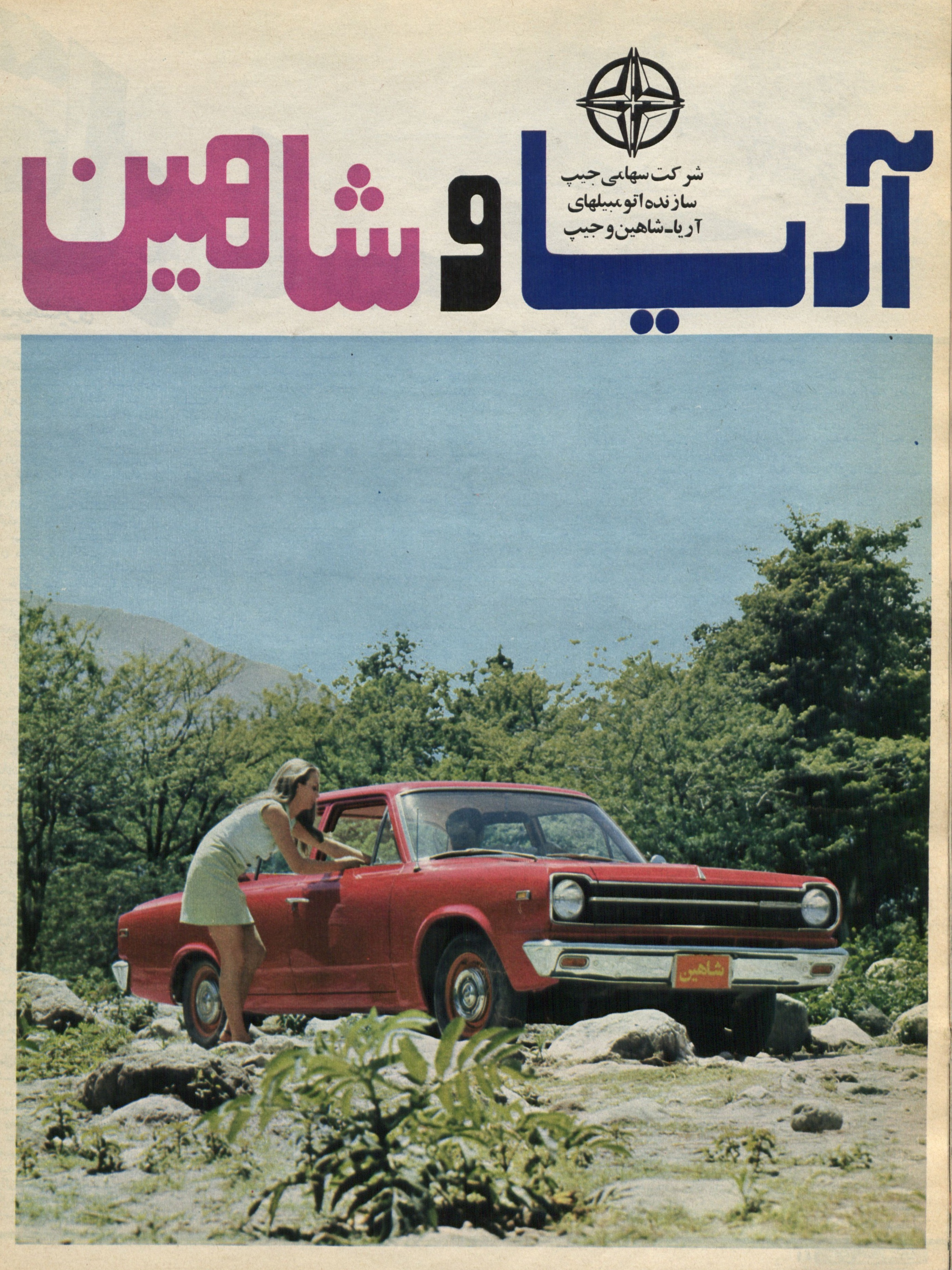
Aria and Shahin advertisement (Iran)

From 1967 through 1974, the 1966 version of the AMC Rambler American was assembled by the Sherkate Sahami Jeep company in Iran. The American was offered in two trim levels as Aria (sometimes spelled "Arya") and Shahin. Aria means "Aryan", and Shahin "Falcon". The Aria was a more luxurious version that came with a three-speed automatic, as well as manual transmission, while the Shahin was the base model with a manual transmission. The engine used was AMC's 195.6 cu in (3.2 L) I6 producing 128 hp (95 kW; 130 PS). The cars were available with factory air conditioning, a unique feature for the Iranian market during that time.

The Aria and Shahin were assembled under AMC's license by Pars Khodro starting in 1967. The factory in Tehran was dedicated by the last Shah of Iran. Five-year projections called for the Pars Khodro plant to build 75,000 Rambler Americans. The target was the upper and middle classes that had grown prosperous under the Shah. The Arya and Shahin versions of the Rambler American, as well as the Jeep Aho (Grand Wagoneer), "were among the best domestically produced vehicles."

Production continued by the Iran Jeep Company in a Tehran factory. Iran Jeep (Sherkate Sahami) had been cooperating with General Motors for over 15 years and in June 1972 purchased enough shares to change the name to General Motors Iran. Production of Rambler Americans ended in early 1974, but assembly of some Opel Rekord, Chevrolet Nova and Pickup, Buick Skylark, and Cadillac Seville models from 1974 until 1987. Much later, Aria and Shahin nameplates use on Saipa Aria crossover and Saipa Shahin sedan.

=== Mexico ===
The Rambler American was introduced to the Mexican market in 1958 through direct importation from the U.S. Looking to replace importation with local assembly, American Motors, early in the year, signed an agreement with Planta REO, an assembly plant based in Monterrey, Nuevo León, that produced several models for different makes and had its own dealership network. The entire Rambler line was available, but production and sales volumes were low, and the agreement was terminated in late 1959. American Motors resumed importing its products into the country until a new partner was found. Early in 1960, the company signed a new agreement with Willys Mexicana S.A. de C.V., and the first model produced was none other than the Rambler American, becoming the first American Motors product made and sold by the company that would become Vehículos Automotores Mexicanos S.A. (VAM) in 1963.

The 1960 Rambler American produced under Willys Mexicana was available in two-door sedan, four-door sedan, and two-door station wagon body styles. They were powered by a 90 hp (67 kW; 91 PS) L-head 195.6 cu in (3.2 L) I6 with 8.0:1 compression ratio and single-barrel carburetor coupled to a three-speed manual transmission with column shift. It featured built-in flow-through ventilation, four-wheel drum brakes, manual steering, pull-handle parking brake, bench seats, four armrests, vacuum wipers, cigarette lighter, front ashtray, hood ornament, glove box, driver's-side remote mirror, and hubcaps over standard steel wheels. Among the factory options were the one-barrel OHV version of the 195.6 engine and an automatic transmission.

For 1961, the Rambler American for Mexico was available as the new second generation of the line, growing from three to four body styles with the introduction of the four-door station wagon. Wipers and washers changed to electric units, a Motorola AM radio with an antenna, and twin-circuit brakes became standard.

The line continued with minor cosmetic changes for the 1962 model year. The Mexican automobile industry integration decree was also issued in 1962 by the government of President Adolfo López Mateos. Among its statutes was a ban on fully finished vehicle imports and called for a reduction of body styles and engines, as well as a new requirement of a minimum of 60% of components and equipment to be produced locally. Automakers responded by reducing the number of car lines, trim levels, options, and variants in all product lines, Willys Mexicana being no exception. Some equipment became unavailable or was restricted to special low-volume production models. Rambler Americans were no longer available with an automatic transmission, being restricted to a three-speed manual from 1962.

In 1963, Willys Mexicana was reorganized as a new company, Vehículos Automotores Mexicanos (VAM), with direct investments from American Motors, Kaiser-Willys, and the Mexican government. A fifth body style, a two-door hardtop, was introduced. Known as the Rambler American Hardtop, it was the Mexican equivalent of the Rambler American 440H model marketed in the U.S. and Canada. This made the 1963 Rambler American line the broadest in VAM history, lacking only a convertible. The car became VAM's first sporty compact, its first high-end luxury model (even above the also-new regular-production Rambler Classic), and its first limited edition. A feature was the standard 138 hp (103 kW; 140 PS) 195.6 cu in (3.2 L) I6 with a two-barrel carburetor and OHV configuration. A total of 90 units of this version were made.

For 1964, the third-generation Rambler American debuted in Mexico and was available as two- and four-door sedans as well as a four-door station wagon. Initial cars were fitted with the L-head 90 hp (67 kW; 91 PS) 195.6 cu in (3.2 L) I6 as in the previous four years, but replaced by the one-barrel 127 hp (95 kW; 129 PS) OHV version as standard equipment early in the year. A two-barrel version of this engine became an option. The only transmission available was still the three-speed manual with a steering-column-mounted shifter across all body styles.

VAM's engine plant was inaugurated in November 1964, fulfilling another requirement of the 1962 decree. Domestically made en engines were introduced in 1965 model year VAM cars. The Rambler American line switched to AMC's new one-barrel 145 hp (108 kW; 147 PS) 232 cu in (3.8 L) I6 as the standard engine. At midyear, it was also replaced by the new 199 cu in (3.3 L) version that became available then. The reason for this was that the 232 engine series was already being produced in Mexico, while both versions of the 195.6 engine were imported from the U.S. To achieve consolidation and standardized production, the 195.6 engine was dropped, and both the Rambler Classic and Rambler American lines came with the 232 engine until the 199 became available for the latter. The VAM Rambler American had the same design features as its AMC counterpart, including a partially redesigned grille with four vertical lines and new taillights with a flat inner side and a curved outer side.

Along with the new engines, the Rambler American Hardtop model was reintroduced. It featured the same luxury and sporty touches as the original 1963 model, alongside new ones, and was once again a low-volume, limited-edition model. The cars came standard with the two-barrel 155 hp (116 kW; 157 PS) version of the 232 engine coupled to a Borg-Warner "Flash-o-Matic" three-speed automatic transmission with floor shift, which was last available in regular production models in 1961. Other standards included a luxury steering wheel, individually adjustable and reclining front seats, high-trim upholstery, a center console with a locking compartment, custom wheel covers, a full bright molding package (including 440H emblems), and an under-dash tissue holder. Options included seat belts, power steering, power brakes, and a heater. A total of 320 top-of-the-line models were produced.

The 1966 VAM Rambler American received similar design changes to its U.S. counterparts, including more squared exterior lines, squared headlight bezels, and redesigned taillights. A padded dashboard surround for safety was now standard, as was the updated instrument cluster with a horizontal speedometer. The hardtop model was dropped and the line was restricted to the 199 cu in (3.3 L) I6 engine with a column shifted three-speed manual transmission.

The 1967 models received a new semi-concave, squared taillight design, and a new five-dial instrument cluster with a round speedometer at the center. A fully synchronized 150-T model three-speed manual transmission was now standard equipment, meaning the end of non-synchromesh units in VAM cars. The new transmission was joined by a 3.73:1 rear differential gear ratio. Hazard lights were added to the standard equipment list.

The 1968 model changes were in the form of the 232 cu in (3.8 L) engine as standard equipment in the station wagon, while becoming optional equipment in both of the sedan models. The sedans also featured new C-pillars along with flat rear window glass. The interiors included new larger side armrests. Front two-point seatbelts became standard for the first time. The rear differential was changed to a 3.54:1 gear ratio.

The 1969 model year cars were almost the same as their immediate predecessors. VAM developed a performance model, the Rambler American Rally, that consisted of an optional package for the two-door sedan. It was inspired by VAM's successful 1965 racing season using Rambler American sedans and hardtops, as well as growing domestic market demand for muscle and performance cars. The package included a two-barrel 155 hp (116 kW; 157 PS) 232 cu in (3.8 L) I6 engine, power drum brakes, fender-mounted "232 SIX" rectangular emblems, and individually adjustable reclining front seats with a center folding armrest. The transmission was still the three-speed manual with a column-mounted shifter with a floor-mounted gearshift as a dealership option. Other dealership options included front disc brakes, a front sway bar, stiffer shock absorbers, and a Hurst-linked four-speed manual transmission. Factory options included a dash-mounted 8,000 rpm tachometer and the sport steering wheel used in the Javelin models.

The Rambler American line was discontinued in 1969 to make way for the all-new AMC Hornet models. Unlike in the U.S., the "Rambler American" name was continued on the new Mexican-made compact as the "Hornet" name had no connotation in VAM's market. The Rambler maintained a highly positive image among Mexican buyers. Because the 1970 model year Hornet line did not include a station-wagon body style (AMC had the larger-sized Rebel wagon for the U.S. market) the VAM Rambler American four-door station wagon was carried over for one more year. The 1970 VAM Camioneta Rambler American became available with a three-speed automatic transmission as a regular-production option - a feature last seen on the 1968 VAM Javelin since automatics were last available in 1961. An optional bright molding package included "440" emblems, though no other trim levels or versions were offered.

The Hornet-based Rambler American model continued as a "fourth generation" until it was replaced with an updated and expanded new VAM American line for 1975.

=== Norway ===
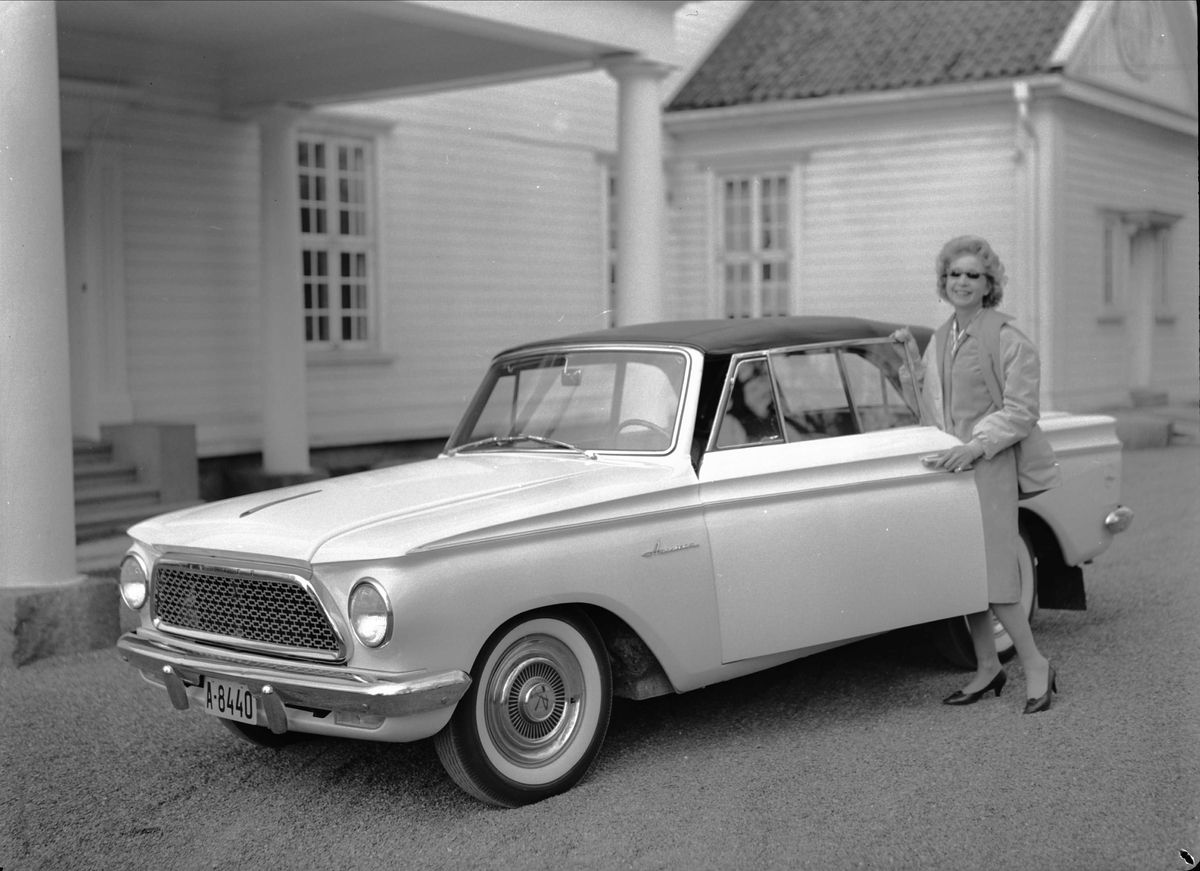
Rambler American photo on display at the Oslo Museum, Norway

Ramblers were imported into Norway during the 1950s and 1960s by Norwegian importer Kolberg & Caspary (K&C) located at Ås, Norway. Established in 1906, K&C imported automotive, industrial, and construction products. The Rambler American was imported from 1963 until 1969, peaking in 1965. A total of 260 cars were brought in to Norway by production end. K&C also imported the Rambler Ambassador, Classic, and Rebel.

=== Peru ===
Ramblers were assembled in Peru by Rambler Del Peru and sold throughout the country by a network of 13 dealers.

=== Philippines ===
While the Philippines was almost exclusively an American car market until 1941, the post-World War II years had an influx of European cars. Despite a saturation of international brands, American Motors Corporation established a presence, and the Rambler Classic and Rambler American were locally assembled by Luzon Machineries in Manila during the 1960s. Because of its because of their rugged construction and the relatively powerful 232 cubic inch I6 engine, Rambler Americans quickly became the favorite of the Manila Police Department.

=== South Africa ===
National Motor Assemblers (NMA), in Natalspruit (Gauteng) was established in the 1920s, and assembled numerous automobile marques, including Hudson. It began production of Rambler Americans in 1961. The Rambler American was available in four-door sedan, station wagon, and two-door hardtop body styles. The operation was sold to the Rootes Group in 1964 and thereafter assembled Hillman, Humber, and Sunbeam, alongside Peugeot and Rambler.

The American sedan was marketed as the "Rambler Rogue" and the station wagon was marketed as the "Rambler 440 Super Stationwagon".

Rambler assembly at NMA ceased in 1967 after Chrysler in the U.S. acquired Rootes Group. Between January 1968 and January 1969, Rambler production was moved to the Datsun assembly plant, Rosslyn Motor Assemblers.The American sedan was marketed as the "Rambler Rogue" and the station wagon was marketed as the "Rambler 440 Super Stationwagon".

In 1969, Rambler production was moved to the former GM plant, Motor Assemblies Limited in Durban, which had come under the control of Toyota South Africa in 1964. Production continued through 1970. The Rambler American was replaced by the locally assembled AMC Hornet and marketed as the "Rambler Hornet".

South African assembly of Rambler Americans included 3,664 sedans, 736 wagons, and 288 hardtops.

=== United Kingdom ===
Rambler Americans (along with Rambler Classics) were first imported into the UK by London company Nash Concessionaires Ltd. They had previously been the UK importer of Nash vehicles. The UK vehicles were imported with right-hand drive from AMC's facility in Peel Village near Brampton, Canada. Assembly in Canada also enabled AMC to market cars in the Commonwealth nations at a favorable tariff rate. Nash Concessionaires was also involved in the export of the British-built Nash Metropolitan to the U.S.

Rambler Motors (AMC) Ltd of Chiswick in West London had assembled Hudson motor vehicles for the UK market since 1926. The operation became a subsidiary of AMC in 1961 and changed its name to Rambler Motors (AMC) Ltd in 1966. Rambler Motors went on to import factory right-hand-drive AMC vehicles from 1961 and into the 1970s. Parts and spares were supplied locally out of the Chiswick service center located on Great West Road for the whole of the United Kingdom, Europe, and the Middle East. In addition to Rambler parts, the stock of spares also covered Hudson, Nash, and Austin Metropolitan parts.

Right-hand-drive Rambler Americans were not available with V8 engines, overdrive transmission, power steering, or air conditioning.

== Rambler Tarpon ==
The Rambler American also served as the basis for the Rambler Tarpon, a sporty 2+2 "youth-oriented" concept car. The semiboat-tail-roofed fastback hardtop coupe was developed in 1963 from the tooling that was already set for the 1964 model year Rambler Americans. Shown before the introduction of Ford's compact Falcon-based Mustang, AMC's show car was "an instant success" with 60% of surveyed potential buyers stating they would buy one. The Tarpon was aimed at the Plymouth Valiant, and anticipated a new market segment that later became known as the pony cars; however, AMC executives introduced the Rambler Marlin, a larger personal luxury car. The automaker waited until the 1968 model year to introduce the Javelin, a small fastback aimed directly at the market segment that was created by the Ford Mustang.

== Records ==
=== Economy ===
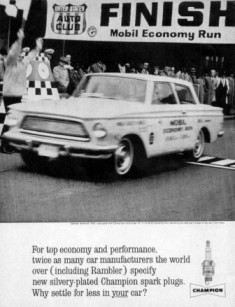
1962 American winning the Mobil Economy Run in an advertisement for Champion spark plugs

The American was introduced as the North American economy was in a recession and buyers were looking for smaller and more economical cars, and the Rambler brand was known as a fuel miser. The Rambler American was a yearly winner of the best fuel economy in the Mobil Economy Run and the Pure Oil Company Economy Trials, even during later years when fuel efficiency was not a major factor in the purchase of automobiles.

For example, the five-day event in 1959 covered 1,898 miles (3,055 km). A Rambler American Deluxe topped the 47-car Mobilgas Economy Run field with an average 25.2878 miles per US gallon (9.3015 L/100 km; 30.3694 mpg_{‑imp}). The 1959 Pure Oil Trials were conducted from Los Angeles to Miami, featuring 2,837 miles (4,566 km) covering over all types of terrain and driving types, where a Rambler American with overdrive set the all-time NASCAR-supervised coast-to-coast average economy record of 35.4 miles per US gallon (6.64 L/100 km; 42.5 mpg_{‑imp}).

In the 1960 Mobilgas Economy Run, a Custom two-door sedan returned 28.35 miles per US gallon (8.30 L/100 km; 34.05 mpg_{‑imp}) over a route of more than 2,000 miles (3,200 km), finishing first in the compact class. Further proof of the American's exceptional fuel economy came when an overdrive-equipped car driven coast to coast under NASCAR's watchful eyes averaged 38.9 miles per US gallon (6.05 L/100 km; 46.7 mpg_{‑imp}). However, the most astounding demonstration was the record set in the Pure Oil Economy Trials, another NASCAR-supervised event: 51.281 miles per US gallon (4.5868 L/100 km; 61.586 mpg_{‑imp}), which AMC sagely noted, "No car owner should expect to approach in everyday driving."

In the 1964 run, a six-cylinder Rambler American 440 sedan averaged 27.8336 miles per US gallon (8.4507 L/100 km; 33.4268 mpg_{‑imp}), once again the best of all the cars that year.

Economy claims for stock cars could be confirmed by these open and sanctioned trials. American Motors (and its original equipment manufacturer suppliers, such as the print advertisement for Champion spark plugs) promoted the results of this popular event in its advertising as a marketing technique that further emphasized the thriftiness of the Rambler Americans.

Rambler's emphasis on economy over performance can be observed through the example of automatic transmission use in a Rambler American where the 1959 owner's handbook describes leaving the gear selector in the D-2 position (1.47:1 gear ratio) blocks access to low gear (2.40 ratio) when starting out from a stop; therefore, given the car's 3.31 axle, this yields an initial 4.86:1 final drive ratio reducing crankshaft revolutions for maximum fuel economy.

=== Music ===
In 1958, the Playmates recorded a novelty song called "Beep Beep" about a duel between a Cadillac driver who just cannot shake a "little Nash Rambler" following him. The song uses an accelerating (accelerando) tempo and ends with the Rambler passing the Cadillac "...in second gear!" The song was on Billboard Top 40 charts for 12 weeks while also selling over a million copies, and it was awarded a gold disc. Concurrently with the popularity of this song, AMC was setting production and sales records for the Rambler models. This was also the same year the old Rambler reappeared as the new American, with the song popularizing the re-released car and making AMC the only automaker have increased sales during the recession of 1958.

=== Drag racing ===
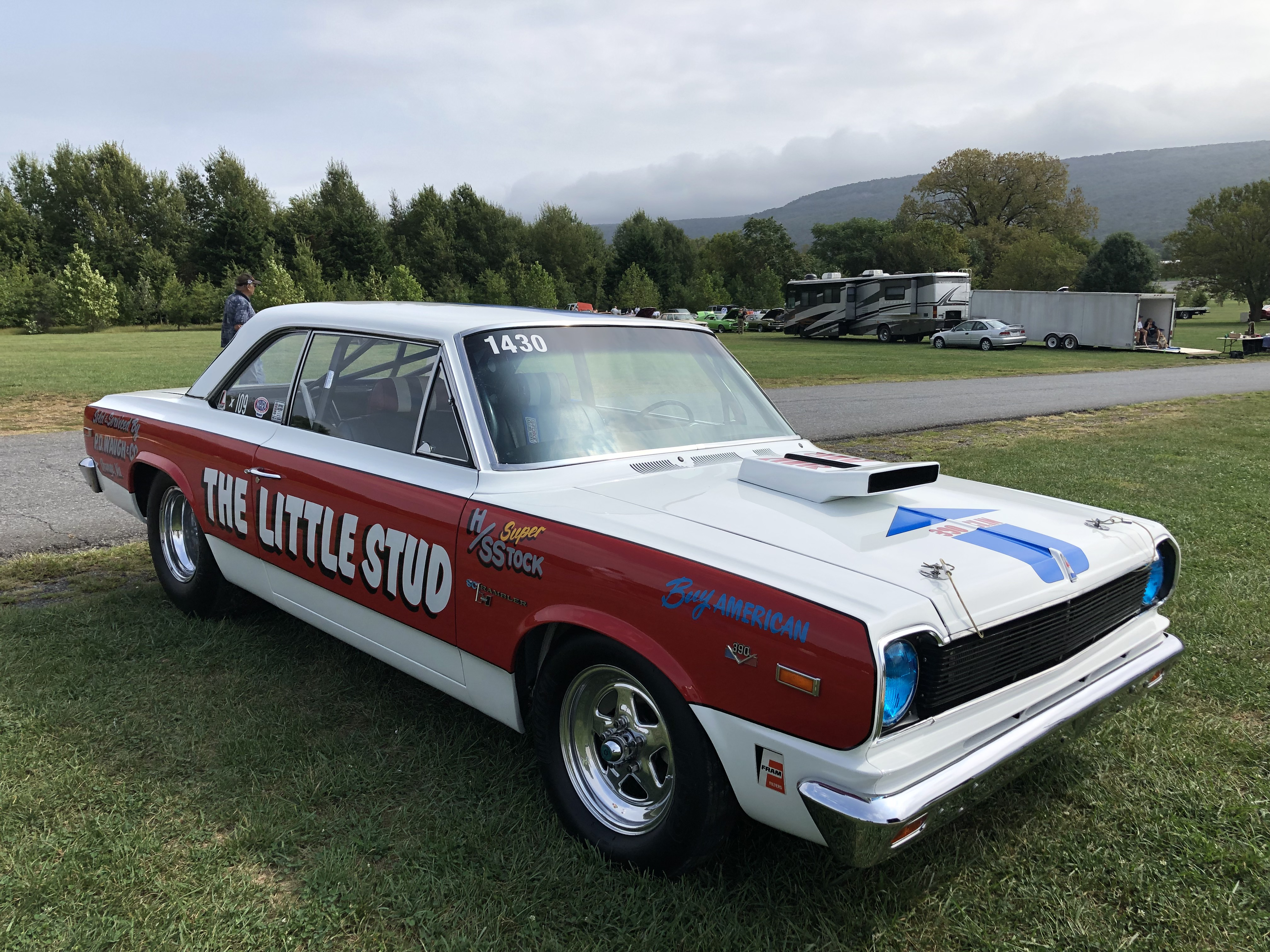
"The Little Stud" remains as an original race-prepared H Super Stock class from 1969

American Motors was not actively involved in auto racing during the early 1960s as not to glamorize corporate sponsorship of activities that promote dangerous speeds and driving. It continued to support the 1957 Automobile Manufacturers Association prohibition on automobile racing. The automaker ran national advertisements: "Why don't we enter high-performance Rambler V-8s in racing? Because the only race Rambler cares about is the human race."

However, independent AMC dealerships began sponsoring cars in drag-racing events. Preston Honea achieved fame with the 1964 "Bill Kraft Rambler" American from Norwalk, California. The car had a transplanted AMC V8 engine that was bored out to 418 cu in (6.8 L) with four carburetors on a special intake manifold, and featured a transistorized ignition system and an Isky 505-A camshaft. The big engine from an Ambassador added only 80 pounds (36.3 kg) more than the venerable 195.6 cu in (3.2 L) straight six normally found in the small two-door American. However, with its 8200-rpm redline, the Rambler ran 112 mph (180 km/h) at the Fontana dragstrip.

After the departure of Roy Abernethy, AMC eagerly embraced automobile competition and its effect on car sales. It sponsored Rambler Americans in various motorsport venues and produced a factory-ready Rambler American for drag racing – as noted above with the 1969 SC/Rambler.

=== Off-road ===
Mexico hosted a grueling mostly off-road race, the Baja 500. In July 1967, a Rambler American, in the passenger-car category, driven by Spencer Murray and Ralph Poole finished the run in a record 31 hours.

American Motors then focused attention on this type of racing and signed up James Garner's American International Racers (AIR) team to a three-year contract. Garner's shops prepared ten 1969 SC/Ramblers that were provided by AMC. The cars were modified for the punishing Baja 500 race. Raising the suspension and using Goodyear tires on 10x15-inch wheels increased ground clearance. All window glass was removed and roll cages were installed. The cars had 44 US gal (167 L; 37 imp gal) fuel tanks. Two cars were further modified with four-wheel drive. The AIR team built AMC's 390 cu in (6.4 L) V8 engines to blueprint tolerances, thus increasing horsepower to 410 hp (306 kW; 416 PS) at the flywheel. The cars were capable of 140 mph (225 km/h) runs along smooth straights at about 7000 rpm in fourth gear. The finished weight of the race cars was 3,140 pounds (1,424 kg) "identical to original stock-form shipping weight - despite the mammoth 44-gallon fuel tank amidships, the steel-lined undersides and 10x15 Goodyear earthmover-like tires."

On 11 June 1969, eight of the Ramblers were entered into the passenger-car category and the two 4WD versions were in the experimental class. Garner did not drive in the race because of a film commitment in Spain. Seven of the Ramblers finished the grueling race, taking three of the top five places in the passenger-car class. One of the 4WD came in fourth in its class. The AIR team included a car with Bob Bondurant and Tony Murphy that took the first place. For one of the winning Rambler drivers, this was his first race and the experience launched the career of Walker Evans.

=== Rallying ===
Rambler Americans competed with good results in the Shell 4000 Rally that was held in Canada. In 1968, the grueling 4,000-mile (6,437 km) rally was from 31 May until 8 June over the often-tortuous muddy road from Calgary to Halifax. The AMC team finished second, third, and fifth, winning the manufacturers' team award.

The cars were built in AMC's Brampton Assembly in Canada. Three were painted white with black hoods and one was finished in blue. Their competition equipment included AMC's new 390 cu in (6.4 L) V8s, 16:1 steering boxes, four-piston disc-brake calipers, bigger rear brakes, and twin-grip rear differentials. The cars continued to be campaigned in Canada during the early 1970s.

One of the three historically significant rally-prepared 1968 Rambler Americans was available in 2021.

== Battery power experiments ==
In 1959, AMC and Sonotone Corporation announced work on a car to be powered by a "self-charging" battery. It was to have sintered plate nickel-cadmium batteries. During the 1960s, AMC partnered with Gulton Industries to develop a new battery based on lithium and to use an advanced speed controller designed by Victor Wouk. However, the actual running prototype was a 1969 Rambler American station wagon converted from 290 cu in (4.8 L) V8 to an all-electric car using nickel–cadmium batteries. Power consisted of 160 cells, each rated at 75 ampere hours (Gulton KO-75), arranged in two banks of 80 cells each, and connected in parallel. The equipment Wouk designed "gave it good acceleration, but there was still a problem with the car's range."

In 1967, AMC and Gulton built the Amitron, a purpose EV rather than installing batteries and an electric motor in an existing production model, and later the similar Electron concept city car.

== Legacy ==
=== Pony car ===
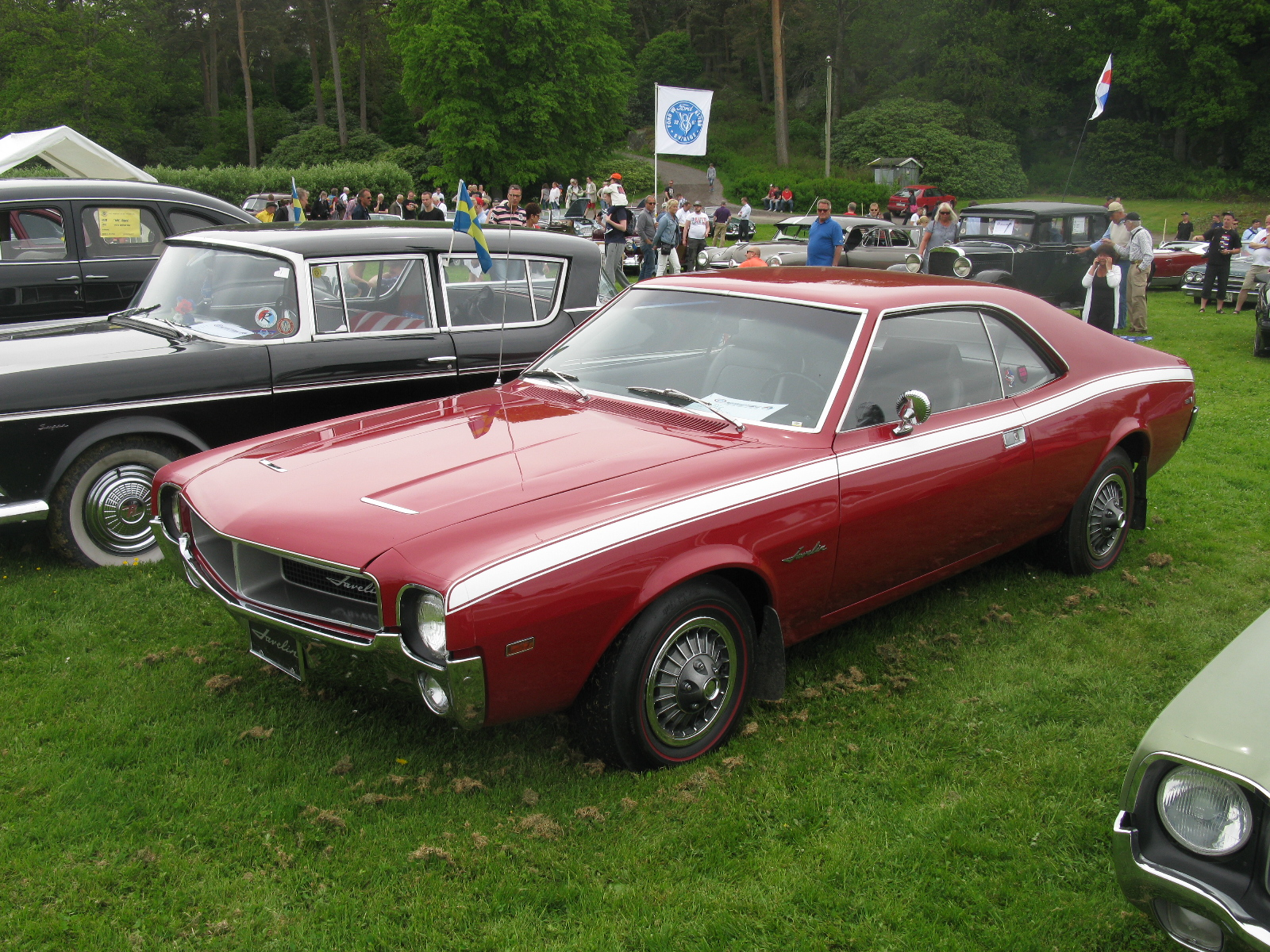
1968 Javelin

American Motors used the compact Rambler American chassis as the basis for the 1968 Javelin, a two-door hardtop marketed as a "hip", dashing, and affordable pony car, available in several muscle car performance versions. This followed the pattern that Ford used to develop the Mustang by using the basic platform and components of the compact Ford Falcon. Built on the Rambler American chassis, the Javelin was introduced for the 1968 model year and "immediately established itself as a threat to the established pony car order." The Richard Teague designed "clean-lined Javelin was still in the shadow of the old Rambler" so AMC entered racing series for production-based cars and achieved numerous wins.

=== Music and TV ===
Rambler '65 album cover

In 1988, Ben Vaughn, a musician and a longtime Rambler automobile fan, released "El Rambler Dorado" on his Blows Your Mind album. He later recorded an entire album in his 1965 Rambler American. Released in 1997 by Rhino Records and titled Rambler '65, Vaughn turned his car into a makeshift studio. The list of equipment used in recording the songs includes "2 Quarts Quaker State Oil" that typically is not used in making music. Putting the recording equipment inside his Rambler was a gimmick or an act of showmanship, but according to most reviews, the music he created inside his car is "timeless" rock 'n' roll. The Rambler '65 full 24-minute music video also includes vintage AMC TV advertising clips.

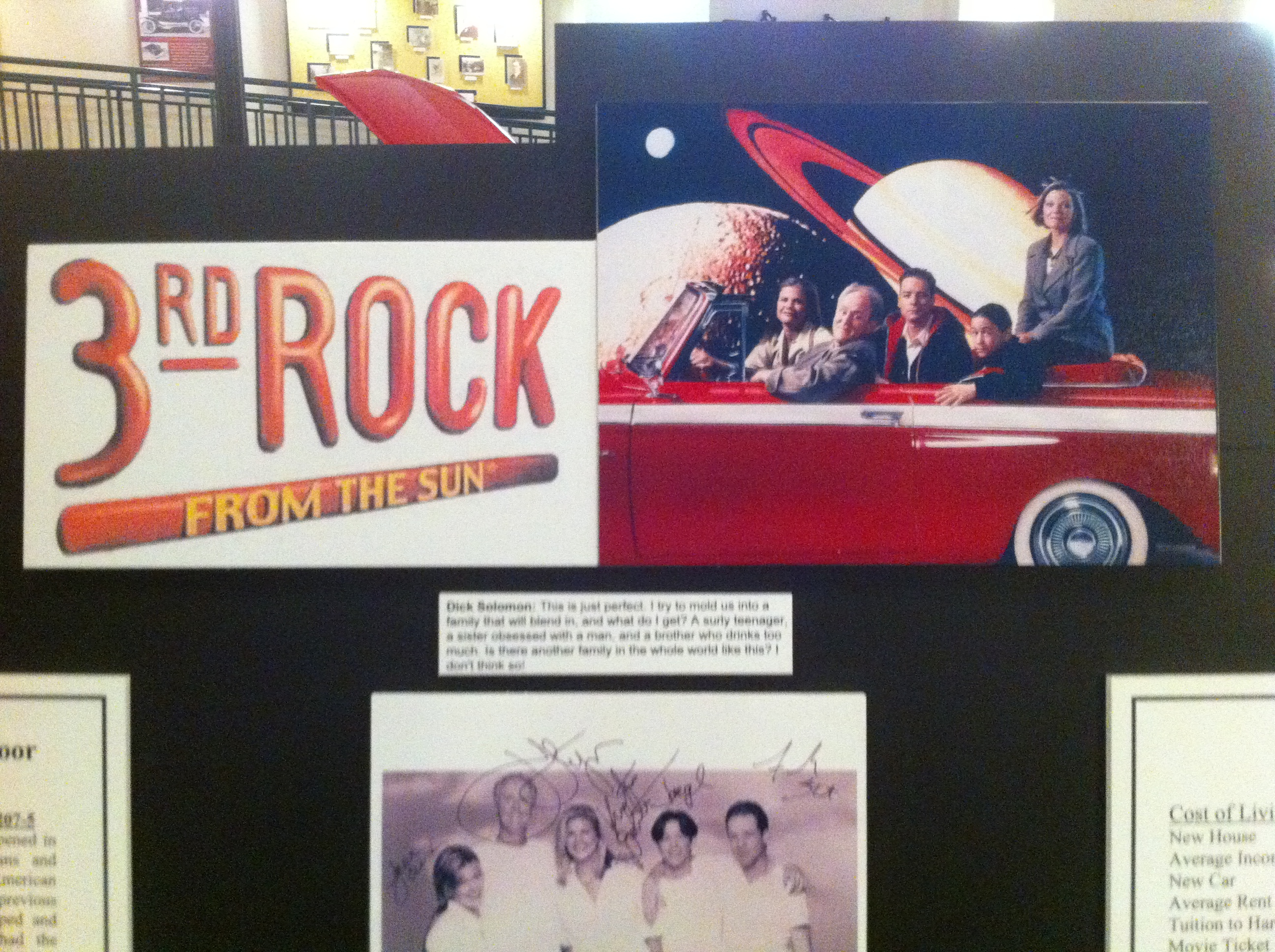
3rd Rock from the Sun museum display

1962 Rambler American 400 Convertible ("The Fifth Solomon") from 3rd Rock from the Sun on display at the Kenosha History Center

Vaughn also achieved success in Hollywood as the composer for the hit NBC television series 3rd Rock from the Sun, in which the main characters use a 1962 Rambler American convertible. The car is featured in posters and in the 100th episode (during season five) entitled "The Fifth Solomon", the space aliens "learn that it's possible to get emotionally attached to a car" after they crash their Rambler and have no insurance. Vaughn promoted his new Rambler '65 album while serving as a composer on the NBC sitcom by appearing on programs such as KTLA Morning News together with his associates.

=== Romney campaign ===
Mitt Romney launched his 2008 campaign for U.S. president at The Henry Ford museum while next to an old Rambler. During his 2006–2007 campaign, he sat in a Rambler American at fund-raising events as a way to emphasize the need for more efficient cars. He also stated that his father (George W. Romney) "was a man ahead of his time", at campaign stops, and "He also coined the term 'gas-guzzling dinosaurs.' That's what we're driving today and that's got to change." During his campaign, Mitt Romney was even described as "The Rambler American" by a journalist in an analysis of his prospects among voters in Michigan "where he was reared and where his father was the chief of American Motors and a successful governor."

== Collectibility ==
More than 50 years after it was produced, the mission of the first-generation Rambler American as "an affordable, stylish people mover hasn't changed - though now it's rolling stingily down the road as a collector's item rather than a daily beater." The economical car "that put Detroit on notice is one of today's most affordable, fun collectibles."

Benefiting from network television exposure, the 1962 Rambler American convertible became "a hot ticket item" for collectors after it began to appear regularly on 3rd Rock from the Sun with owners of rusty cars asking high prices and prime examples commanding upward of $14,000. A fully restored 1962 convertible was given to Mitt Romney on his 60th birthday by his son, Tagg, in 2008.

While some sedans may not be particularly sought after because they were "just basic, reliable, unpretentious transportation for practical people," but examples like a 1968 Rambler American two-door with three-on-the-tree transmission that are "shockingly original" can become quite appealing.

The limited-edition, midyear addition to the Rambler line "built under the aegis of the Hurst shifter people" is unique. The SC/Rambler has a strong collector following with websites, clubs, and a registry.

The SC/Rambler has become a popular muscle car to replicate because of the ease of installing a powerful AMC V8 drivetrain into one of the large number of inexpensive 1966 through 1969 Rambler Americans. To identify a true SC/Rambler, it must be a hardtop and the vehicle identification number must have the letter M in the third digit and the engine code of X as the seventh digit. Additionally, there is a stamped number hidden behind the steering box that has the letter X (indicating a factory 390 car) followed by the last 6 digits of the VIN which should match the numbers on the dash tag.

Most SC/Ramblers took extensive abuse, as they were raced hard, and stories are told of cars being sold with their time slips passing along with the vehicle. According to Old Cars Weekly magazine, "a No. 1 condition example can still be had for mid-five figures. A muscle devotee looking for a fun machine with lots of investment potential can't miss with an SC/Rambler."

== Production ==
Total Rambler American production by year
Year	Rambler American	Rambler American Wagon	Total
1958	30,640	-	30,640
1959	58,852	32,639	91,491
1960	91,790	28,813	120,603
1961	102,161	33,842	136,003
1962	98,408	27,268	125,676
1963	76,050	12,826	88,876
1964	135,010	28,649	163,659
1965	95,346	17,537	112,883
1966	81,240	12,412	93,652
1967	56,056	6,624	62,680
1968	86,084	8,285	94,369
1969	97,541	-	97,541
