= Pars Khodro =

Iranian automobile manufacturer

- Company type: Public
- Traded as: TSE: PKOD1; ISIN: IRO1PKOD0008
- Industry: Automotive
- Founded: 1956; 70 years ago
- Headquarters: Tehran, Iran
- Area served: Abdollah Soltani Sani
- Products: Automobiles; Engines
- Parent: SAIPA
- Website: www.parskhodro.ir

Pars Khodro (Persian: پارس خودرو) is an Iranian automobile manufacturer. It was the first manufacturer of sport utility vehicles (SUVs) in Iran.

== History ==
Formerly, Pars Khodro built American Motors' Rambler and General Motors (GM) products under licence. Its first cars, the Aria and the Shahin, were based on AMC's compact 1966 Rambler American and were launched in 1967. Production ended in 1974. It also built Jeep CJ, Jeep Wagoneer, Jeep Gladiator and Mitsubishi Jeep models under licence. The company was called Sherkat-Sahami Jeep at that time.

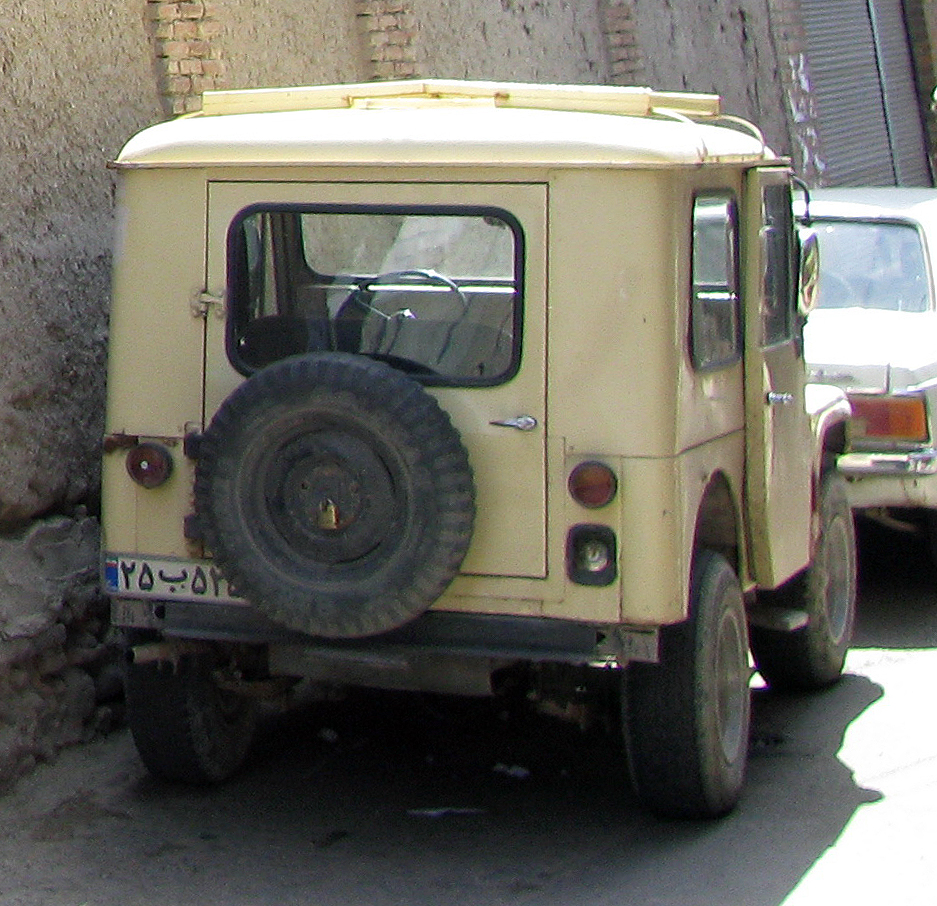
Sherkat-Sahami Shahbaz (Jeep CJ)

In June 1972, Sherkat-Sahami signed a deal with GM and formed General Motors Iran Ltd. GM Iran produced the Opel Commodore under licence from 1974 until 1976, with "Chevrolet Royale" badging. These models featured 2.5- and 2.8-litre engines. After having developed a reputation for reliability problems, the Royale was replaced on the Iranian production lines by the Buick Skylark ("Buick Iran"), Cadillac Seville ("Cadillac Iran") and Chevrolet Nova, along with a Chevrolet pick-up truck. The Jeep continued during this time. These were built until 1981, the Iranian Revolution forcing the cessation of their manufacture and links with GM.

Afterward, Pars Khodro switched to the manufacture of the Nissan Patrol and pickups under licence. The last Patrol was produced in 2002.

In 1995, Pars Khodro acquired an additional Renault 5 assembly line from SAIPA. SAIPA is a fellow Iranian manufacturer who had been making the car since 1976 as a replacement for the Iranian-built Citroën Dyane. The Sepand I and II were versions of the original Renault 5, succeeded by a widened version with Kia Pride underpinnings, called the Sepand PK.

In 2000, 51 per cent of Pars Khodro's shares were purchased by SAIPA, which in turn is 48 per cent owned by the Iranian Government.

== Today's range ==
Pars Khodro has built Renault and Nissan models under licence. Nissan models include the Maxima, Roniz (Xterra), Teana, Patrol, and Safari.

From 2006, Pars Khodro began to manufacture the Dacia Logan, Dacia Sandero and Renault Mégane under license, with the Logan being built in a joint-venture with Renault until 2018 as the Renault Tondar 90.

At the moment, only the SAIPA Renault Pars Tondar (an updated local version of the Tondar 90), Pars Khodro H220, Pars Khodro H230, Pars Khodro H320, Pars Khodro Haise and Pars Khodro H330 are being sold. (Production stopped due to US sanctions on Iran)

=== Current Products ===
- Saipa Quik R
- Pars Khodro Cadilla

== See also ==
- Automotive industry in Iran
