= Saipa 151 =

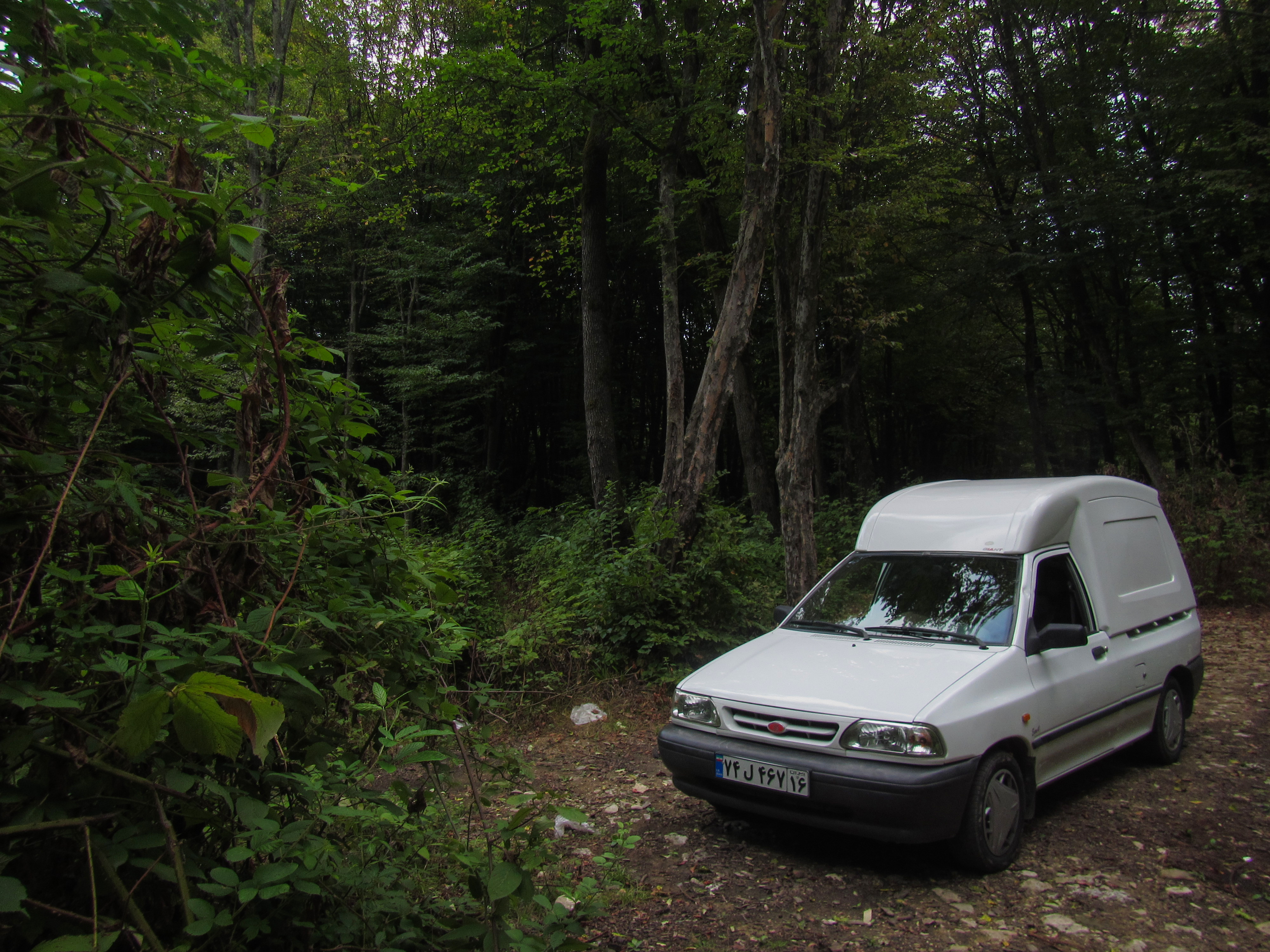

Overview
- Manufacturer: Saipa
- Production: 2011-present

Body and chassis
- Body style: coupé utility
- Related: Mazda 121; Ford Festiva; Kia Pride; New P.K

Powertrain
- Engine: 1324 cc SOHC, 71 mm × 83.6 mm (2.80 in × 3.29 in), 65 hp (48 kW), 77 ft·lbf (105 N·m)

Dimensions
- Wheelbase: 2,295 mm (90.4 in)
- Length: 3,475 mm (136.8 in)
- Width: 1,605 mm (63.2 in)
- Curb weight: 725 kg (1,598 lb)

Chronology
- Predecessor: Kia Pride

The Saipa 151 is a coupé utility produced by Saipa in Iran. It is a small 500 kg (1,102 lb) utility made on the body of the Kia Pride (same as Mazda 121 and Ford Festiva). Saipa corporation classifies it as an economy class vehicle.
