= SAIPA =

Iranian automaker

Saipa Motor Corporation
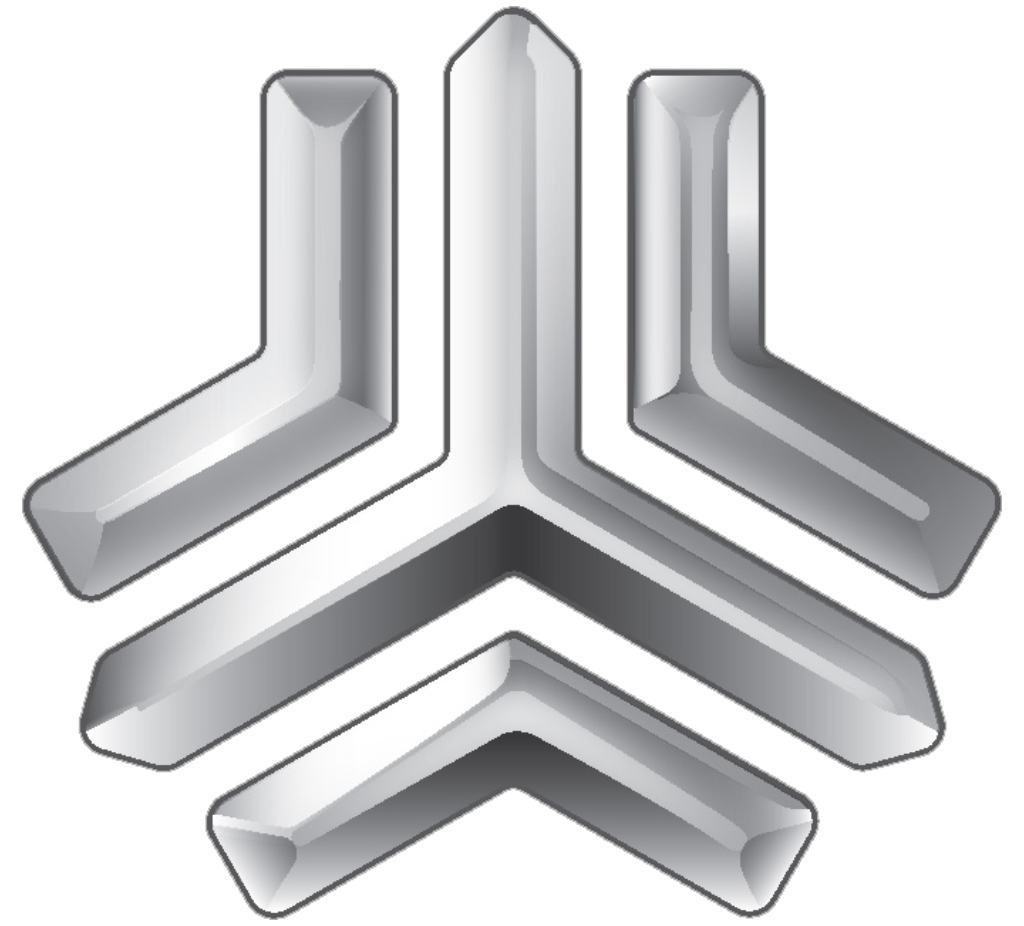
- Type: Public company
- Traded as: TSE: TWSE: k ISIN: IRO1SIPA0001
- Industry: Automotive
- Founded: 1965; 61 years ago
- Headquarters: Tehran, Iran
- Area served: Iran, Russia, Venezuela, Africa
- Key people: Ali Sheikhzadeh (president and CEO)
- Products: Automobiles; Commercial Vehicles; Engines; Automotive parts
- Revenue: ▲US$21.7 billion (2023)
- Owner: The Industrial Development & Renovation Organization of Iran (IDRO) (35.75%)
- Number of employees: 48,000 (2012)
- Subsidiaries: Saipa Diesel; Pars Khodro; SAIPA CITROËN
- Website: www.saipacorp.com

SAIPA (Persian: سایپا, SAIPA) is an Iranian automaker headquartered in Tehran. The SAIPAC (an acronym for the French Société anonyme iranienne de production des automobiles Citroën lit. Iranian Limited Company for the Production of Citroën Automobiles) was established in 1965 as with 75% Iranian ownership, to assemble Citroëns under license for the Iranian market. It changed its name into SAIPA (Société anonyme iranienne de production automobile) in 1975 when Citroën withdrew from the company. Its products in recent years have been mostly under-licensed Korean cars and its own engine and range of cars. The chief executive (president or managing director) of SAIPA is Ali Sheikhzadeh.

The main subsidiaries of SAIPA Group are Saipa Diesel, Pars Khodro and Zamyad Co.

== History ==
SAIPA began by assembling Citroën's two-cylinder mini car, the Dyane, in 1968. It went under the name Jyane (or Jian) in Iran. SAIPA built 120,000 Jyane models.

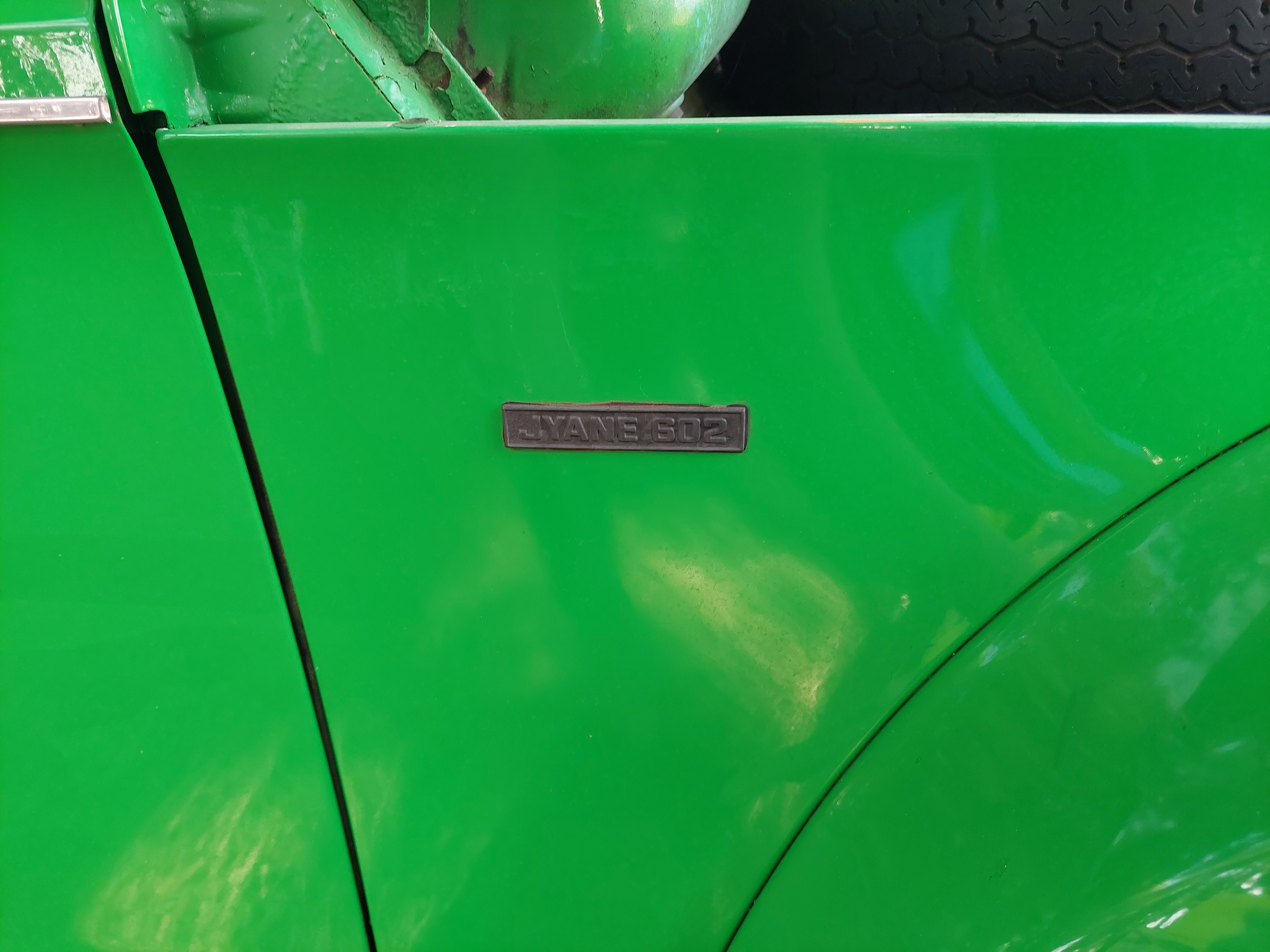
SAIPA Iranian Citroën Dyane 'Jyane 602' nameplate

There was also a glazed panel van version of the Jyane, as well as the Baby-Brousse, a rustic little buggy in the style of a Citroën Méhari but with a metal body. Later, a pickup version of the Jyane also appeared. The Baby-Brousse was built from 1970 until 1979. In 1975 Saipa began manufacturing licensed versions of the original Renault 5 and later the Renault 21. Production of Citroëns ended in 1980.

From 1986 to 1998 SAIPA built the Z24 pickup, a license-built version of the 1970-1980 Nissan Junior with a 2.4-litre engine. In 1998 SAIPA took over the Zamyad company, which then undertook the production of the Z24. Since 2003, this truck has been sold under the Zamyad brand.

Renault 5 production ended in 1994 (Pars Khodro took over the production lines) and the 21 was discontinued in 1997. In 1993 a relationship with KIA began, and production of the Kia Pride commenced. SAIPA's Pride is marketed under the names Saba (saloon) and Nasim (hatchback). At the 2001 Tehran Motor Show the liftback Saipa 141 was added to the lineup. This is a five-door version based on the Saba and is somewhat longer than the Nasim. The Pride series cars carry 97% local content. From 2001 to late 2010, SAIPA produced the Citroën Xantia under license. Sedan models of the previous generation Kia Rio were assembled using parts imported from Korea from May 2005 to late 2012, when SAIPA lost its license to produce them.

In 2000, SAIPA launched its own design, the 701 Caravan minivan, face-lifted in 2003.

In 2002, a lift-back version of the Saba was introduced as the 141. Models 132 debuted in 2007 and 111 in 2009. The Iran-made "SAIPA National Engine 231" was introduced in November 2008.

In December 2008, the Tiba/Miniator debuted the Tiba with a 4-cylinder gas engine and ABS, averaging 7 liters of gasoline per 100 kilometers and putting out 80 PS (59 kW) with a displacement of 1,500 cc. The price quoted at the time of its launch was less than 100 million rials (US$10,000). The car was designed in country and produced with the services of some 122 local manufacturers. 15,000 Tiba were to be produced in 2009. Production over the succeeding three years was to reach 200,000 per year by a new subsidiary, Kashan SAIPA. The Tiba is expected to replace the Kia Pride. The share of Tiba/Miniator in SAIPA's exports will be about 20 percent by 2011. The model was originally named Miniator but was later changed to Tiba (gazelle).

In 2012, a pick-up version of the SAIPA Pride was introduced as the 151.

In 2015, the company began the production of cars derived from Chinese manufacturers.

In 2019, it was reported in the press that the SAIPA Quik was due to be assembled by an African firm as the Mureza Prim8 in Rosslyn, South Africa, with the company hoping to start production at the Willowvale Motor Industries plant in Zimbabwe in the following years.

== Sanction ==
On October 1, 2026, the U.S. Department of the Treasury added several Iranian companies and entities—including the Iranian automaker SAIPA—to its sanctions list.

== Pars Khodro acquisition ==
In 2000, SAIPA purchased 51% of Pars Khodro, where it manufactured the Citroën C5.

Since 2018, Pars Khodro has mainly assembled a range of Chinese models, but other products include the SAIPA Renault Pars Tondar, an updated locally built version of the first-generation Dacia Logan, which used to be assembled by SAIPA and its subsidiary Pars Khodro in a joint venture with Renault (Dacia's parent company). Originally known as the Renault Tondar 90, the company received over 100,000 orders for the car within a week of it going on sale in March 2007.

Production was launched in Venezuela in 2006 and in Syria in 2007.

== Models ==
=== Historic ===
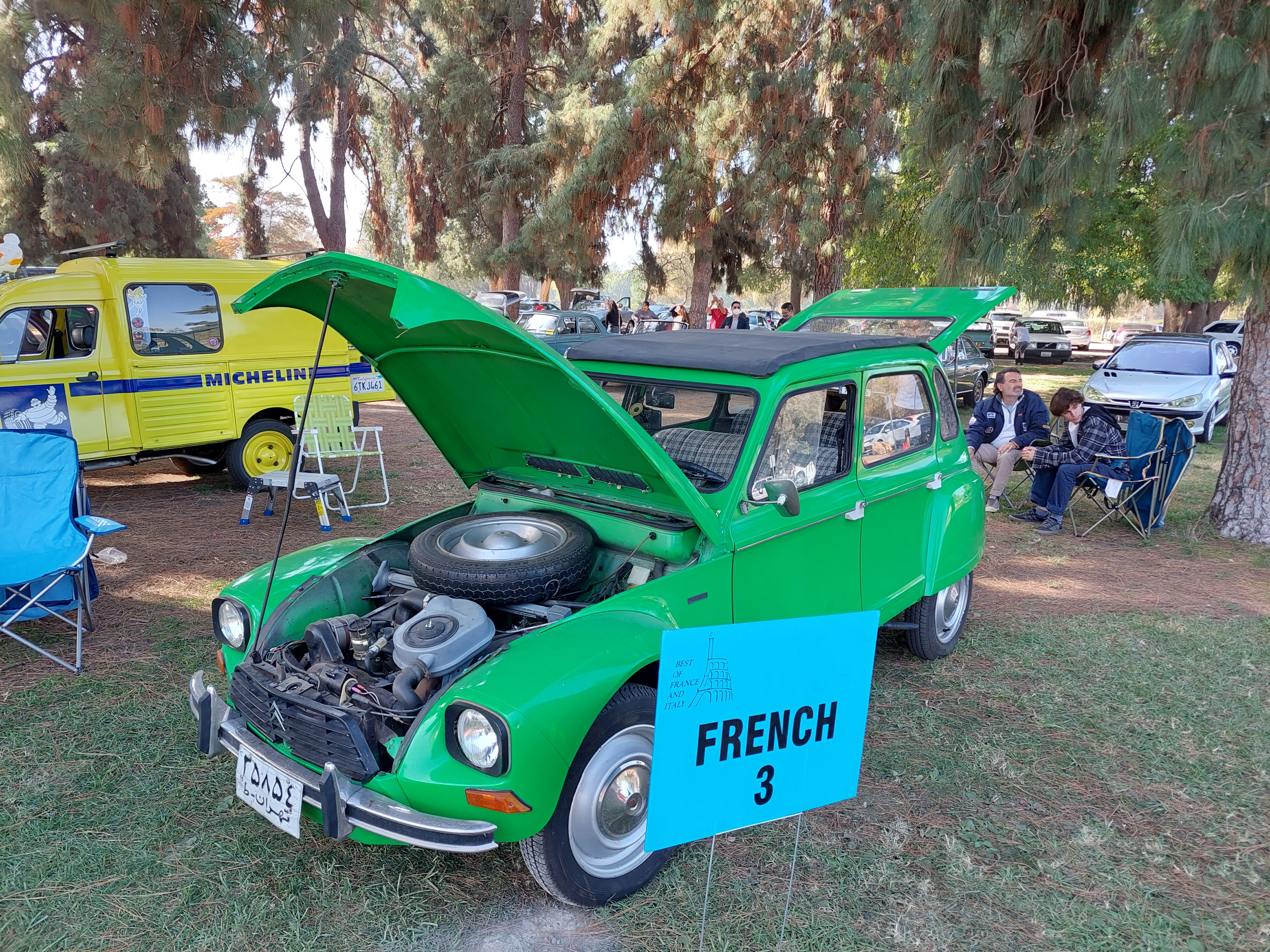
Citroën Jyane 602

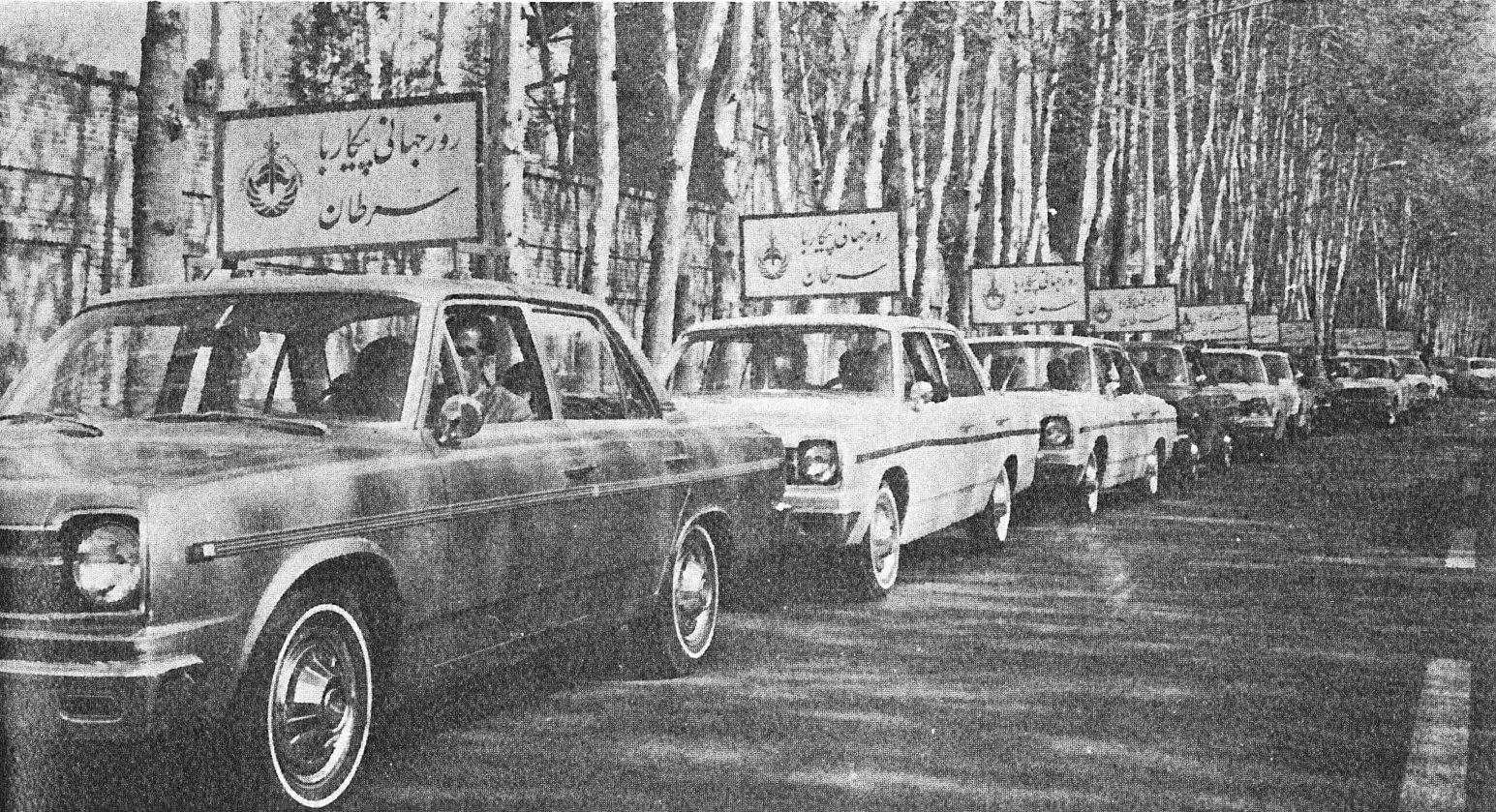
Aria and Shahin

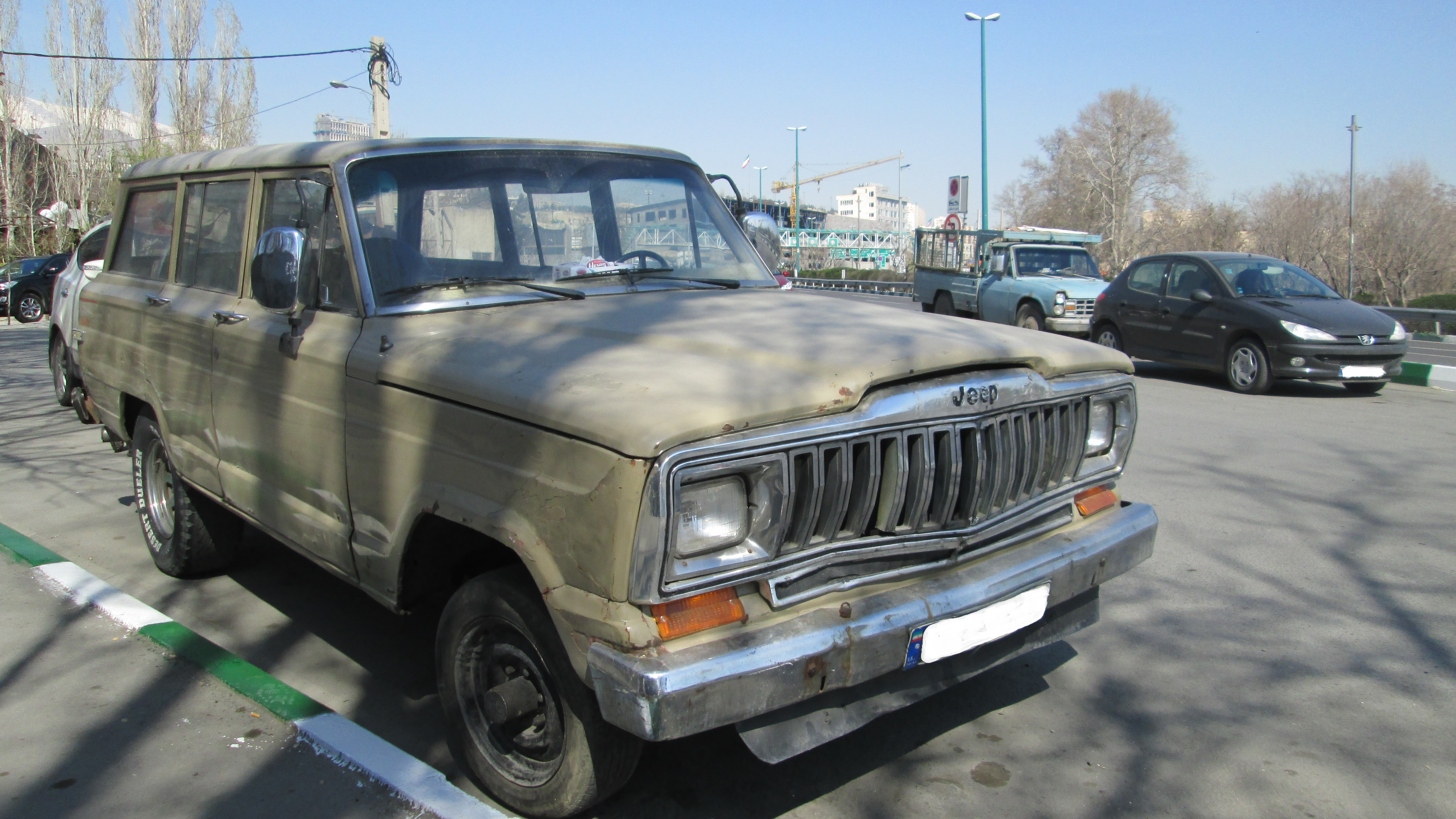
Jeep Ahoo and Simorugh

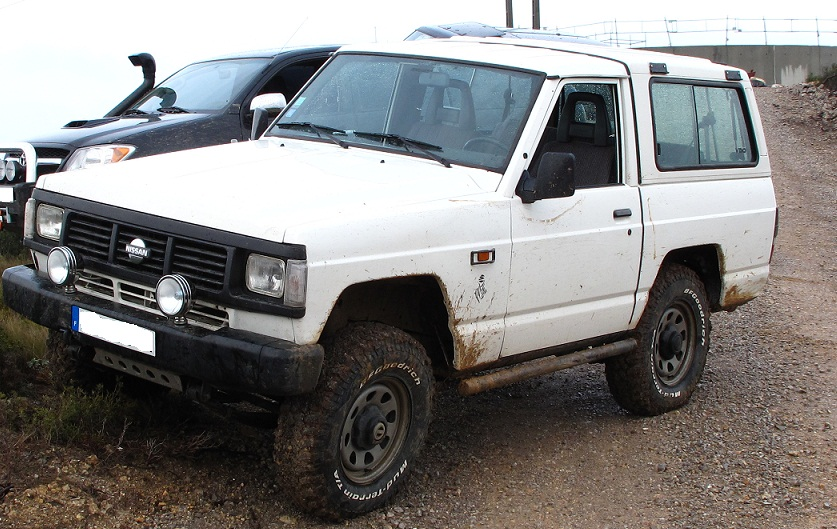
Nissan Patrol

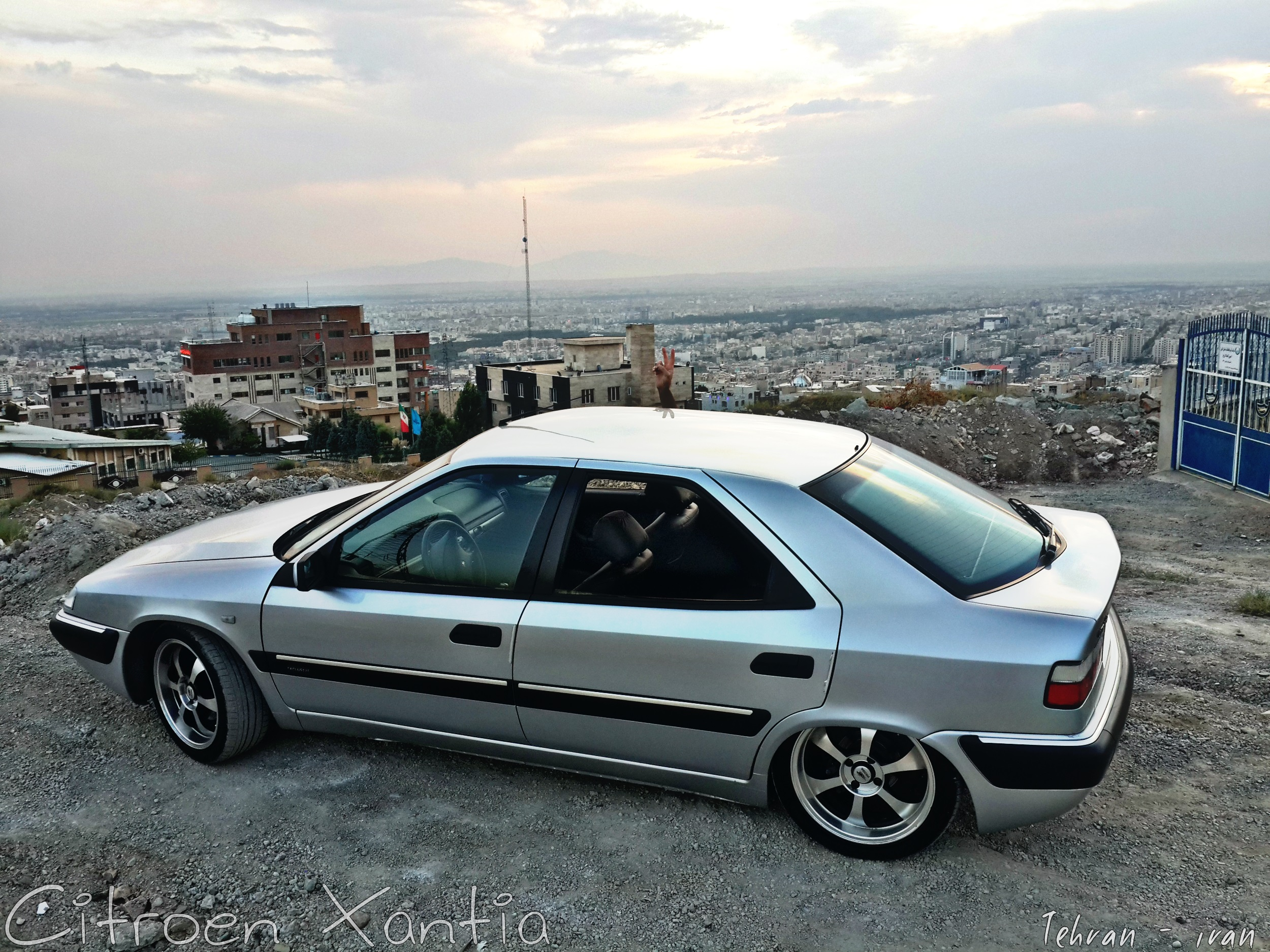
Citroën Xantia in Tehran

- Citroën 2CV
- Citroën Jyane 602
- Saipa 141
- Changan Eado
- Pars Khodro V5
- Kia Rio
- Renault Megane
- Nissan New Murano
- Nissan Teana
- Dongfeng Rich
- Nissan Roniz
- Zamyad Shooka
- Citroën Xantia
- Kia Pride
- Pars Khodro Sepand
- Nissan Patrol
- Pars Khodro New Sepand
- Sherkat Sakami Jeep CJ
- Aria and Shahin
- Sherkat Sakami Jeep Ahoo and Simorgh
- Opel Commodore
- Chevrolet Iran
- Chevrolet Nova
- Buick Iran
- Sherkat Sakami Jeep Gladiator
- Cadillac Iran
- Saipa Caravan
- Jeep Sahra
- Citroën C3

=== Current ===
| Name | Image | Introduction |
|---|---|---|
| Saipa 151 (pride pickup) | Saba, Pride, | 2014 |
| Saina | Saipa Saina | 2016 |
| Quik | Saipa Quik | 2017 |
| Shahin | Saipa Shahin | 2019 |
| Aria | | 2022 |
| Atlas | Saipa Atlas | 2022 |
| Sahand | Saipa Sahand | 2023 |

Subsidiaries
| Name | Image | Introduction |
Pars Khodro
| Brilliance H230 - Pars Khodro H230 | Brilliance H230 - Pars Khodro H230 | 2014 |
| Brilliance H220 - Pars Khodro H220 | Brilliance H220 - Pars Khodro H220 | |
| Pars Khodro H330 Cross | Brilliance H330 - Pars Khodro H330 Cross | 2014 |
| Pars Tondar and Tondar 90 | Renault Logan -Pars Tondar and Tondar 90 | |
| Renault Sandero and Sandero Stepway | Renault Sandero and Sandero Stepway | 2014 |
| Pars Nova | Pars Khodro Cadila P90 | |
Zamyad
| Zamyad Z24 | Nissan Junior -Zamyad Z24 | |
| Padra | | 2015 |
| Padra Plus | | 2021 |
| Karun | | 2022 |

==== Other Models ====
- Kia Cerato
- Kia Forte
- Citroën C3-XR
- Jinbei Haise
- Dongfeng Rich
- Zamyad Padra
- Iveco Azar Minibus

== See also ==
- SAIPA Diesel
- IDRO
- Automotive industry in Iran
- Zamyad Co.
- Pars Khodro
