= Ebrahim Sadeghi =

Iranian footballer (born 1979)

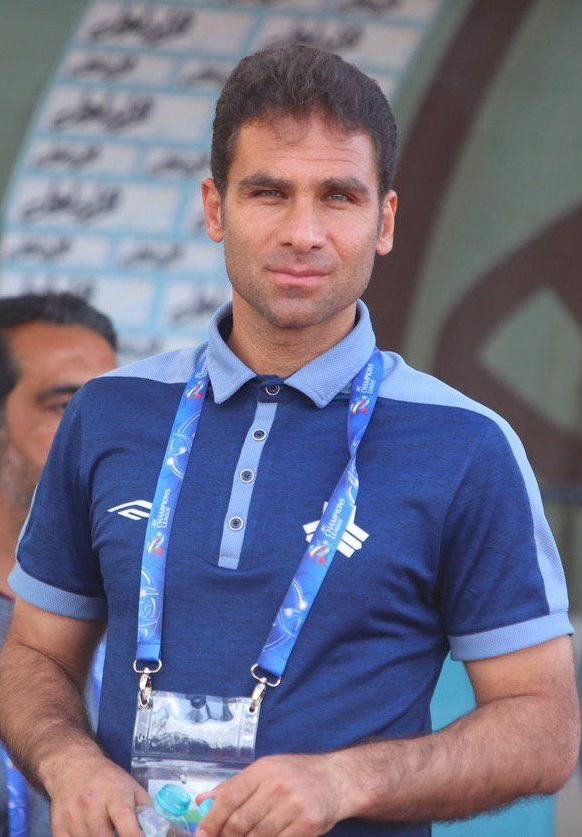
- Sadeghi in 2019

Personal information
- Full name: Ebrahim Sadeghi Senjani
- Date of birth: 4 February 1979 (age 47)
- Place of birth: Karaj, Iran
- Height: 1.78 m (5 ft 10 in)
- Position: Midfielder

Team information
- Current team: Saipa (manager)

Youth career
- 1992–1995: Keshavarz Karaj
- 1995–1998: Persepolis
- 1998–1999: Moghavemat Tehran
- 2000: Saipa

Senior career*
| Years | Team | Apps | (Gls) |
| 2000–2017 | Saipa | 437 | (42) |

International career
| 2007–2008 | Iran | 15 | (1) |

Managerial career
- 2017–2019: Saipa (assistant)
- 2019–2021: Saipa
- 2021–2023: Mes Rafsanjan (assistant)
- 2023–2024: Zob Ahan Esfahan (assistant)
- 2024–2025: Saipa
- 2025–2026: Palayesh Naft Bandar Abbas
- 2026–: Saipa
- * Club domestic league appearances and goals

Ebrahim Sadeghi (Persian: ابراهیم صادقی, born 4 February 1979) is an Iranian football coach and retired player who played for Saipa for 17 years. He is the manager of Saipa in Azadegan League.

Sadeghi has been playing for Saipa since 2000. In 2010, Saipa Cultural and Athletic Corporation celebrated a testimonial ceremony for him because of "his loyalty to the club", calling him The Orange Loyal. He was also gifted a Saipa Tiba.

On 13 December 2015, in a match against Esteghlal Ahvaz Sadeghi played his 400th league match for the club, becoming the only player in the history of the Persian Gulf Pro League to reach this feat. He retired on 4 May 2017 after playing 17 seasons at Saipa at the top flight.

== Club career ==
=== Youth career ===
Sadeghi was born in Karaj, Iran. He joined Keshavarz at the age of thirteen and played at the club until 1995 where he was spotted by Persepolis and joined their academy. After three years at Persepolis he joined Moghavemat Tehran before settling at Saipa a year later.

=== Saipa ===
Sadeghi graduated from the Saipa youth ranks and was signed to the club in 2000. He has played for Saipa for his entire. His good performances since 2006–07 season made big clubs to show some interest on him. In 2008 Sadeghi was nominated for Asian Footballer of the Year, but failed to win the award. He played in AFC Champions League for Saipa and continued to play for the club in 2008–09 season.

In April 2008, Sadeghi was nominated for the 2008 Asian footballer of the year, as the sole Iranian player in the 21-player list of AFC.

== International career ==
He made his first cap for Iran national football team in January 2007 in a friendly match against the UAE. He scored in his debut. He was selected among Iran's final squad participating in the 2007 Asian Cup. He has been called up for 2010 FIFA World Cup Qualifying. Sadeghi played in West Asian Football Federation Championship 2008 and won the cup.

== Career statistics ==
=== Club ===
Appearances and goals by club, season and competition
| Club | Season | League | | | Hazfi Cup | | Asia | | Total | |
| Club | Season | Division | Apps | Goals | Apps | Goals | Apps | Goals | Apps | Goals |
|---|---|---|---|---|---|---|---|---|---|---|
| Saipa | Pro League | 2001–02 | 8 | 0 | 0 | 0 | – | – | 8 | 0 |
| Saipa | Pro League | 2002–03 | 15 | 1 | 0 | 0 | – | – | 15 | 1 |
| Saipa | Pro League | 2003–04 | 32 | 3 | 0 | 0 | – | – | 32 | 3 |
| Saipa | Pro League | 2004–05 | 27 | 3 | 2 | 0 | – | – | 29 | 3 |
| Saipa | Pro League | 2005–06 | 30 | 2 | 0 | 0 | – | – | 30 | 2 |
| Saipa | Pro League | 2006–07 | 29 | 5 | 1 | 0 | – | – | 30 | 5 |
| Saipa | Pro League | 2007–08 | 30 | 3 | 1 | 0 | 7 | 0 | 38 | 3 |
| Saipa | Pro League | 2008–09 | 31 | 1 | 1 | 0 | – | – | 32 | 1 |
| Saipa | Pro League | 2009–10 | 32 | 7 | 1 | 0 | – | – | 33 | 7 |
| Saipa | Pro League | 2010–11 | 34 | 4 | 1 | 1 | – | – | 35 | 5 |
| Saipa | Pro League | 2011–12 | 30 | 3 | 1 | 0 | – | – | 24 | 1 |
| Saipa | Pro League | 2012–13 | 32 | 1 | 0 | 0 | – | – | 32 | 1 |
| Saipa | Pro League | 2013–14 | 29 | 0 | 1 | 0 | – | – | 30 | 0 |
| Saipa | Pro League | 2014–15 | 27 | 2 | 1 | 0 | – | – | 28 | 2 |
| Saipa | Pro League | 2015–16 | 27 | 5 | 2 | 0 | – | – | 29 | 5 |
| Saipa | Pro League | 2016–17 | 24 | 2 | 3 | 0 | – | – | 27 | 2 |
| Career total | | | 437 | 42 | 15 | 1 | 7 | 0 | 452 | 41 |

=== International ===
Scores and results list Iran's goal tally first.

| # | Date | Venue | Opponent | Score | Result | Competition |
|---|---|---|---|---|---|---|
| 1 | 12 January 2007 | Sheikh Zayed Stadium, Abu Dhabi | United Arab Emirates | 1–0 | 2–0 | Friendly |

== Managerial statistics ==
As of 21 January 2020

| Team | From | To | Record | | | | | | | |
| Team | From | To | G | W | D | L | GF | GA | GD | Win % |
|---|---|---|---|---|---|---|---|---|---|---|
| Saipa | 1 May 2019 | 15 April 2021 | 34 | 6 | 16 | 12 | 29 | 39 | −10 | 17.65 |
| Total | | | 34 | 6 | 16 | 12 | 29 | 39 | −10 | 17.65 |

== Honours ==
Saipa

- Iran Pro League (1): 2006–07

Iran

- WAFF Championship (1): 2008
