= Saipa Atlas =

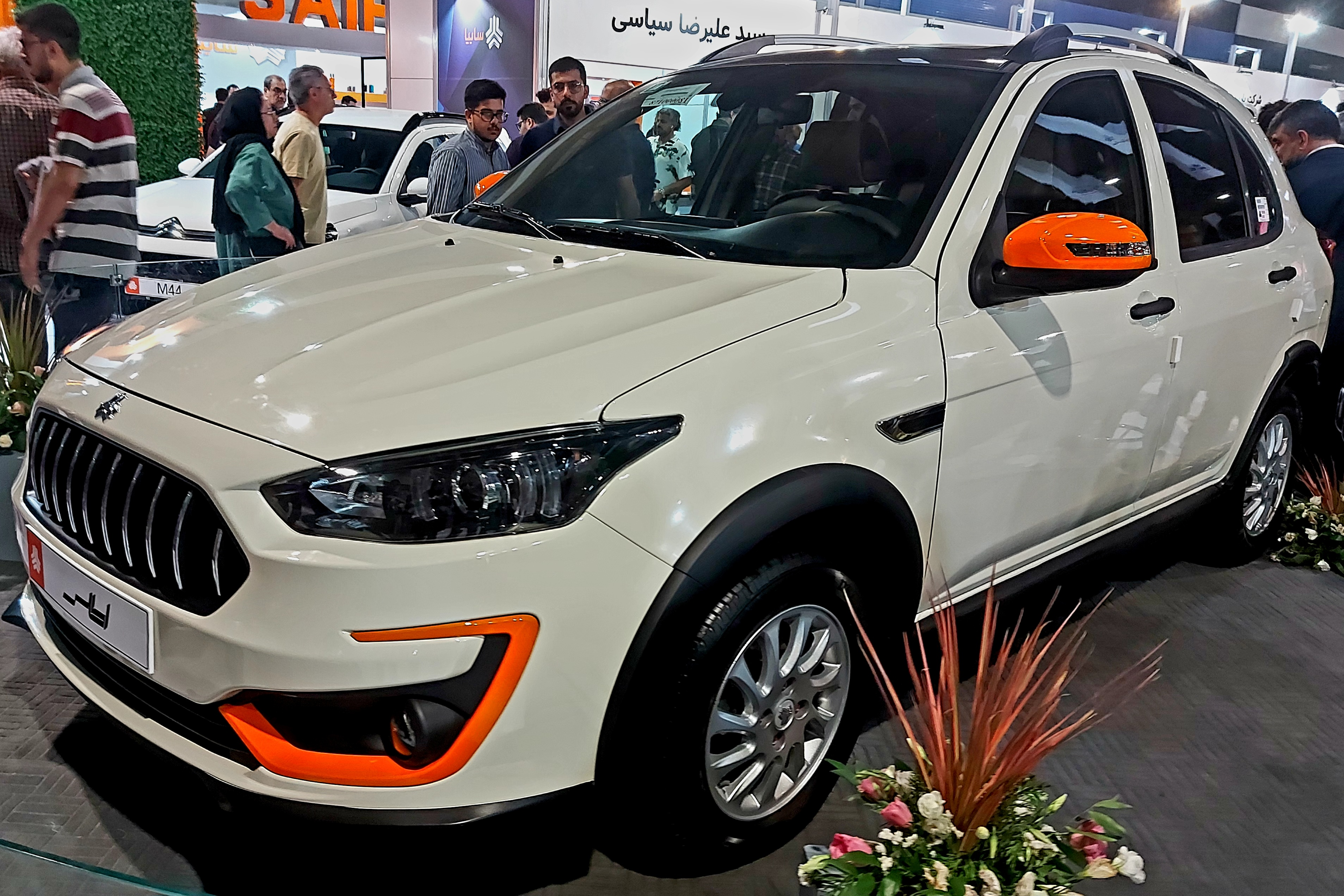
- 2023 Saipa Atlas

Overview
- Manufacturer: SAIPA
- Production: 2023–present
- Assembly: Iran: Tehran

Body and chassis
- Class: Subcompact crossover SUV
- Body style: 5-door hatchback
- Layout: Front-engine, front-wheel-drive
- Platform: X200
- Related: fa:سایپا سهند

Powertrain
- Engine: 1.5 L M15I I4 (petrol)
- Transmission: 5-speed manual 6-speed automatic

Dimensions
- Wheelbase: 2,410 mm (94.9 in)
- Length: 4,020 mm (158.3 in)
- Width: 1,685 mm (66.3 in)
- Height: 1,540 mm (60.6 in)

Chronology
- Predecessor: Saipa Quik

The Saipa Atlas is a hatchback manufactured by SAIPA, which was officially unveiled at the 2022 Automobile Industry Transformation Exhibition in Iran.

Although this car is considered a separate model, it is essentially a facelift of the Saipa Quik. Along with fa:سایپا سهند (which is a facelift for Saipa Saina itself) , Atlas is one of Saipa Automobile Group's new generation cars.

== Overview ==
The Atlas is the latest product in the Saipa range to use the X200 platform, featuring noticeable changes to the interior and exterior of the car, as well as having more equipment and options. It is available in two types and four trim levels (S,L,G,E) and is equipped with a manual or automatic transmission.

=== Engine ===
This engine was originally introduced as the M15GSI. Among the changes applied to the M15+ engine is the use of an electric throttle as standard. One of the main visible changes to this engine is the VVT or variable valve timing system; an improved crankshaft damper, and also headers rather than a cast iron exhaust manifold. These changes increase the engine power from 87 to 90 hp (64 to 66 kW), torque from 114 to 137 N⋅m (84 to 101 lb⋅ft), while reducing fuel consumption by 7 percent. According to Saipa, the maximum horsepower of the new Saipa engine can be used at 4000 rpm, and the maximum torque is available to the driver at 2250 rpm. This engine meets Euro 5 emission standard and it is possible to adapt it to the Euro 6 emission standard.
