= Renault Pars =

Automobile manufacturer

Renault Pars Company
- Native name: شرکت رنو پارس
- Company type: Joint venture
- Industry: Automotive
- Founded: 24 March 2004
- Headquarters: Tehran, Iran
- Owner: Renault (51%); IDRO Group (49%)
- Website: renault-iran.com

Renault Pars (Persian: رنو پارس, Renou Pars, pronounced [ɾeˈnou ˈpɒːɾs]) is an Iranian joint venture established in 2004 and owned by Renault and Iran's Industrial Development Renovation Organisation (IDRO). The company is in charge of managing the assembly of CKD Renault cars by local manufacturers Iran Khodro and SAIPA's Pars Khodro.

== History ==
Renault cars were manufactured in Iran as early as December 1976, when a local company started the production of the Renault 5. However, several restrictions made difficult for Renault to manufacture locally. The restrictions were reduced in the 1990s and Iran SAIPA produced various Renault cars, including the 5 and the 21.

On 24 March 2004, Renault, IDRO and the Presidents of Iran Khodro and SAIPA signed the agreement which established Renault Pars. The company organises the assembly of imported CKD cars, but the engines are produced locally.

By 2018, Renault had left the Iranian market, but its cars were still being made by its local partners. By 2020 SAIPA (Pars Khodro's parent) was making an updated version of the original Dacia Logan called the SAIPA Renault Pars Tondar with over 85% of local parts, according to company CEO Javad Soleimani.

== Cars manufactured ==
- Renault L90 (2004–2019)
- Renault Pars Tondar (2012–2019) - also known as the SAIPA Renault Pars Tondar
- Renault Sandero (2015–2020)
- Renault Sandero Stepway (2016–2020)
