= Renault PK =

Pars Khodro PK
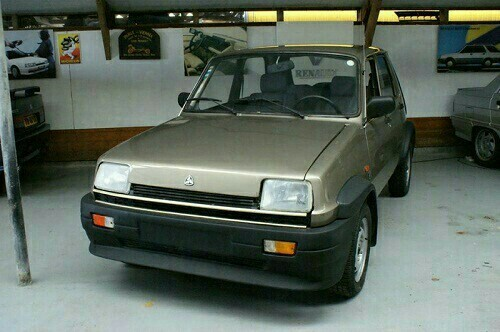

Overview
- Manufacturer: Pars Khodro
- Production: 2000–2005 (PK); 2005–2007 (New PK)
- Assembly: Iran: Tehran

Body and chassis
- Class: Supermini
- Body style: 5-door hatchback
- Related: Renault 5 Kia Pride

Chronology
- Predecessor: Sepand II

The PK and New PK are successive generations of a minicar manufactured and marketed by Pars Khodro for model years 2000-2007 using the body of the first-generation Renault 5 and the engine of the Kia Pride. "PK" is an acronym for Pars Khodro.

After 24 years of manufacture of the Renault 5 as the Sepand in Iran by SAIPA, and subsequently Pars Khodro, from 1976 to 2000, Pars Khodro combined the first generation Renault 5 body and Kia Pride underpinnings. The Renault 5 bodywork was modified and features were added, including air conditioning. The result was the PK, which was manufactured until superseded by the New PK in 2005.

The New PK was a mild facelift of the PK, again using the chassis of the first generation Renault 5 combined with the drivetrain from Kia Pride.

Manufacturing of the New PK commenced in 2005, featuring minor revisions from the PK models, e.g., enlarged taillights and bodywork largely similar to the Renault 5. Production was ended in 2007.

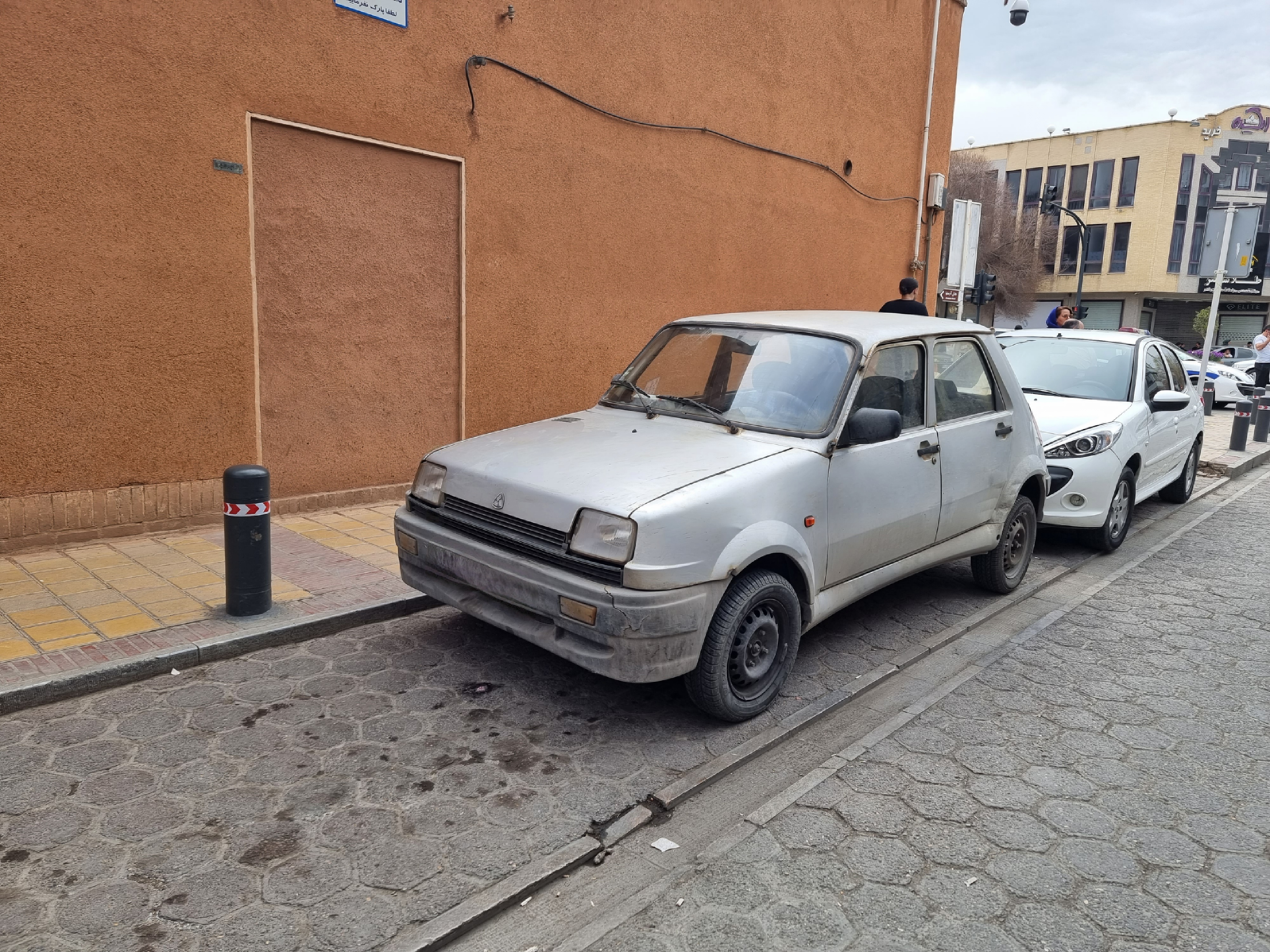
Pars Khodro New PK (facelift)

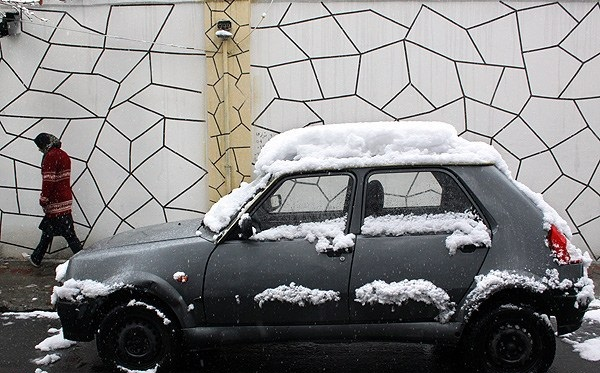
Side view; note the high ground clearance

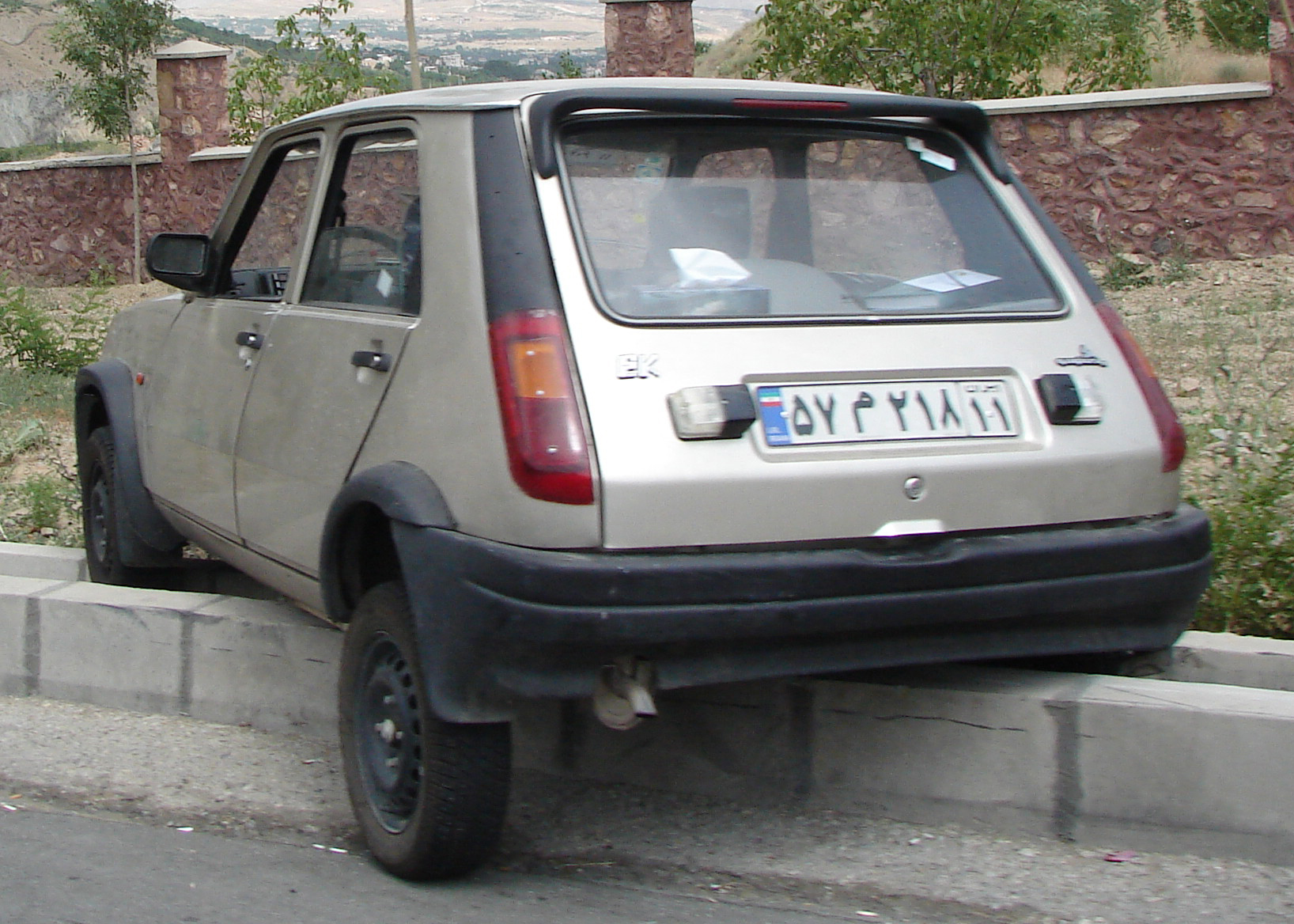
Rear view
