= Saipa Saina =

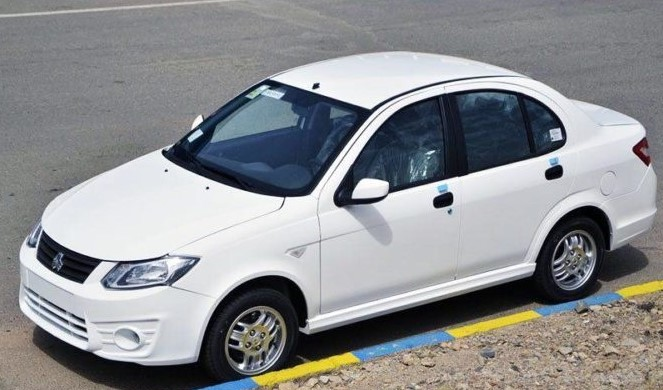

Overview
- Manufacturer: Saipa
- Also called: Pars Khodro Sahand
- Production: 2016–Present
- Model years: 2017–Present
- Assembly: Iran

Body and chassis
- Body style: 4-door Sedan
- Layout: Front-engine, front-wheel-drive layout
- Platform: X200
- Related: Saipa Quik

Powertrain
- Engine: Mega Motor SOHC 4-Cylinder 1500cc M15
- Transmission: 5-speed manual; 6-speed CVT

Dimensions
- Wheelbase: 2,415 mm (95.1 in)
- Length: 4,215 mm (165.9 in)
- Width: 1,663 mm (65.5 in)
- Height: 1,484 mm (58.4 in)
- Curb weight: 1,050 kg (2,315 lb)

Chronology
- Predecessor: Saipa Tiba
- Successor: Saipa Sahand

The Saipa Saina (Persian: ساینا) is a subcompact sedan (B) produced by Iranian automaker Saipa. Saina is a facelifted version of Saipa Tiba which is ultimately based on Kia Pride. Saina is part of Saipa's X200 platform and is powered by a modified Kia Pride engine. Saina is available in four trims: EX, SX, SE-A And SE-A Lux.

Saina is a product of platform management in SAIPA Group. This automobile can complete the expectations of many Iranian families. Ergonomic design, acceptable appearance and state of the art suspension system are important features of this car. Saina passes Euro IV European Emission Standards with 1.5 L Engine and is equipped with ABS and EBD brake system. These features make Saina an ideal car to provide 0-60 of driving pleasure.

== 2020 facelift ==
Saipa introduced the first Saina facelift on May 31, 2020. Unlike the previous generation, Saina has the Euro 5 emission standard in this version. Also, Saina's electrical platform has been changed to BCM system. According to Saipa, this car has been replaced by Sahand from 2024.

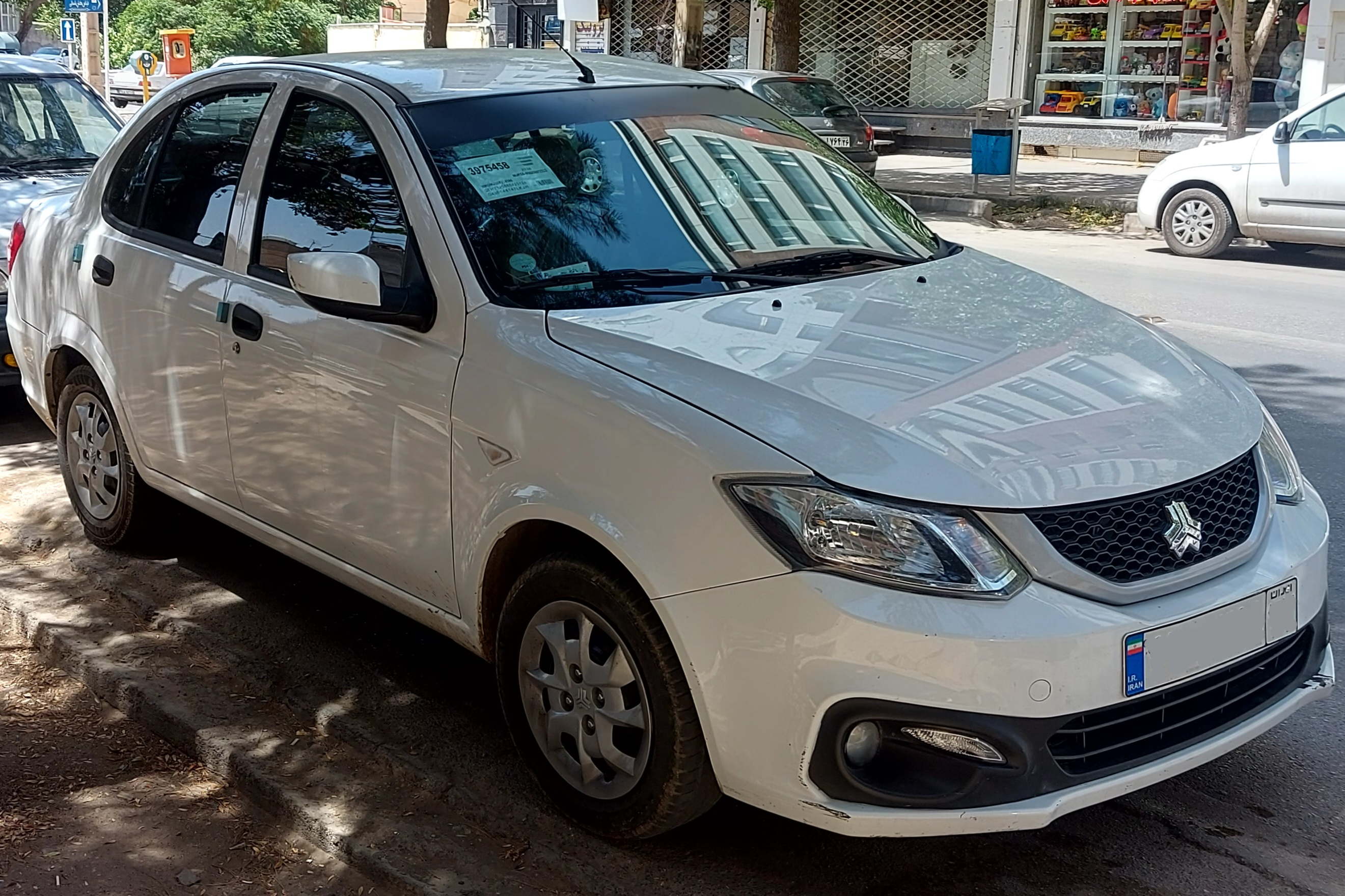
front view

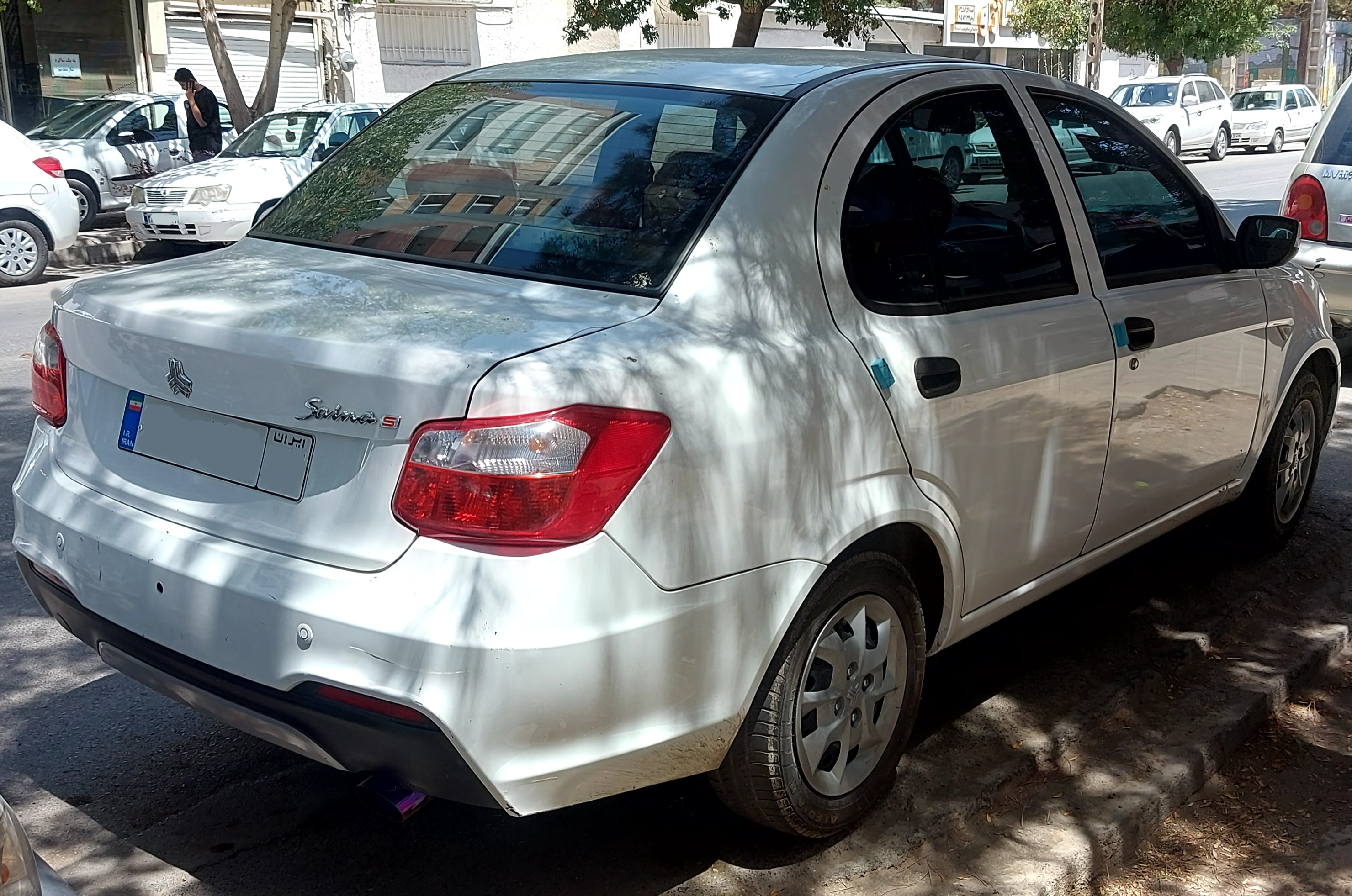
rear view

== Saina EV ==
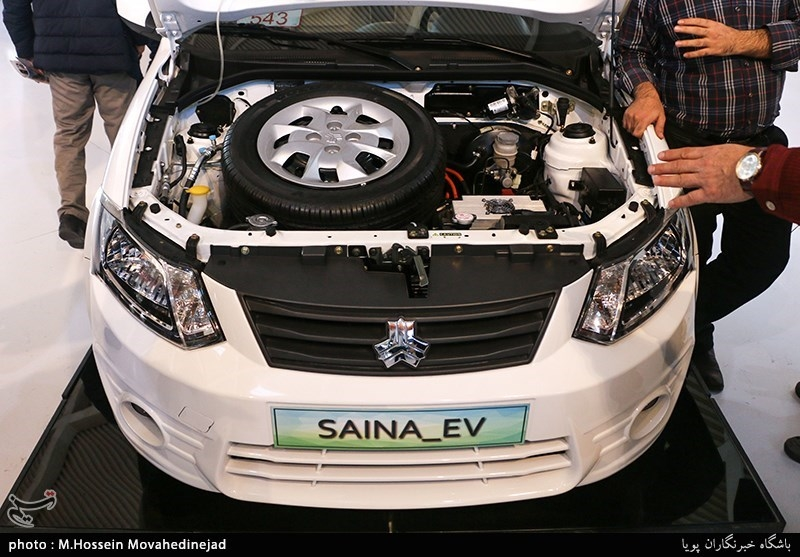
Saina EV

Saipa unveiled an all-electric battery-powered version of Saina in 2018. It was designed and developed in a partnership with KNTU. Saipa announced its plan to mass-produce the electric version, but it was halted after new sanctions against Iran. It takes 40 minutes to supercharge the EV. Saina EV has a 170 km estimated range.

== Saipa Sahand ==
In fact, Saipa Sahand is the second generation of Saina, which was introduced on 2022-08-31 and was released to the market in the following year (2023). The Sahand engine has Euro 5 emission standard (and can be upgraded to Euro 6) and is able The power generation is 92 HP and the torque is 137 NM. The fuel consumption of this car is approximately 6.98L per hundred kilometers. Also, the mass of this car is about 250 kg (550 pounds) heavier than Saina. This car replaced Saina in 2023.

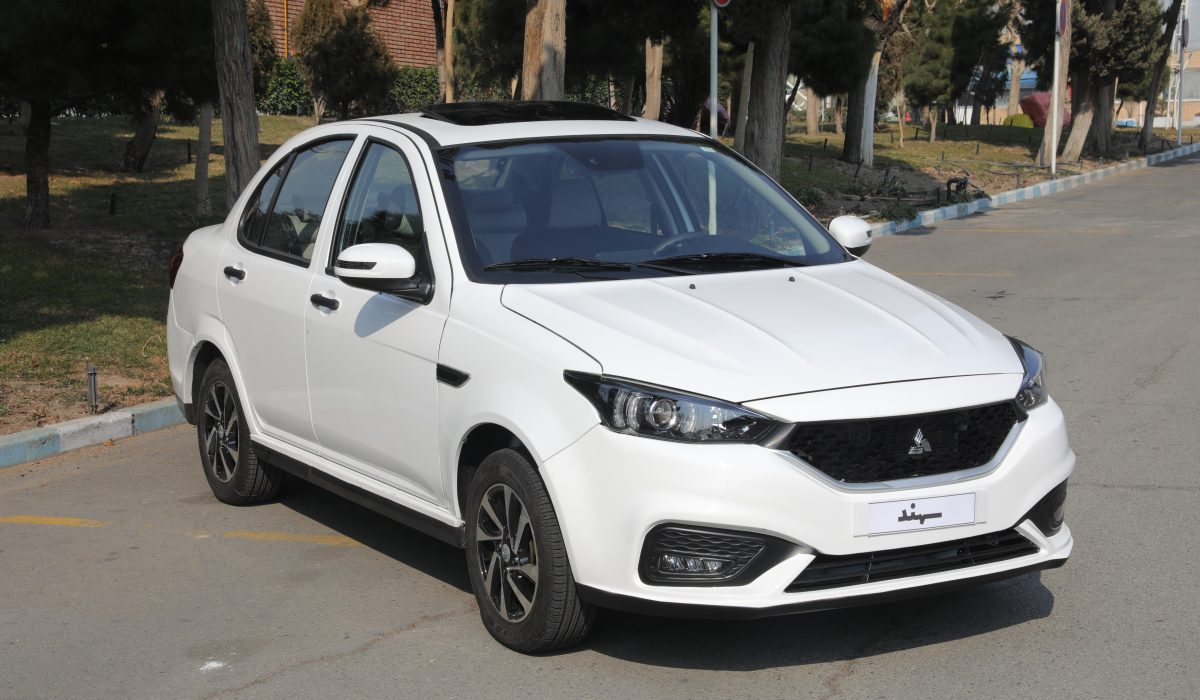
Saipa Sahand

== Engine ==
| Engine | Displacement | Power | Torque | Source |
|---|---|---|---|---|
| I4 | 1503 cc | 87 hp (65 kW; 88 PS) | 128 N⋅m (94 lb⋅ft) | |

== Features ==
- Driver and passenger airbags
- Air-conditioning
- Anti-theft immobilizer
- ABS + EBD brake
- Remote central locking
- Front power windows
- Foldable side mirrors adjustable from inside
- Rear windshield defrosting
- Windscreen wipers with adjustable speed
- Digital dashboard display
- Front seatbelts with adjustable height
- Seatbelt with pretensioners
- Parking sensor
- Front lamps with leveling switch
- Remote central lock
- Foldable rear seat with ISOFIX (children seat)
- Outside temperature display
- Rear power window (optional)
- Digital air-conditioning (optional)
- Audio (CD, radio and Mp3)
