= Saipa 111 =

Automobile

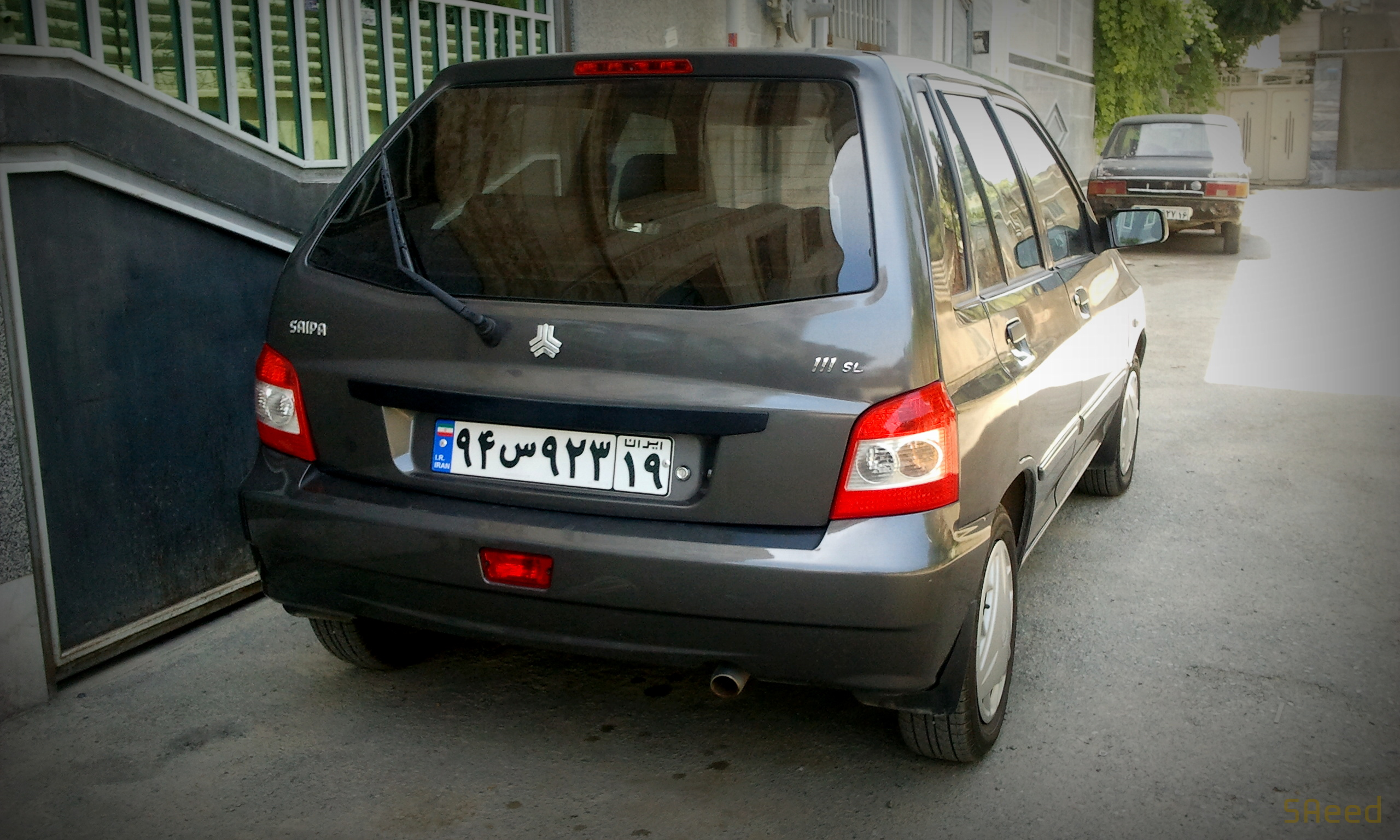
Saipa 111

The Saipa 111 is a small, entry level hatchback car produced in 2010 by SAIPA in Iran. It is actually a hatchback model of SAIPA 132 modified by SAIPA R&D center.

== Specifications ==
- Engine: 4 cylinder in line, SOHC
- Engine displacement: 1.3 litre
- Max power: 63hp @ 5200 rpm
- Gearbox: 5 speed manual
- Fuel tank capacity: 37 litre
- Fuel consumption in extra urban: 5.6 litres per 100km
- Fuel consumption in urban: 6.9 litres per 100km
- Length: 3935mm
- Width: 1605mm
- Height: 1455mm
