= Brilliance H230 =

Subcompact car

Brilliance H220/H230
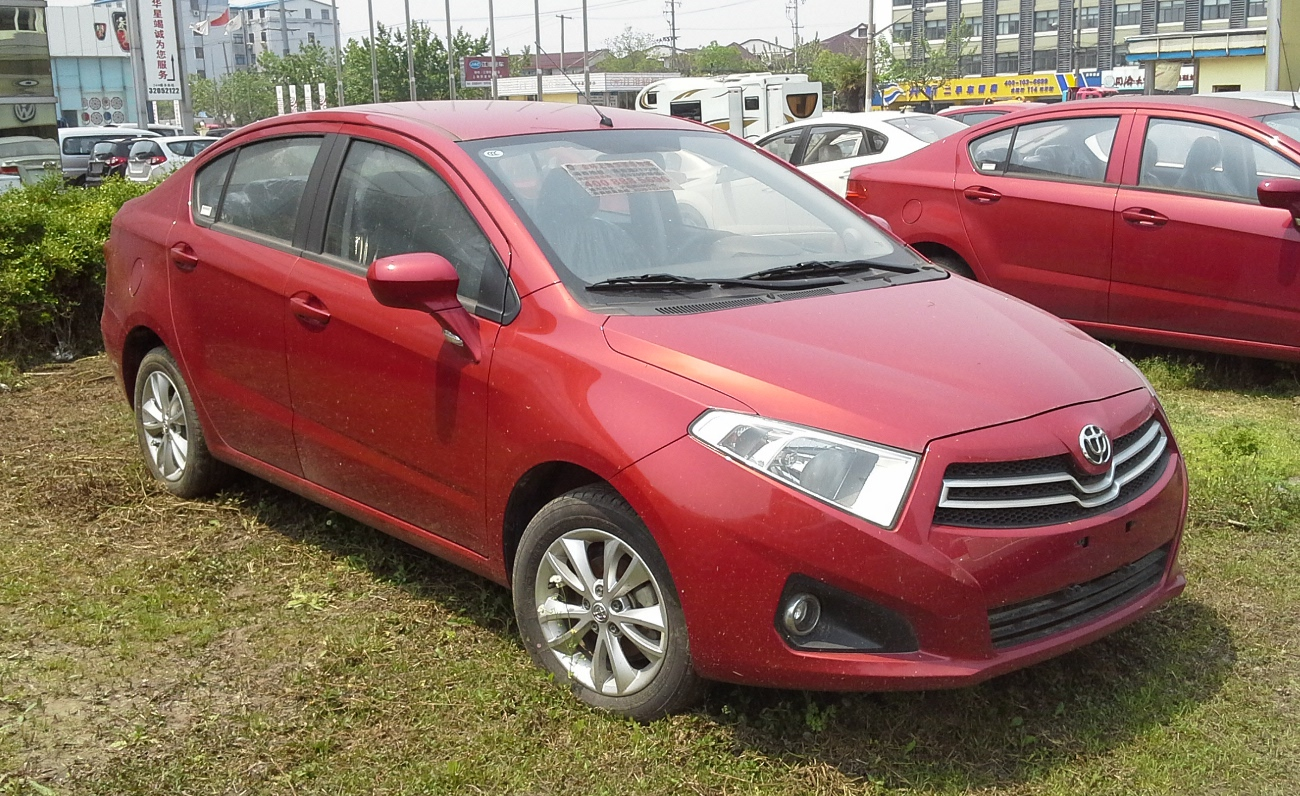

Overview
- Manufacturer: Brilliance Auto
- Also called: Brilliance H220 (hatchback); Brilliance H230EV (electric sedan); Pars Khodro H230 (Iran)
- Production: 2012–2020 (H230EV sedan); 2012–2017 (H230 sedan); 2013–2017 (H220 hatchback)
- Assembly: Shenyang, Liaoning, China; 6th of October City, Egypt (BAG)

Body and chassis
- Class: Subcompact (B)
- Body style: 4 door sedan 5-door hatchback
- Layout: Front-engine, front-wheel-drive
- Related: Brilliance V3

Powertrain
- Engine: 1.5 L BM15L I4 (petrol)
- Transmission: 5-speed manual 6 speed automatic

Dimensions
- Wheelbase: 2,570 mm (101.2 in)
- Length: 4,390 mm (172.8 in) (sedan); 4,190 mm (165.0 in) (hatchback)
- Width: 1,703 mm (67.0 in) (sedan); 1,703 mm (67.0 in) (hatchback)
- Height: 1,482 mm (58.3 in)

The Brilliance H230 sedan and Brilliance H220 hatchback duo are subcompact cars (B) produced by Chinese automobile manufacturer Brilliance Auto positioned under the Brilliance H330 and Brilliance H320 compact cars. Brilliance H230 sedan debuted on the 2012 Beijing Auto Show and was launched on the market in August 2012, while the Brilliance H220 hatchback was launched at the 2013 Shanghai Auto Show and was launched in the Chinese car market in the second half of 2013.

== Brilliance H230 and H230EV ==
The Brilliance H230 sedan was launched on the Chinese car market in August 2012 as the base for the H220 hatchback and the later revealed H230EV sedan. The H230EV sedan is the electric version of the H230 subcompact sedan with prices starting from 179,800.

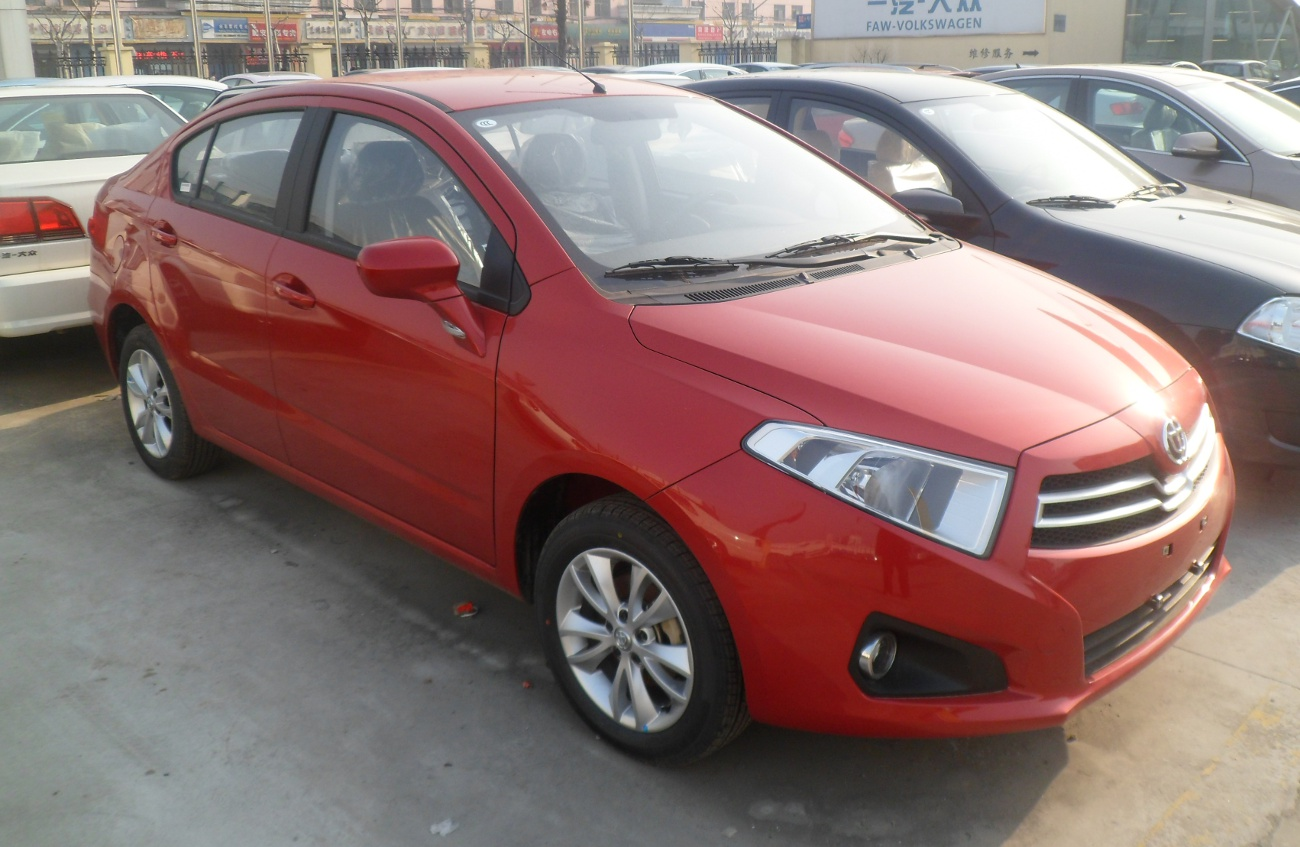
Brilliance H230 front

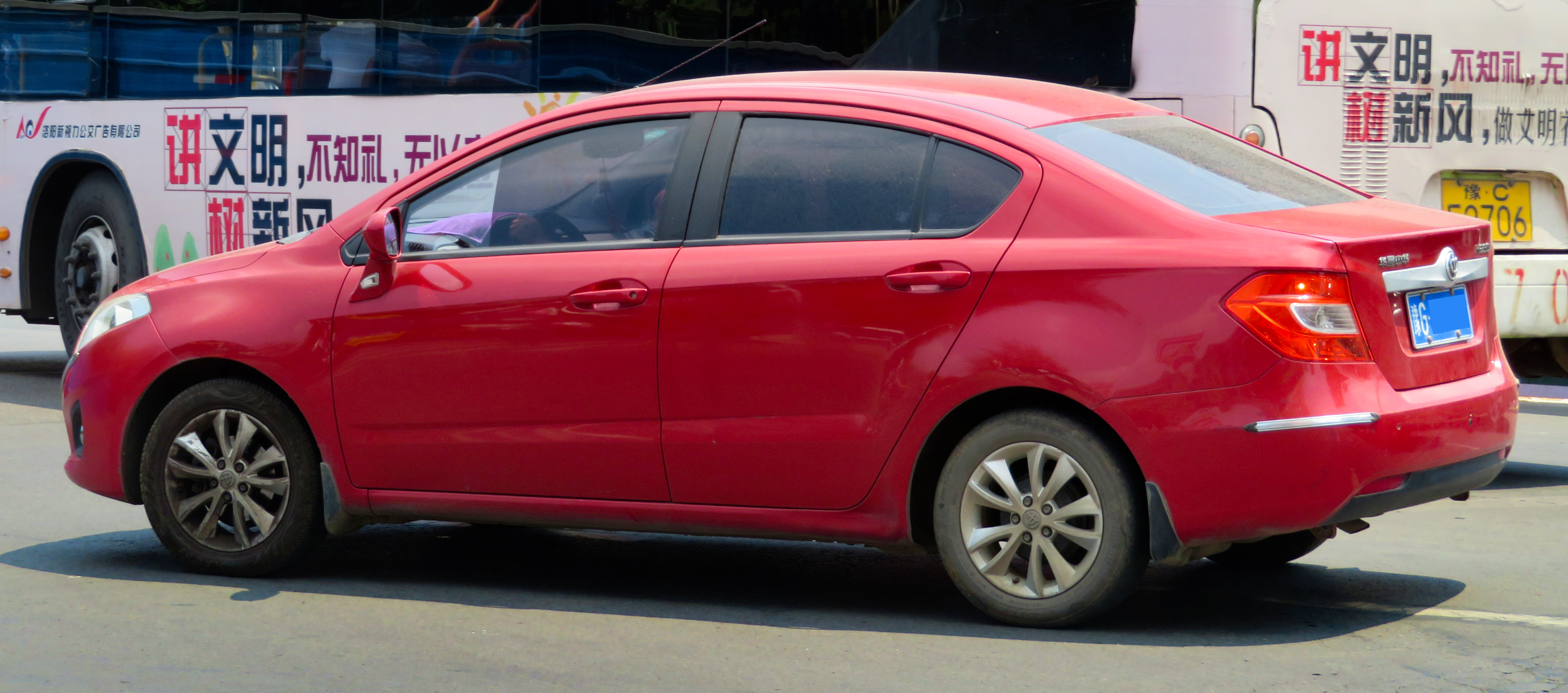
Brilliance H230 rear

== Brilliance H220 ==
The Brilliance H220 hatchback was launched on the China car market in November 2013 sharing everything in front of the C-pillars with the Brilliance H230 subcompact sedan. Prices starts from 54,800 yuan to 67,800 yuan.

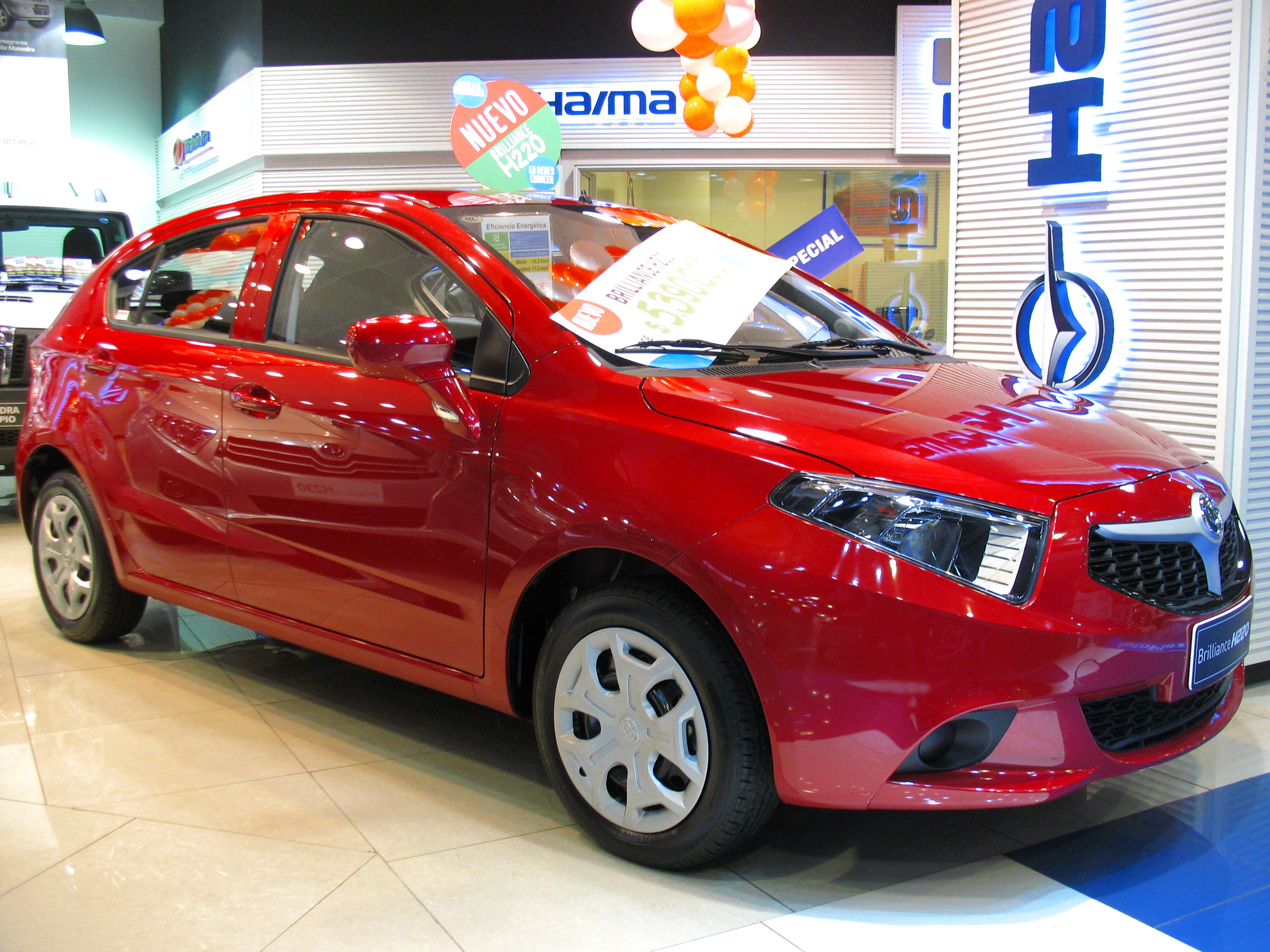
Brilliance H220 front

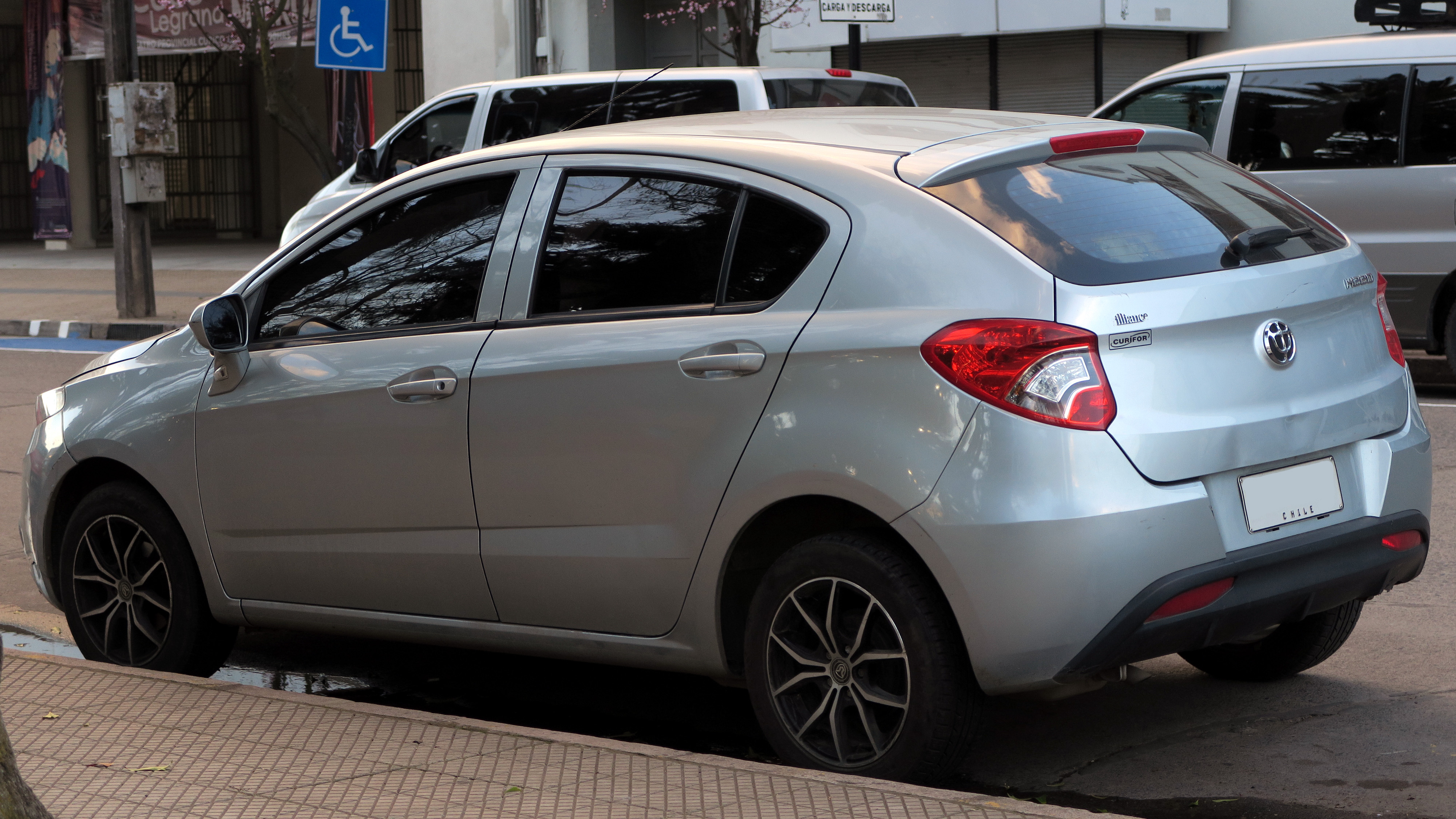
Brilliance H220 rear
