= Saipa Quik =

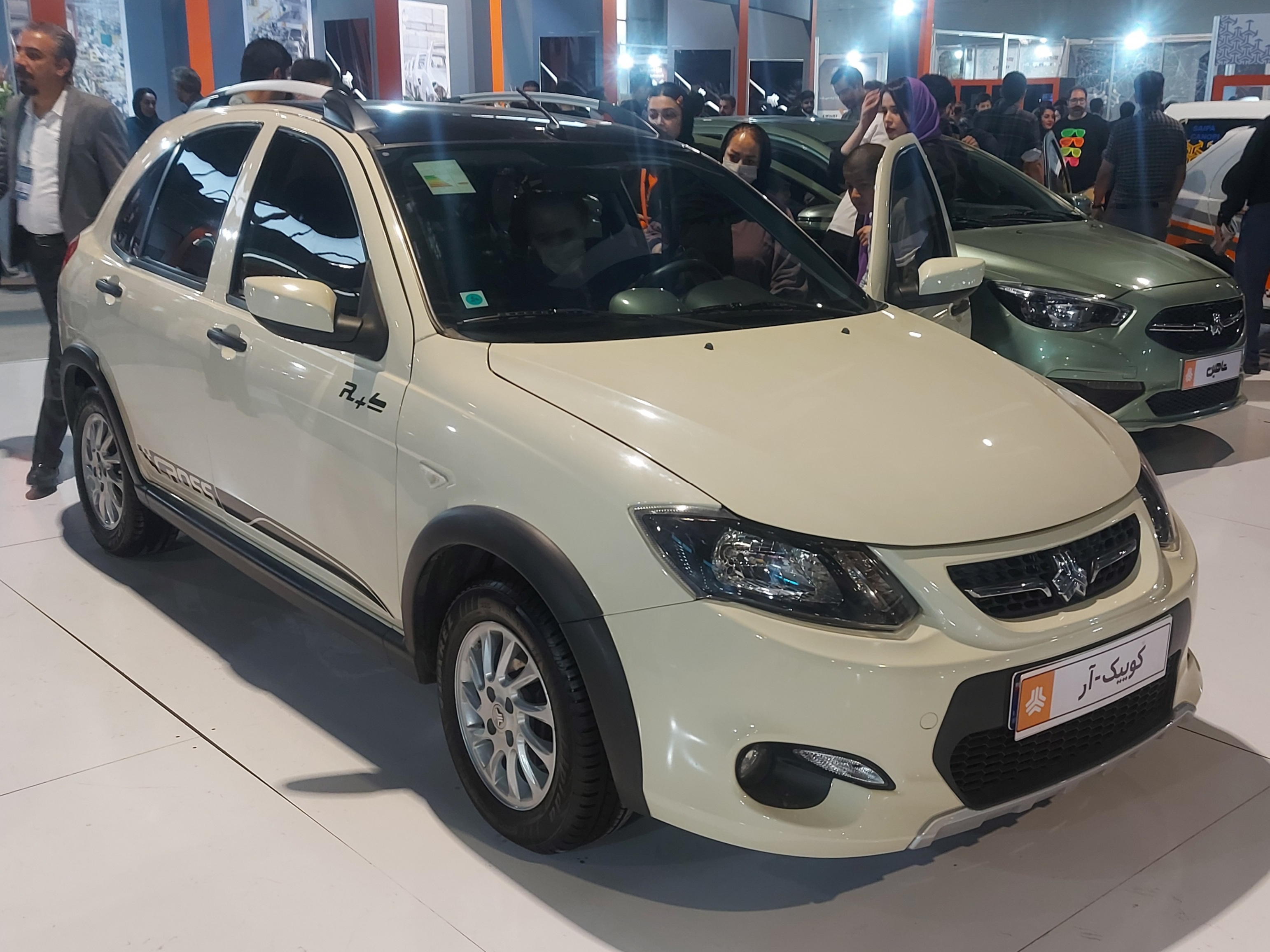
- Saipa Quik R+

Overview
- Manufacturer: Saipa
- Production: 2018–present
- Assembly: Iran

Body and chassis
- Body style: 5-door hatchback
- Layout: Front-engine, front-wheel-drive layout
- Platform: X200
- Related: Saipa Saina

Powertrain
- Engine: 1503cc M15
- Transmission: 5-speed manual; cvt Automatic

Dimensions
- Wheelbase: 2,412 mm (95.0 in)
- Length: 4,005 mm (157.7 in)
- Width: 1,688 mm (66.5 in)
- Height: 1,492 mm (58.7 in); 1,533 mm (60.4 in) (With the load)
- Curb weight: 1,063 kg (2,344 lb)

Chronology
- Predecessor: Saipa Tiba2
- Successor: Saipa Atlas

Saipa Quik (Persian: سایپا کوییک) is a small family car built by the Iranian car manufacturer Saipa from 2017. It is the hatchback version of "Saina", a sedan also made by Saipa.

== Overview ==
In English, "quick" means fast and agile. Also, Quik is a name of a tribe of Kurds in Iranian Kurdistan and there are some villages with this name in that region.

=== Powertrain ===
The car has an automatic CVT transmission, with a Euro 4 fuel system upgradeable to Euro 5. The engine is a 1.5 L I4 and its maximum power is 87 hp (65 kW).

Engine	Type	Displacement	Power	Torque	Transmission
M15 16-valve SOHC	I4	1503 cc	87 hp (65 kW; 88 PS)	128 N⋅m (94 lb⋅ft)	5-speed manual or cvt Automatic

=== Automatic Gearbox Version ===
A version of Quik has an automatic transmission, which is why Quik has been able to claim the title of the cheapest automatic car in Iran.

== Saipa Atlas ==
The Saipa Atlas is an improved version of the Quik, being launched in December 2022.
