= Saipa Tiba =

Tiba (S81)
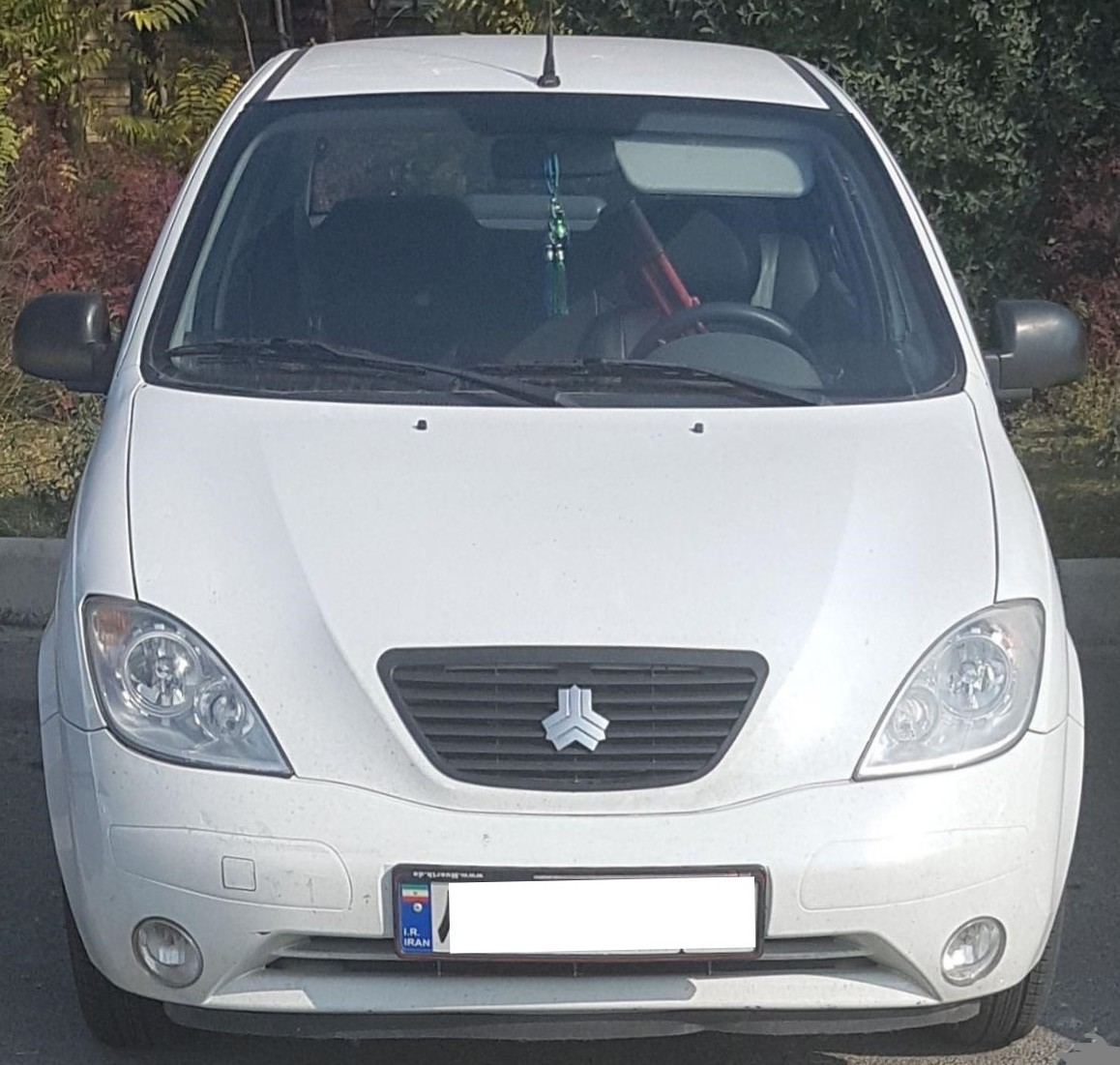

Overview
- Manufacturer: SAIPA
- Also called: S81; Miniature; Wallyscar 619+/190
- Production: 2009–2022 (Tiba sedan); 2013–2022 (Tiba 2 hatchback)
- Assembly: Kashan, Iran

Body and chassis
- Class: Subcompact (B)
- Body style: 4-door saloon, 5-door hatchback
- Layout: Front engine, Front-wheel drive
- Platform: Saipa X200 platform
- Related: KIA Pride, KIA RIO, Geely CK

Powertrain
- Engine: Inline-4 1.5 L Saipa M15 petrol

Dimensions
- Wheelbase: 2,410 mm (94.9 in)
- Length: 4,105 mm (161.6 in)
- Width: 1,635 mm (64.4 in)
- Height: 1,484 mm (58.4 in)
- Curb weight: 1,013 kg (2,233 lb)

Chronology
- Predecessor: KIA Pride
- Successor: Saipa Saina (sedan); Saipa Quick (hatchback)

The Tiba (project name: S81) is an Iranian car made by Saipa, that was unveiled in December 2008 and originally named "Miniatur".

Price has been estimated to be less than 7,000 dollars. The car platform has been designed by Saipa, and its safety is reasonable. In its production the services of some 122 local manufacturers have been utilized and about 810 parts have been produced.

A new subsidiary, Saipa Kashan will take up production of the car. The share of Tiba in Saipa's exports is expected to be around 20 percent by 2011. Saipa Tiba is being sold in Ukraine since 2012.

Production of the car ended in 2022.

== Technical specifications ==
Engine	Power/RPM	Torque/RPM
SOHC 1.5L	87 hp (65 kW)/5200	128 N⋅m (94 lbf⋅ft)/3200

Based on a new X200 platform, the new engine has been designed according to this specification: 4-cylinder 80 hp 1503cc engine and 5-speed manual transmission, which have been both modified in size and power by the German FEV company, with a fuel economy of 42MPG (5.6L/100 km) in highways and 33MPG in the cities. (7.2L/100 km) The car is also relatively well-equipped, with a CD Player, anti-theft technology, customizable seat position and front light angle, and automatic front windows. In 2014, only 20% of all auto-parts used in the production of the Saipa Tiba cars were domestically manufactured.

The car's safety features are reasonable and equipped with driver's and passenger's airbag and an ABS have been installed on base-models. Along with other accessories such as automatic rear windows, auto-climate control, aluminum rims, and a remote control It could be ordered optionally during purchase.

== Tiba 2 ==
The Tiba 2 is the hatchback version of the Tiba.

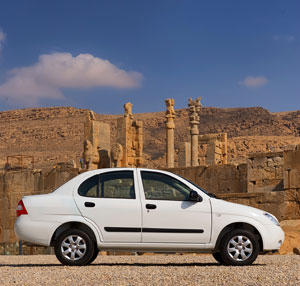
Tiba

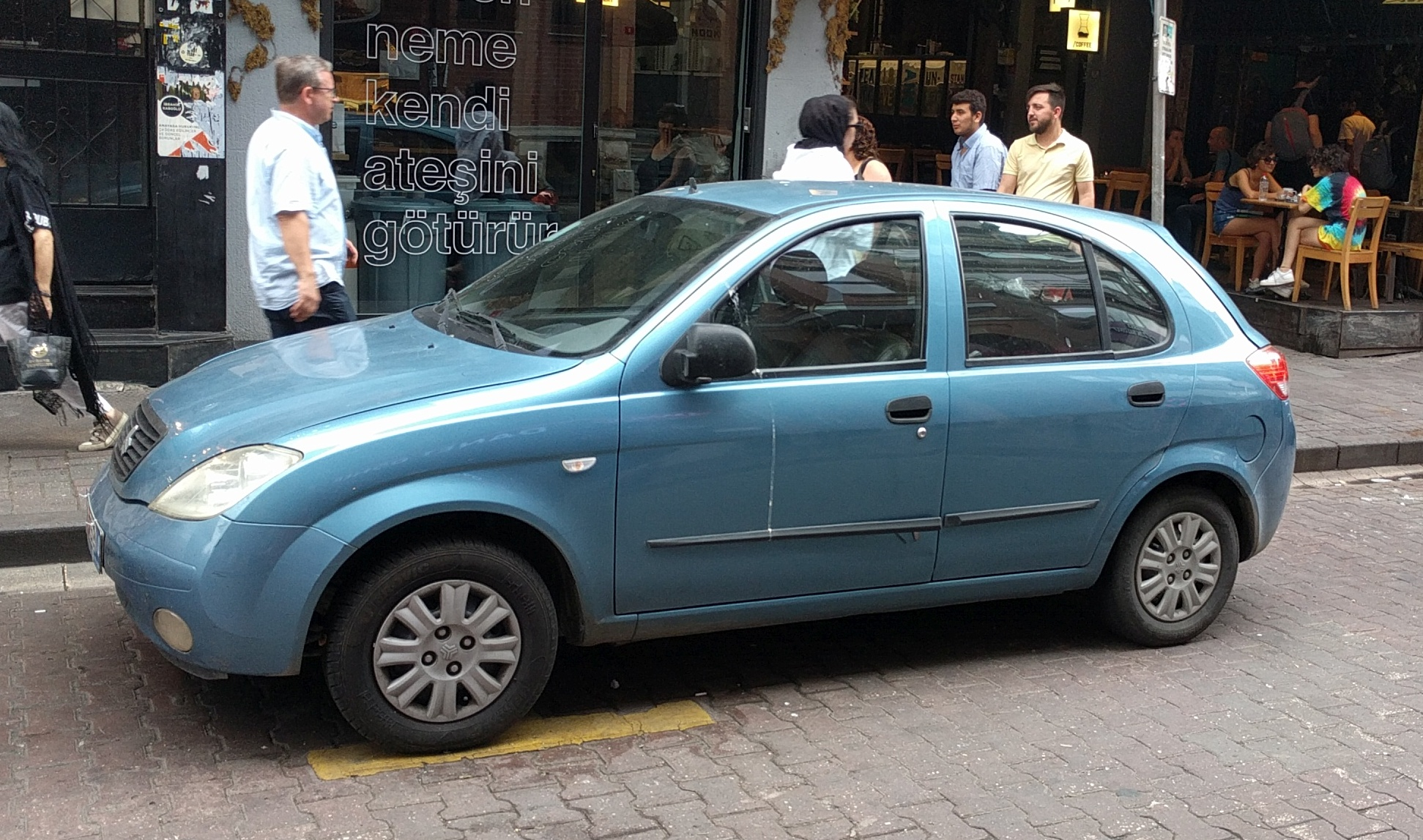
Tiba 2

== See also ==
- Saipa Group
- Iranian automobile industry
