= Kia Pride =

The Kia Pride is a subcompact car sold by the South Korean automobile manufacturer Kia Motors between March 1987 and January 2000, and again since September 2011. Between April 2005 and September 2011 the Kia New Pride had been sold.

Original models derived from the Ford Festiva and sold in South Korea and some export markets. Between 2005 and 2011, the New Pride was the South Korean market name for the Kia Rio JB sold in export markets. The Pride sold from 2011 to 2017 is also based on the Rio—this time the UB series. Various versions of the Pride family, including sedan, hatchback, liftback, station wagon and pickup, were produced in Iran between 1992 and 2020.

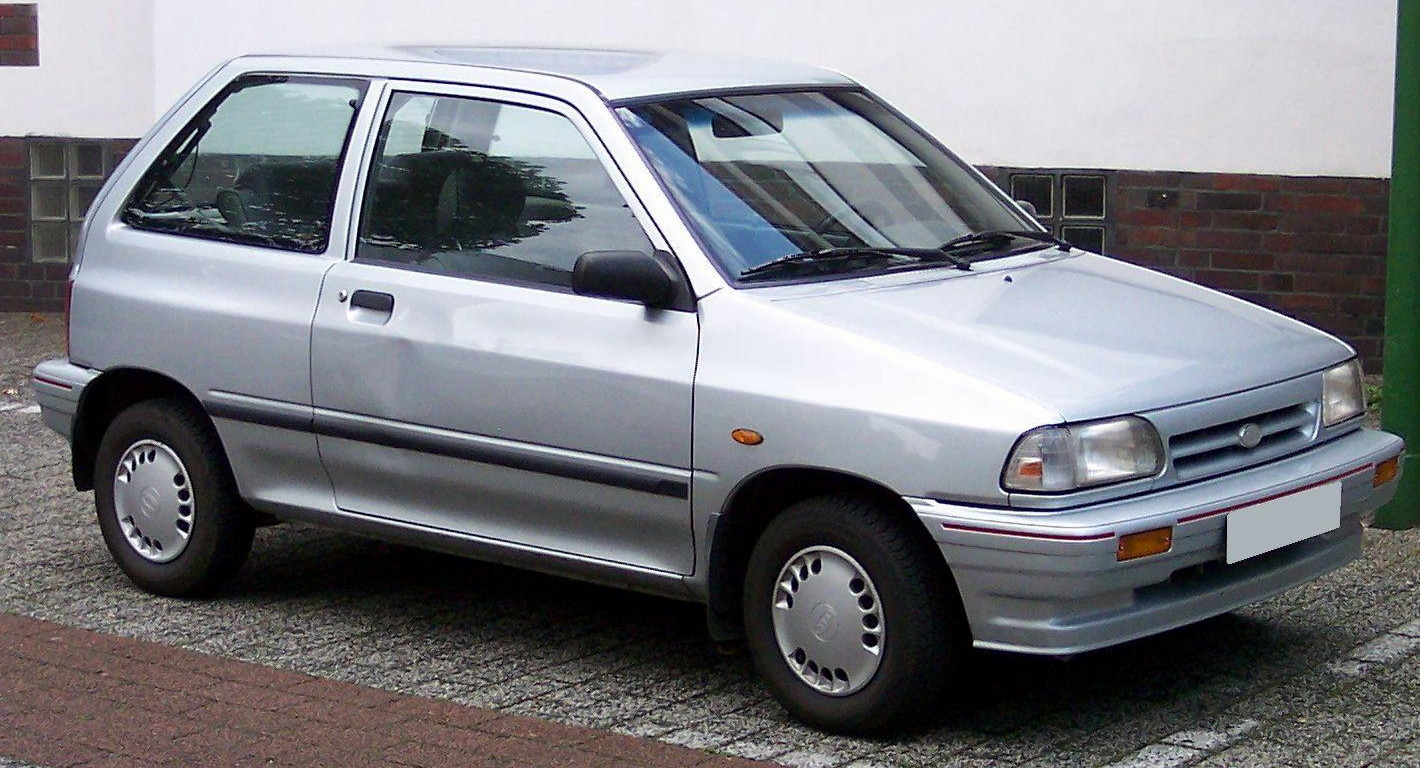
Kia Pride (1987–2000)

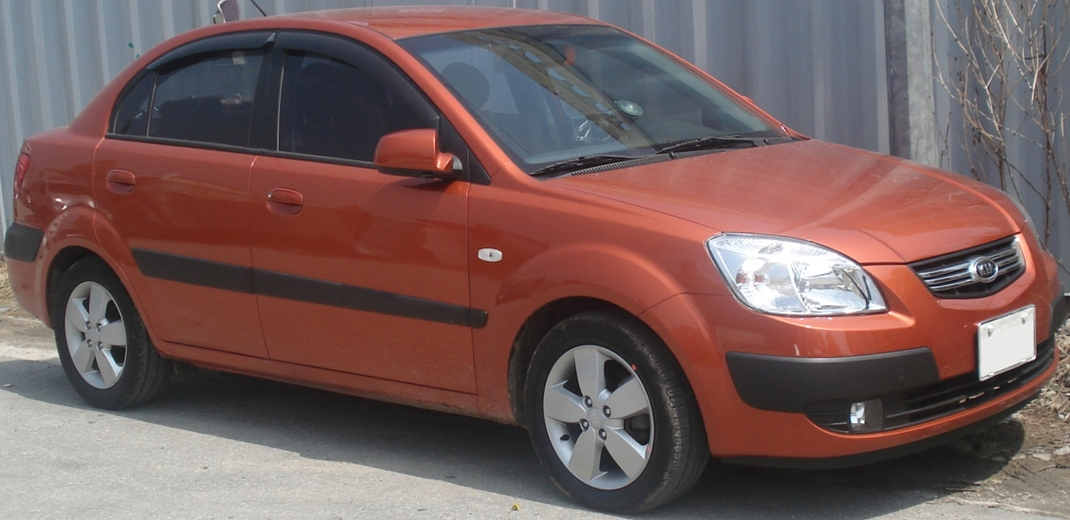
Kia New Pride (2005–2011)

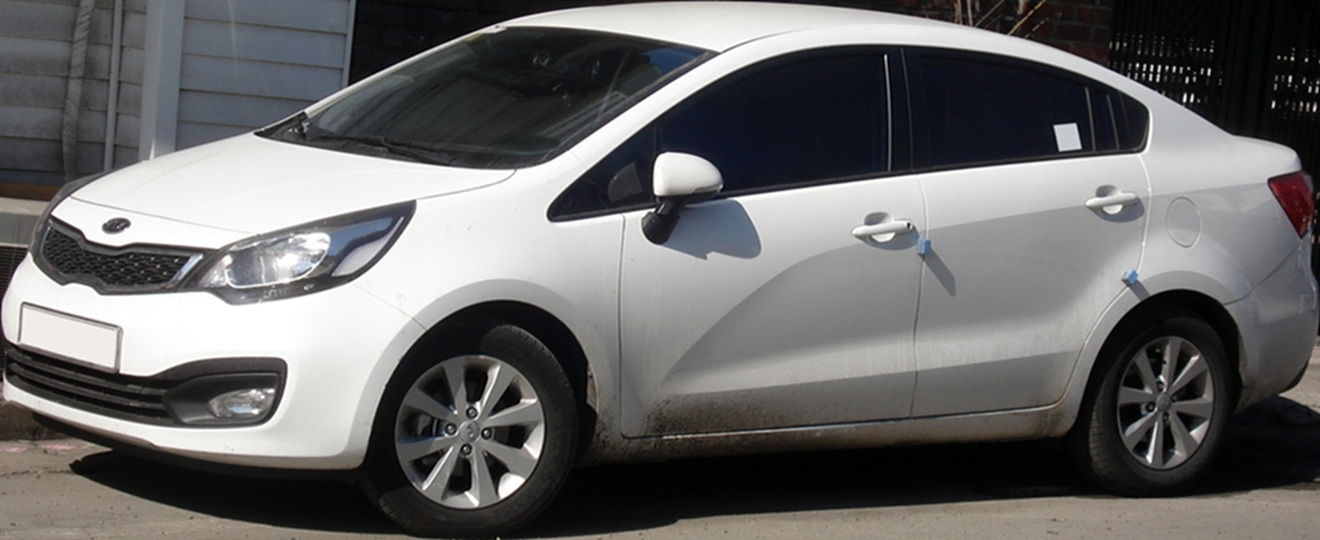
Kia Pride (2011–2017)

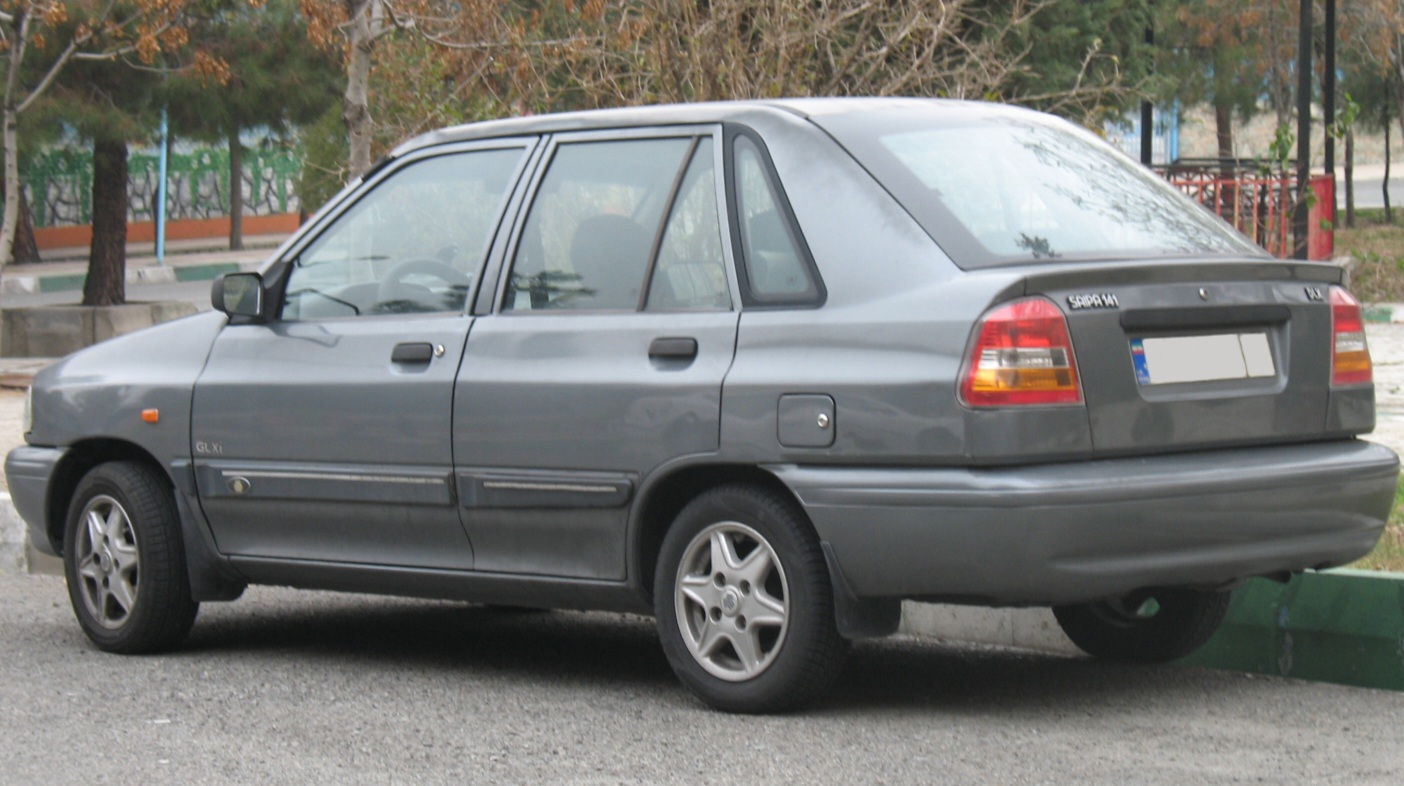
Saipa 141 - liftback variant

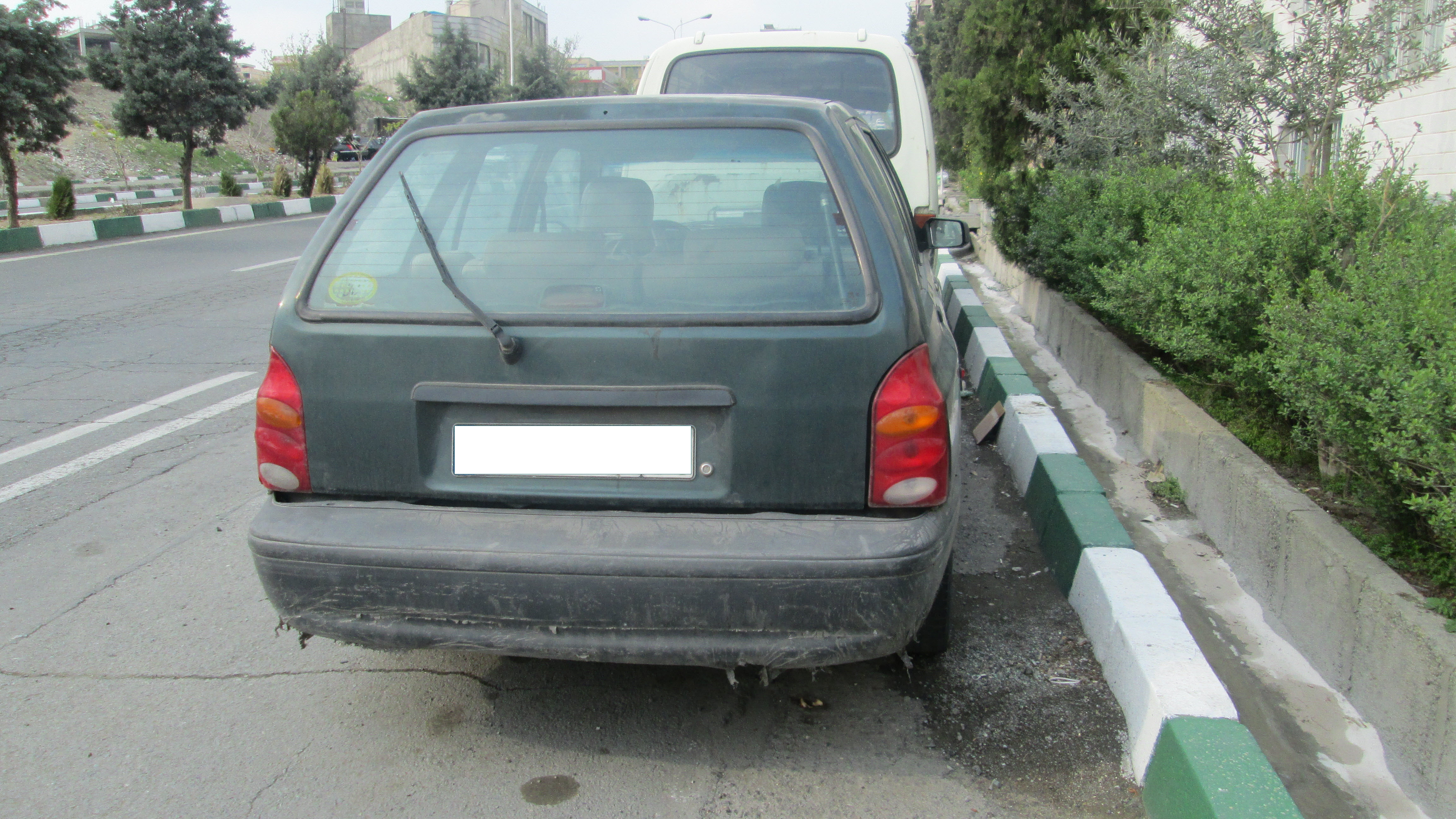
Saipa Safari - station wagon variant

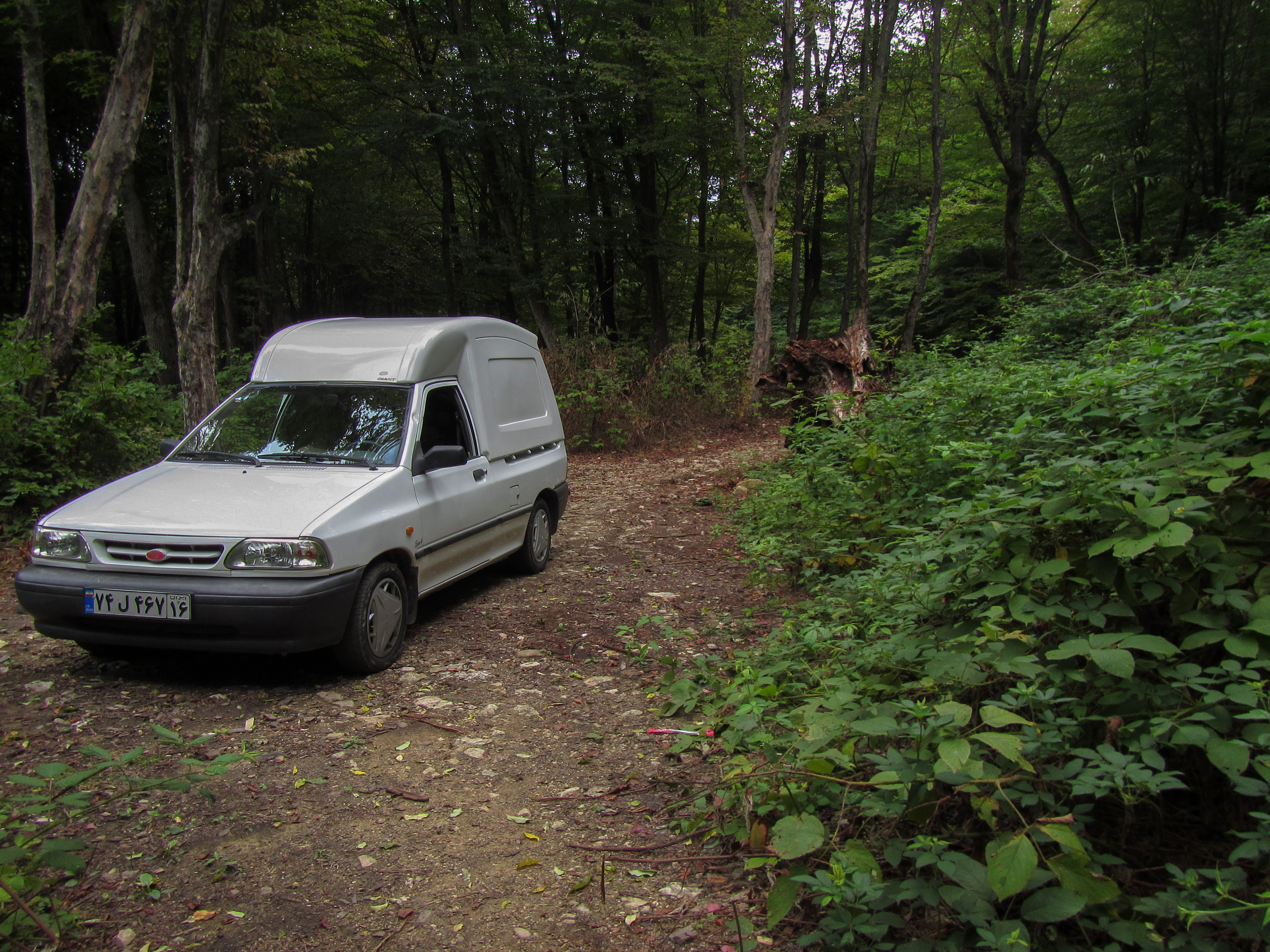
Saipa 151 - the pickup variant, here pictured with a back compartment

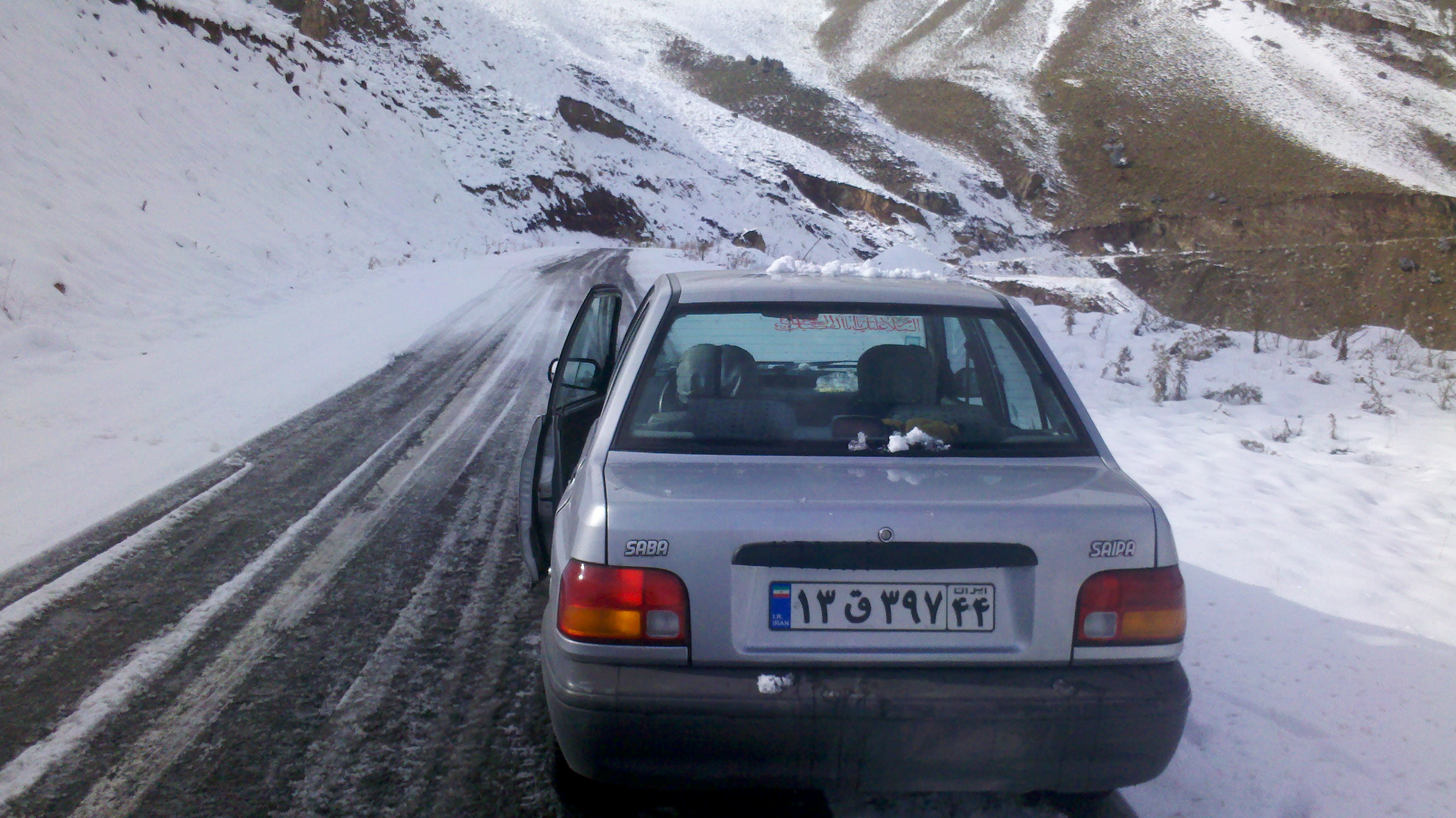
Saipa Saba - Kia Pride sedan version in Iran

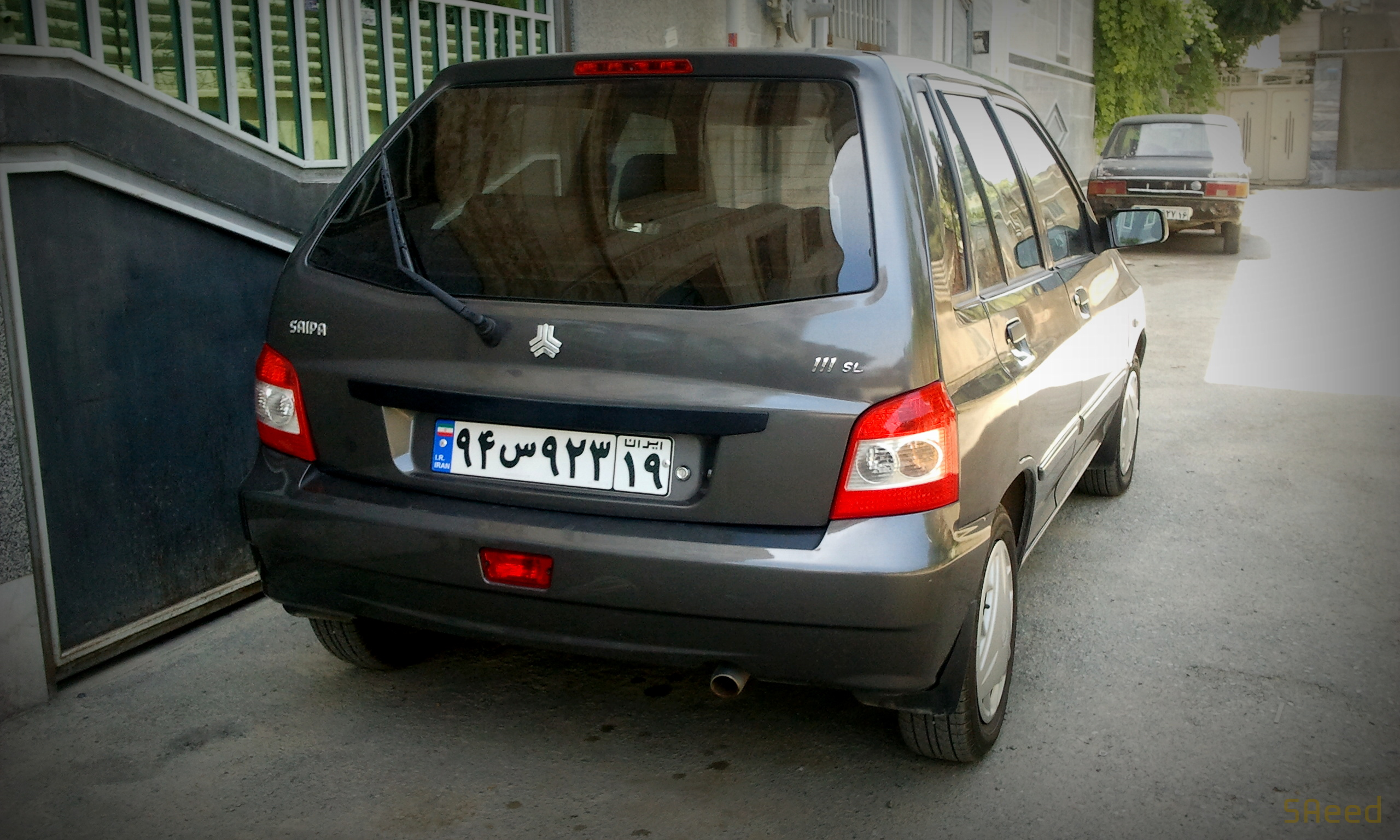
Saipa 111 - Iranian facelift of Pride hatchback
