= Rick Titus =

Rick Titus may refer to:

- Rick Titus (journalist), former racing driver and automotive journalist
- Rick Titus (soccer) (born 1969), former soccer player and head coach
