= Ford Festiva =

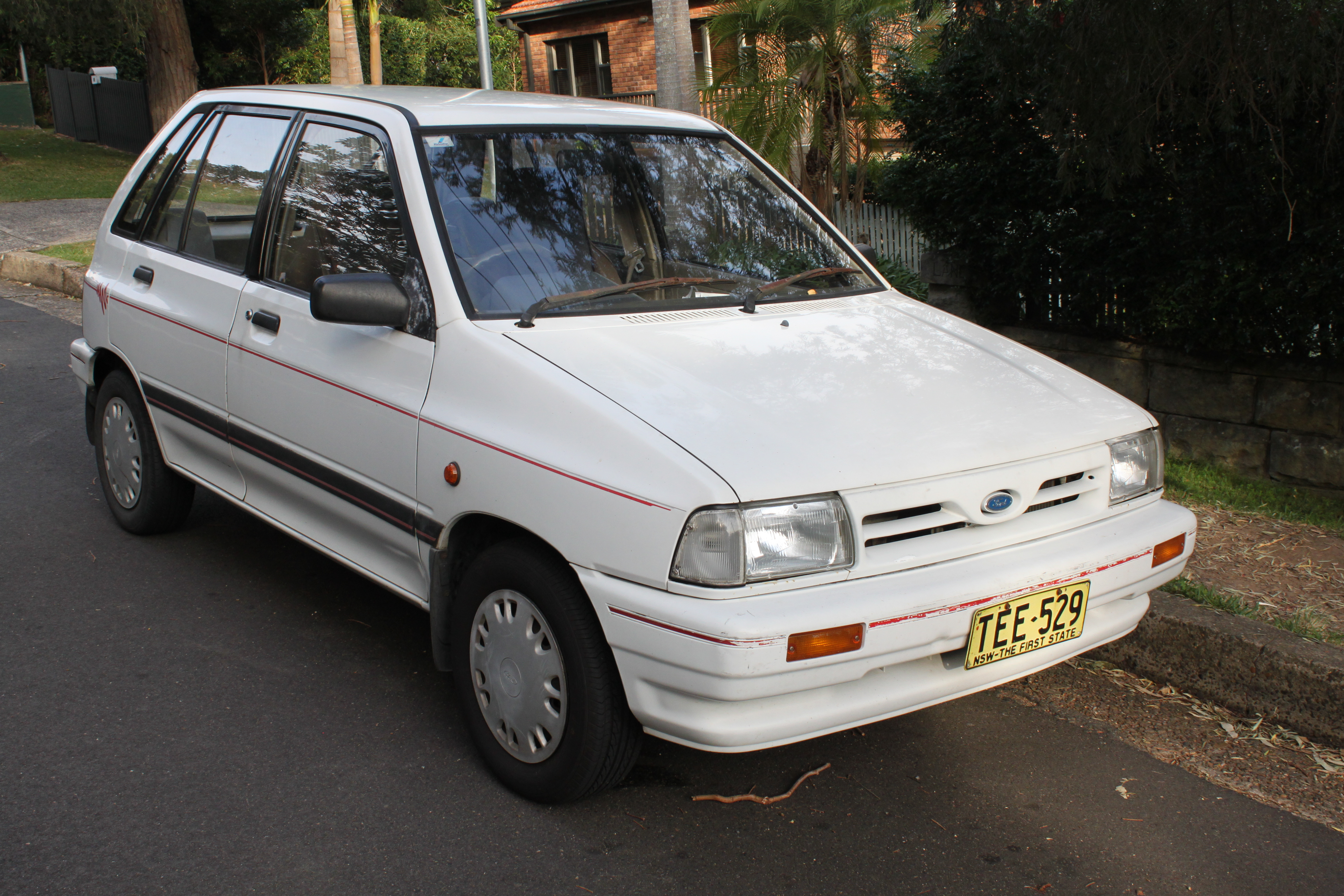
- 1992 Ford Festiva (WA) 5-door hatchback (Australia)

Overview
- Manufacturer: Kia; Mazda; SAIPA
- Production: 1986–2002

Body and chassis
- Class: Subcompact car
- Layout: Front-engine, front-wheel drive

Chronology
- Predecessor: Ford Fiesta
- Successor: Ford Fiesta

The Ford Festiva is a four passenger front-drive subcompact car originally manufactured in South Korea by Kia, under license from Mazda and marketed by Ford from 1986 until 2002 over three generations in Japan as the Festiva. The first generation was also sold as a Festiva in North America, while the first two generations were Festivas in Australasia. The third generation was a badge engineered Mazda Demio and was generally not available with Ford badging outside of Japan.

Designed and engineered by Mazda using the DA platform and B series straight-four engines, the Festiva was manufactured in South Korea by Kia, under license. Sales of the first generation Festiva reached 350,000 in America.

Kia began marketing the first generation in South Korea under license — as the Kia Pride. Australasia and Europe received the first version between 1987 and 1991 as the "Mazda 121". After 1991, Australasian sales began under the "Ford Festiva" name, while European sales continued as the "Kia Pride". Kia ended production of the Pride in 2000.

Ongoing production of the first generation overlapped its second generation, introduced in 1993 and marketed as the Ford Aspire in North America and as the Kia Avella in South Korea and other markets. The second generation was marketed for model years 1993–2000, and a third generation was sold between 1996 and 2002 in Japan as a badge-engineered version of the Mazda Demio.

The "Festiva" nameplate derived from the Spanish word for "festive".

== First generation (WA; 1986) ==
First generation
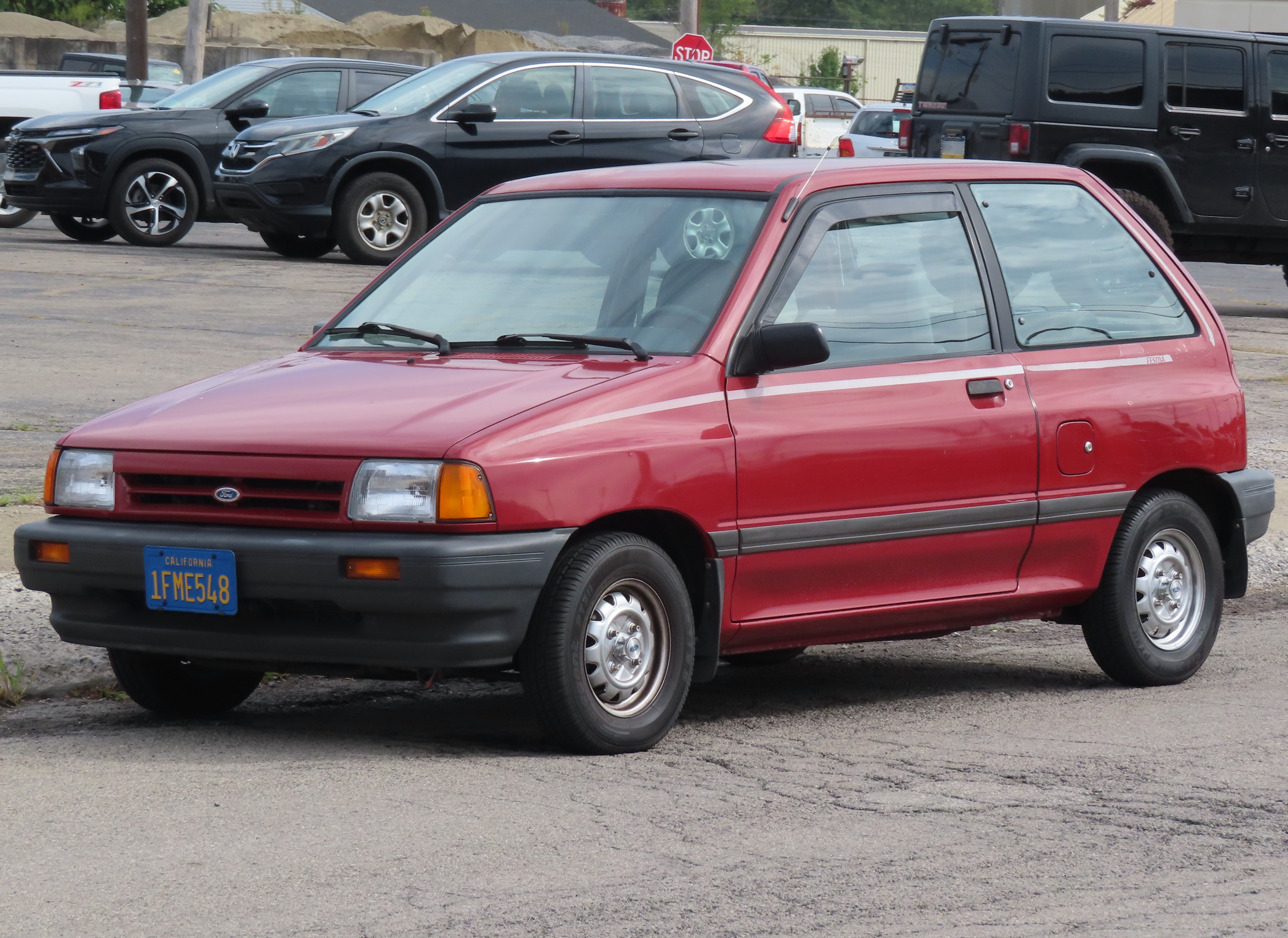

Overview
- Also called: Guangtong GTQ5010X (China); Kia Classic (Pakistan); Kia Pride (South Korea); Mazda 121; Saipa Nasim/111 (hatchback; Iran); Saipa Saba/131/132 (sedan; Iran); Saipa 141 (liftback; Iran); Saipa 151 (pick-up; Iran); Saipa Safari (station wagon; Iran); Venirauto Turpial (Venezuela); Wallys 619 / 216 (Tunisia)
- Production: 1986–1990 (Mazda); 1986–2000 (Kia); 1993–2020 (SAIPA); 1997–2003 (Dongfeng Yueda Kia); 1998–2002 (AAV); 2021–2024))) (Wallyscar)
- Assembly: Japan (Mazda); South Korea: Sohari Plant, Gwangmyeong (Kia); Gwangju Plant, Gwangju (Kia); China: Zhuhai, Guangdong (Guangtong); Jiangsu (Dongfeng Yueda); Egypt: Cairo (AAV); Iran: Tehran (SAIPA); Iraq: Iskandariya (SAIPA); Philippines: Parañaque (Columbian Autocar Corporation); Taiwan: (Ford Lio Ho); Venezuela: Valencia (Ford Motor de Venezuela)

Body and chassis
- Body style: 2-door coupe utility (SAIPA); 3-door hatchback 4-door sedan 5-door hatchback 5-door liftback (SAIPA); 5-door wagon
- Platform: Mazda DA platform

Powertrain
- Engine: 1138 cc Mazda B1 I4; 1290 cc Mazda BJ I4; 1324 cc Mazda B3 I4
- Transmission: 3-speed Mazda F3A automatic 4-speed manual 5-speed manual

Dimensions
- Wheelbase: 2,295 mm (90.4 in)
- Length: 3,475 mm (136.8 in)
- Width: 1,605 mm (63.2 in)
- Height: 1,460 mm (57.5 in)
- Curb weight: 700–780 kg (1,540–1,720 lb)

The first generation Ford Festiva was designed and engineered by Mazda in Japan at the request of parent company Ford. The Mazda-designed and built three-door hatchback was launched in Japan in February 1986 under the name "Ford Festiva", with the 1.1 and 1.3-litre engines.

The Festiva used a front-wheel drive layout with rack and pinion steering, independent front suspension with struts, coil springs and sway bar, and a torsion beam rear suspension. The Festiva was facelifted in 1989, receiving a redesigned grille insert and tail lamp lenses. In Japan at launch, the Festiva three-door was offered in L, L Special, S, Ghia, and Canvas Top specification levels. Ford retailed the Japanese market Festiva via the Autorama dealership network. At the 1986 Tokyo Motor Show, the sporty GT and GT-X models were shown, with a unique twin-cam 1.3-litre engine (BJ). These were fitted with a special body kit and a prominent bonnet bulge, and went on sale on 1 December 1986. By then, the Festiva Cargo L (commercial version) had also been added to the lineup, in either a two- or a five-seat version.

Beginning in 1989, Autorama also began selling left-hand drive, Korean-assembled five-door hatchbacks (and later the four-door sedan as well). The Hatchback was sold as the Ford Festiva 5, while the four-door sedan was called the Festiva β. Neither version sold particularly well in Japan. 973 cars were brought in during 1989, with the aim of selling 2,000 the following year. Production of the Japanese market Ford Festiva ended in December 1992, with sales from stock continuing for another month.

=== Markets ===
==== North America ====
In mid-1986, another Ford partner, Kia Motors in South Korea began production of the Festiva under license as the "Kia Pride". Starting from late 1987 for the 1988 model year, Kia began exports to the United States under the "Ford Festiva" name. Canadian sales began in January 1989, marketed at Ford and Mercury dealerships. Ford offered a single 1.3-litre B3 four-cylinder engine and three trim levels: L, L Plus, and LX. The two base models featured a four-speed manual overdrive transmission, with the LX upgraded to a five-speed unit. A tachometer and tilt steering wheel also featured on the LX trim, as did alloy wheels, remote mirrors, cloth interior seating, and an AM/FM cassette radio.

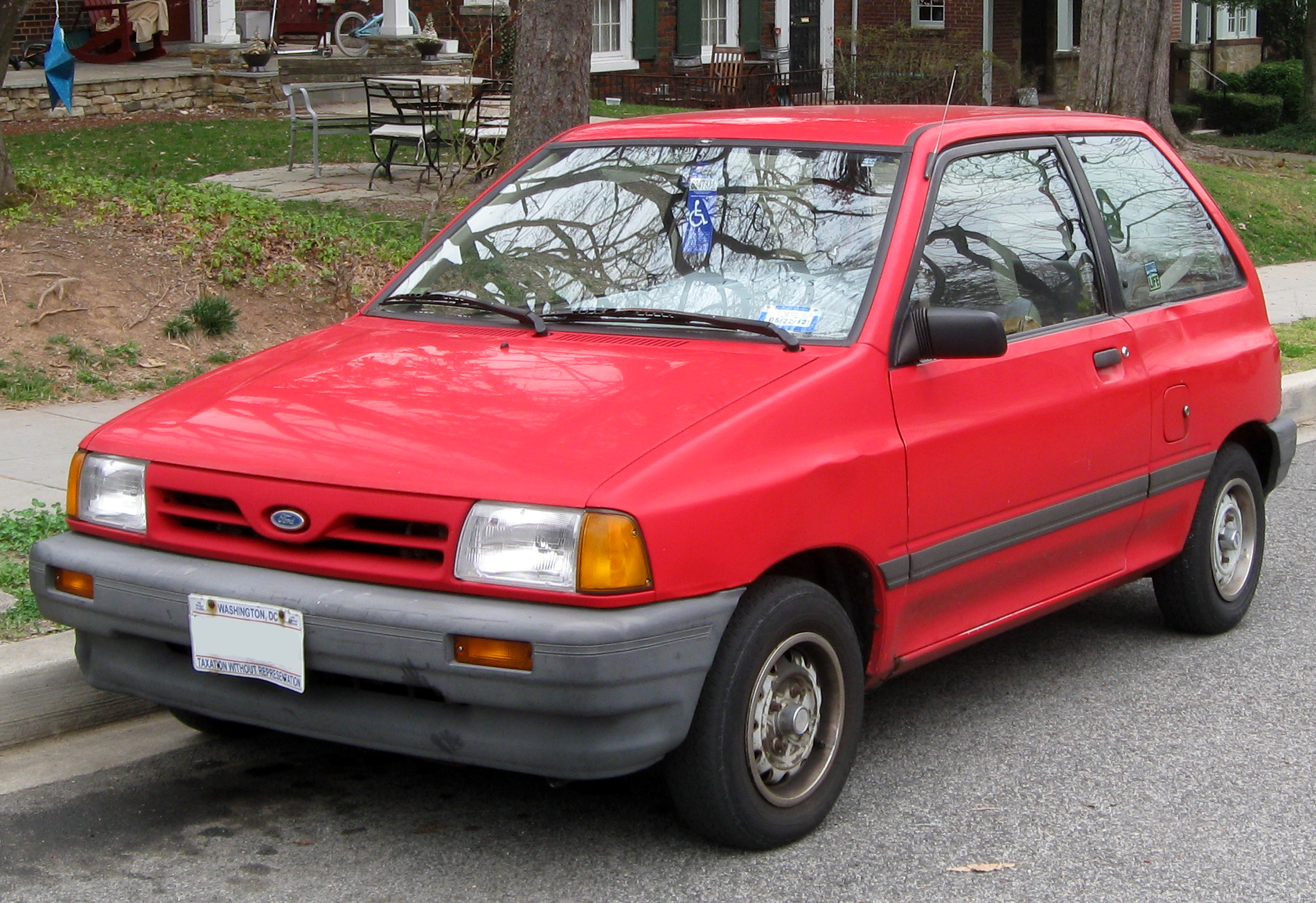
Facelift Ford Festiva L Plus 3-door (US; MY 1990)

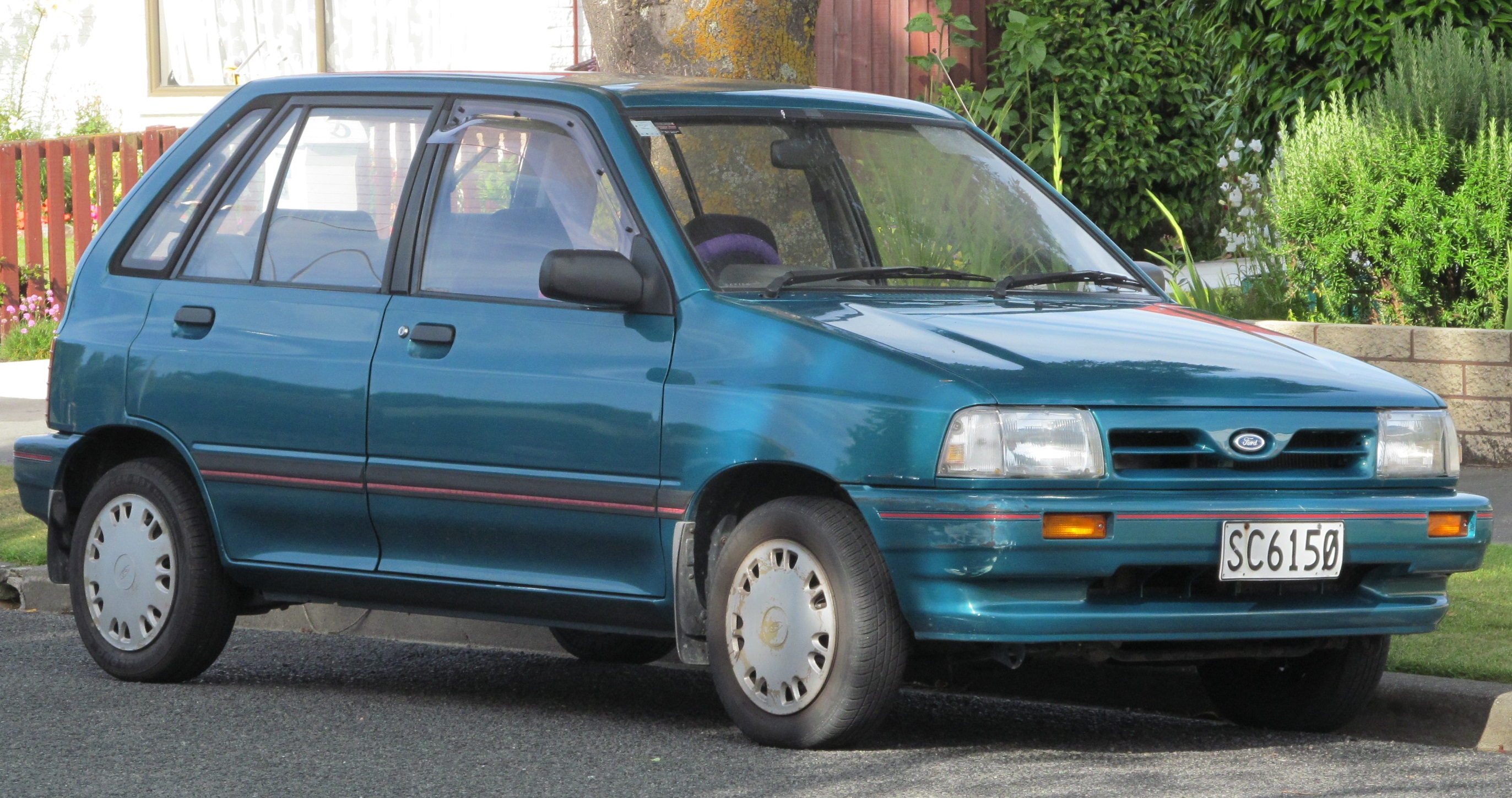
Facelift Ford Festiva GL (New Zealand; 1991–1993)

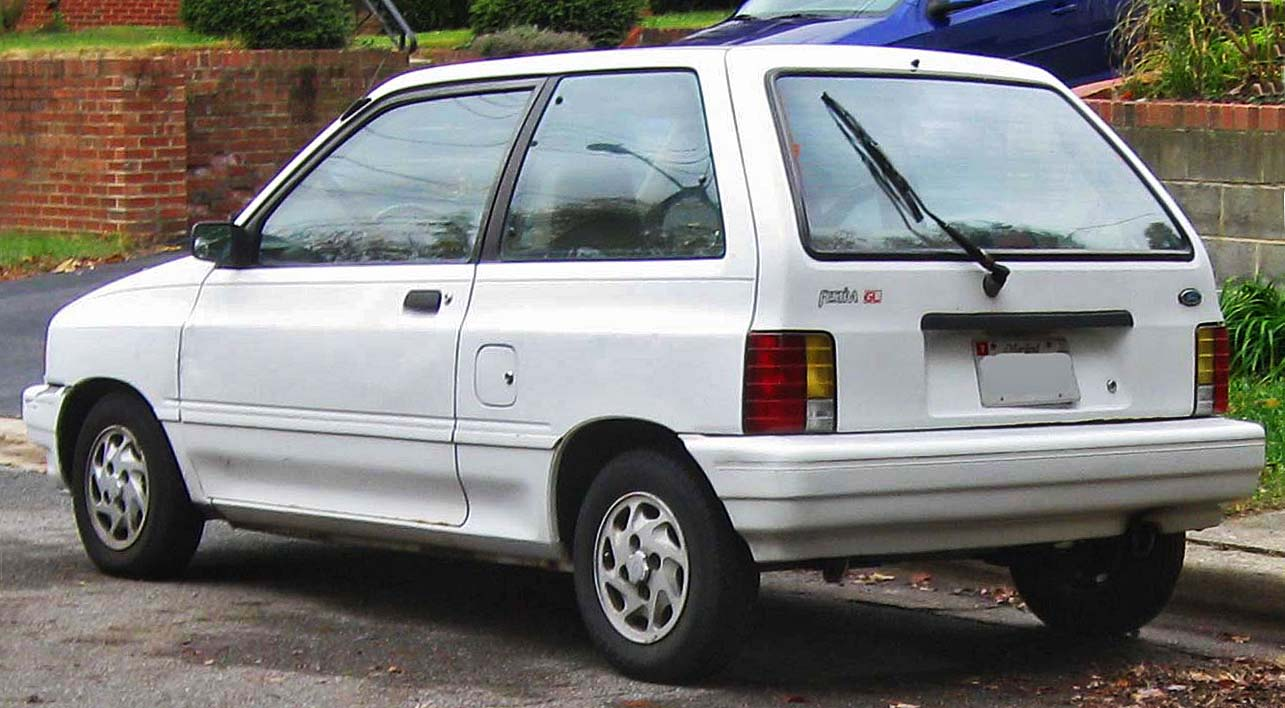
Facelift Ford Festiva GL 3-door (US; MY 1992–1993)

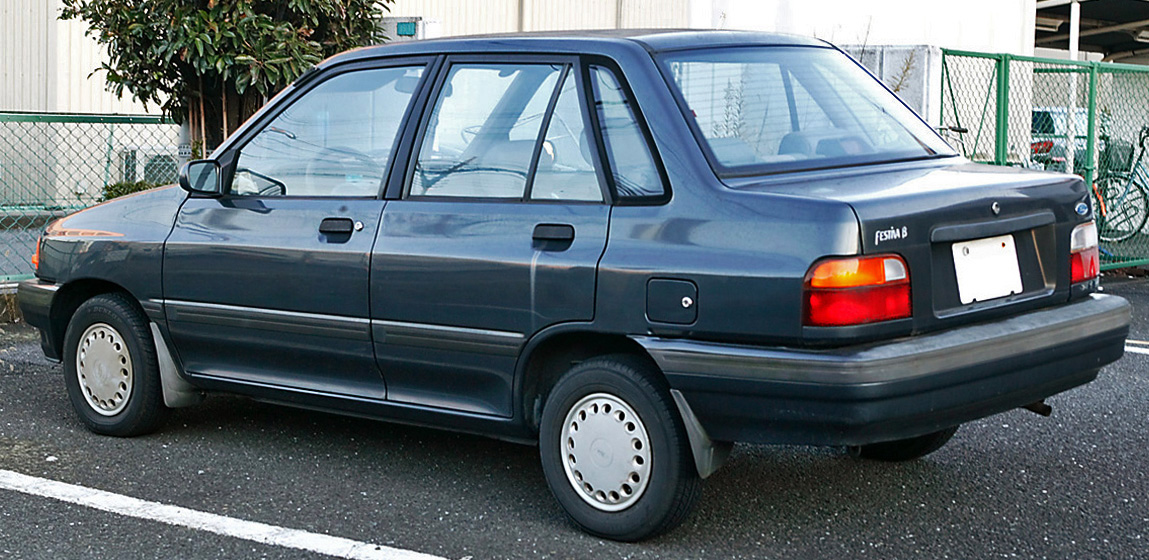
Facelift Ford Festiva β sedan (Japan)

Ford released a minor facelift in North America for the 1990 model year, shifting from carburetor to fuel injection with five-speed manual or optional three-speed automatic transmissions. Ford also replaced the manual front seat belts with motorized versions (Canadian market models kept the manual front seat belts), and fitted manual rear seat belts as standard. For the 1991 model year, the L Plus and LX models were combined into a single GL trim. Optional power steering was deleted for 1992, and the GL gained alloy wheels and an available sport package. The final 1993 model year brought no changes.

Over its life, Ford marketed roughly 350,000 Kia-manufactured Festiva models in the United States. The agreement with Ford materialized in accordance with Kia's strategy implemented in the mid-1980s to progressively fill the void at the low-cost end of the market slowly being abdicated by the Japanese brands pursuing more expensive models with higher profit margins. Compared to rival automakers in Japan, and also Europe and North America, Kia's main competitive advantage was its lower-paid South Korean workforce—which translated into lower-priced cars.

The 2008 edition of Monash University's Used Car Safety Ratings (UCSR), found that the first generation Festiva provides a "worse than average" (two out of five stars) level of safety in the event of an accident, in a comparison to other "light cars". The safety rating was not calculated solely on the basis of the protection of the vehicle's occupants, with protection for "cyclists, pedestrians and drivers of other vehicles" included to give a "better guide to the total community impact of vehicle safety."

==== Australia ====
Mazda began producing the Festiva as the "Mazda 121" for Australia (and Europe) in 1987, but this model was never retailed in Japan. The 121 ended production in 1990, and was officially discontinued by Mazda Australia in February 1991. From October 1991, Ford Australia began importing the car as the "Ford Festiva" from Kia's South Korean production facility. Where the Mazda was sold as a three-door hatchback, the Ford was sold initially as a five-door only. From January 1993, a Festiva three-door, badged "Festiva Trio" was launched in Australia. Both versions were powered by the overhead camshaft carbureted 1.3-litre B3 engine with the five-speed manual transmission; a three-speed automatic was optional for the five-door. Standard equipment in Australia included an AM/FM radio, tachometer, intermittent windscreen wipers, remote releases for the rear door and fuel tank filler door, with air conditioning available as an option. Ford discontinued the WA Festiva in the Australian market in March 1994 in way for the WB Festiva.

Ford Australia's action was paralleled in Europe where Kia started exporting three- and five-door hatchback, four-door sedan, and five-door wagon variants of the Kia Pride in 1991 under their own name. These additional sedan and five-door hatchback body variants were also imported from South Korea to Japan in left-hand drive form (Japan officially being a right-hand drive market) as the "Ford Festiva 5" (from May 1991) and "Festiva β", respectively.

==== Taiwan ====
In Taiwan, it was assembled using complete knock-down kits from 1989 via the local joint venture Ford Lio Ho.

=== Ford Festiva Shogun ===
In 1990, racer/journalist Rick Titus and engineer Chuck Beck (creator of the Beck Roadster kit car) built the Festiva Shogun. Inspired by the Australian Giocattolo project, they started a company called Special Editions, Inc., to produce a limited run of 250 cars. These cars were powered by a mid-mounted Yamaha V6 sourced from the first generation Ford Taurus SHO, producing 220 hp (164 kW). The Festiva Shogun was displayed in the Ford tent at the 1990 Monterey Historics and Ford was considering providing SHO engines directly; the deal fell through after executives test drove the car and deemed it a little too raucous for the company to put their imprimatur on. With the car not being an official Ford product, Special Editions had to buy SHOs from dealers and remove the engines, increasing the price by over ten percent. The price increase, the cancellation of a Japanese order, and the economy slowing down because of the first Gulf War, conspired against the project taking off and only seven cars (plus the prototype) were built.

=== Mazda 121 (DA) ===
Mazda began selling the 121 as a single three-door hatchback body variant in 1987 to sit below the larger 323 model. Despite being manufactured there, the 121 was not sold in Japan under the "Mazda" brand. Australian specification 121s were fitted with the 1.3-litre B3 engine, mated to a five-speed manual transmission. European markets also received the 55 PS (40 kW) 1.1-litre B1 engine with a four-speed manual transmission.

The 121 was sold in Australia from March 1987. It featured a sliding rear bench seat, which increased cargo space by as much as 180 millimeters (7.1 in). Levels of trim in Australia comprised the base-line "deluxe", the "super deluxe", and the "fun top" (based on the super deluxe), featuring a large electric sliding canvas sunroof. From October 1988, the super deluxe was discontinued and replaced by the "shades" trim. The European premiere for the 121 was at the Geneva Auto Salon in March 1988. The 1.1-litre version was added in July 1989. Trim levels were L and LX, with an SR version also available in the UK. In Europe, the car's ventilation system, developed with American consumers in mind, was notable for its refinement for the class. An interesting design feature was that the rear seat back could be reclined somewhat, and the seat could be moved longitudinally, adding up to 50 litres (11 imp gal) of space to the otherwise very small luggage compartment.

Mazda issued an update for the 121 (released in October 1989 for the Australian market) with a new grille insert, body-hued exterior trim, redesigned instrumentation and interior seats and trim. The Mazda variant was discontinued in 1991, being replaced by a new generation Mazda 121, based on the Japanese market Autozam Revue.

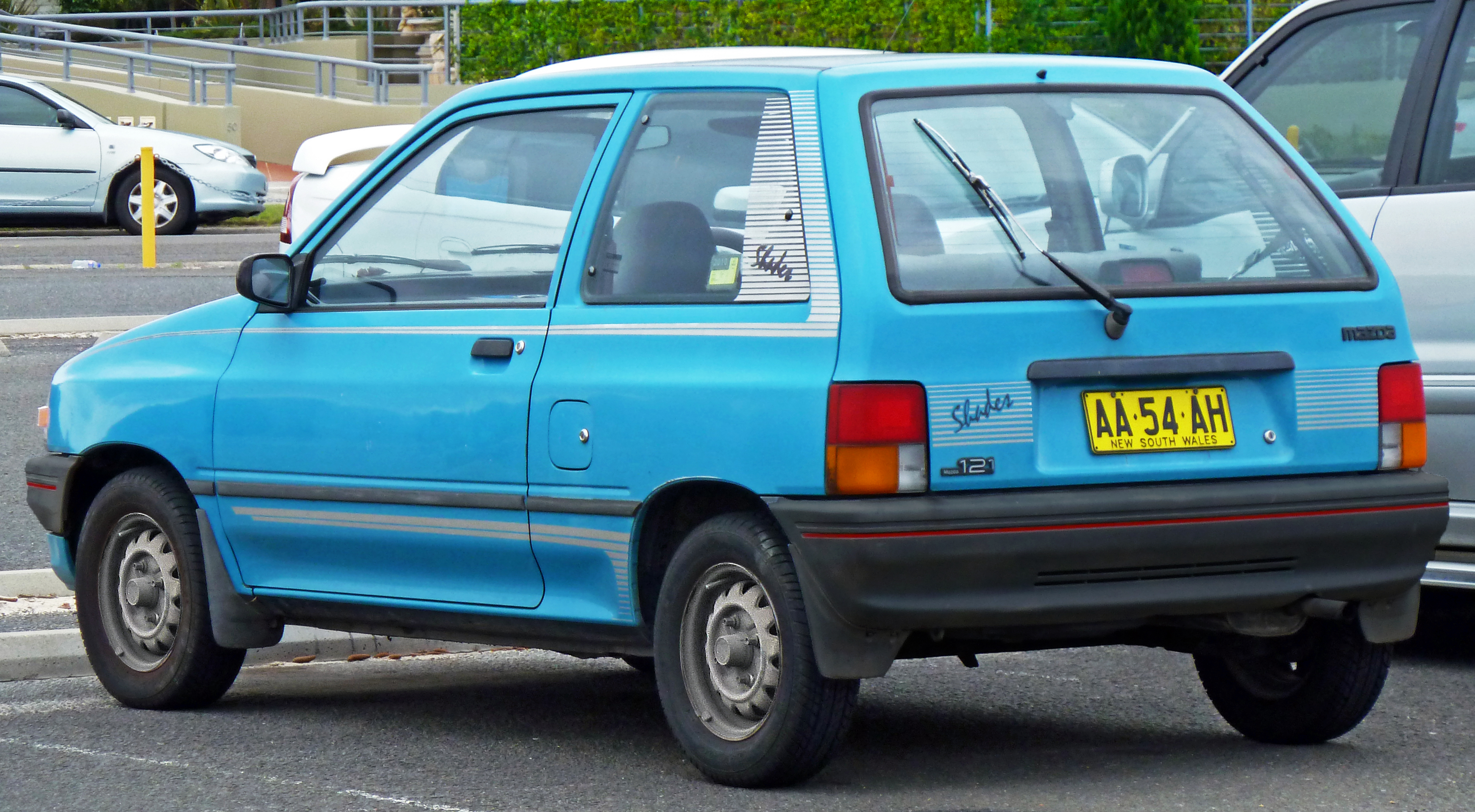
Pre-facelift Mazda 121 Shades (Australia)

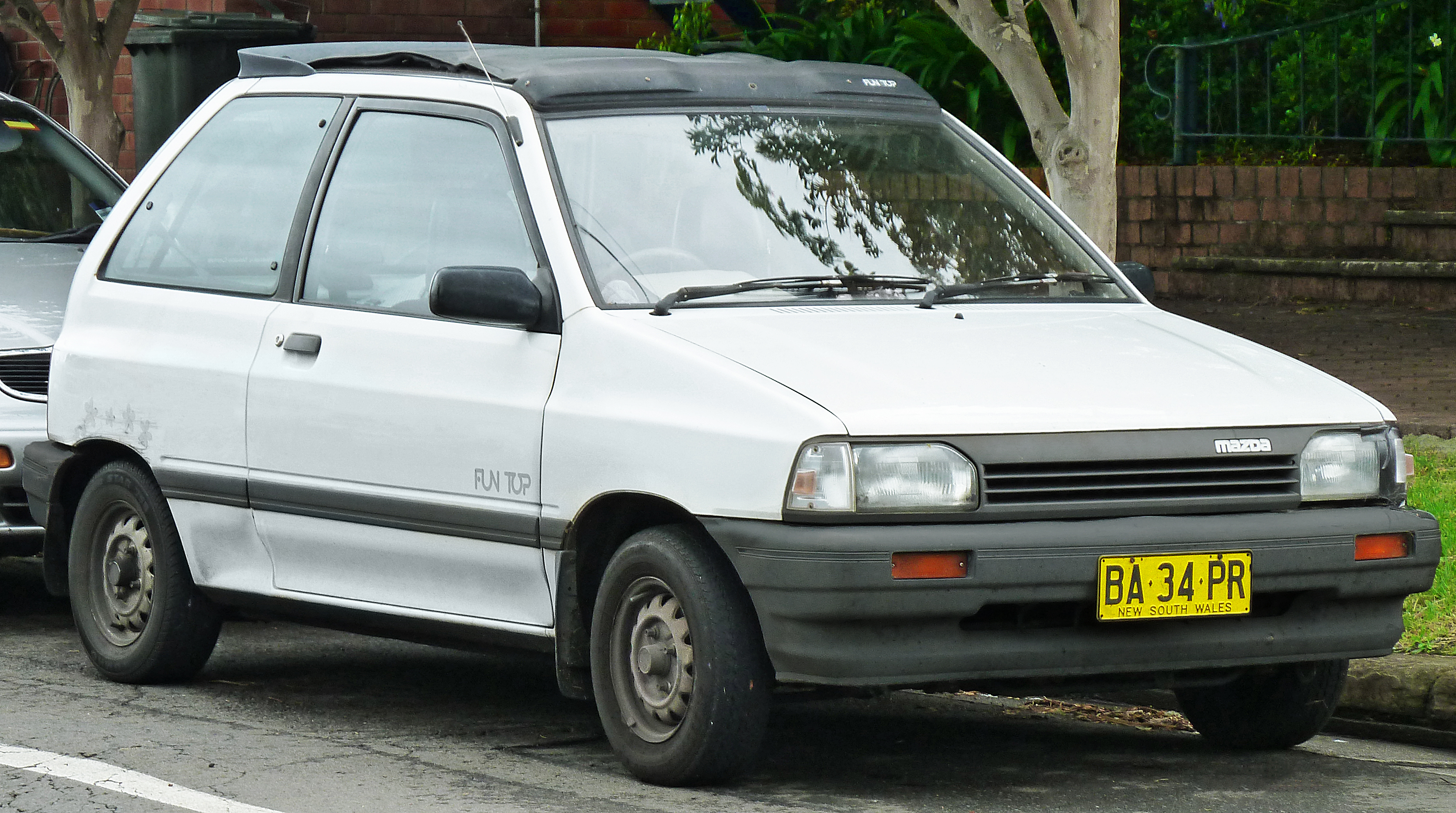
Pre-facelift Mazda 121 Fun Top, with canvas roof (Australia)

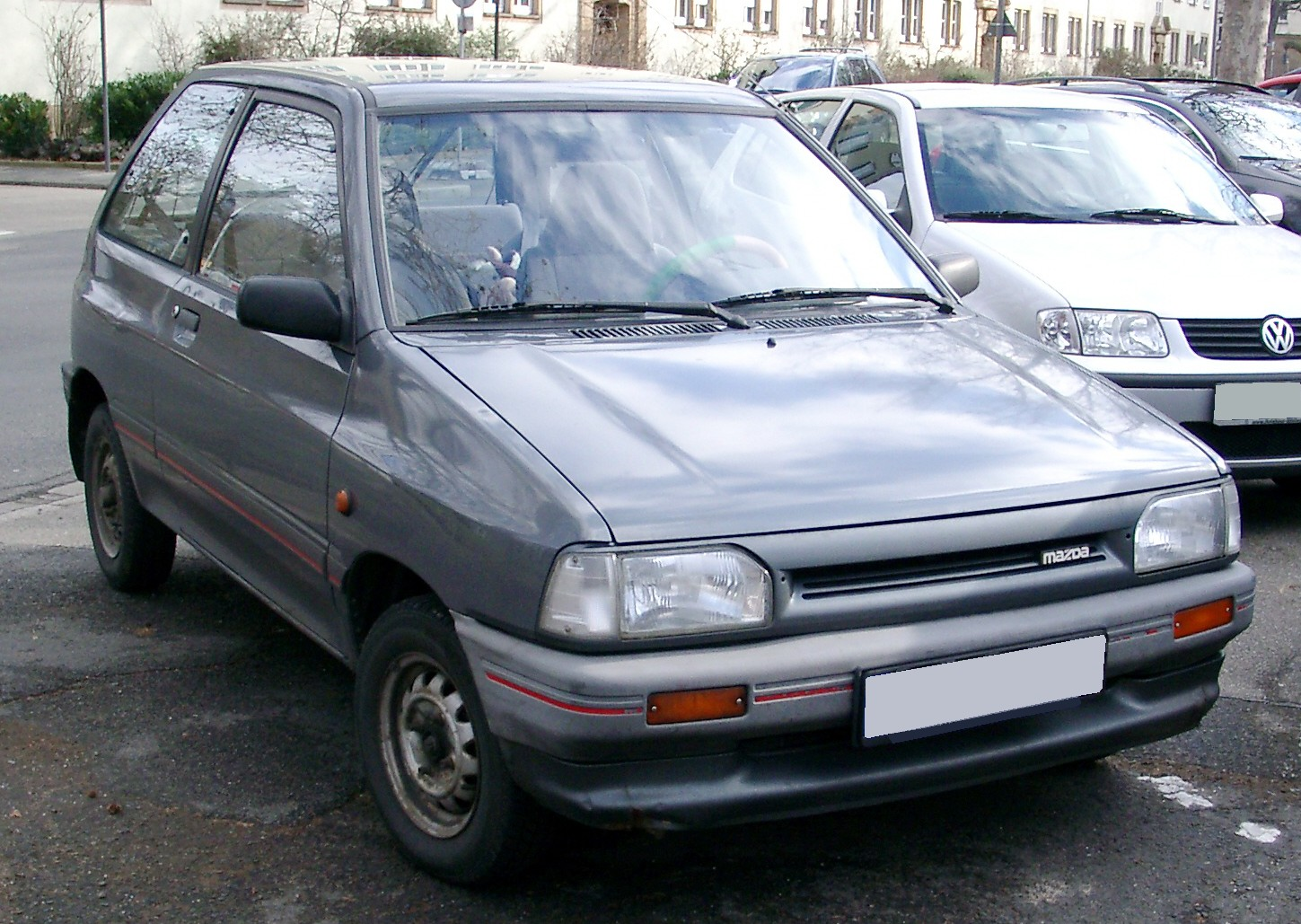
Facelift Mazda 121 (Germany)

=== Kia Pride (Y) ===
The Kia Pride badged version of the Festiva was manufactured in South Korea by Kia Motors from March 1987 to January 2000. Prior to its South Korean market release, exports as the Festiva had begun in December 1986 to Japan and the United States. The Pride was sold in four-door sedan form (in LX, GTX, and β trim levels), as well as three- and five-door hatchback forms (the CD-5) and five-door wagon body styles. The original Pride was only available as a three-door hatchback, while the five-door was added in June 1988. The four-door sedan model, the Pride Beta, arrived in November 1990, and the range was completed by the three-door van and five-door wagon in February 1992. In November 1993 the Pride received a minor facelift and production was also moved to Kia's Asia Motors subsidiary's Gwangju plant as Kia focused on the new Avella (Ford Aspire/WB Festiva). Until the Mazda 121 was replaced in late 1990, Kia-badged cars were only exported to certain tertiary markets. The Pride was replaced by the Rio beginning in 1999.

In October 2024, to celebrate Kia's 80th Anniversary, a first-generation Pride was restomodded into an electric vehicle, featuring a manual gearbox and a fresh coat of White Pearl paint (as also offered on Kia's contemporary EVs). This was a one-off vehicle, not meant for sale to the public.

The Pride launched in the United Kingdom in June 1991, fitted with either the 1.1- B1 or 1.3-litre B3 engines. The 1.1 was only available as a three-door in the basic L trim (whitewall tyres were a commonplace feature on them). There was also a panel van two-seater version in the UK and some other markets. Fuel injection appeared on the 1.3-litre-engined models in November 1994, referred to as the "1.3i". At this time, the 1.1-litre version was deleted. December 1995 saw the Start 1.3i three-door replace the L, and the Pride was then briefly discontinued in the UK in January 1999. In June 1999, it was relaunched in an entry-level three-door now called S with the higher-level three- and five-doors known as the SX. Sales of the relaunched model ended in June 2000.

The Pride was also sold in Pakistan, where it was assembled from 1996 to 2005 in a joint venture with Dewan Motors in two variations: first as the five-door version with the 1.1-litre engine and then in a four-door sedan variation from 1999 to 2005, named Kia Classic.

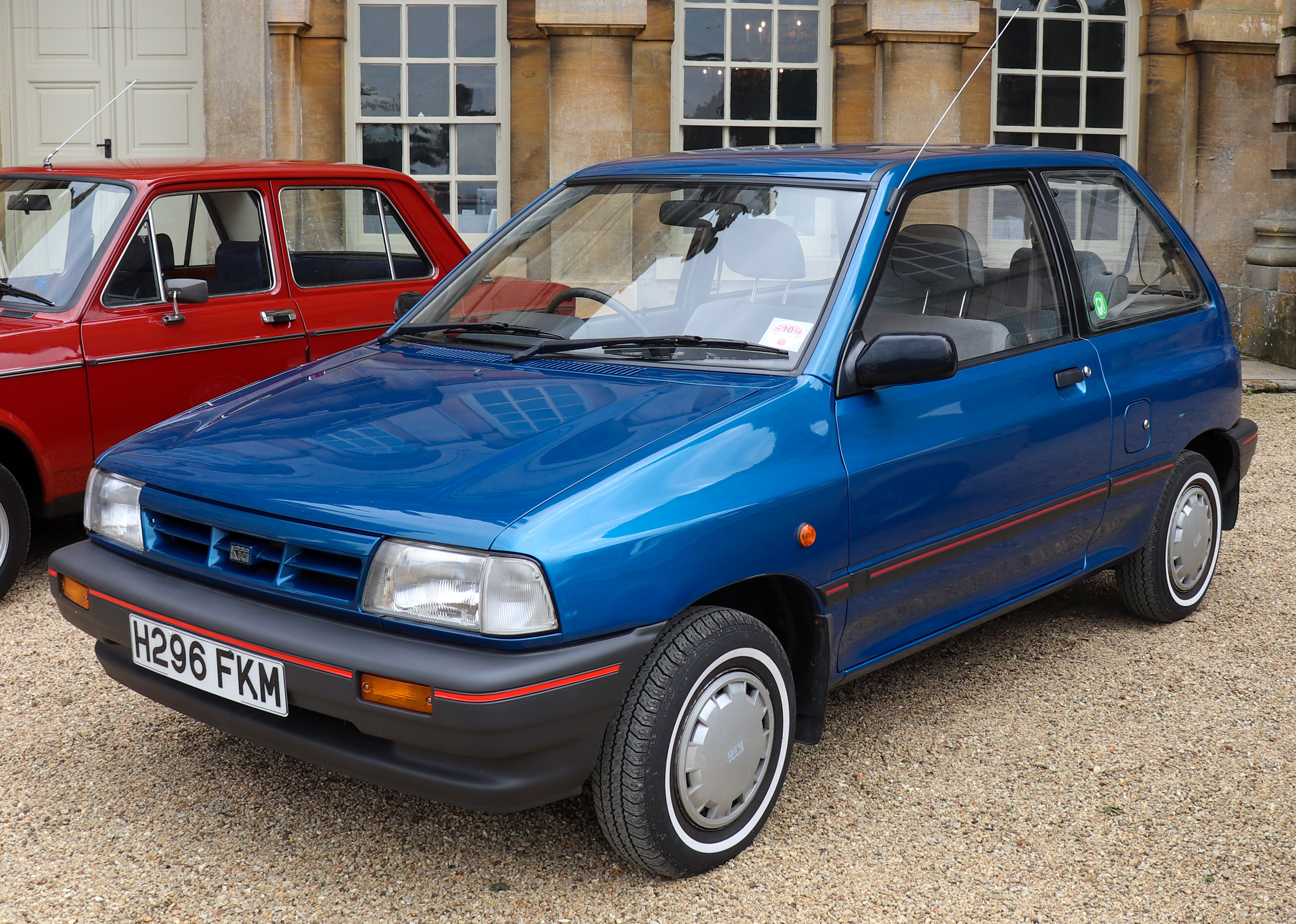
Pre-facelift Kia Pride 3-door (UK)

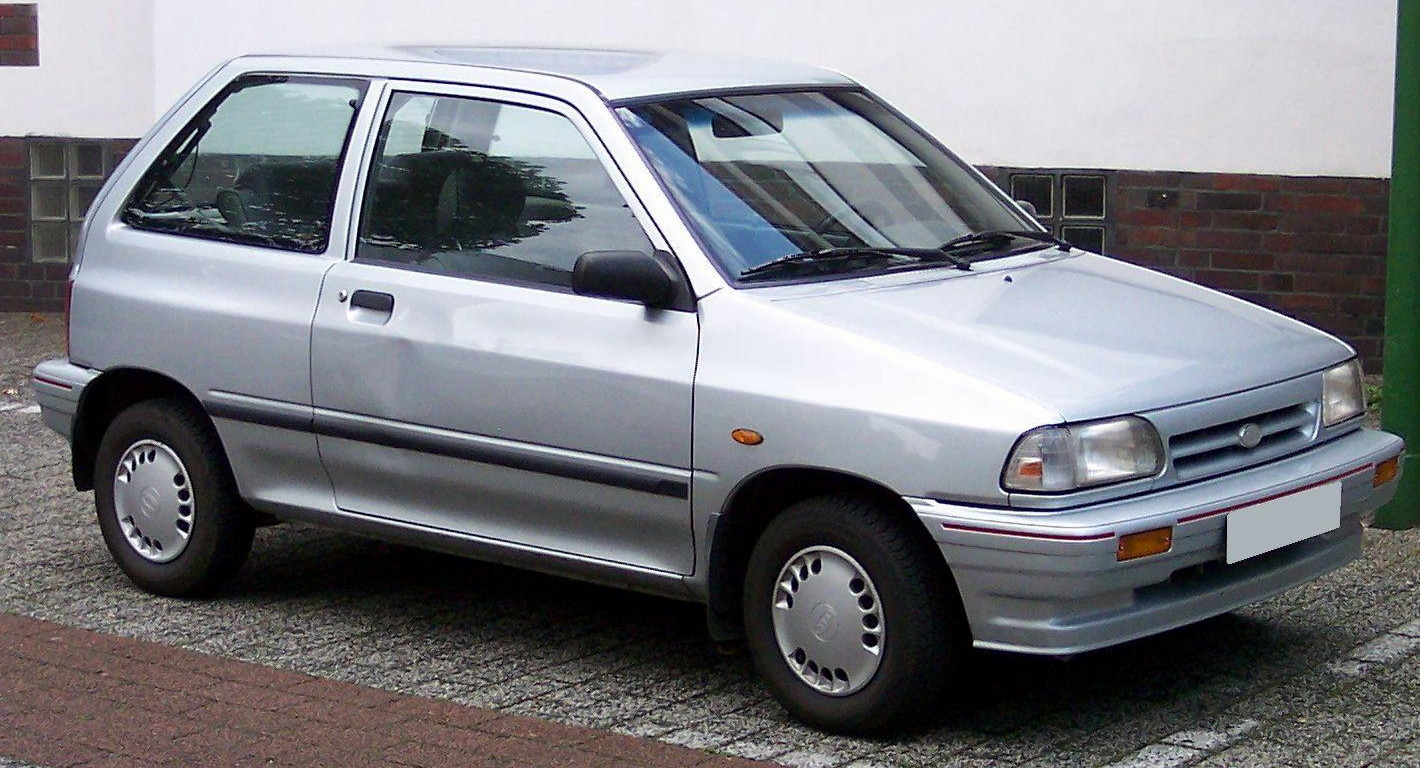
Facelift Kia Pride 3-door (Germany)

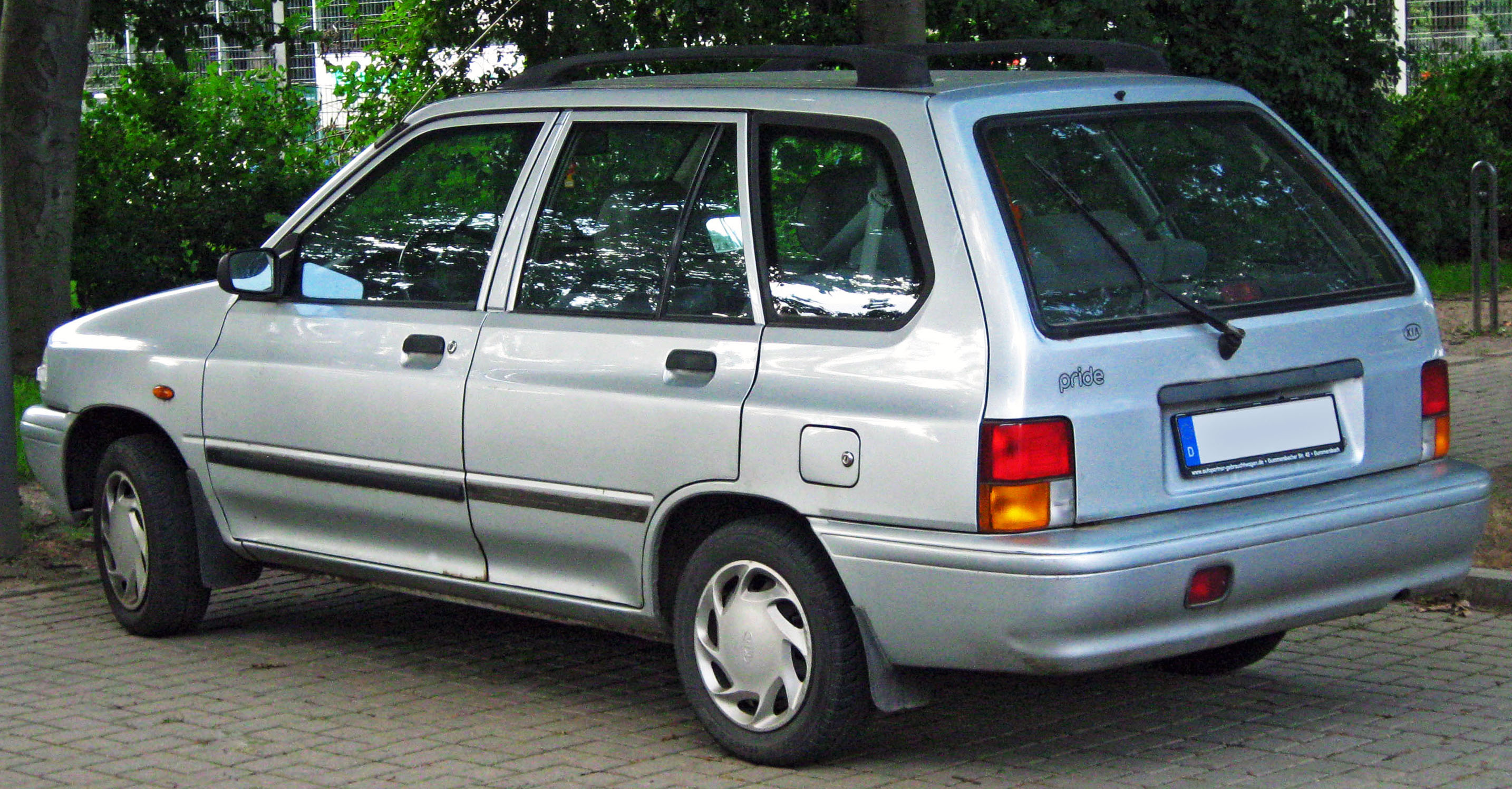
Facelift Kia Pride wagon (Germany)

=== SAIPA Pride ===
SAIPA has built the Kia Pride in Iran under license since 1993 and using up to 85 percent local parts as the SAIPA Pride from 2001 to 2005. Since 2003, SAIPA has produced a new five-door liftback model based on the Pride called the SAIPA 141, while continuing to sell the Iranian version of the Pride under the names SAIPA Saba GLXi (four-door sedan), SAIPA Nasim Safari (five-door wagon) and SAIPA Nasim DMi (five-door hatchback). Compared to these versions, the SAIPA 141 features revised rear styling with a longer liftback tail, and different interior design. Beginning in 2007, the SAIPA 141 was assembled and sold in Venezuela under the name Venirauto Turpial. The plan was to reach 92 percent local parts content, but this was generally regarded as unrealistic and Venirauto's total annual production generally hovered around 2,000 cars.

Another variant, known as the SAIPA 132 began production in 2008 and differs from the Saba with its revised front and rear styling. The company introduced a coupe utility body style in 2008 under the name SAIPA 151, with a 500-kilogram (1,100 lb) payload. The platform/engine of the Kia Pride also formed the basis for the Iranian P.K (2000 to 2005) and New P.K (2005 to 2007) models, which utilize Renault 5 bodies. In Iran, the Pride continues to be the most common car with approximately 40 percent of vehicles in the country being a Pride-derived SAIPA.

Arab American Vehicles (AAV) manufactured the Pride in Cairo, Egypt, circa 1998.

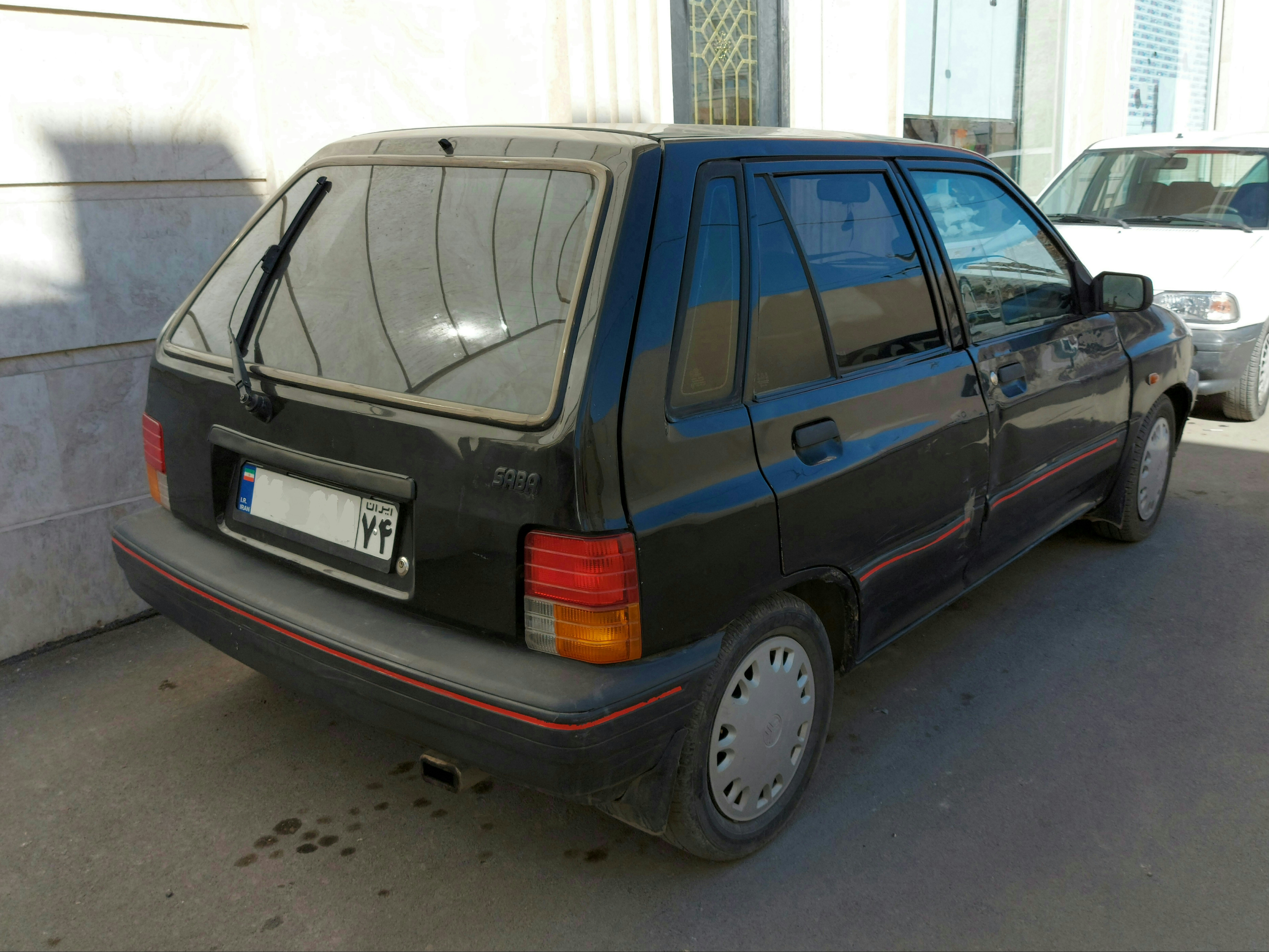
Saipa Nasim (Iran)

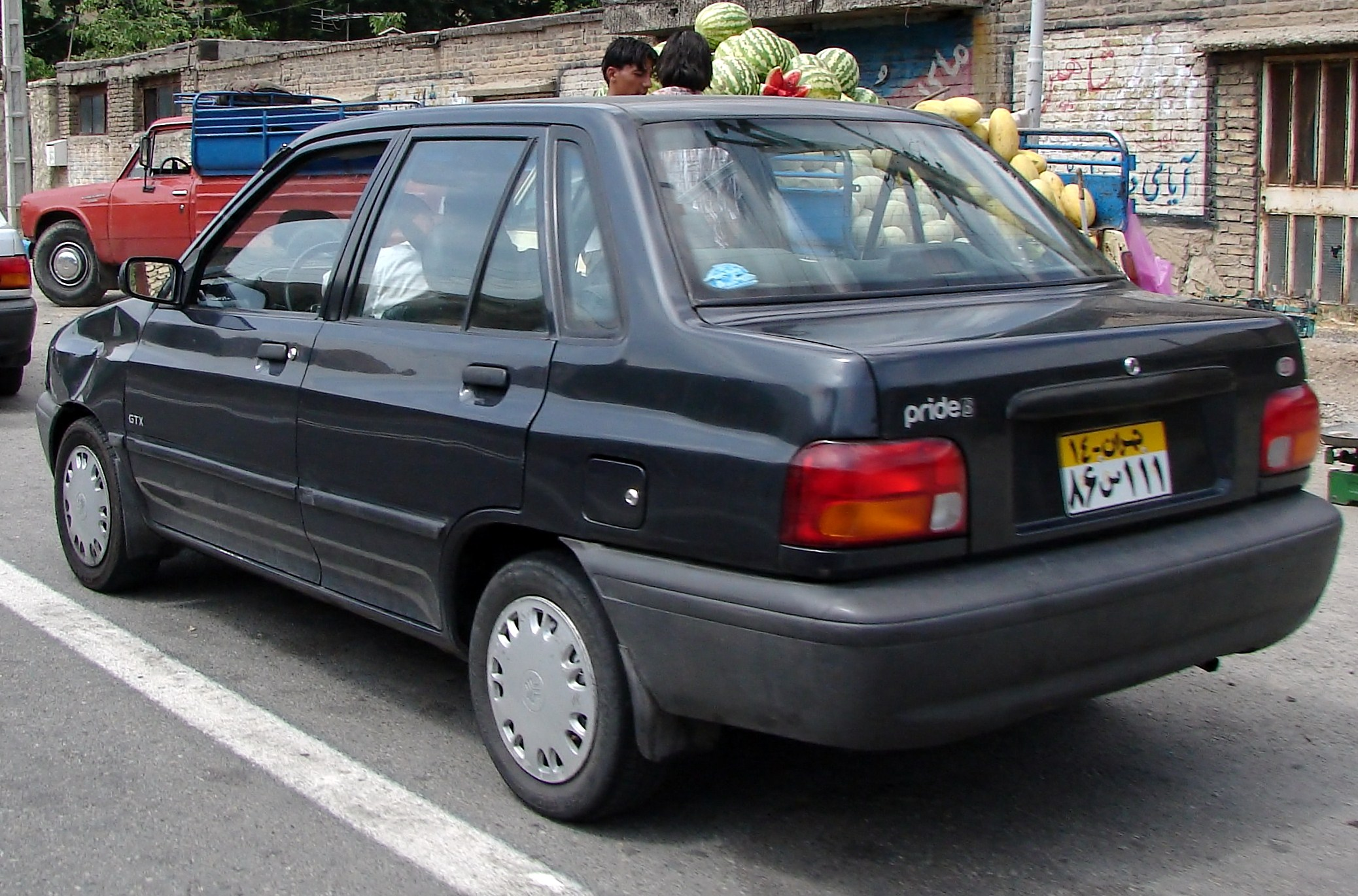
Saipa Saba (Iran)

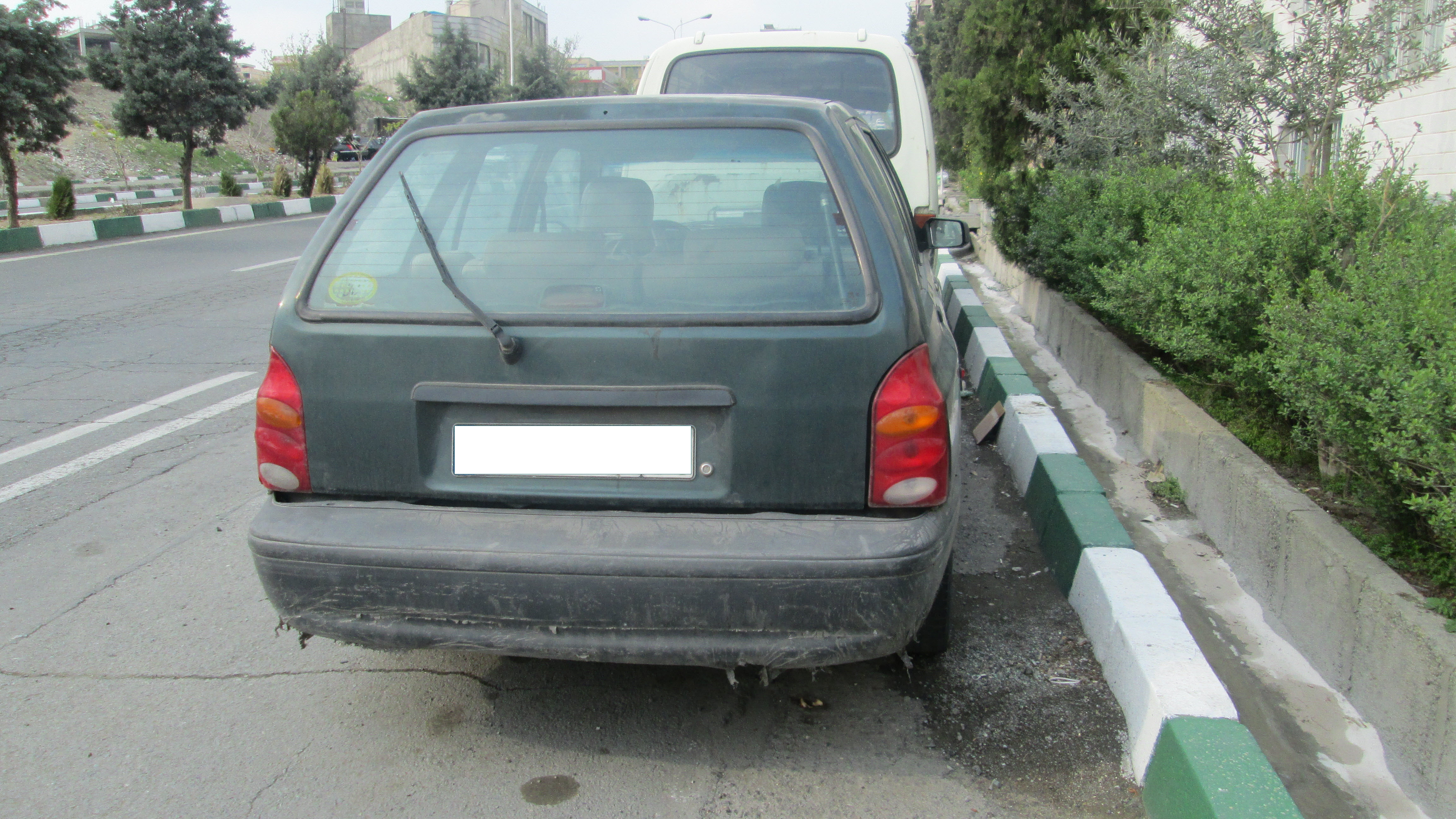
Saipa Safari (Iran)

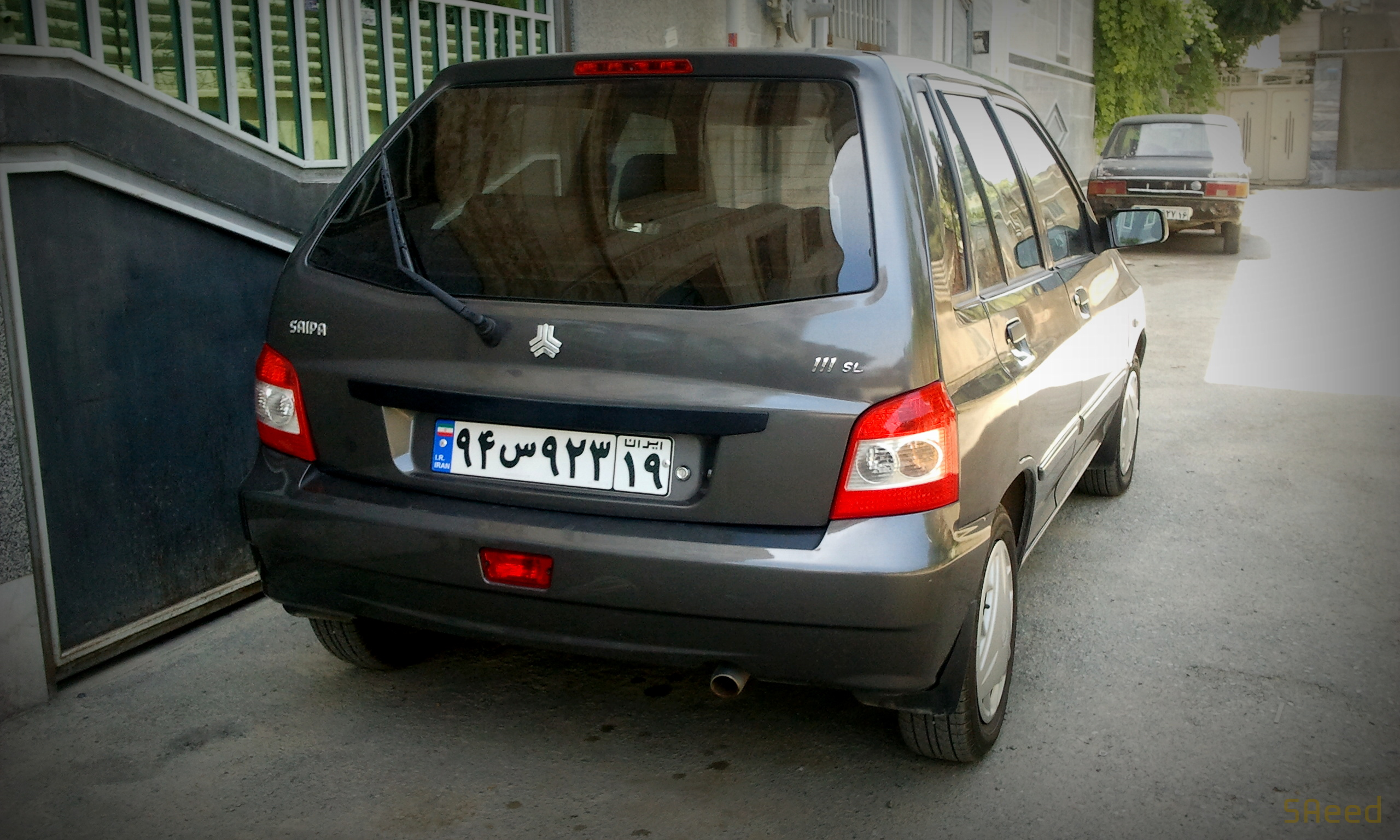
Saipa 111 (Iran)

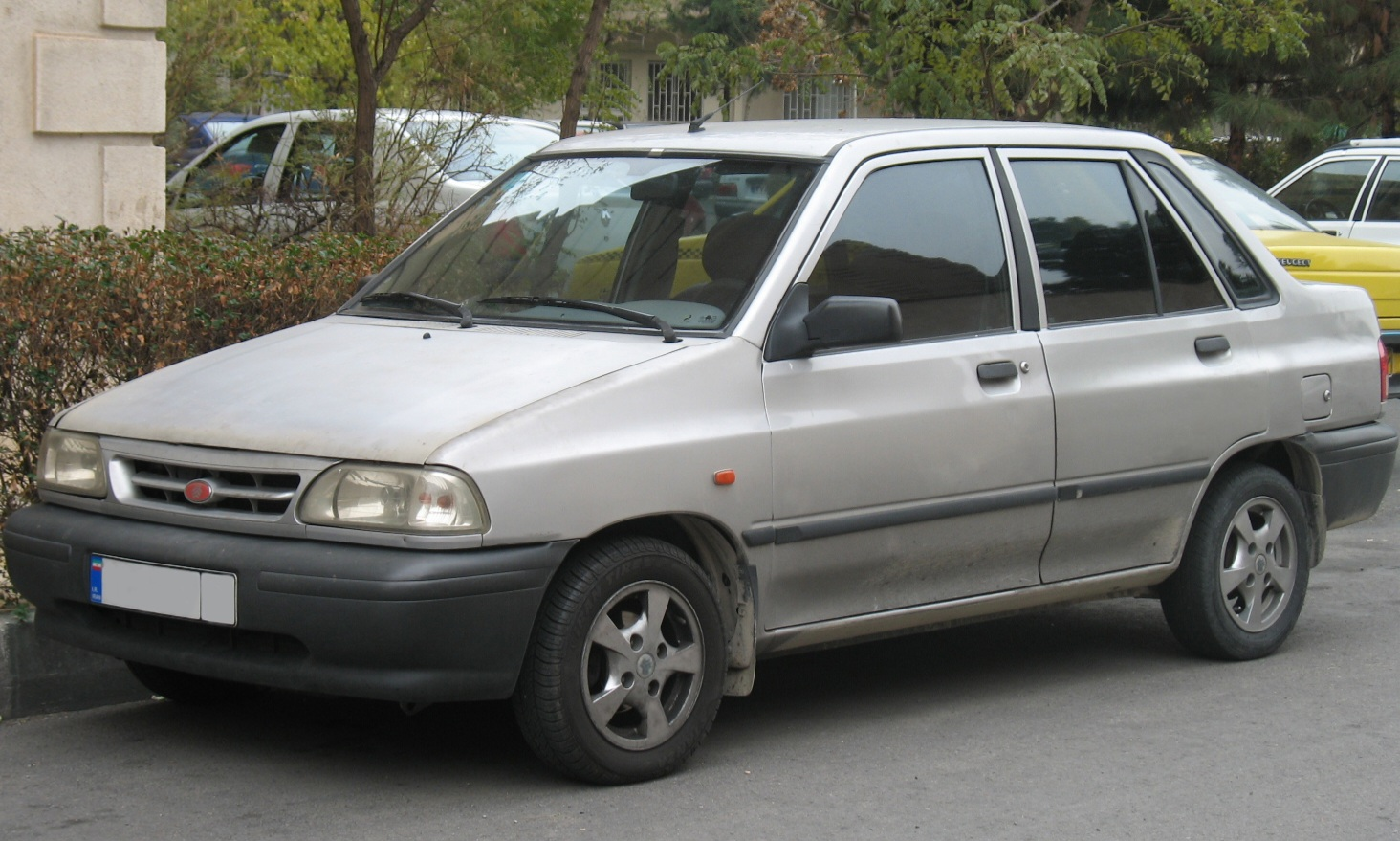
Saipa 131 (Iran)

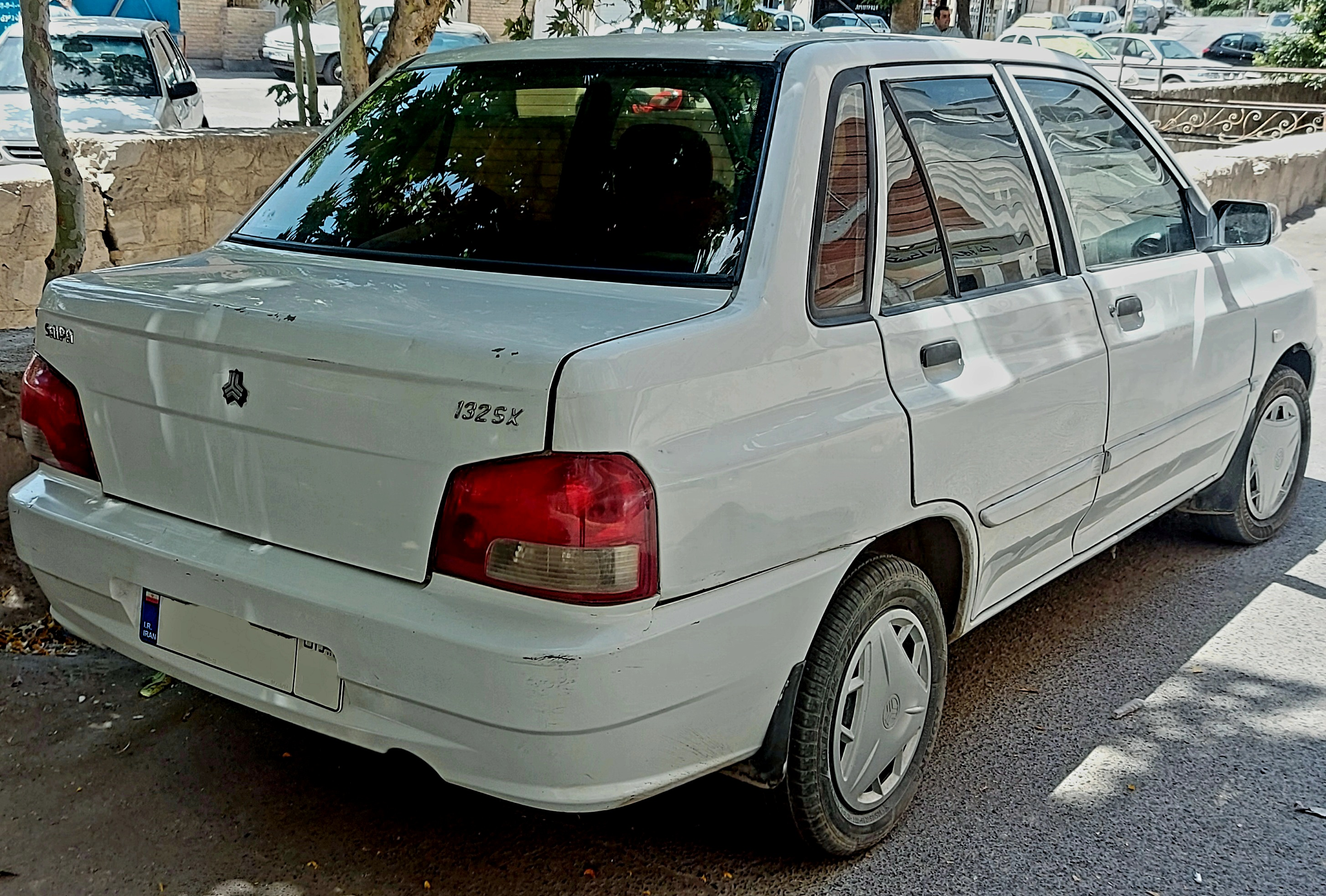
Saipa 132 (Iran)

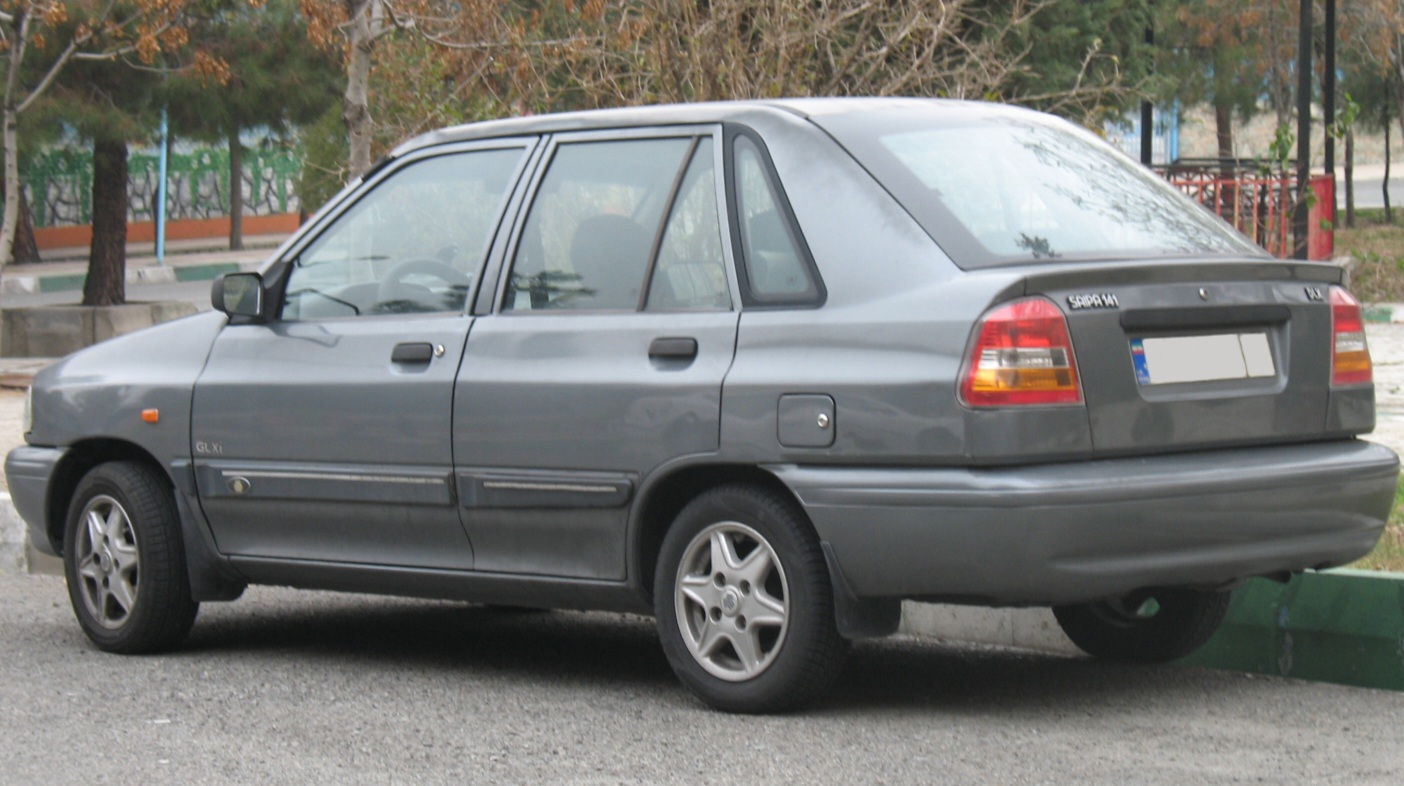
Saipa 141 (Iran)

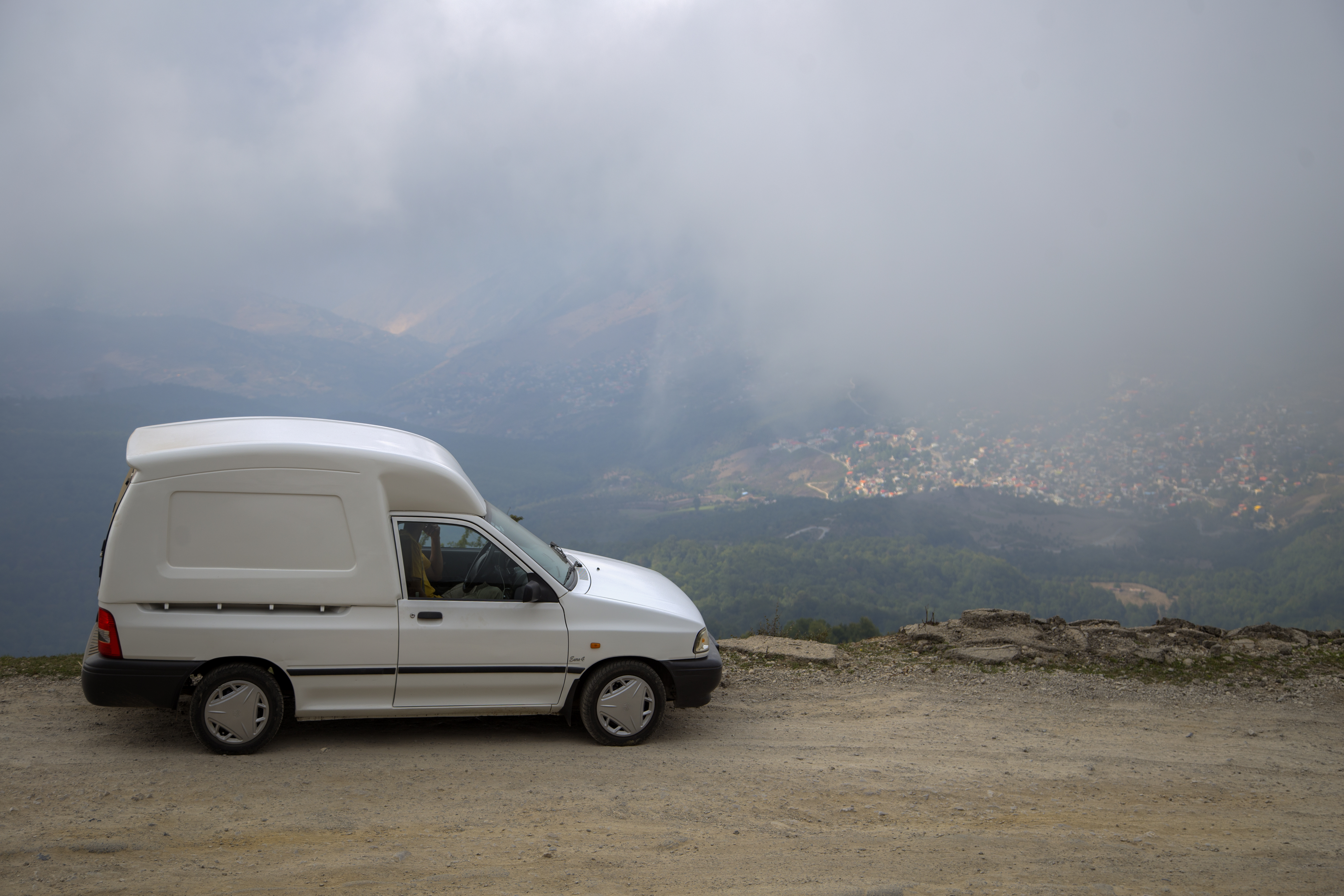
Saipa 151 (Iran)

=== Kia Pride in China ===
The Kia Pride firstly involved in a joint venture in Zhuhai, Guangdong Province with automobile company Guangtong Motors, where they were producing cars under a licence. The batch of cars would firstly be imported into China where parts are brought in later and the company would assemble the finished product. Jiangsu Yueda Auto Works (later Yueda Kia Motors, currently Jiangsu Yueda Kia Motors) began assembly of the Pride in 1997. The sedan was called the Yueda Kia Pride YQZ6390, the hatchback either YQZ6370 or YQZ7141. Chinese production ended in December 2003.

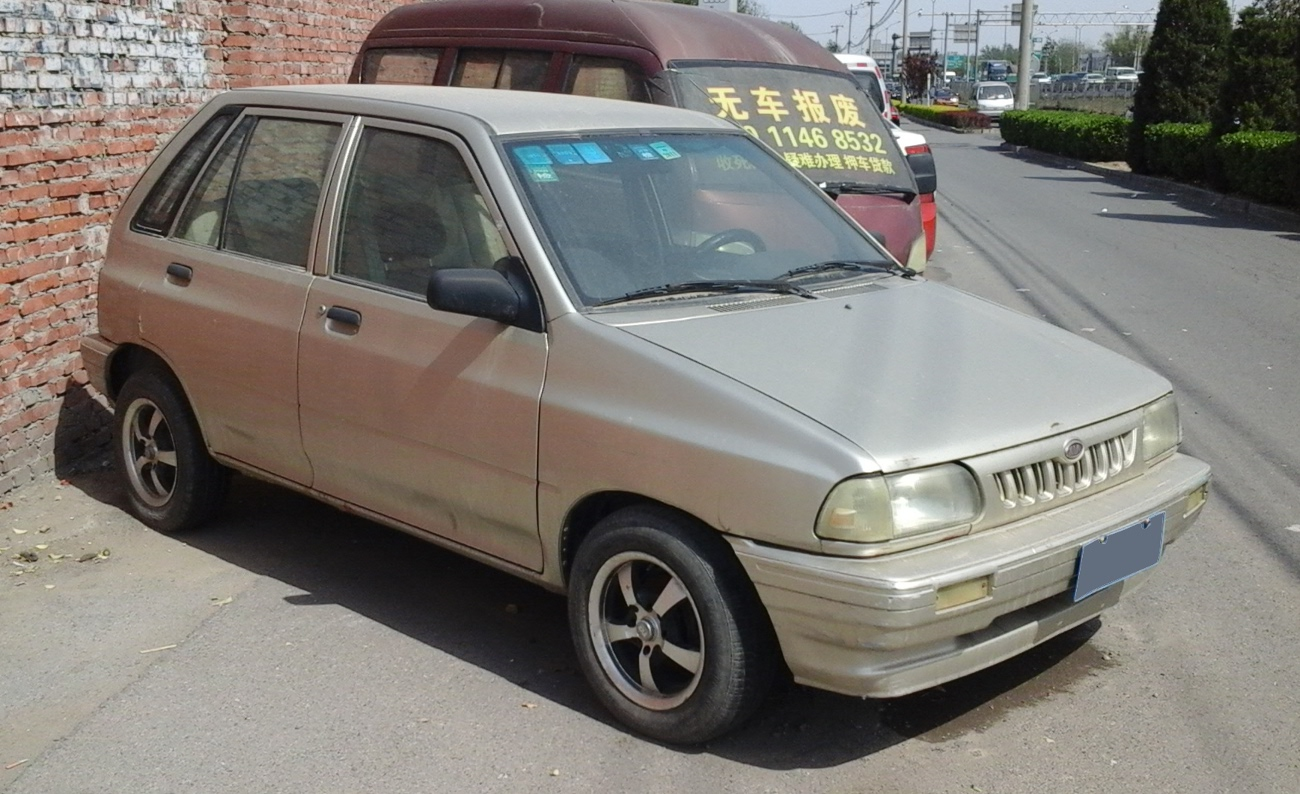
Kia Pride Y hatch (China)

== Second generation (WB, WD, WF; 1993) ==
Second generation
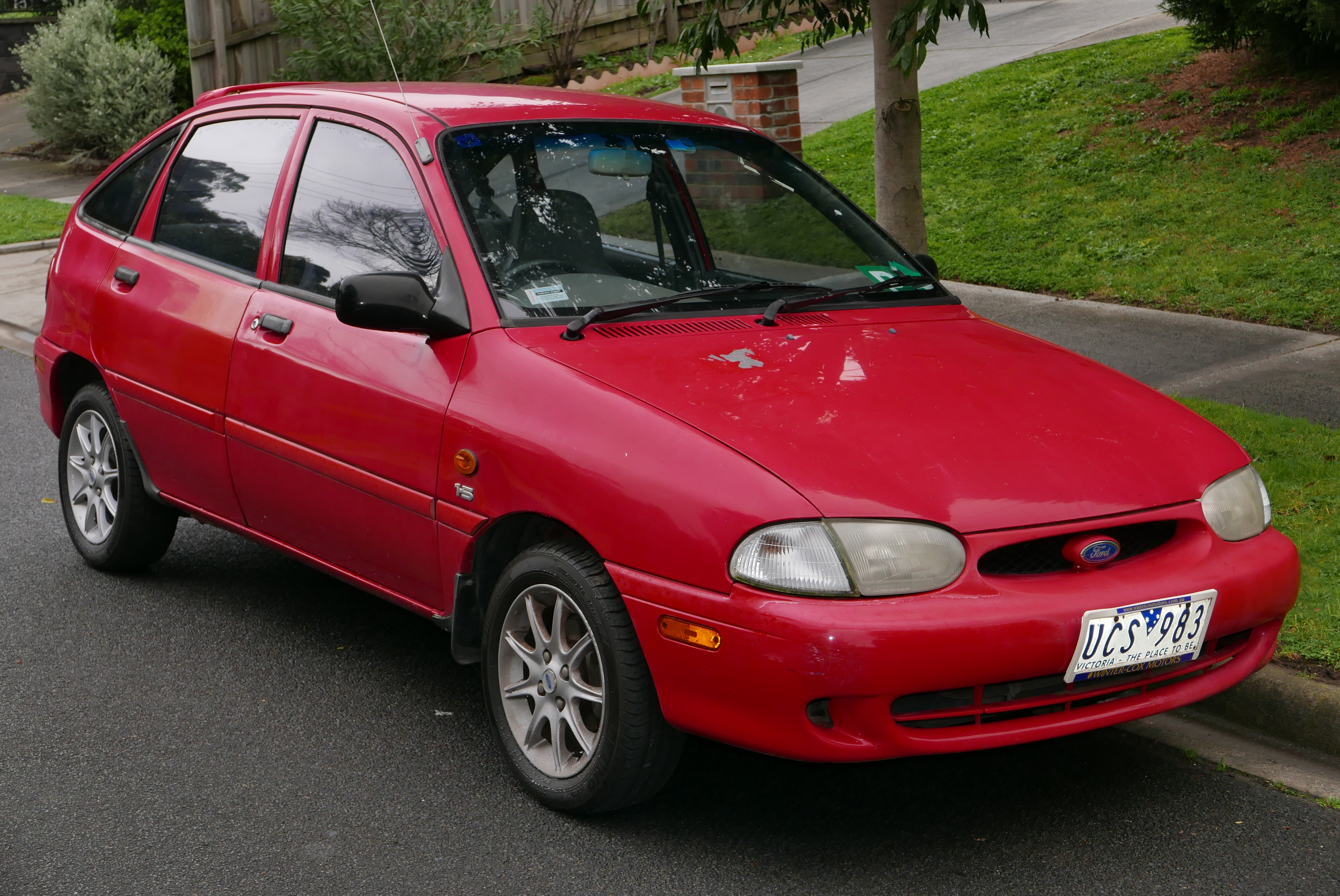

Overview
- Manufacturer: Kia
- Also called: Ford Aspire; Kia Avella; Sauber Teenager (Austria)
- Production: 1993–2000
- Model years: 1994–1997 (North America)
- Assembly: South Korea: Gwangmyeong (Sohari Plant)

Body and chassis
- Body style: 3/5-door hatchback 4-door sedan

Powertrain
- Engine: 1.3 L Mazda B3 I4; 1.5 L Mazda B5 I4
- Transmission: 3-speed Mazda F3A automatic 4-speed automatic 5-speed manual

Dimensions
- Wheelbase: 2,305 mm (90.7 in) (3-door hatchback); 2,385 mm (93.9 in) (sedan/5-door hatchback)
- Length: 3,825 mm (150.6 in)
- Width: 1,670 mm (65.7 in)
- Height: 1,440–1,470 mm (56.7–57.9 in)
- Curb weight: 820–940 kg (1,810–2,070 lb)

Chronology
- Successor: Kia Rio (Avella); Ford Ka; Ford Fiesta

The second model Ford Festiva, launched in 1993, was jointly developed between Kia and Ford, retaining most of the drivetrain of the previous model with a more rounded body style. This new Festiva was slightly longer, wider, more aerodynamic, and suspended by MacPherson struts in the front and a torsion beam axle in the rear. While it was sold in certain markets as a second generation Festiva, Ford renamed it the "Aspire" in North American markets, where the five-door model was offered for the first time. In South Korea, the car was badged "Kia Avella". The sedan version was mainly restricted to the South Korean market, although it was also available with Ford Festiva badging in Taiwan.

Depending on the market, some retained the SOHC, throttle-body injected motor, while others received an engine with a DOHC cylinder head and MPI also designed by Mazda. These engines were:

- B3 EGi: 1.3 L (1,323 cc) fuel injected 8-valve inline-four making 73 PS (54 kW; 72 hp) at 5000 rpm and 100 N⋅m (74 lb⋅ft) at 3000 rpm

- 76 PS (56 kW; 75 hp) in Japan

- B5 EGi: 1.5 L (1,498 cc) fuel injected 16-valve inline-four making 88 PS (65 kW; 87 hp) at 5000 rpm and 134 N⋅m (99 lb⋅ft) at 4000 rpm (Asia and Oceania only)

- 100 PS (74 kW; 99 hp) in Japan

Transmission options comprised a 5-speed manual transmission, although some models could be optioned with a 4-speed automatic. Australian and U.S. models were equipped with a 3-speed automatic.

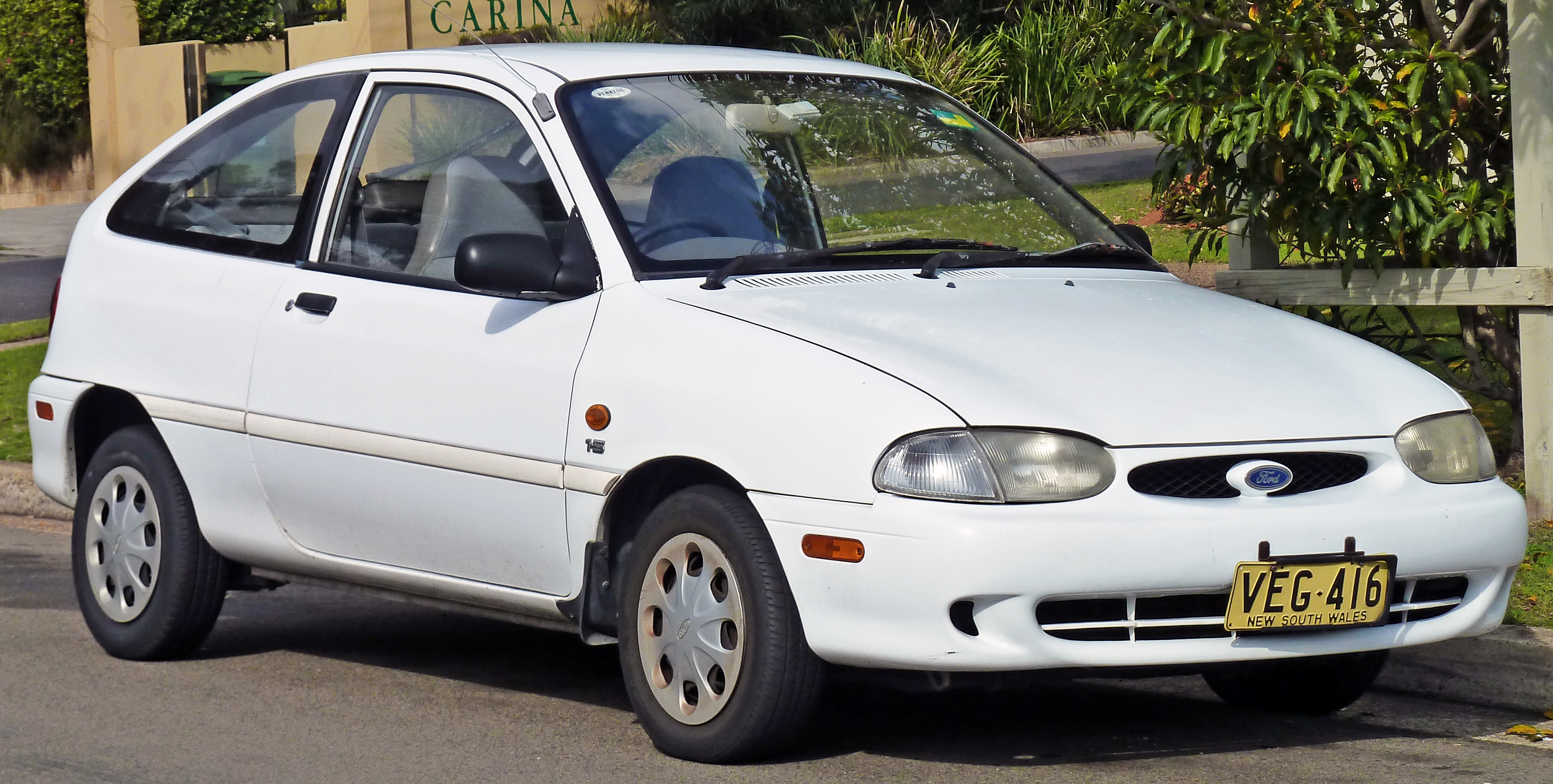
Facelifted Ford Festiva Trio S 3-door (Australia)

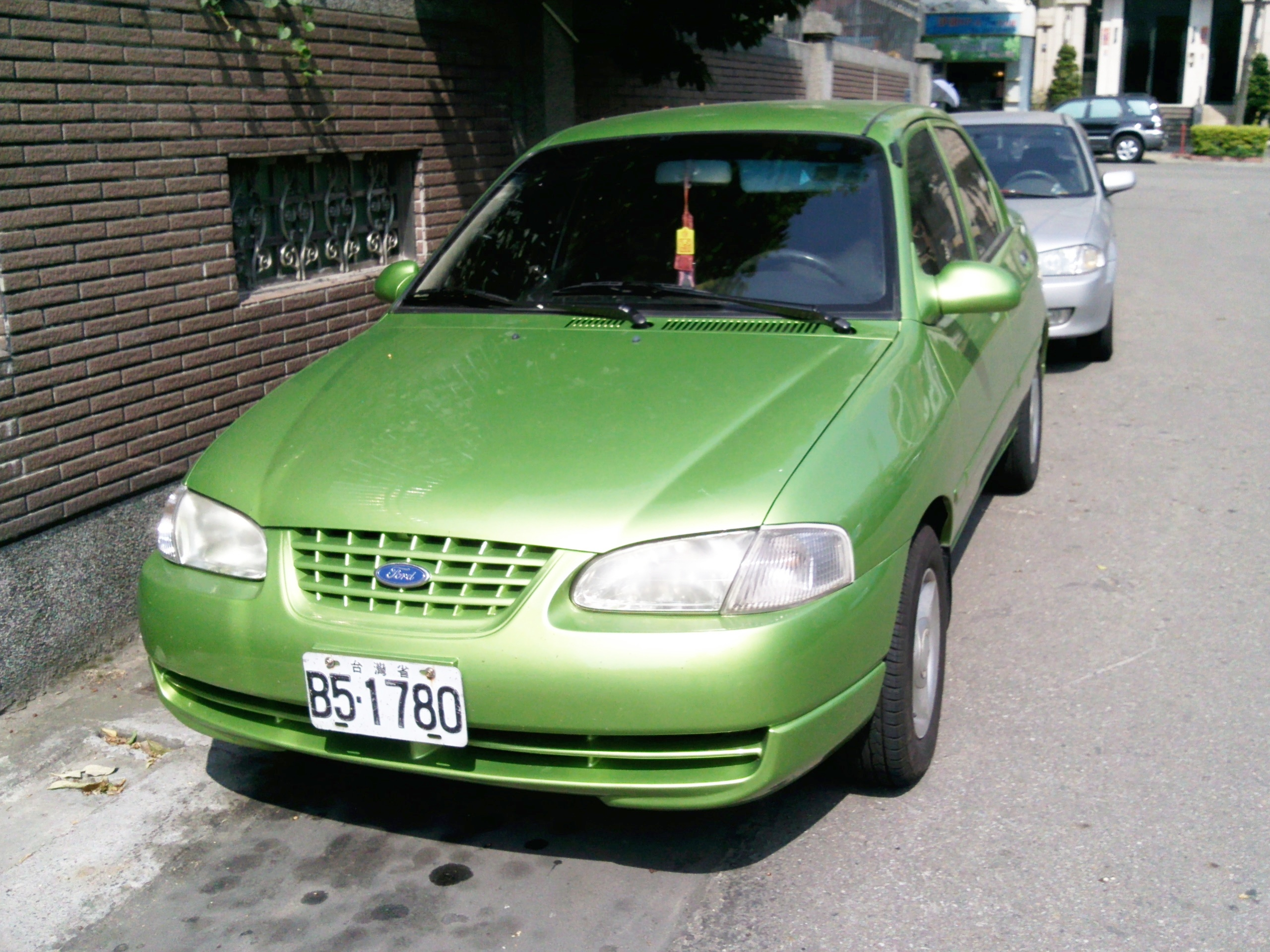
Facelift Ford Festiva sedan (Taiwan)

In 1997, the Festiva received a new front bumper with an oval grille, reshaped headlamps, and other minor changes. The Aspire was dropped from the Ford range in the United States after 1997.

The second generation Festiva continued to be sold in Australia until 2000 when it was replaced by the Ford Ka. Australian second-generation Festivas have U.S. side marker light cut-outs on each side of the vehicle (driver-side and passenger-side) at the front and rear. Instead of housing orange reflectors/lights at the front sides and red reflectors/lights at the rear sides, there are non-lit orange reflectors at all four locations. These redundant reflectors, coupled with the orange side indicator repeater (which is not required in the U.S., and was not included on the Aspire) make for a unique side profile.

Kia developed their following model, the Kia Rio, completely independently, and finished their relationship with Ford.

Like the first generation, the 2008 edition of the Used Car Safety Ratings (UCSR) by Monash University in Australia found the second series Festiva to provide a "worse than average" (two out of five stars) safety protection level in the event of an accident. In the 2010 edition, the scoring was downgraded to "very poor" (equivalent to one of five stars, or the "significantly worse than average" terminology used in 2008).

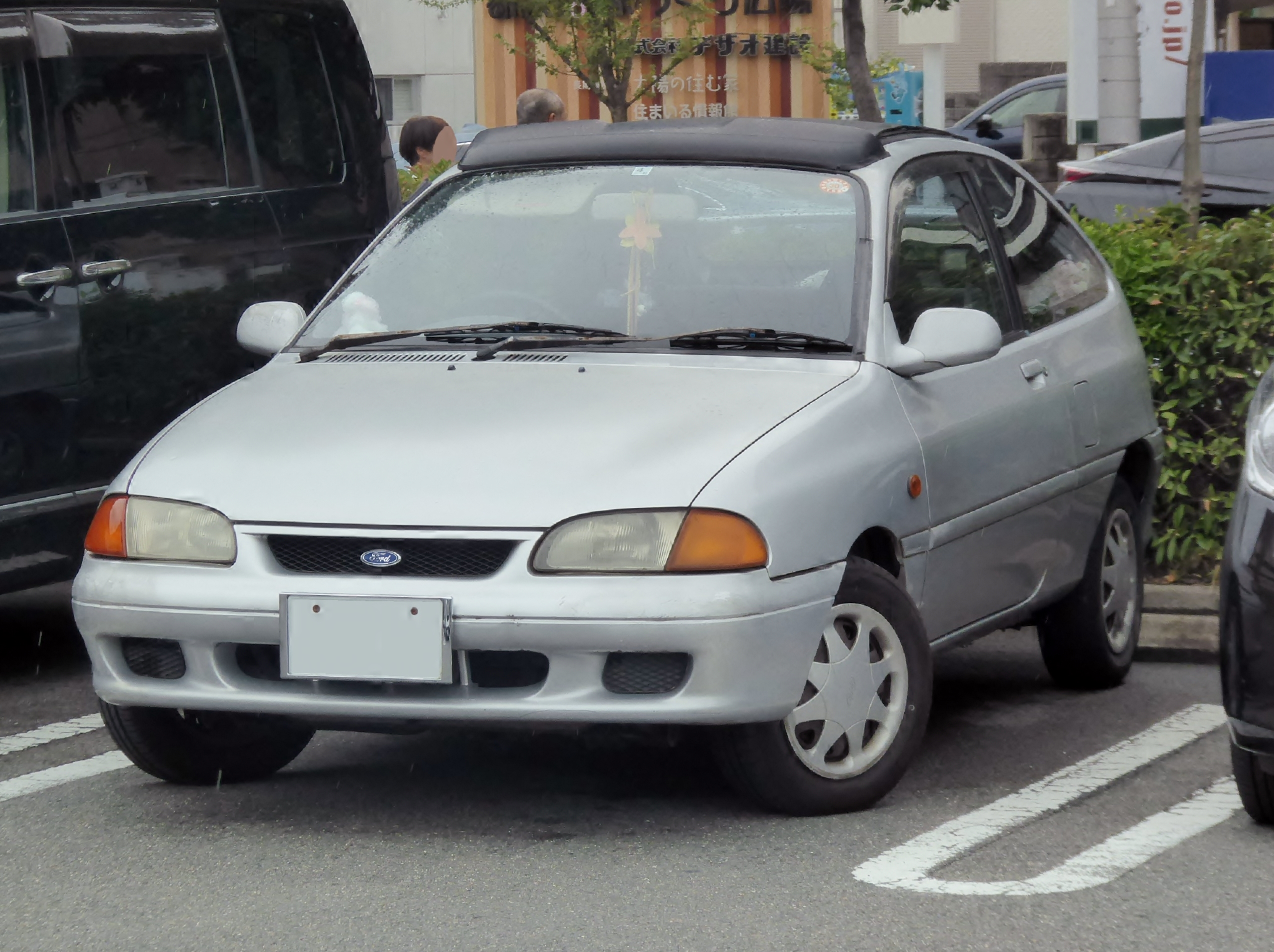
The sporting Festiva JZ (Japan)

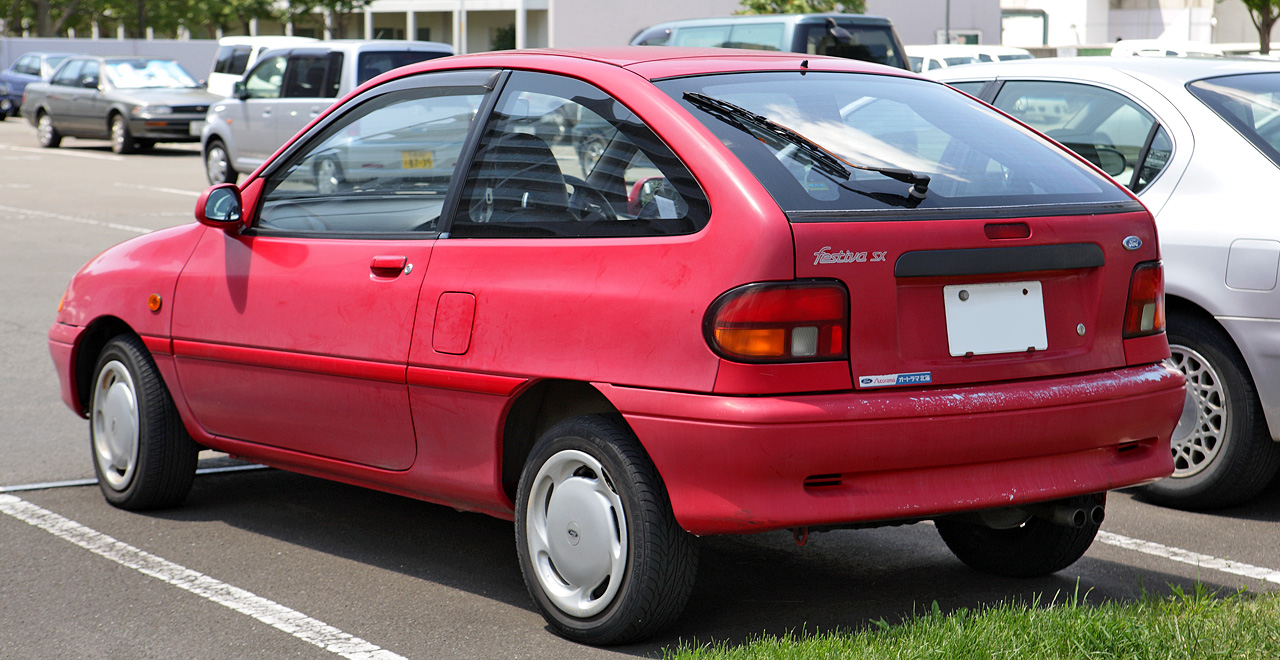
Pre-facelift Ford Festiva SX 3-door (Japan)

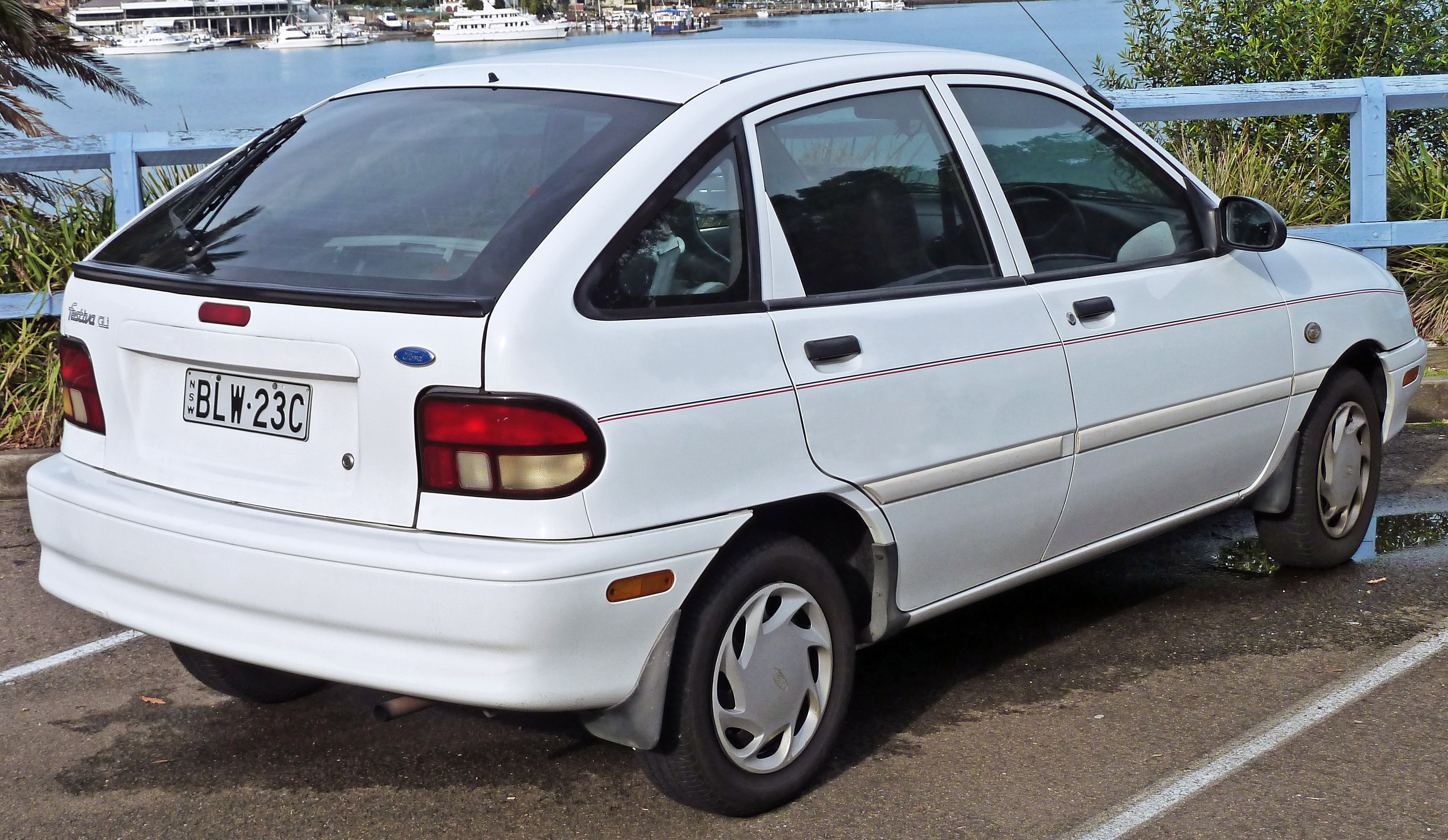
Pre-facelift Ford Festiva GLi 5-door (Australia)

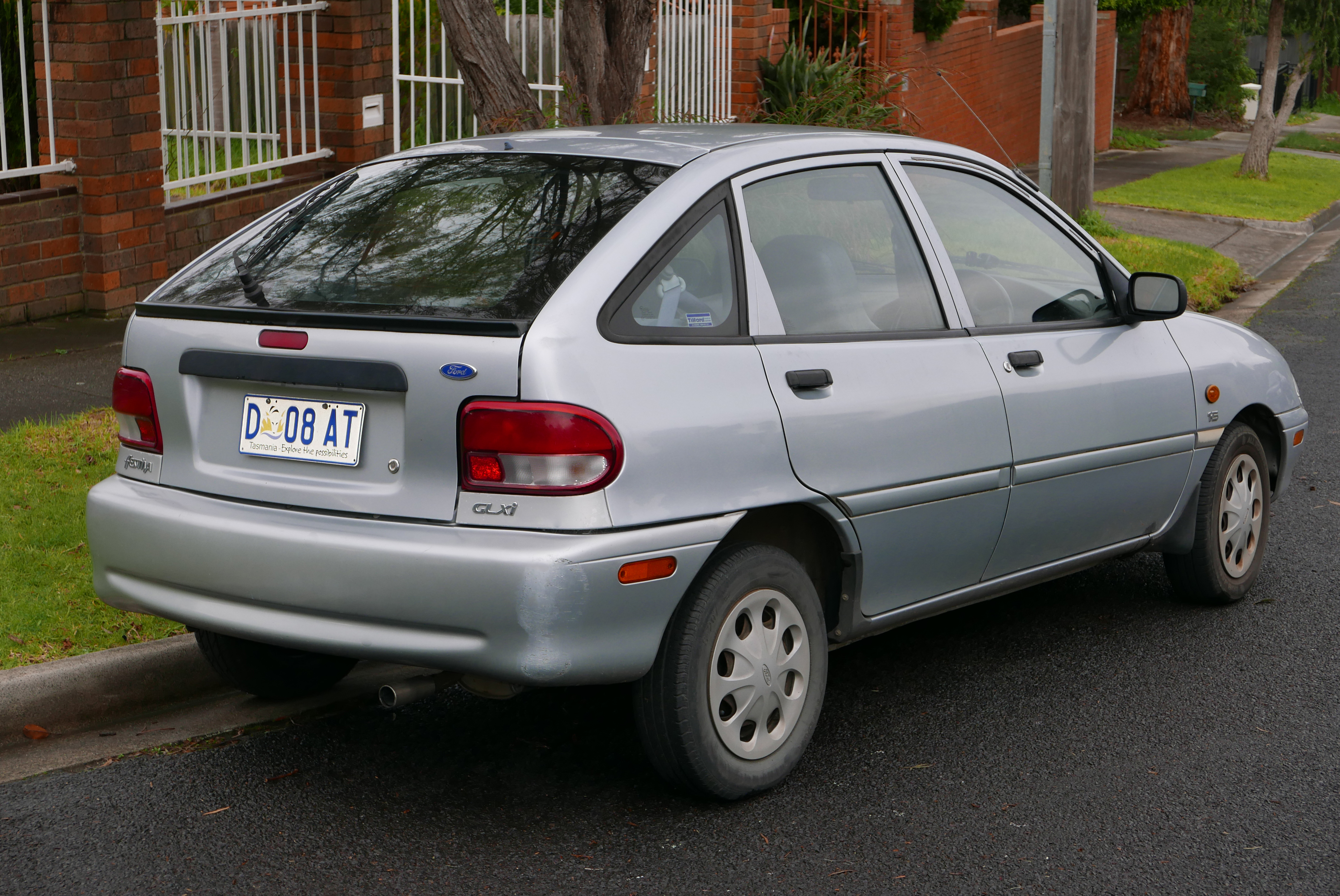
Facelift Ford Festiva GLXi 5-door (Australia)

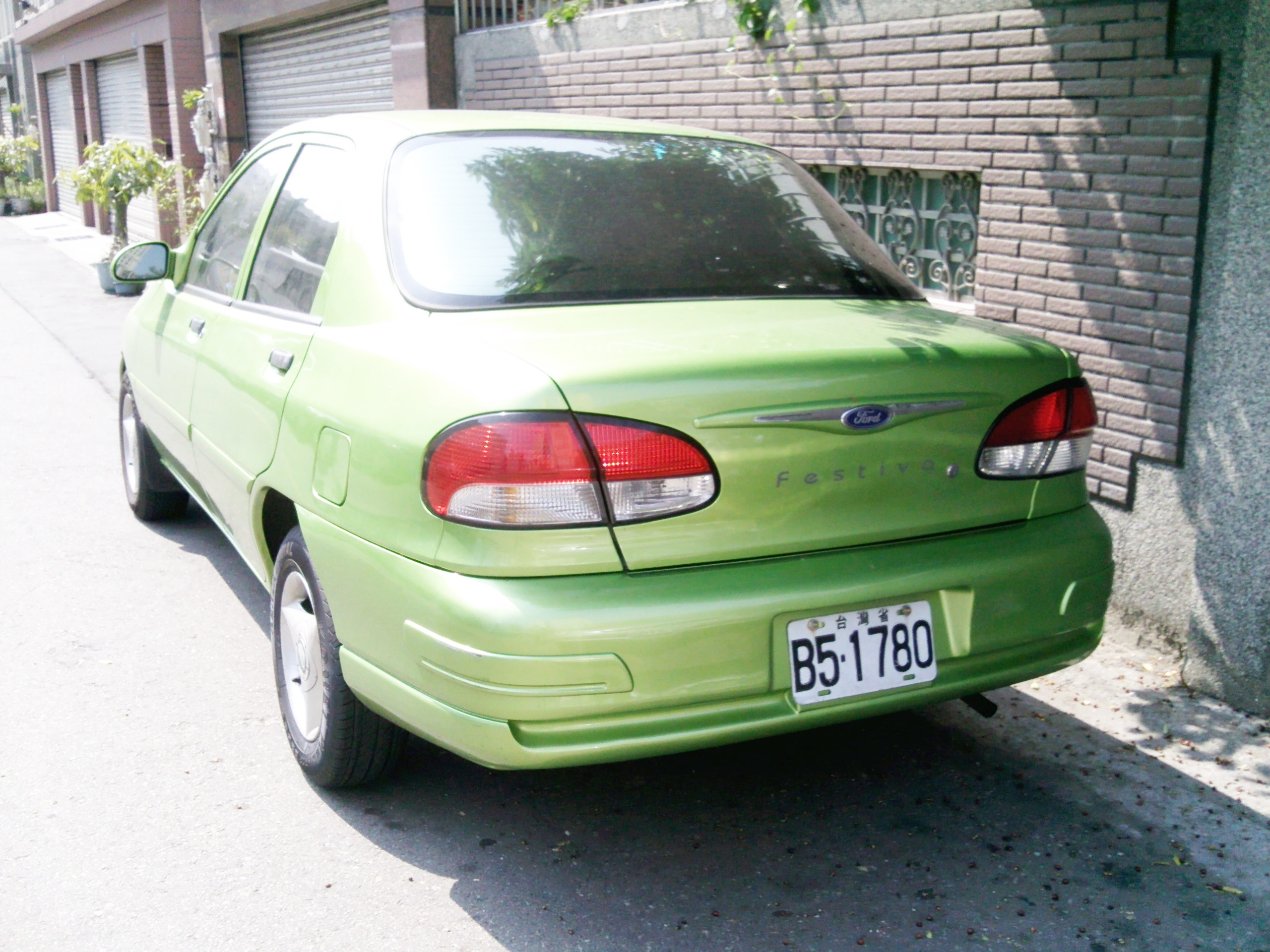
Facelift Ford Festiva sedan (Taiwan)

=== Ford Aspire ===
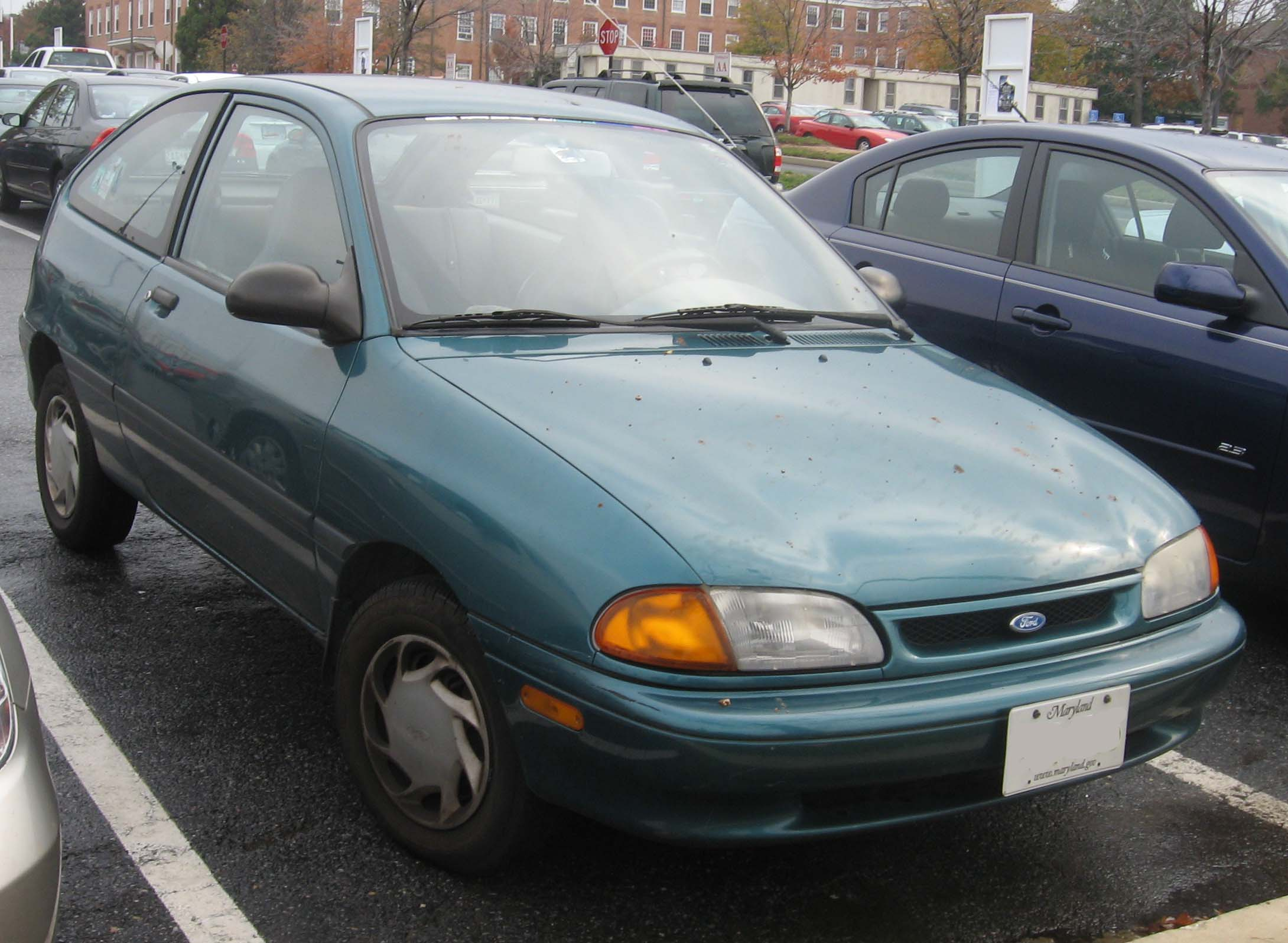
1994–1996 Ford Aspire three-door

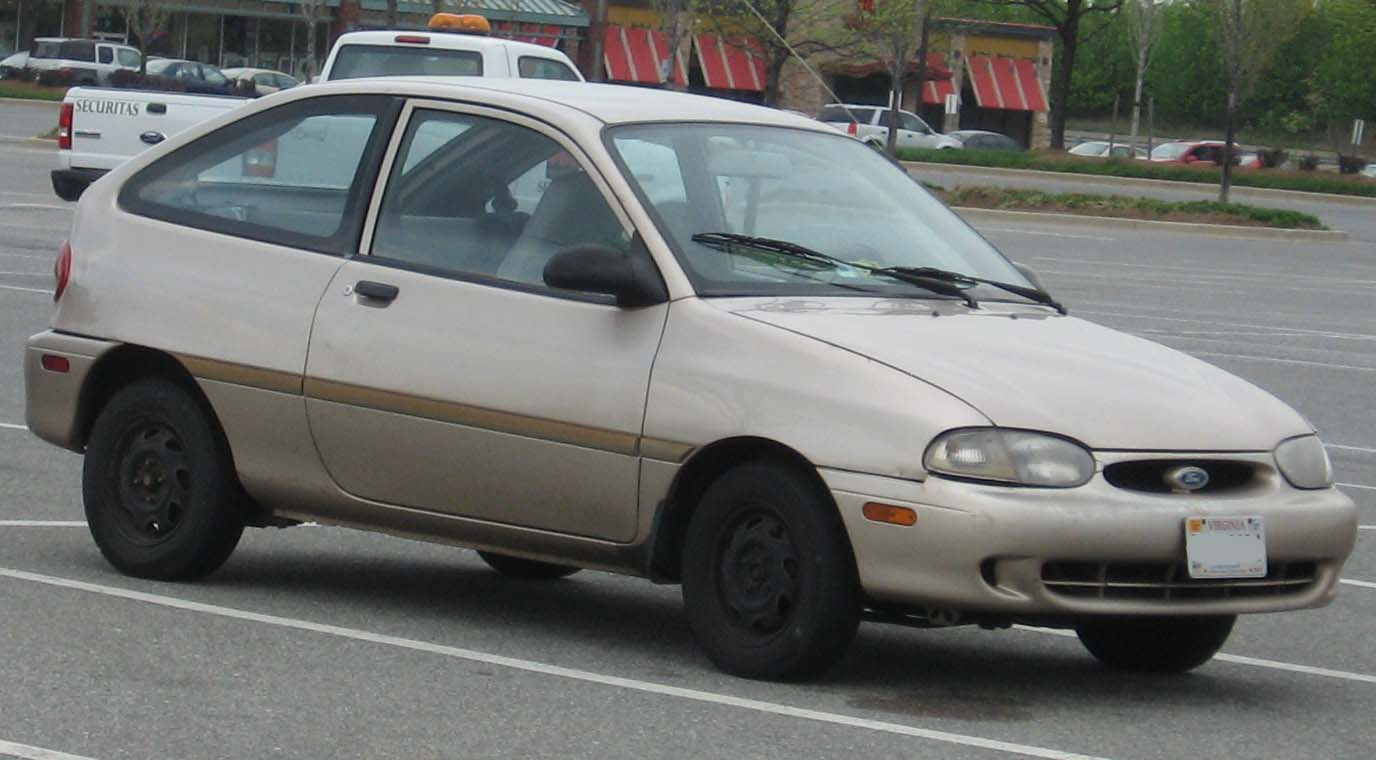
1997 Ford Aspire three-door

The Ford Aspire was sold in North America from 1994 until 1997. It was the replacement for the Ford Festiva. It was the first car in its class to have dual airbags standard and anti-lock brakes optional. It came in three- and five-door hatchback body styles. The 3-door was available in base and SE trim while the 5-door was only available in base trim. The SE model offered a sporting package that consisted of fog lights, rear spoiler, alloy wheels, blue face instrument cluster with tachometer, and upgraded interior trim. The Aspire had very few options for the base model: cassette player, automatic transmission, rear defrost and wiper, alloy wheels, and a comfort and convenience package that had several minor interior upgrades. Due to slow sales the SE model was dropped after 1995 along with all of its optional equipment. The base model also lost its optional alloy wheels and rear wiper. The performance with the automatic was slower than the manual, with 0–60 mph times of 16.2 seconds. Power steering was only available with the 5-door automatic. The Aspire was given a facelift in 1997 with redesigned front and rear bumpers, a new radio, and new seat facings. The Aspire was discontinued after 1997, due to slow sales.

=== Kia Avella ===
The version of the Festiva sold in Korea, from March 1994, was badged "Kia Avella". "Avella" was a made-up word combining aveo (Latin for "desire") and ella (Spanish for "she") to create an equivalent phrase of "I want her". Available in sedan (Avella Delta), three-door and five-door hatchback body styles. Sales of the Kia Avella totalled 115,576 between 1994 and 1995 but dropped to only 27,850 in 1998. The Avella was primarily intended for export markets carrying Ford badging, as South Korean customers tended to prefer sedans over hatchbacks. It was sold in a very few export markets with Kia badging, such as Malta and Russia. The Kia Avella was discontinued in 1999 although production for some export markets continued until 2000; it and the Pride (first generation Festiva) were collectively replaced by the Kia Rio in 1999.

All Avellas came standard with 13 inch wheels, a four-speaker stereo, heated rear glass, anti-lock brakes (ABS), driver's side airbag, and door impact beams. Optional equipment included air conditioning, power locks, power mirrors, power windows, folding rear seats, dimming interior mirror, a tachometer, and aluminum wheels. The Avella was the first South Korean car in its class to offer dual airbags and ABS-brakes. The Delta version received a slightly reworked front end from its hatchback siblings.

While the standard Avellas received the 73 PS (54 kW) 1.3-litre Mazda B3 engine, higher spec versions were available both with an SOHC and a more powerful DOHC version of the 1.5-litre B5 engine. The 105 PS (77 kW) DOHC version was only available in the four-door Avella Delta. Five-speed manuals as well as three- or four-speed automatic transmissions were available.

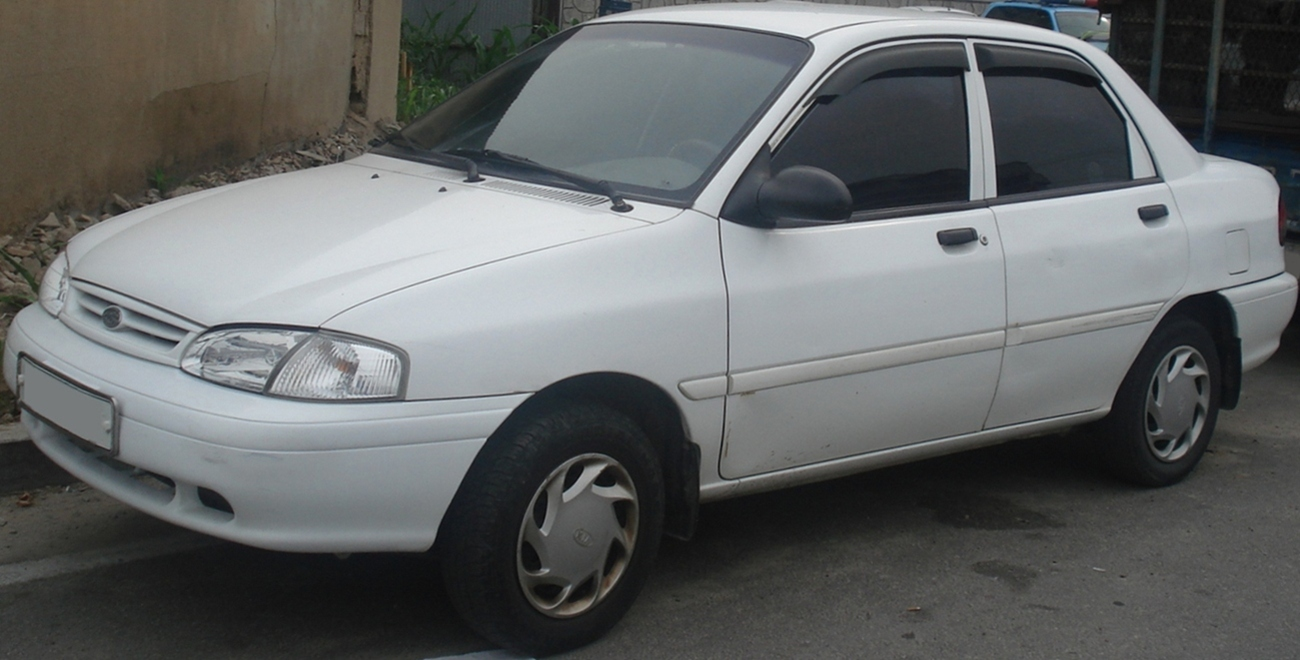
Pre-facelift Kia Avella Delta sedan (South Korea)

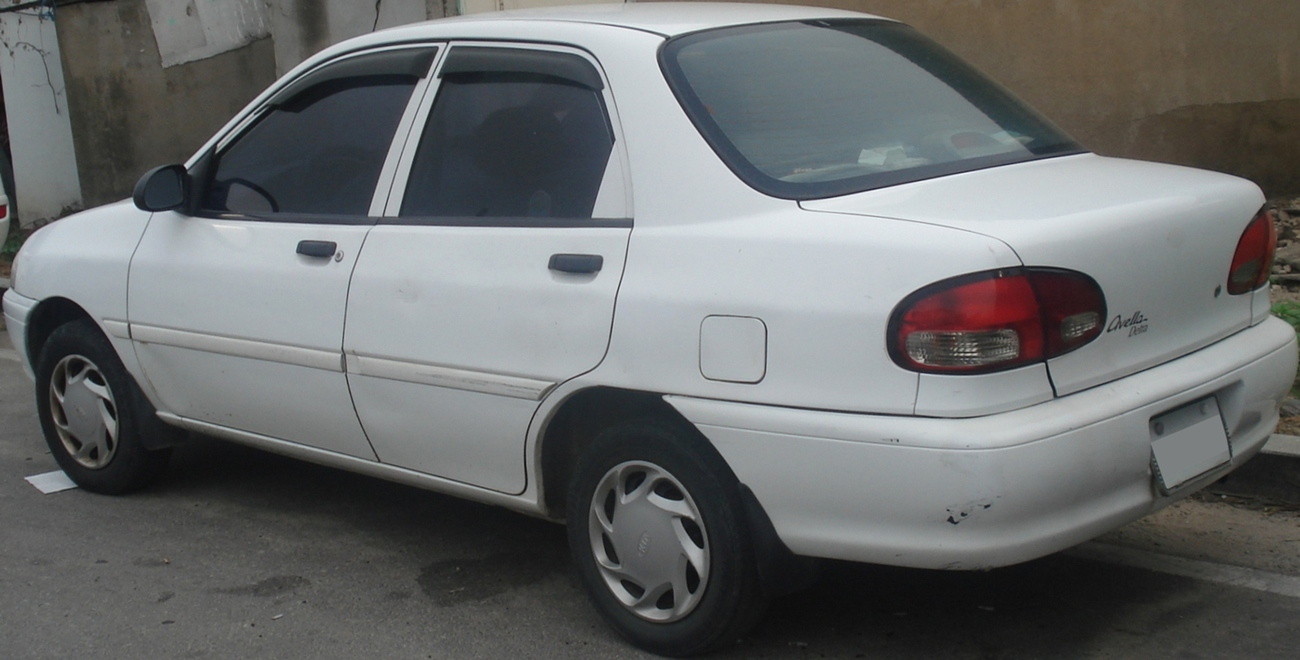
Pre-facelift Kia Avella Delta sedan (South Korea)

== Third generation (1996) ==
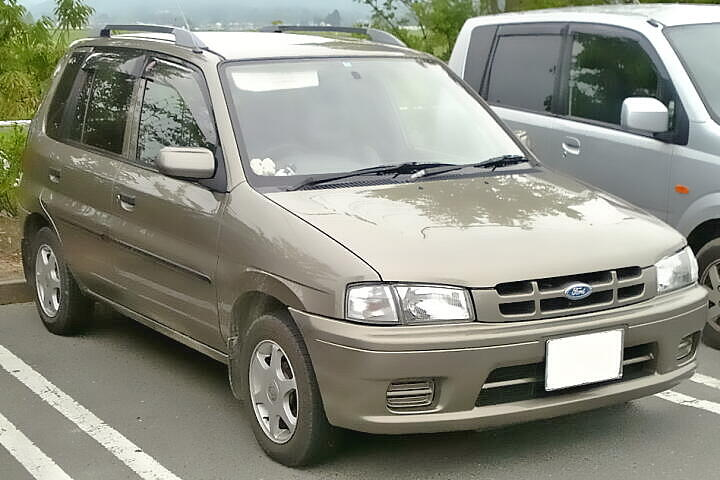
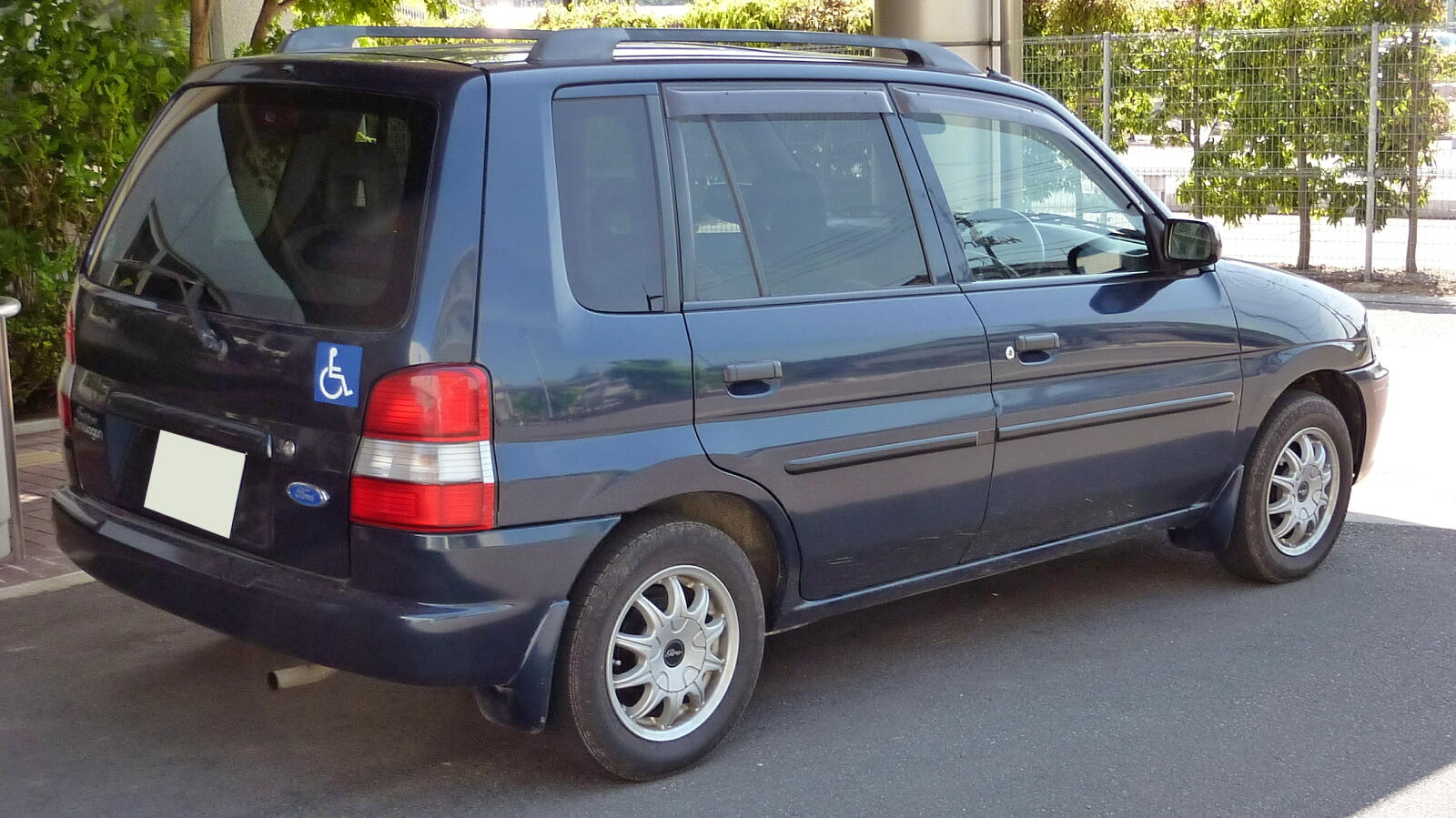
Ford Festiva Mini Wagon (Japan)

Sales of the second generation Festiva ended in 1996 for the Japanese market, being replaced by generation three—a badge engineered Mazda Demio (DW). Known as the "Ford Festiva Mini Wagon", the Japanese-only model range consisted of a single five-door hatchback body style available with either a 1.3- or 1.5-litre engine. Transmission options were a three-speed or four-speed automatic and a five-speed manual. Production continued until Mazda ceased manufacture of the equivalent Demio in 2002.
