= Rick Titus (journalist) =

American journalist

Rick Titus is an American former race car driver and now automotive journalist, radio personality and podcaster. Titus hosts Drivers Talk Radio, a syndicated radio program and weekly automotive podcast. He is the son of another former race driver-turned-journalist, Jerry Titus.

As a driver, Titus won 11 races on the SCCA Endurance Road Racing circuit. His hands-on involvement with cars and trucks, including a stint as head of engineering at a leading automotive accessories manufacturer, led him to a career in journalism after he retired from racing.

Titus has written over 350 articles or segments for several magazines, including Motor Trend (as Technical Editor), Popular Mechanics (as West Coast Automotive Editor), TNN (as NASCAR Editor), Muscle Mustangs and Fast Fords (as Engineering Editor), Road & Track (as Features Editor) and Sports Car magazine (as Technical Editor).

In addition, Titus is a spokesman for Ford Motor Company and has appeared in several ad campaigns and product information videos for various Ford vehicles. He is a lifetime member of the American Automotive Racing Writers and Broadcasters Association (AARWBA) as well as a member of the Motor Press Guild.

In 1990, Chuck Beck of Special Editions and Rick Titus took seven Ford Festivas, gutted the interiors, and mounted Ford SHO (Yamaha-built for the Taurus SHO) 3.0 liter V6s behind the front seats to make the car mid-engined. There were substantial cosmetic and mechanical changes, including relocating the gas tank to the front of the car, structural bracing and improvements to the chassis, adding wider wheel arches to accommodate a wider stance and larger tires, and a complete redesign of the suspension. These changes resulted in a car that could accelerate from 0–60 miles per hour (0–97 km/h) in 4.6 seconds, travel the quarter-mile (0.4 km) in 12.9 seconds at 100.9 miles per hour (162.4 km/h), and could achieve a lateral acceleration figure ranging from .95 to 1.04 g. It was called the SHOgun.
