= Coupé utility =

Automotive body style

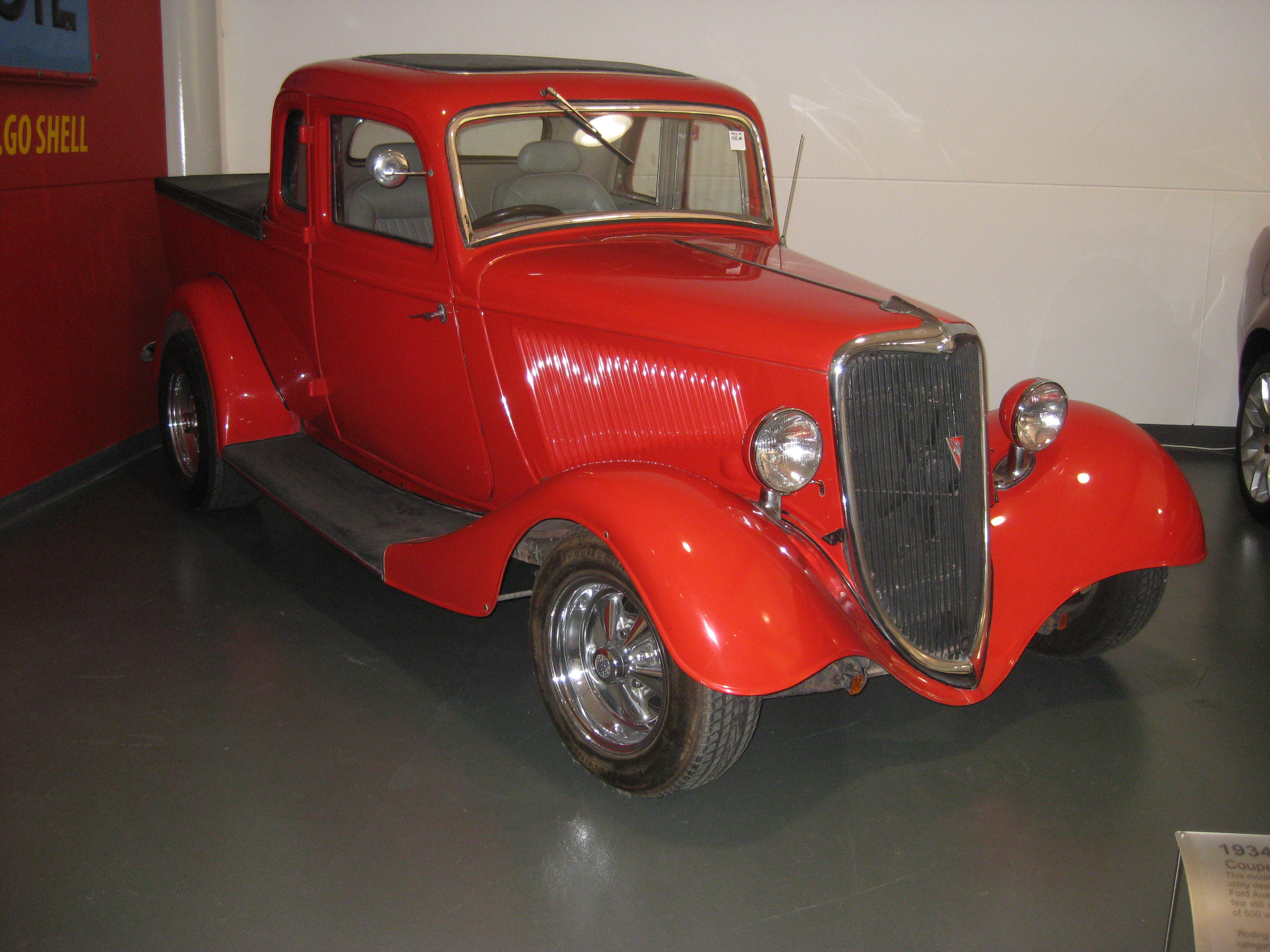
1934 Ford, the first coupe utility model. On display at the National Motor Museum, Birdwood, South Australia.

A coupé utility is a vehicle with a passenger compartment at the front and an integrated cargo tray at the rear, with the front of the cargo tray forming the rear wall of the passenger compartment.

The term originated in the 1930s, where it was used to distinguish passenger-car-based two-door vehicles with an integrated cargo tray from traditional two-door pickup trucks which have a cargo bed separate from the passenger compartment. Since the 2000s, this type of vehicle has also been referred to as a "pickup", "car-based pick-up", "car-based truck" or "compact pickup truck".

In Australia, where the traditional style of coupé utility remained popular until production ceased in 2017, with the Holden Commodore (VF). It is commonly called a "ute".

== History ==
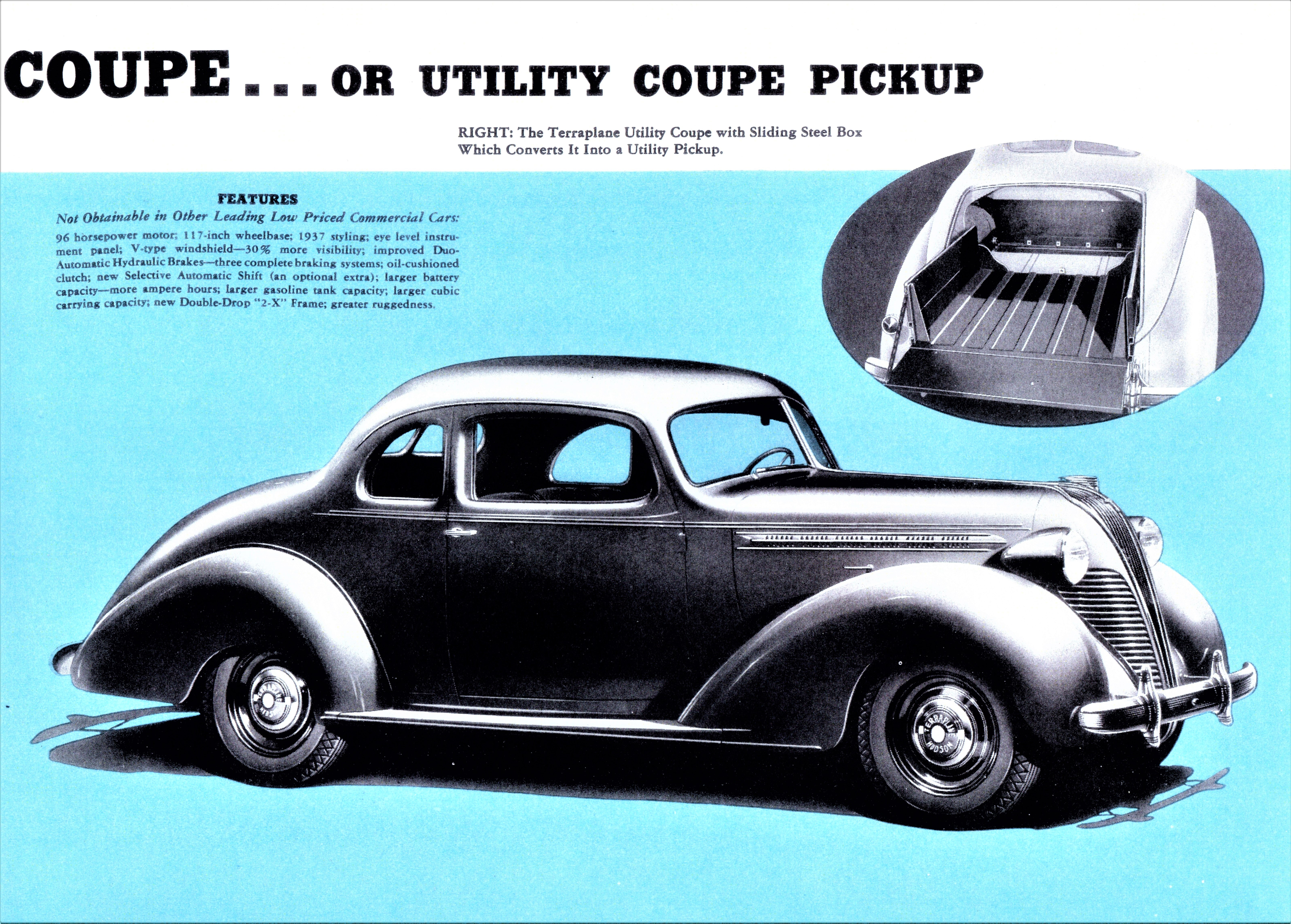
1937 Terraplane Utility Coupe, convertible to Pickup

The body style originated in Australia. It was the result of a 1932 letter from the wife of a farmer in Victoria, Australia, to Ford Australia asking for "a vehicle to go to church in on a Sunday and which can carry our pigs to market on Mondays". In response, Ford designer Lew Bandt developed a vehicle to meet the client's request. Commencing in October 1933, with assistance from draftsman A. Scott, Bandt used the passenger compartment and roof from the Ford V8 five-window coupe and extended the rear section using a single fixed side panel on each side, with a hinged tailgate at the rear to create the load carrying compartment.

The model was released in July 1934 as the coupe utility. In his book Early Australian Automotive Design: The First Fifty Years, Australian motoring historian Norm Darwin suggests the idea was not a big leap in design from existing roadster utility models produced by various manufacturers as early as 1924. Darwin also suggests that the idea was being developed by other manufacturers simultaneously, because General Motors-Holden released Bedford and Chevrolet coupe utilities in September 1934, only two months after Ford, with the main difference being the use of the three-window coupe roof on the GM-H products. Other manufacturers were quick to follow, with coupe utilities based on various passenger and light truck chassis.

In North America, the idea was also trialed by some manufacturers. Studebaker created the Studebaker Coupe Express and sold it between 1937 and 1939.

In 1951, Holden released a model based on its 48-215 sedan, reinforcing the Australian tradition of home-grown two-door passenger-car sedan chassis-based "utility" vehicles with a tray at the back, known colloquially as a "ute", although the term was also applied to larger vehicles such as pickup trucks.

America followed suit with the release of the Ford Ranchero in 1957 and Chevrolet El Camino in 1959.

== North American models ==
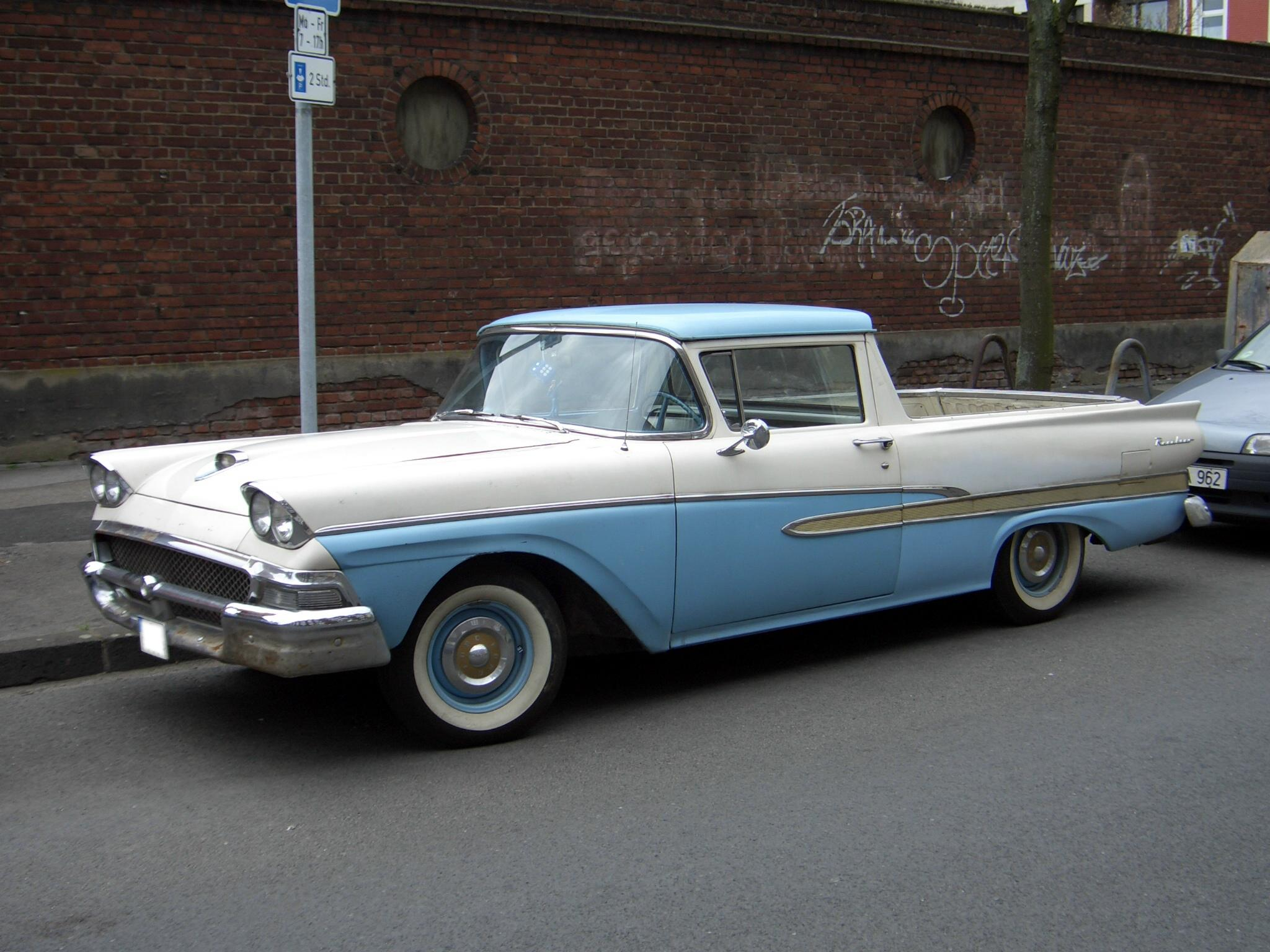
1958 Ford Ranchero

Ford Ranchero

The first modern American coupe utility was the Ford Ranchero, marketed by Ford from the 1957–1979 model years. In contrast to its F-Series pickup trucks (which used a dedicated truck body and chassis), the Ranchero was adapted from a Ford two-door station wagon, integrating the cargo bed with the two-door body. Originally derived from the full-size 1957 Ford chassis, the Ranchero would also be designed from the compact Ford Falcon and intermediate Ford Torino and Ford LTD II.

In total, 508,355 Rancheros were sold during its production run. The market success of the first generation led General Motors to develop its own design for 1959, the Chevrolet El Camino.

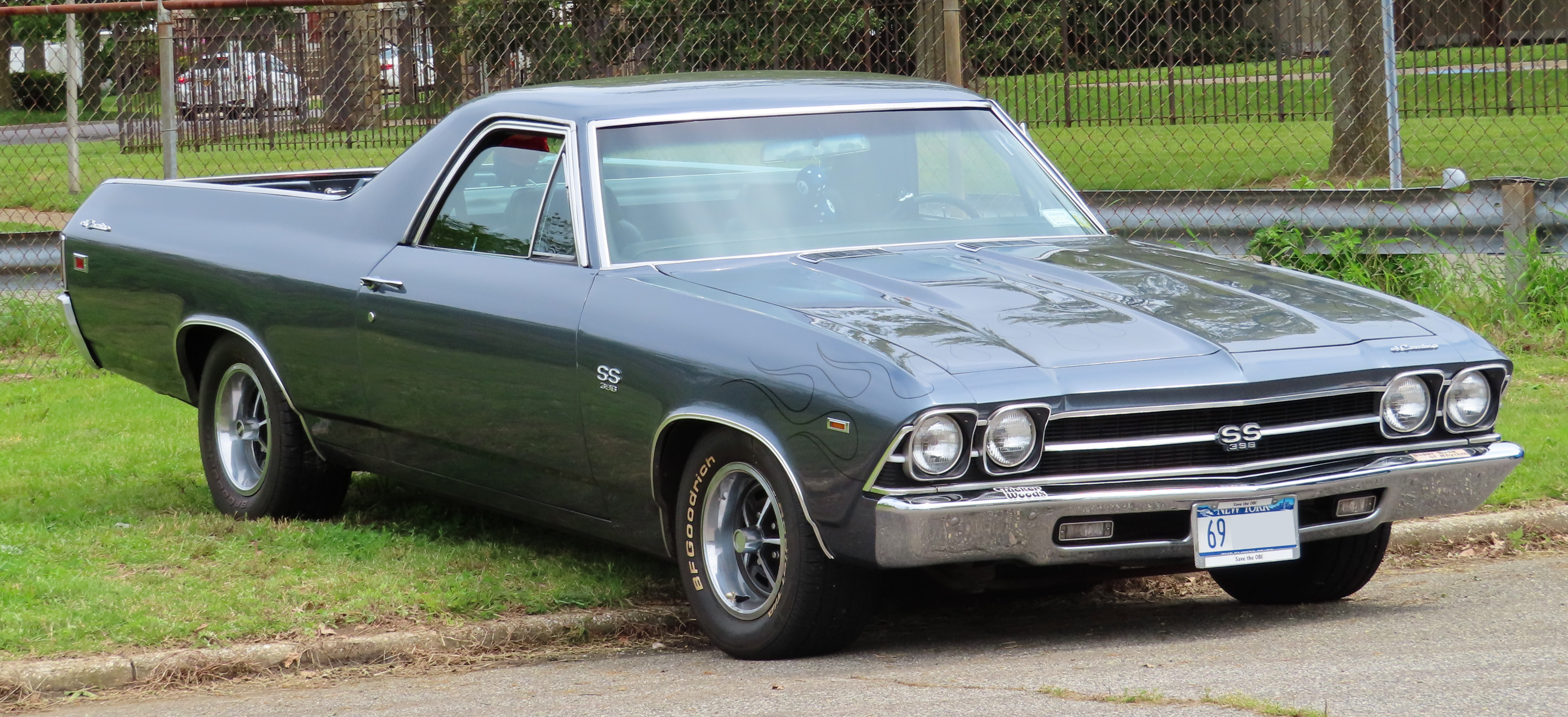
1969 Chevrolet El Camino

Chevrolet El Camino

The Chevrolet El Camino is a coupé utility/pickup produced by Chevrolet. Following the success of the Ford Ranchero, the El Camino was introduced for 1959, deriving its body from the two-door Brookwood station wagon (though fitted with Bel Air trim); after 1960, the model line was withdrawn in favor of the van-based Chevrolet Corvair Greenbrier pickup.

For 1964, Chevrolet reintroduced the El Camino, with the line adopting its design from the intermediate two-door Chevrolet Chevelle station wagon (moving to the A-body platform). After GM ended production of two-door Chevelle wagons, the El Camino retained commonality with four-door wagons (for rear bodywork), but adopted its own roofline. For the 1971 model year, GMC began to market the El Camino as the GMC Sprint. As the A-body Chevrolet was downsized and renamed the Malibu for 1978, the El Camino was also downsized (becoming a long-wheelbase variant of the A-body chassis, renamed the G-body for 1982); the GMC Sprint was renamed the GMC Caballero.

Though sharing its bodywork and chassis underpinnings with Chevrolet car lines, the El Camino was classified and titled in North America as a light truck.

Dodge Rampage

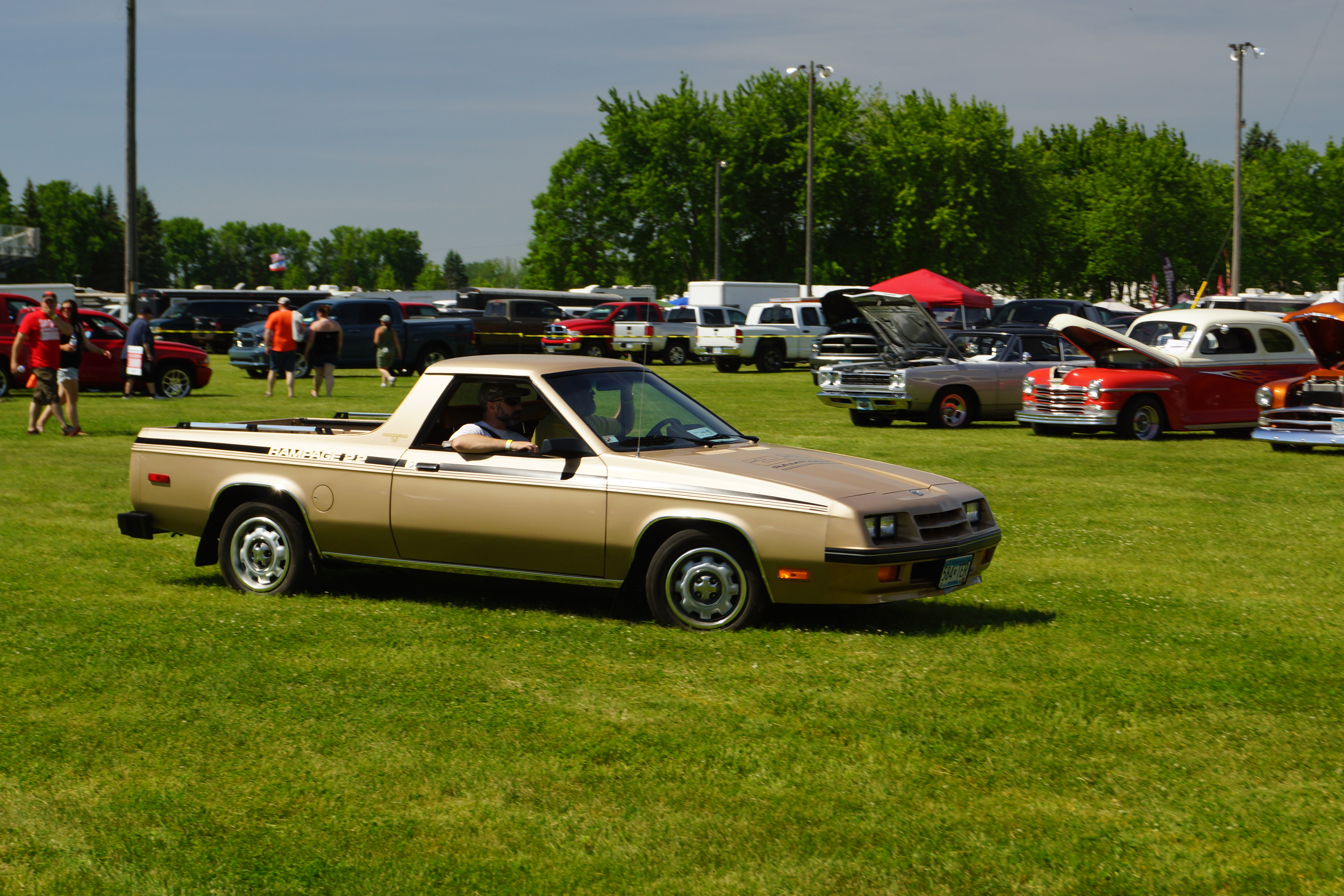
1984 Dodge Rampage

The Dodge Rampage is a coupé utility/pickup that was marketed by Dodge from the 1982–1984 model years. Following the introduction of the Volkswagen Rabbit Pickup and the Subaru BRAT, the Rampage was developed from the Dodge Omni 024 hatchback (later the Dodge Charger). The first compact pickup truck designed by Chrysler Corporation, the Rampage was the first American-brand pickup truck with front-wheel drive (though featuring a payload capacity rivaling the larger El Camino).

The model line was marketed by Plymouth as the Plymouth Scamp for 1983 only, becoming the final light truck sold by the brand.

Other North American coupé utilities

- 1936–1942 Chevrolet Coupe Delivery
- 1937–1942 Hudson Terraplane Utility Coupe
- 1937–1939 Studebaker Coupe Express
- 1981–1982 Ford Durango
- 2015–present Ram 700 (Mexico-exclusive rebadged version of the Fiat Strada)

== South American models ==
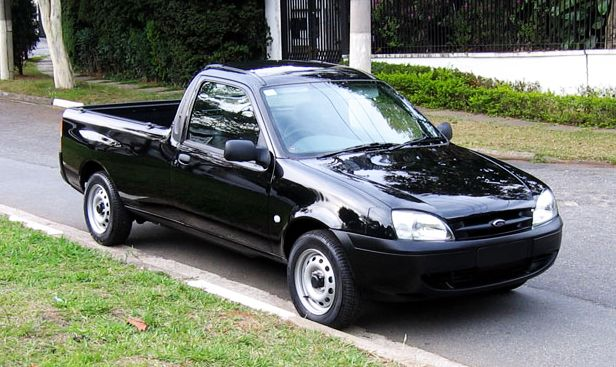
2000–2010 Ford Courier

Since the 1970s, utes have been built in Brazil, usually based on hatchbacks. Current examples include the Chevrolet Montana, based on the Onix; the Volkswagen Saveiro, based on the Gol; and the Fiat Strada, based on the Argo. Unlike previous generations, the current Montana and Strada have different frnt-end bodywork than their sister models.

Other South American coupé utility models:

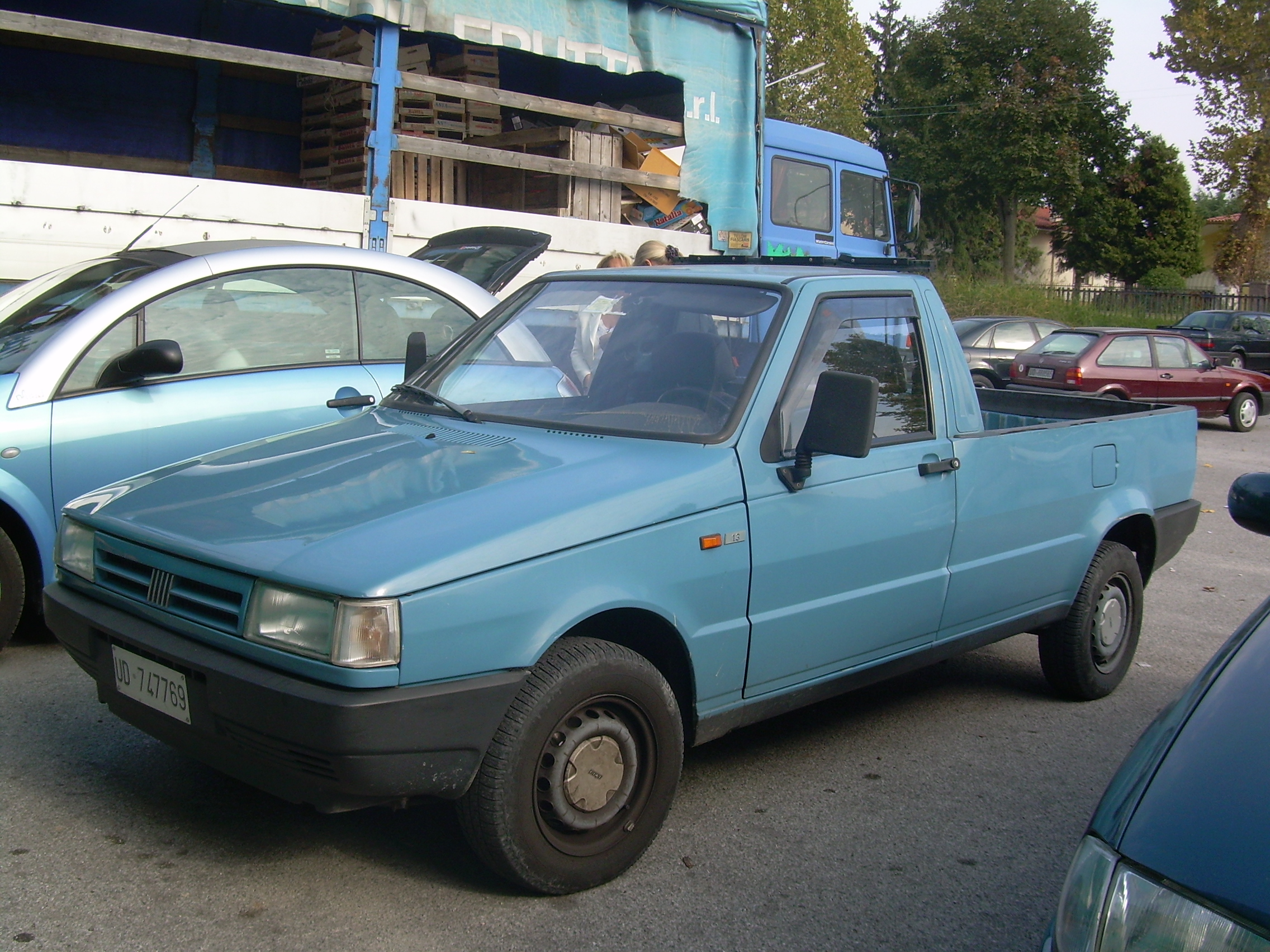
Fiat Fiorino pick-up

- 1983–1994 Chevrolet Chevy 500 (Brazil)
- 2003–present Chevrolet Montana
- 1994–2004 Chevrolet Corsa Pick Up (Argentina and Brazil)
- 1953–1979 Citroën 2CV "Citroneta" (South America only)
- 1976-1987 Fiat 147 City (Brazil)
- 1977–2013 Fiat Fiorino
- 1971–1990 Dodge 1500 (Uruguay)
- 1996–present Fiat Strada
- 1998–2013 Ford Courier (Brazil)
- 1973–1991 Ford Falcon Ranchero (Argentina)
- 1982–1997 Ford Pampa (Brazil)
- 2010–2014 Peugeot Hoggar
- 1982–present Volkswagen Saveiro/Pointer coupé utility

== Asian models ==
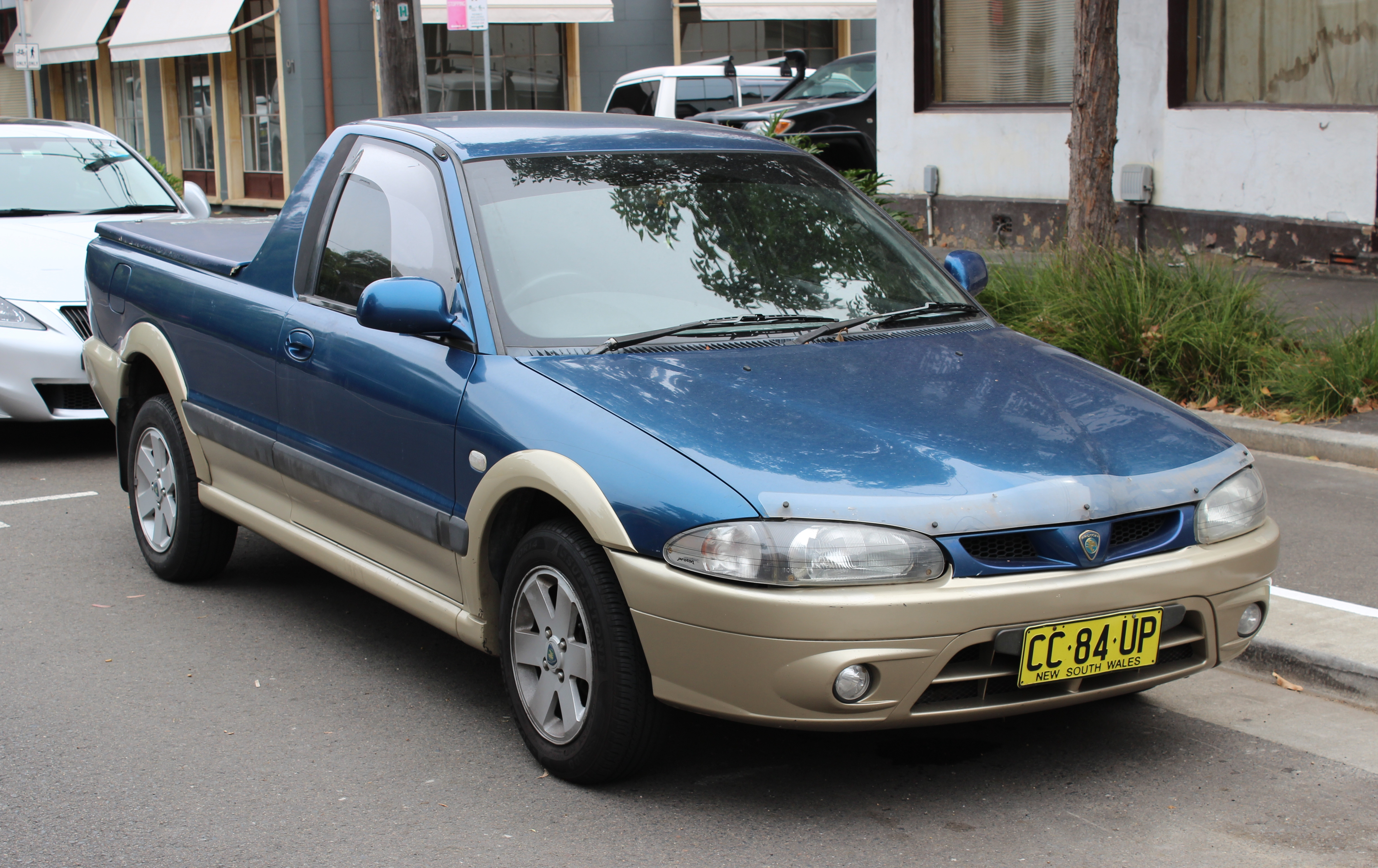
Proton Jumbuck

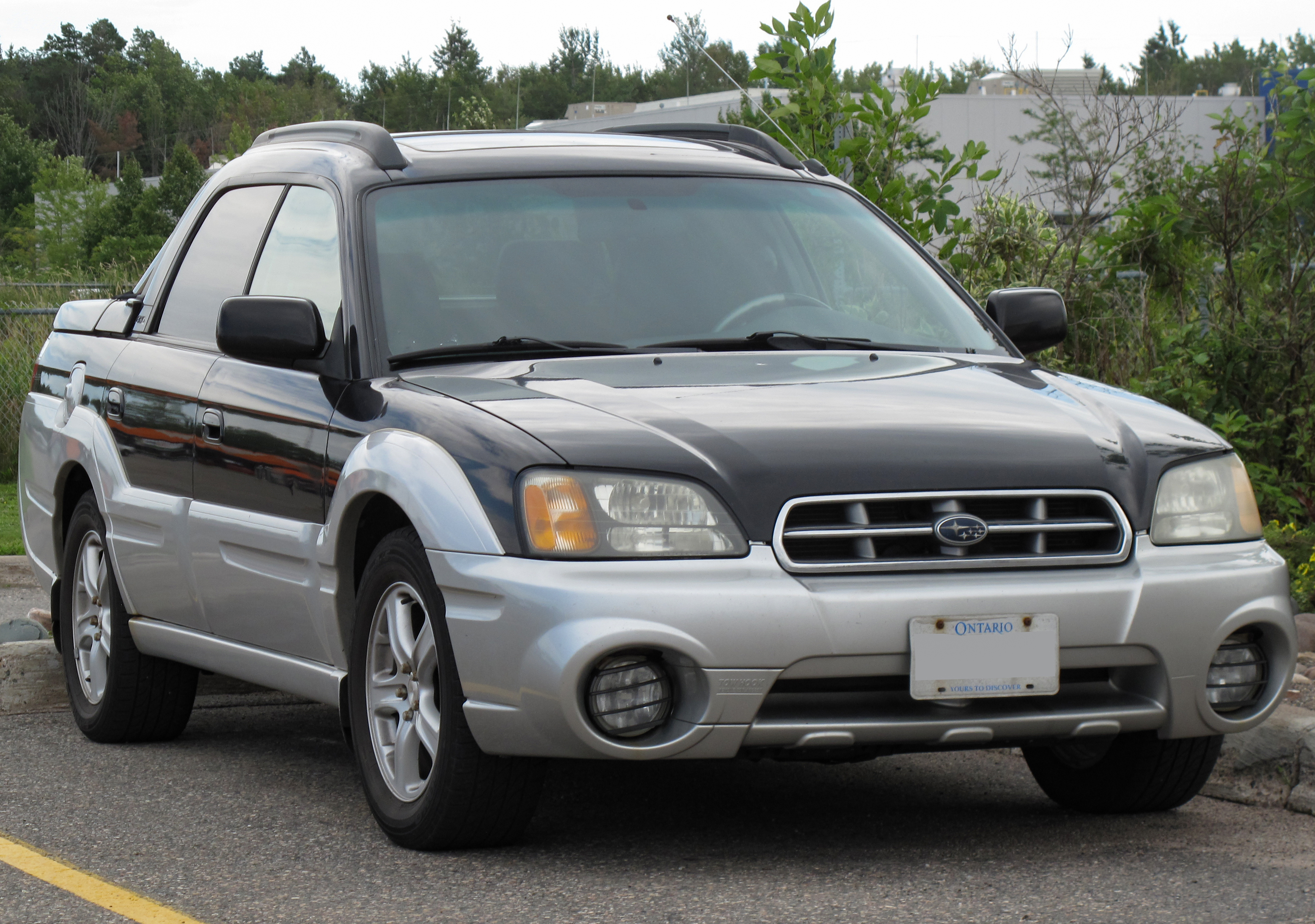
2003 Subaru Baja

- 1991–1995 Daihatsu Mira P1/Miracab
- 2004–2007 Geely Rural Nanny
- 1975–1990 Hyundai Pony
- 2022–present Hyundai Santa Cruz
- 1974–1981 Kia Brisa pickup (rebadged second generation Mazda Familia pickup)
- 1964–1991 Mazda Familia pickup
- 1978-1980, 1990-1997 Mazda Familia pickup (Indonesian version, based on fourth generation Familia)
- 1965–1971 Mitsubishi Colt 800
- 1971–2007 Nissan Sunny
- 1990–1998 Nissan NV (Thailand domestic models built under license)
- 1955–1957 Prince Commercial Pickup AIPC-1/AIPC-2
- 1957–1967 Prince Skyway pickup
- 2002–2010 Proton Arena/Jumbuck
- 2002–2006 Subaru Baja (sold in the US, Canada and Chile)
- 1978–1993 Subaru BRAT/Brumby/Shifter/MV/Targa
- 1983–1988 Suzuki Mighty Boy
- 2000–2001 Toyota bB Open Deck
- 1960–1969 Toyota Corona coupé utility
- 1959–1971 Toyopet/Toyota Crown Masterline coupé utility
- 1955–1959 Toyopet Masterline
- 1968–1974 Toyota Mark II coupé utility
- 1964–1988 Toyota Publica coupé utility/Toyota coupé utility

=== Iranian models ===
- 1969–2015 Paykan "Vanet"/IKCO Bardo (based on Paykan)
- 2014–present Saipa 151 (based on First-generation Ford Festiva)
- 2015–present IKCO Arisun (based on Peugeot 405/Peugeot ROA)

== South African models ==
Australian Holden Kingswood, Ford Falcon and Chrysler Valiant utes were sold in South Africa as the Chevrolet El Camino, Ford Ranchero, and Valiant Rustler respectively. Some re-badged versions of South American utes are sold in South Africa (where the term "bakkie" instead of "ute" is popular) under different names, such as the Chevrolet Montana and the Ford Courier, sold there as Opel Corsa Utility (later as Chevrolet Utility) and Ford Bantam respectively.

Other South African coupé utility models:

- 1975–1979 Dodge Husky (South Africa)
- 1989–2002 Mazda Rustler (rebadged 2nd generation Ford Bantam)
- 2008–present Nissan NP200 (rebadged Dacia Logan Pick-Up, built and sold in South Africa)
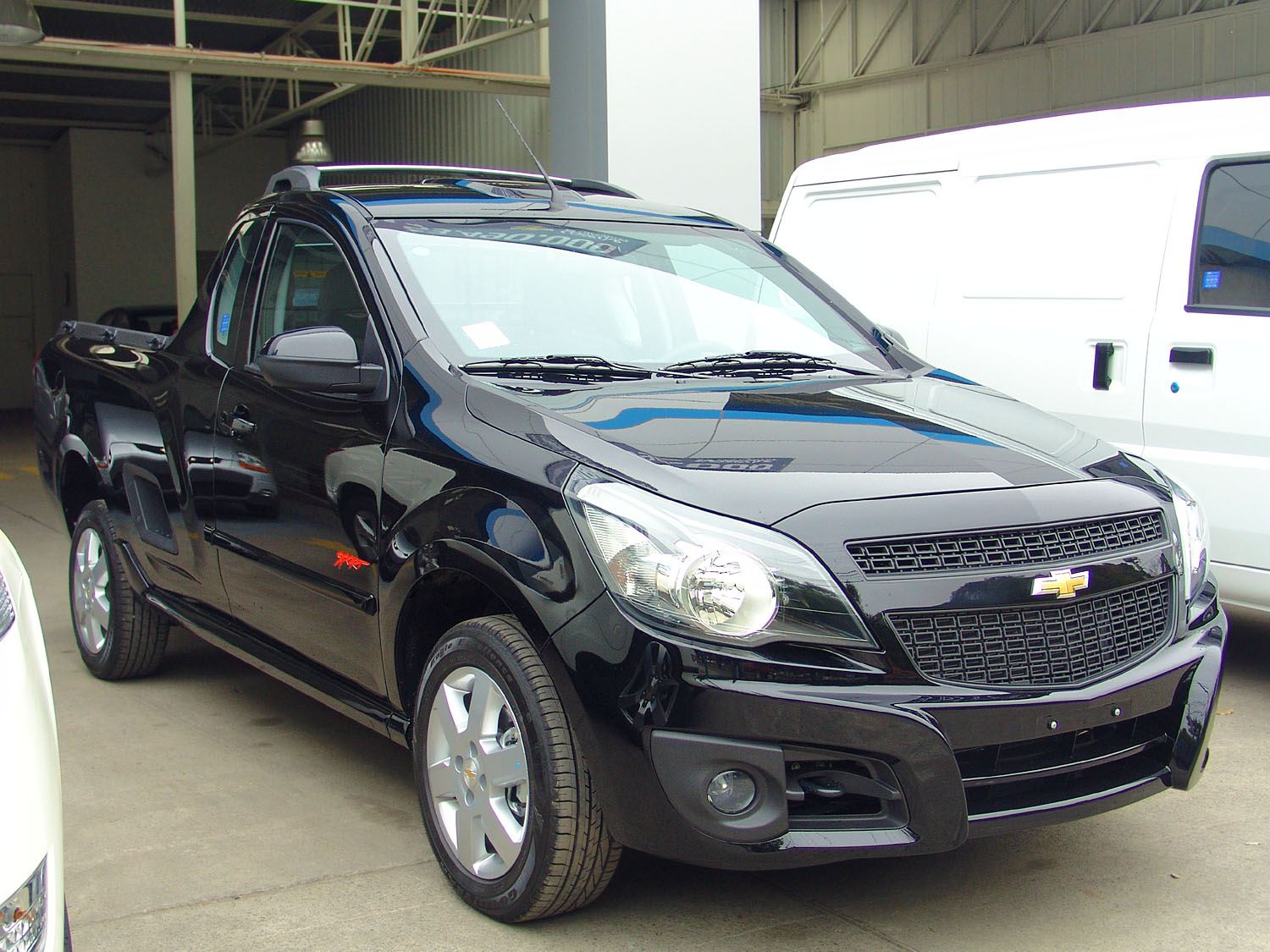
2011–2017 Chevrolet Montana

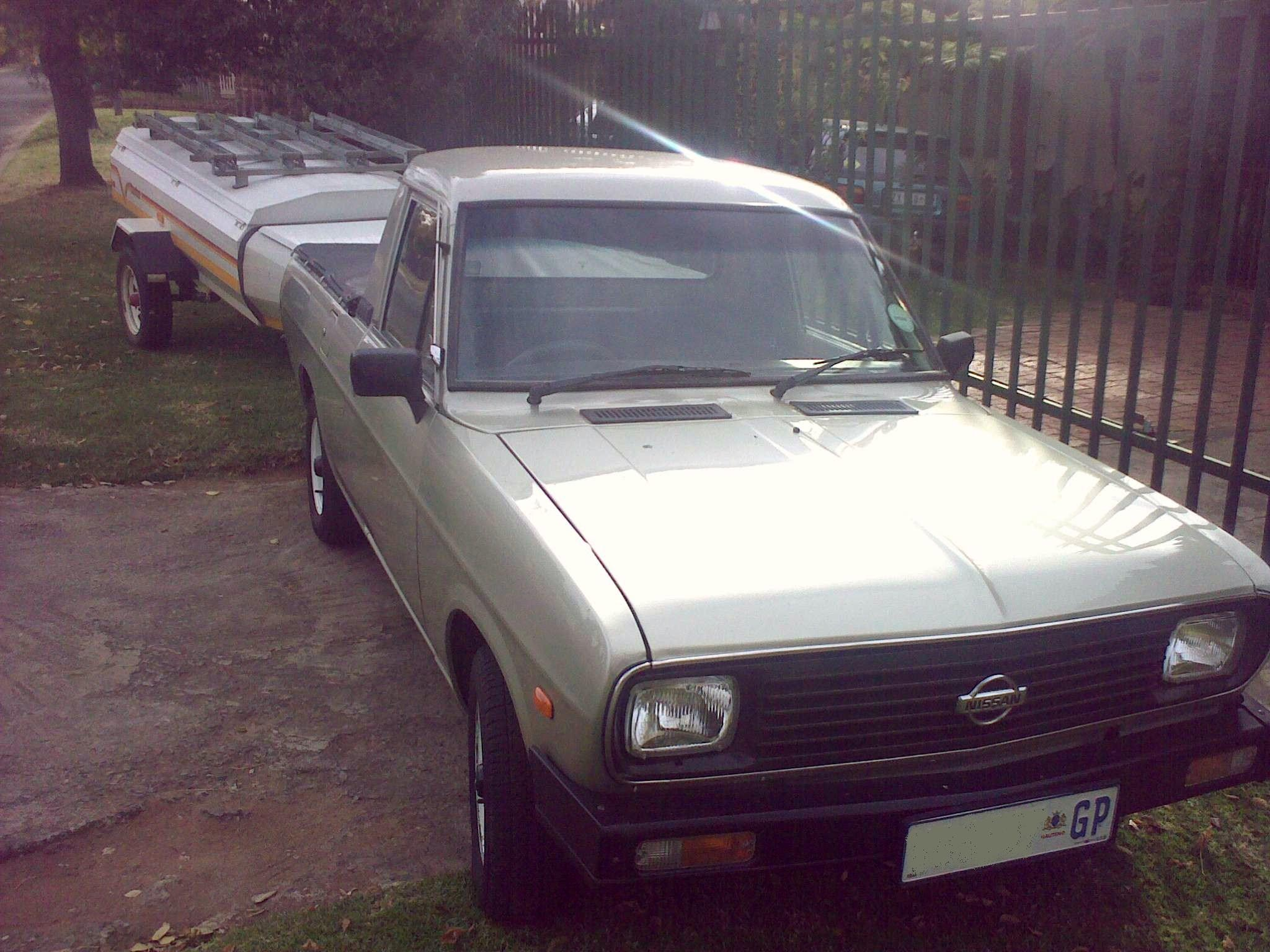
Nissan 1400 Bakkie, South Africa

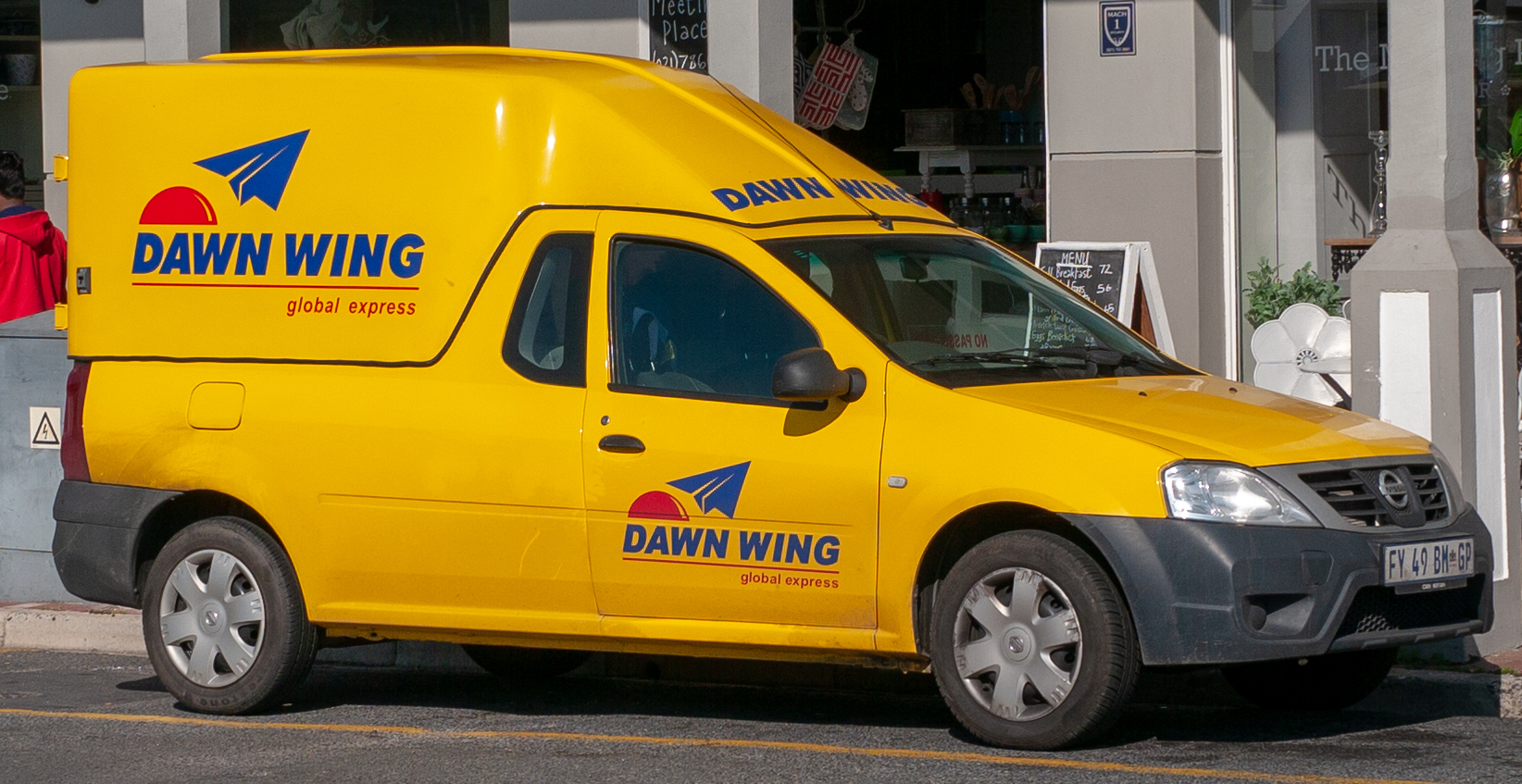
2008-2023 Nissan NP200 with a rear canopy, South Africa

== European models ==
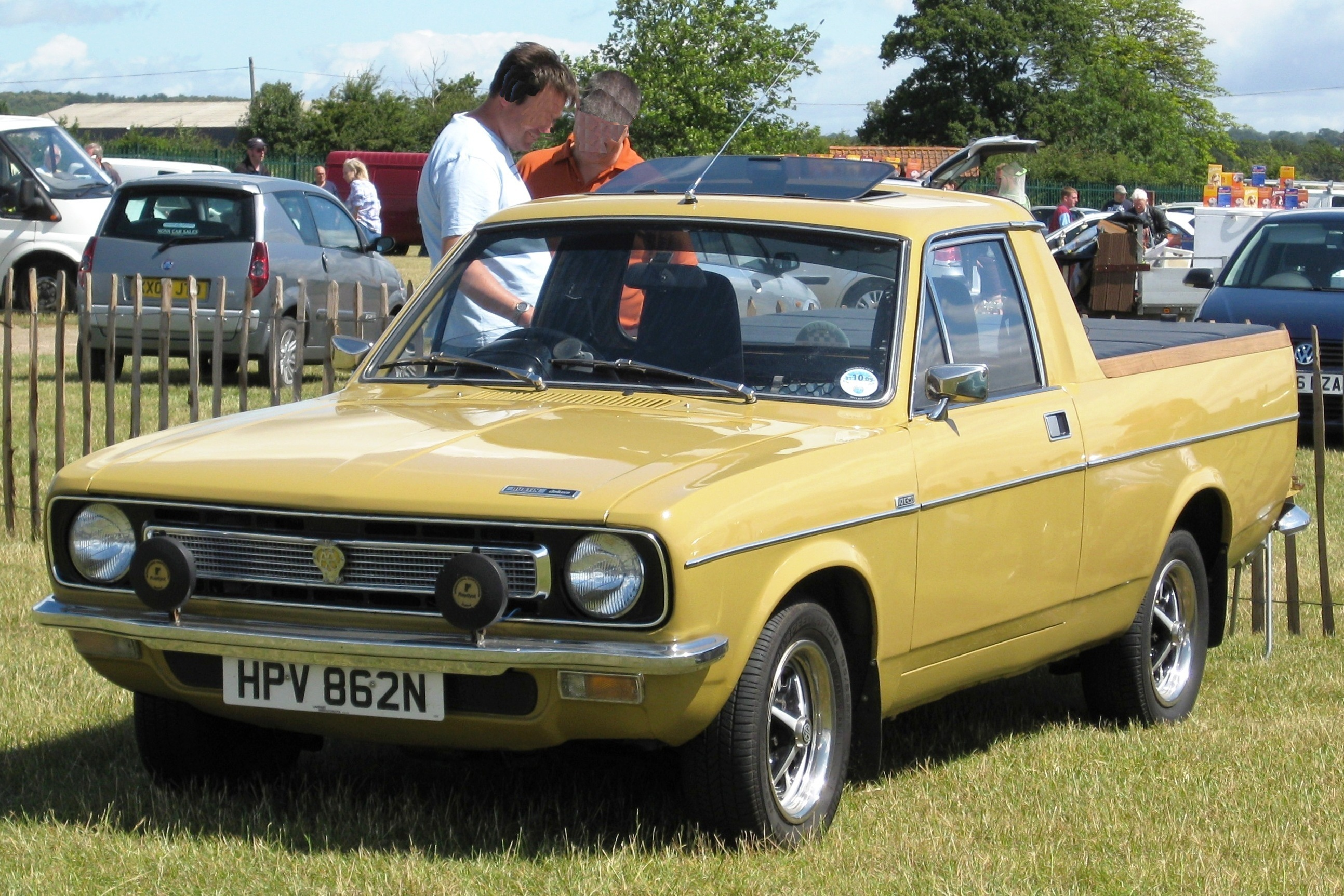
1975 Austin Marina truck

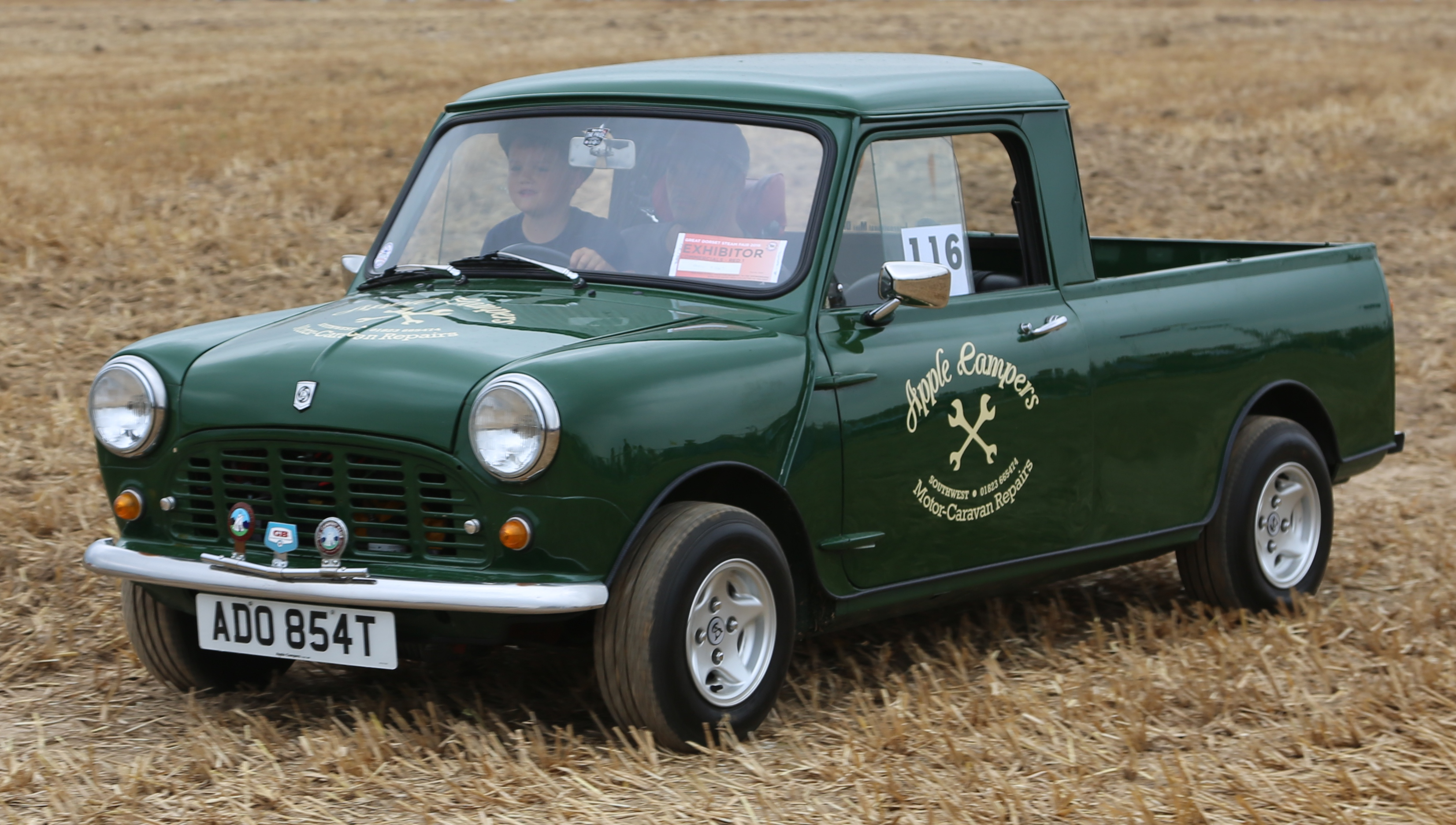
1972 Mini pick-up

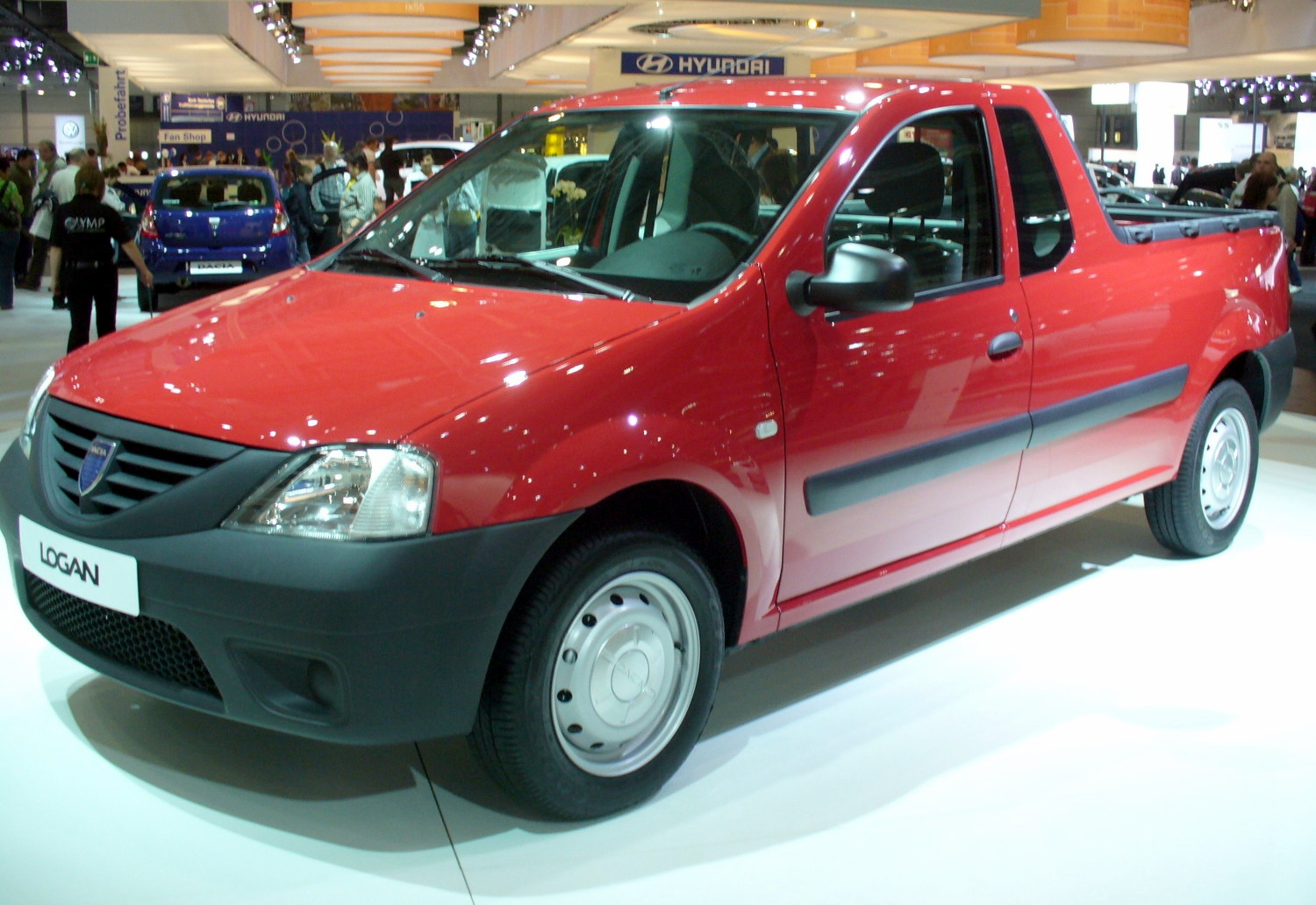
2009 Dacia Logan

Austin Marina A coupé utility, based on the 1971–1980 Morris Marina, with a 1275 cc engine, was badged as an Austin. Not many of them were sold.

Mini Variously badged pick-up variants were built on the chassis of the Mini estate/wagon.

Other European coupé utilities

- 1949–1952 Armstrong Siddeley Whitley 18 Utility Coupé
- 1949–1952 Armstrong Siddeley Whitley 18 Station Coupé (extended cab with a rear seat)
- 1956 Austin A35
- 1957–1973 Austin A55 Cambridge
- 1950–1954 Austin A70 Hereford
- Commer Light Pick-up (commercial variant of the Hillman Minx)
- 2007–2012 Dacia Logan Pick-Up
- 1975–2012 Dacia Logan/Logan II
- 1972–1982 Emelba 127 Poker
- 1977–2013 Fiat Fiorino
- 1988-2003 FSO Polonez pickup. In Italy, it was sold as the Daewoo Truck Plus.
- 1953-1973 Morris Minor
- 1974–2001 Moskvitch/IZh 27151
- 1955–1966 Peugeot 403
- 1979–1996 Peugeot 504
- 1975–1985 Simca 1100
- 1991–1995 Škoda Pick-up
- 1994–2001 Škoda Felicia Pickup/Fun
- 1954–1960 Standard 6 cwt utility (commercial variant of the Standard Ten)
- 1950–1964 Standard Vanguard utility (also sold as "Standard Pick-up Truck")
- 1979–2007 Volkswagen Caddy Typ 14/Rabbit coupé utility
- 1996–2001 Volkswagen Caddy Typ 9U (rebadged Škoda Felicia coupé utility)
- c. 1952 Singer SM1500
- 1966–1991 Wartburg 353 "Trans"
- 1971–1993 Ford P100
- 1990–1994 ZAZ-968MP Zaporozhets

== Australian models ==
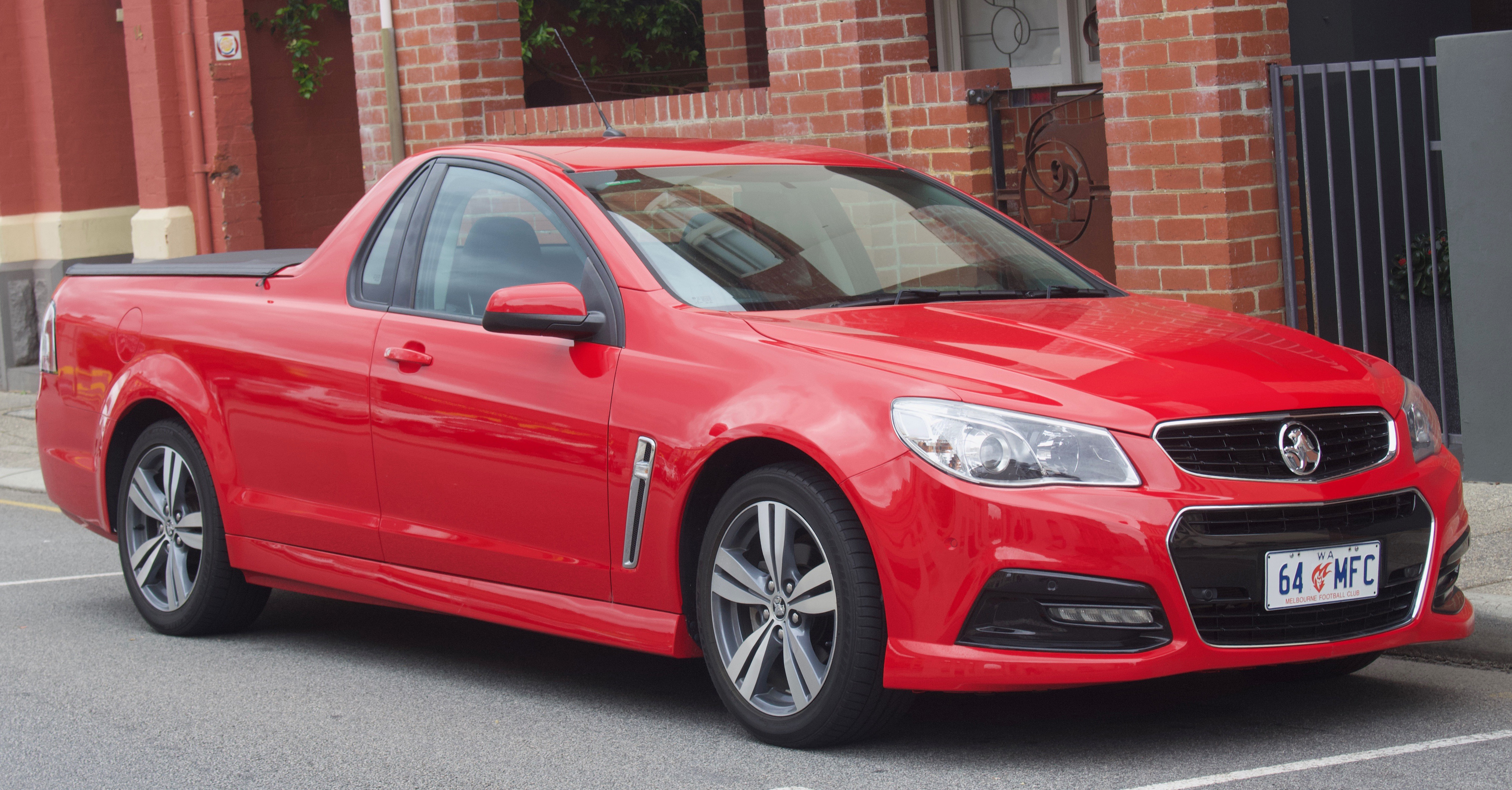
2014 Holden VF Commodore Ute

Coupe utilities have been produced in Australia since the 1930s. The three major Australian manufacturers (GM-Holden, Ford and Chrysler) offered coupe utility versions of their most popular models, and many of the smaller manufacturers also offered coupe utilities in their range. In many cases, if a coupe utility was not available as part of the regular model range an aftermarket coachbuilder would build one to customer order. Coupe utilities were also offered by various manufacturers on light truck style chassis, alongside their regular style pickup and cab-chassis offerings.

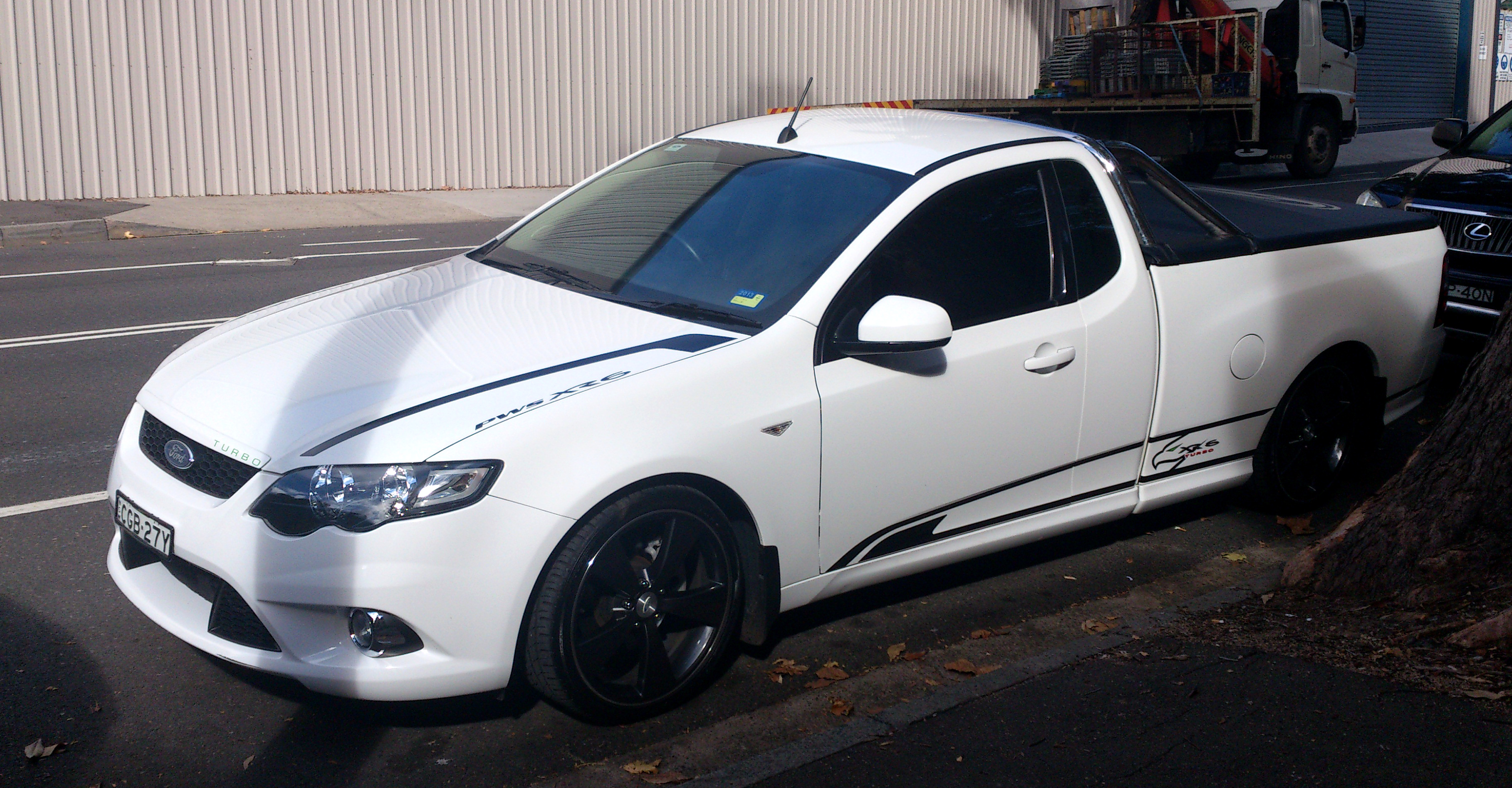
Ford Falcon XR6 Ute

Examples include:

Ford

- 1934–1940 Ford coupe utility
- 1941–1948 Ford
- 1949–1951 Ford
- 1946–1953 Ford Anglia A54A (1946–48) and Anglia A494A (1949–53)
- 1956–1962 Ford Consul Mark II and Ford Zephyr Mark II
- 1960–1999 Ford Falcon (from 1999 to 2016 the Falcon utility had a separate pick up bed and was therefore no longer strictly a coupe utility)
- 1952–1959 Ford Mainline
- 1949–1951 Ford Pilot
- 1953–1955 Ford Popular 103E
- 1939–1953 Ford Prefect E93A/E03A (1939–45), Prefect A53A (1946–48) and Prefect A493A (1948–53)
- 1937–1938 Ford Ten 6 cwt coupe utility
- 1946–1958 Mercury Club Coupe Utility
- 1989–1991 Nissan Ute (badge engineered version of the Ford Falcon (XF) utility)

General Motors-Holden

- From 1934 various GM chassis were available fitted with coupe utility bodywork
- Bedford HC 6 cwt Carryall (commercial variant of the Vauxhall 10-4)
- 1946–1948 Chevrolet Stylemaster
- 1949–1952 Chevrolet Styleline
- 1951–1968 Holden
- 1990–2017 Holden Commodore/Holden Ute (models from 2000 to 2017 were marketed as Holden Utes not Commodores)
- 1968–1984 Belmont/Kingswood
- 1952–1954 Vauxhall Wyvern E series and 1952–1957 Velox E Series

Chrysler

- From 1935, various Dodge, Plymouth and Fargo chassis were available fitted with coupe utility bodywork
- 1958–1961 Chrysler Wayfarer
- 1965–1971 Chrysler Valiant/Valiant Wayfarer
- 1971–1978 Chrysler Valiant
- 1956–1957 DeSoto Diplomat
- 1966–1976 Dodge (lower spec version of the Valiant/Wayfarer utility)
- 1956–1957 Dodge Kingsway
- 1956–1957 Plymouth Cranbrook/Savoy/Belvedere

BMC

- Austin A40 Devon (Several unique variants were offered on the Australian market, including the Austin A40 Panelside and the A40 Hi-Lite)
- 1956 Austin A50
- Austin A55 Cambridge
- 1968–1971 Austin 1800

Standard

- Morris Eight Series II, Series E and Series Z
- Standard Vanguard
- Triumph Mayflower

Rootes Group

- 1939 Hillman Fourteen
- 1956 Hillman deluxe utility based on Mark VIII Hillman Minx

Lightburn

- Zeta utility
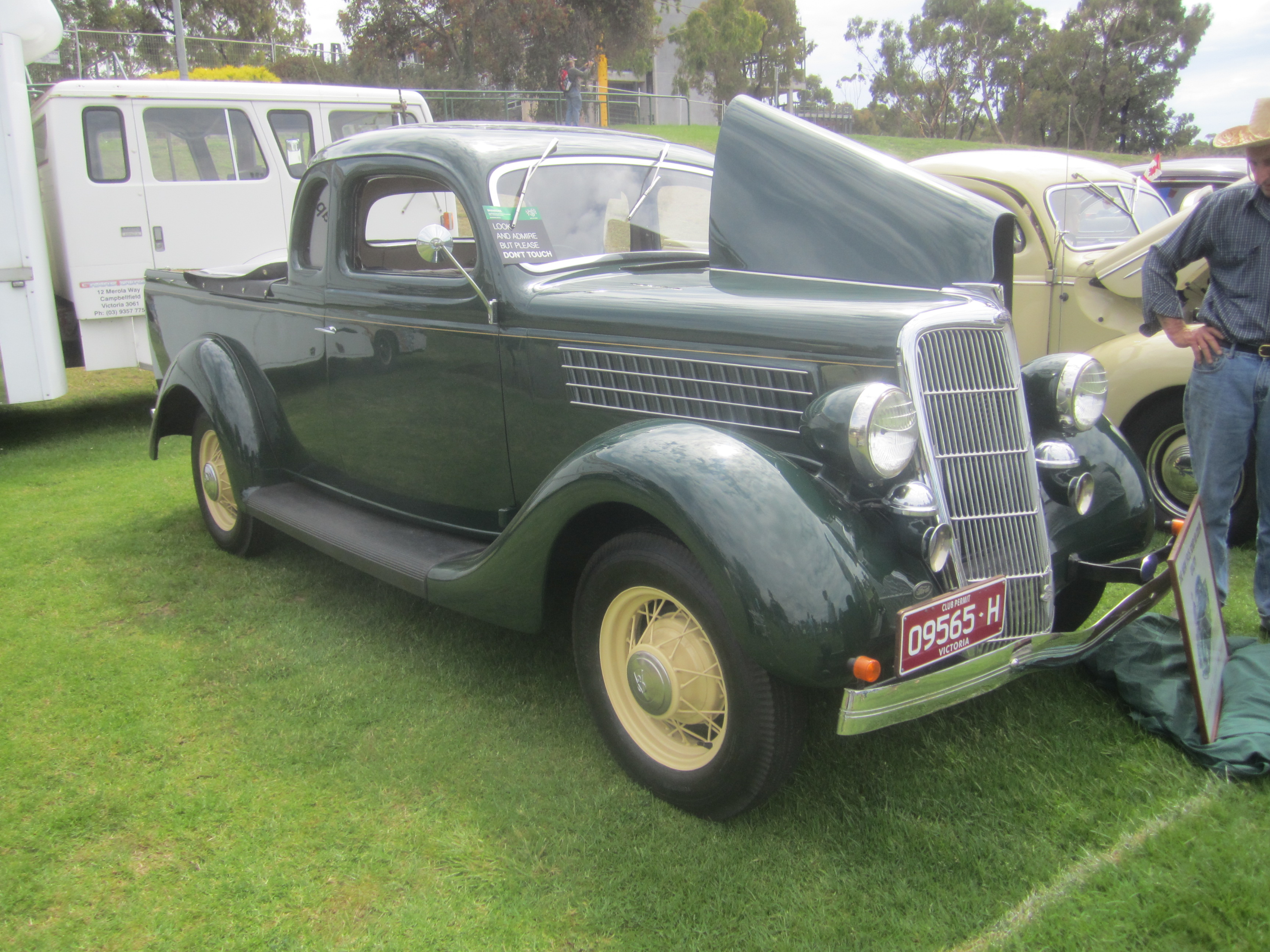
1935 Ford Model 48 coupe utility

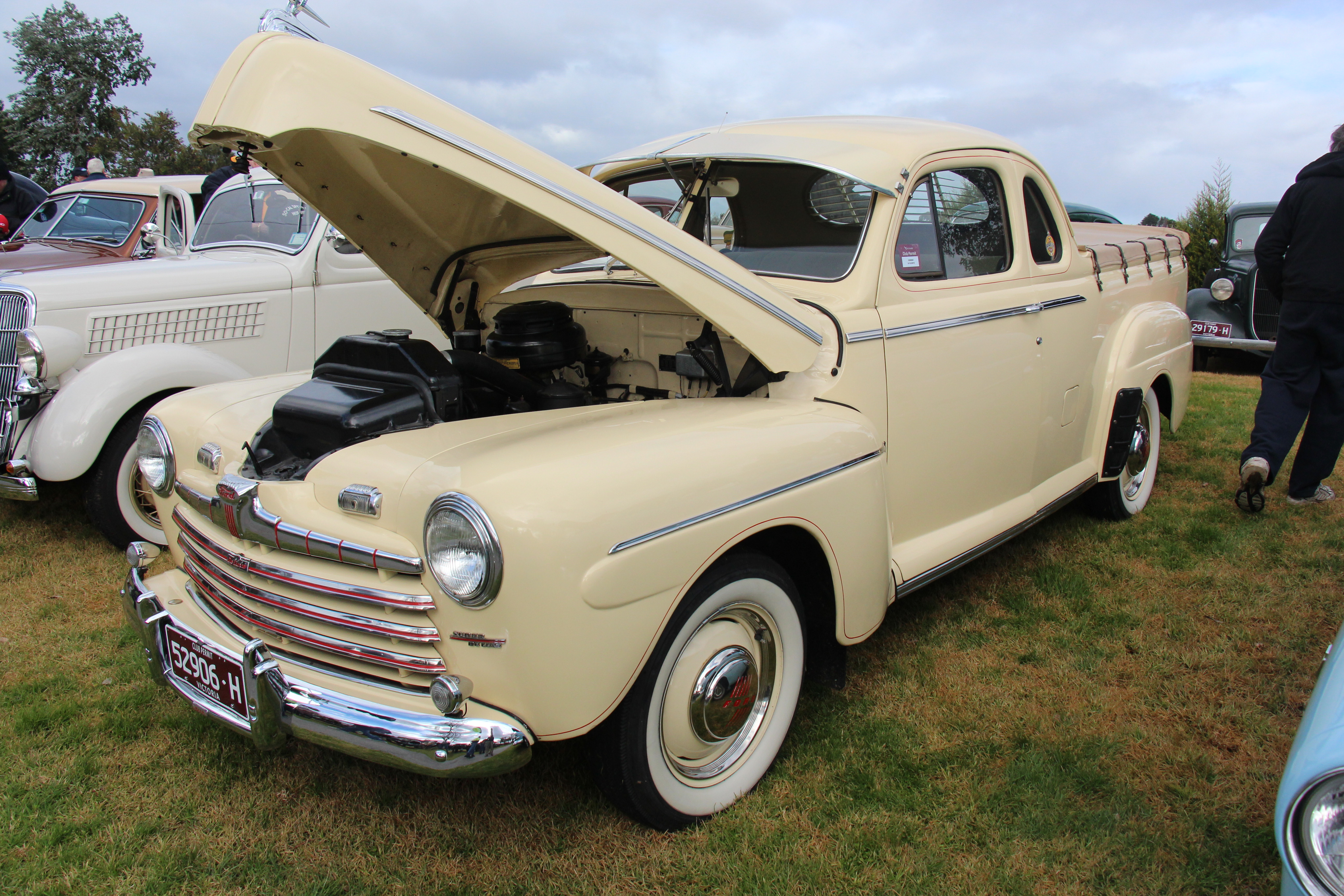
1946 Ford Super Deluxe utility

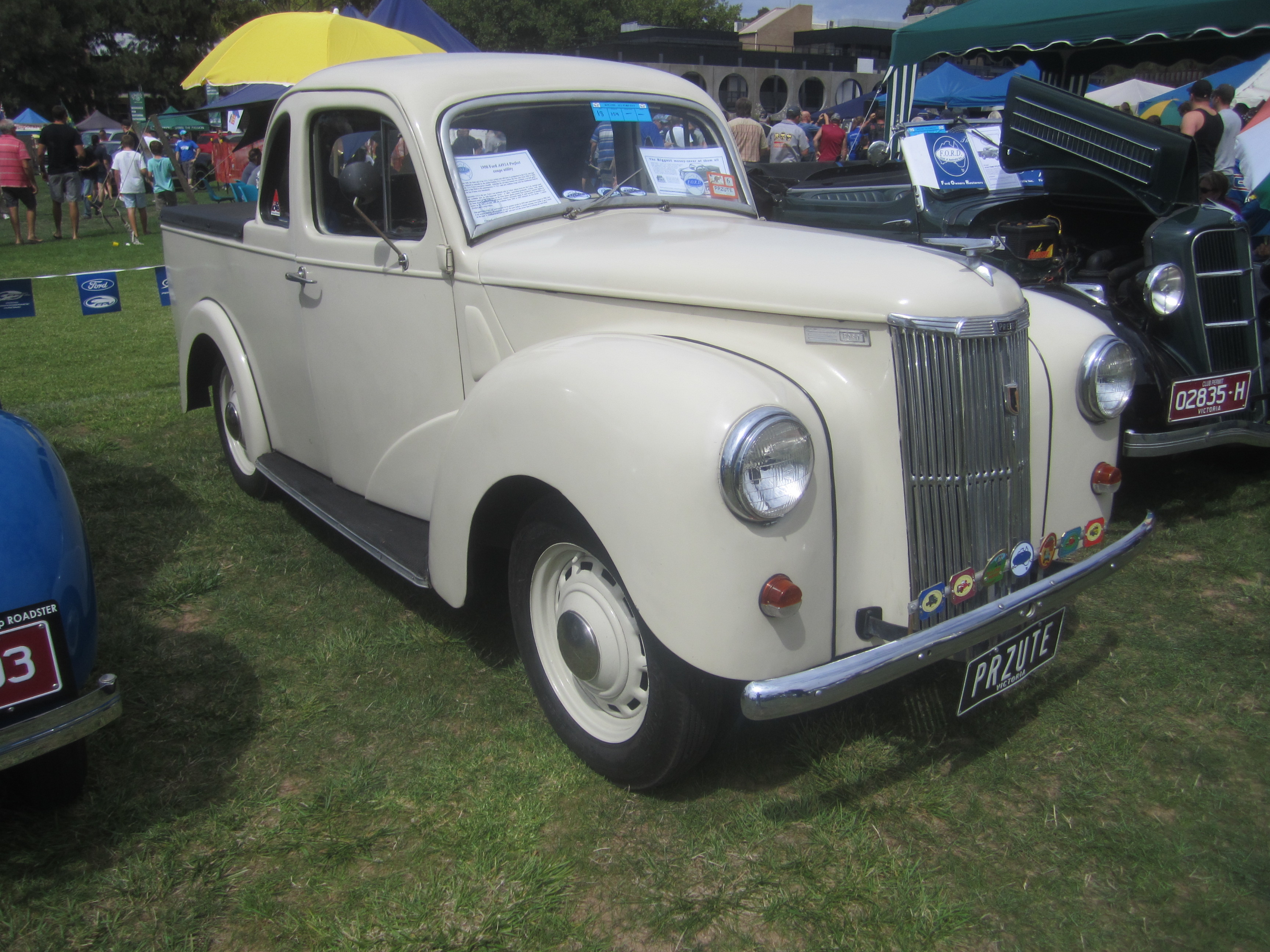
1950 Ford Prefect utility

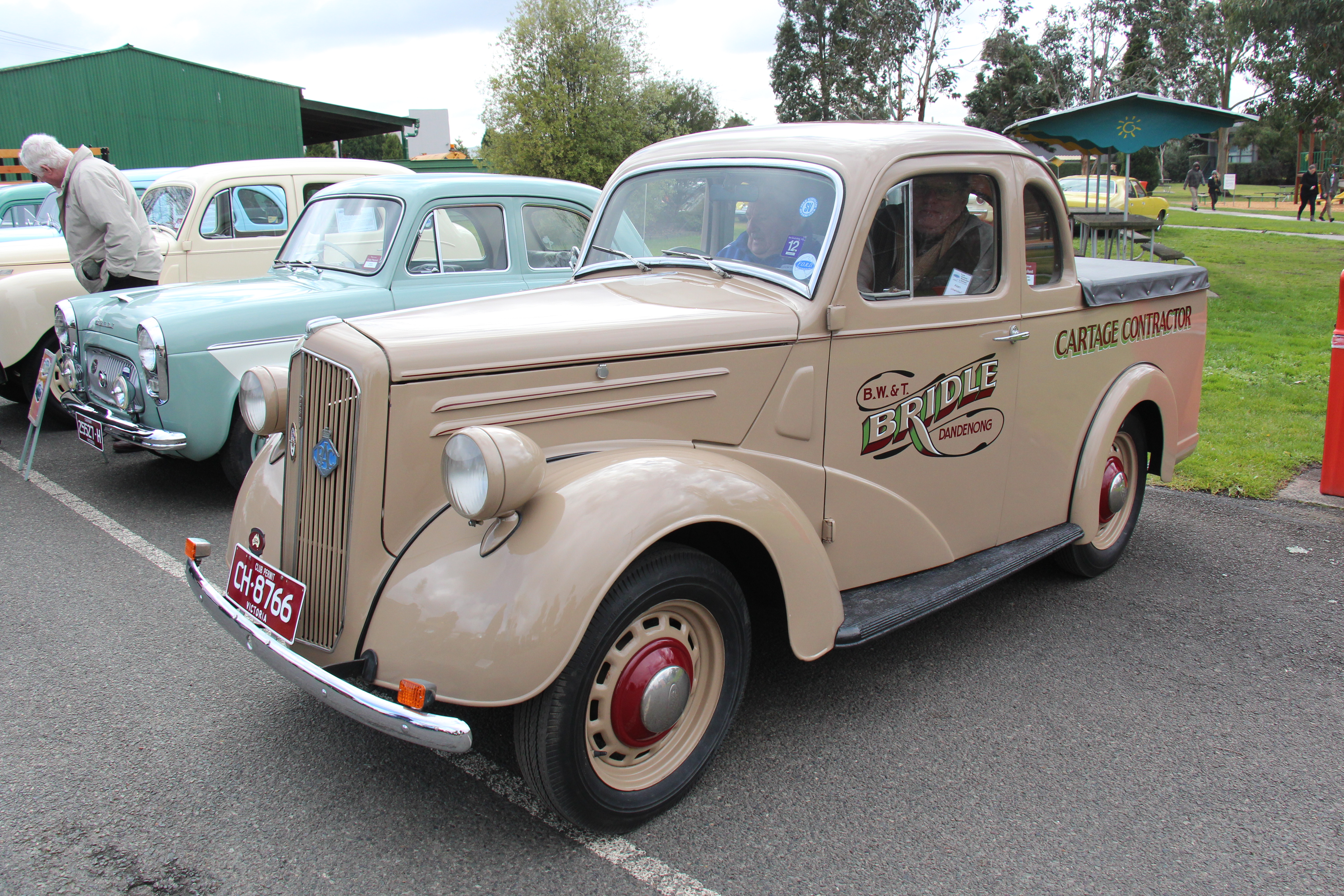
1947 Ford Anglia utility

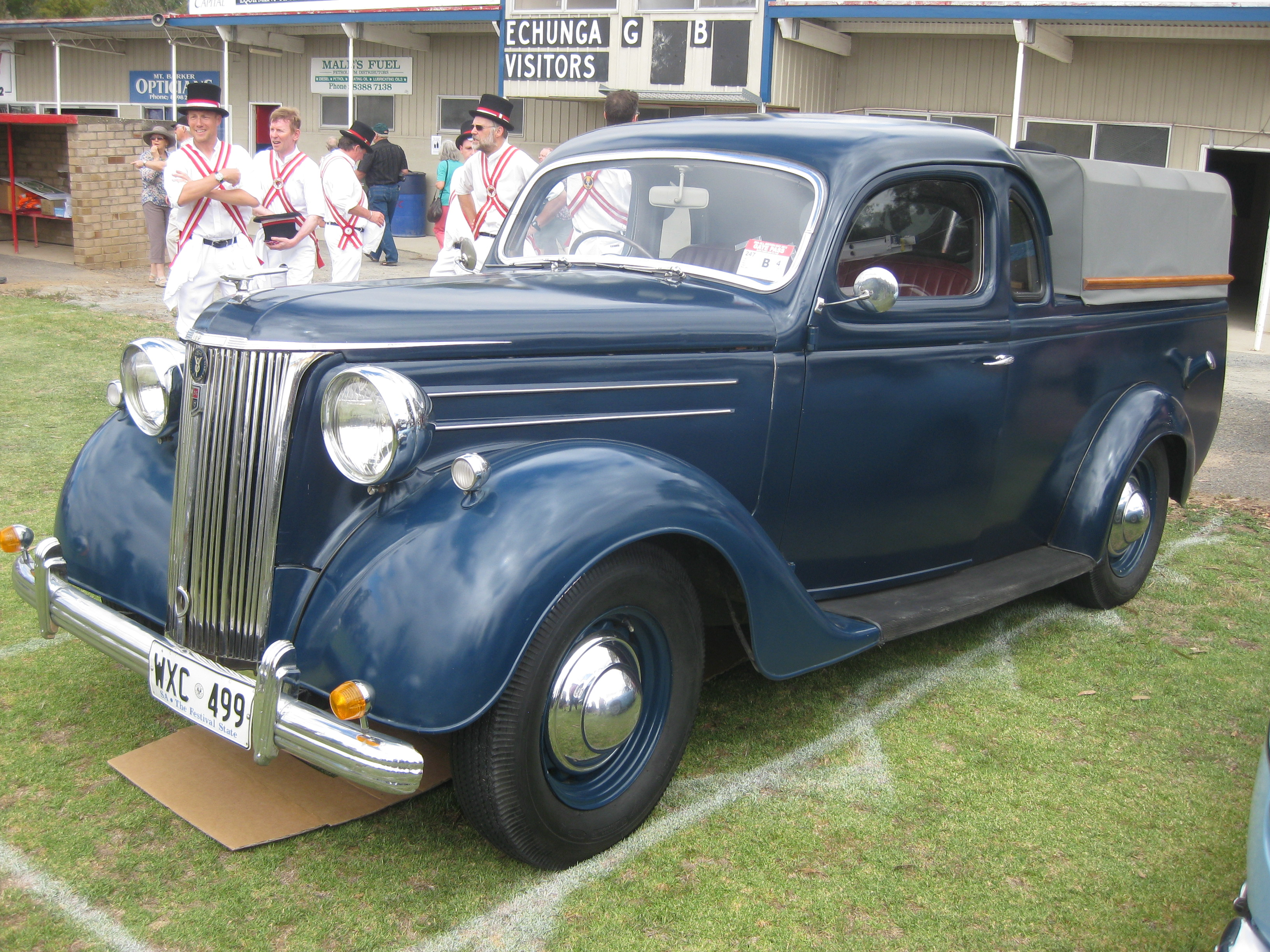
Ford Pilot utility

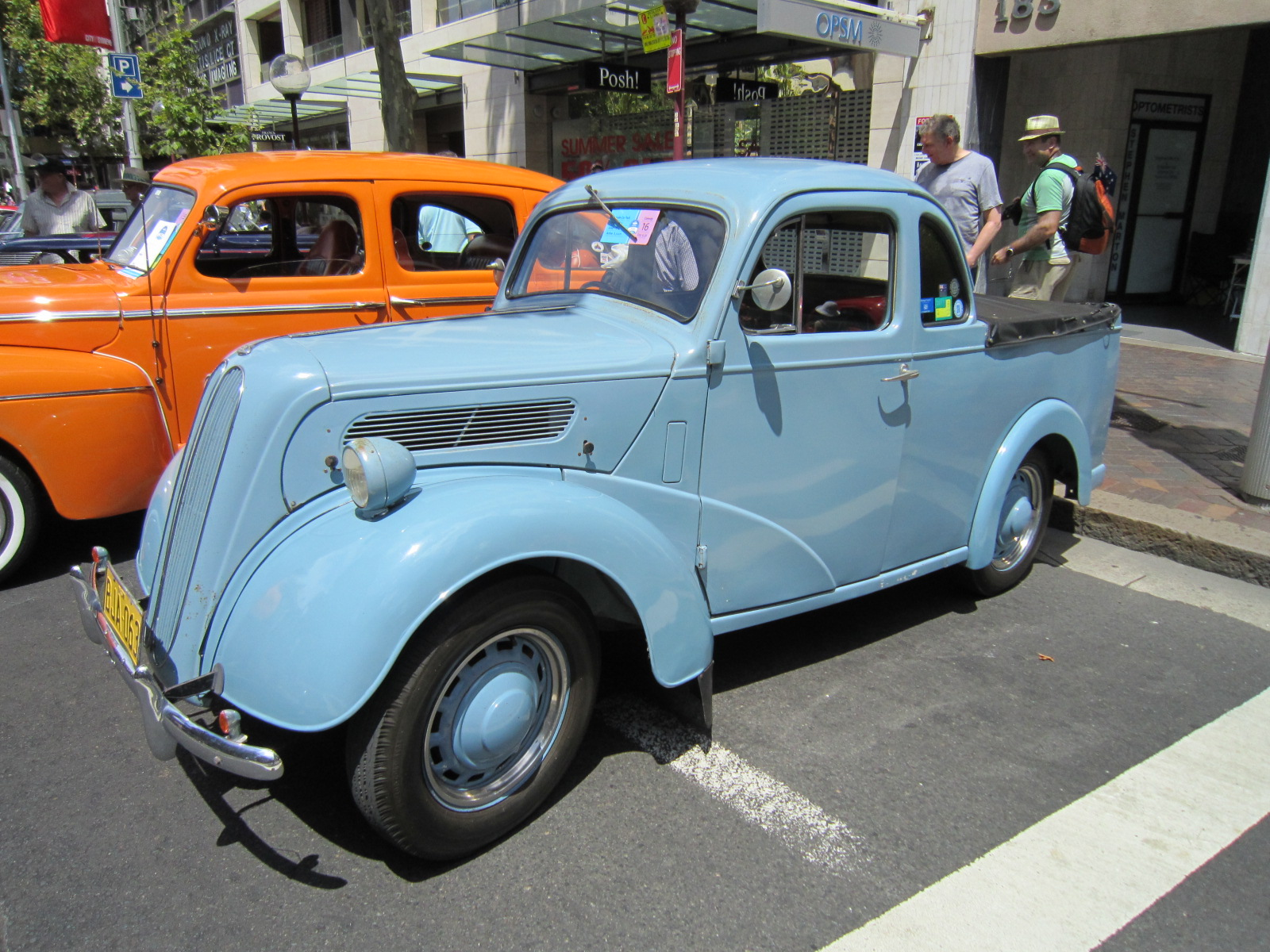
Ford Popular utility

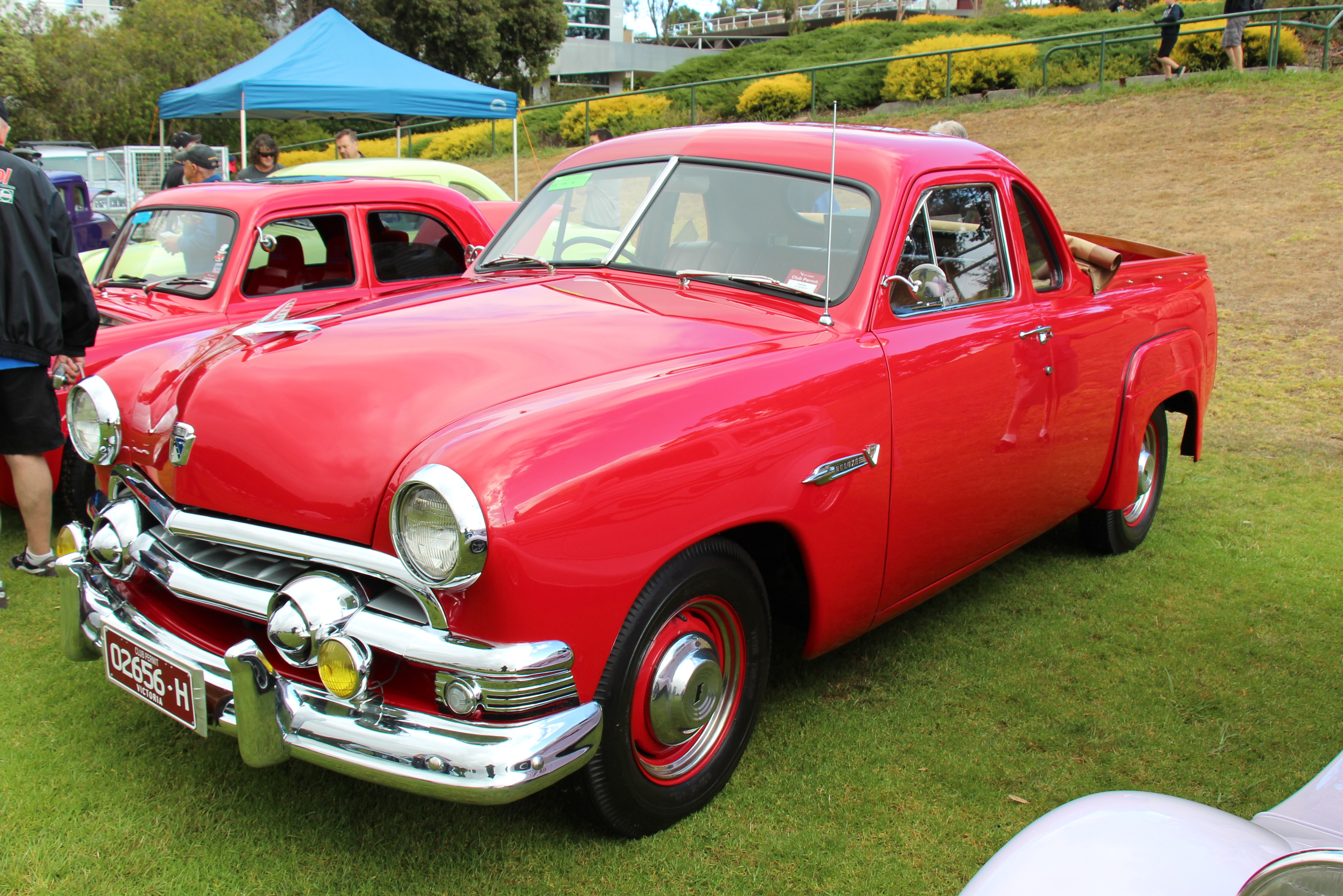
1951 Ford utility

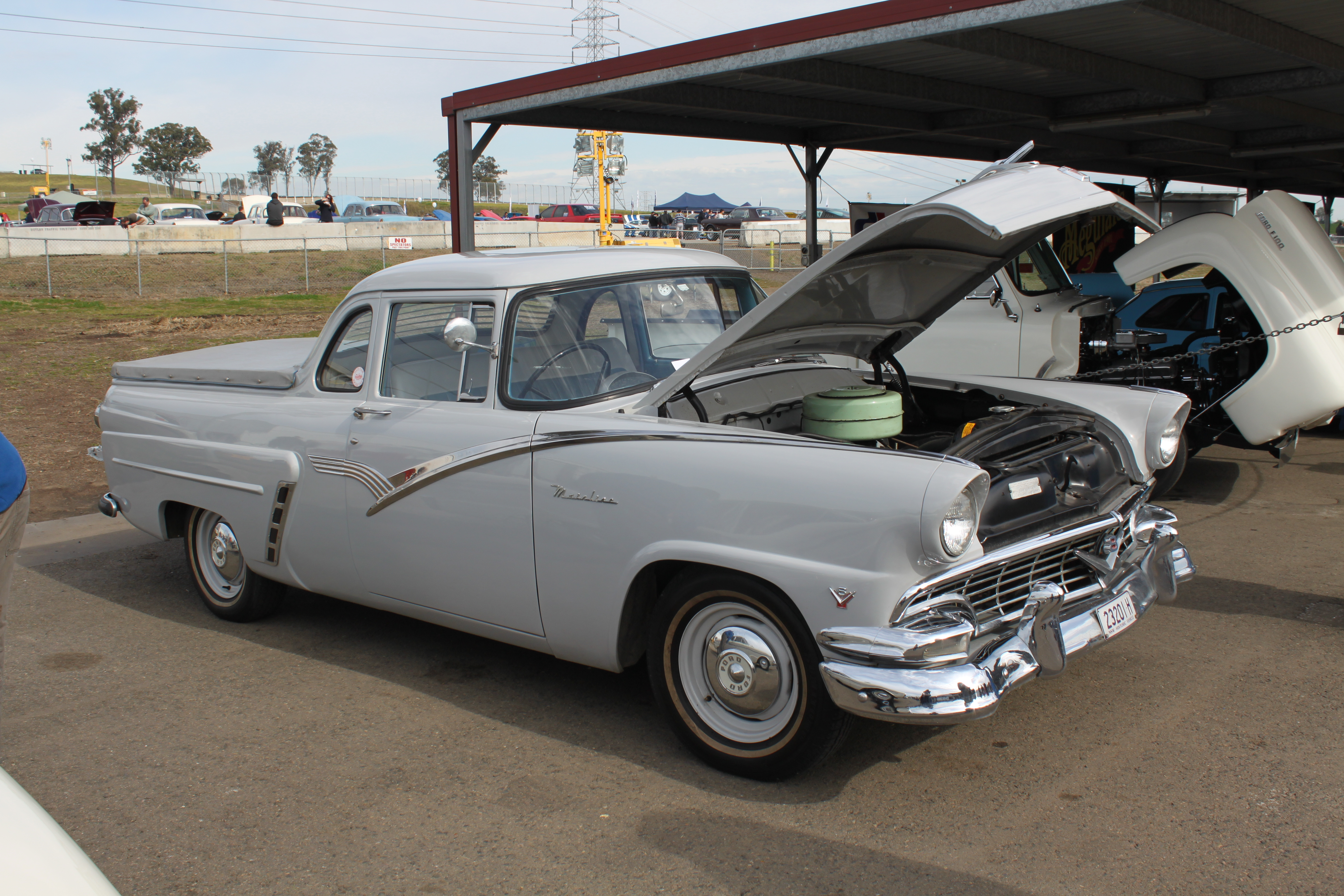
1957 Ford Mainline utility

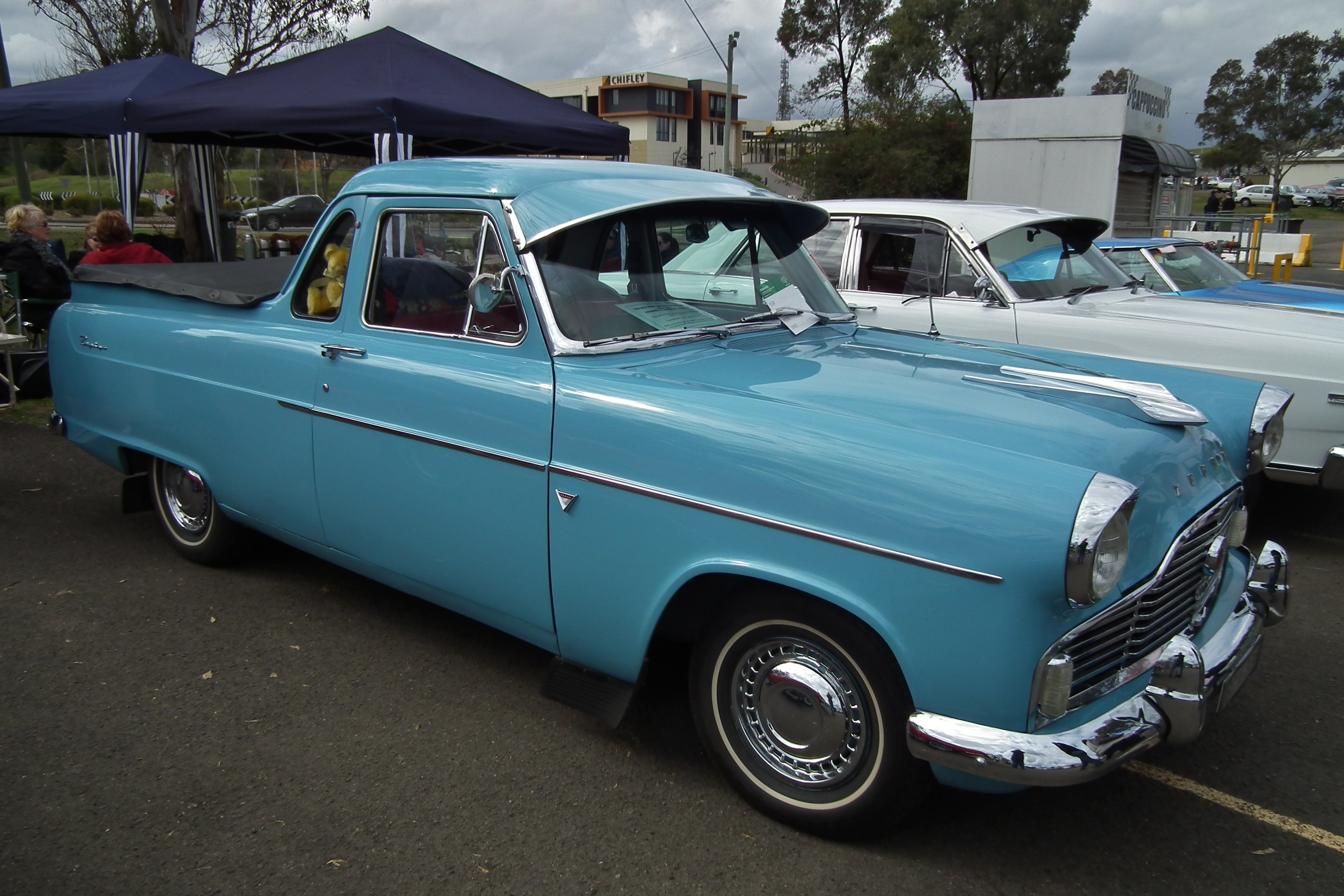
1960 Ford Zephyr Mk II utility

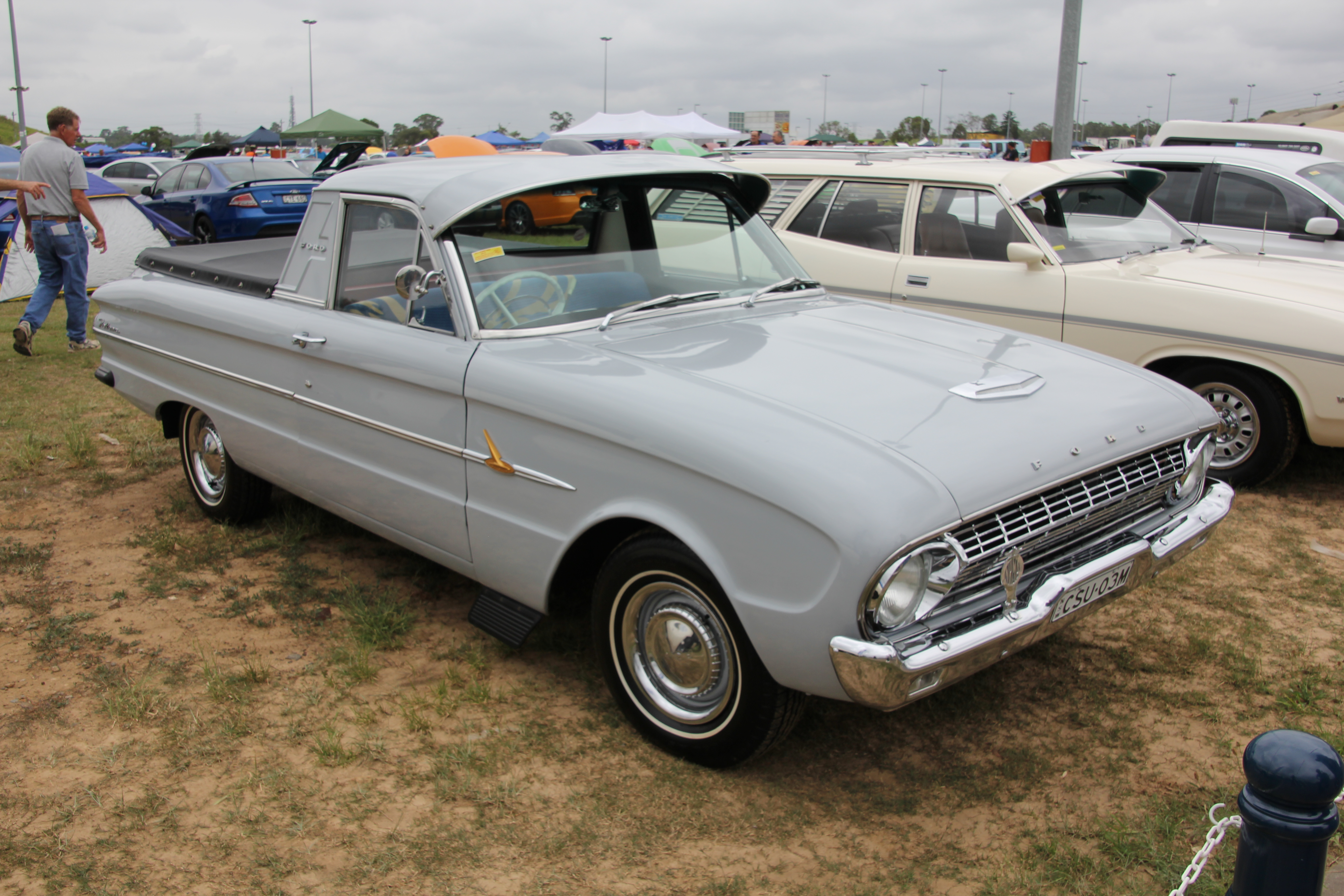
1962 Ford XL Falcon Deluxe utility

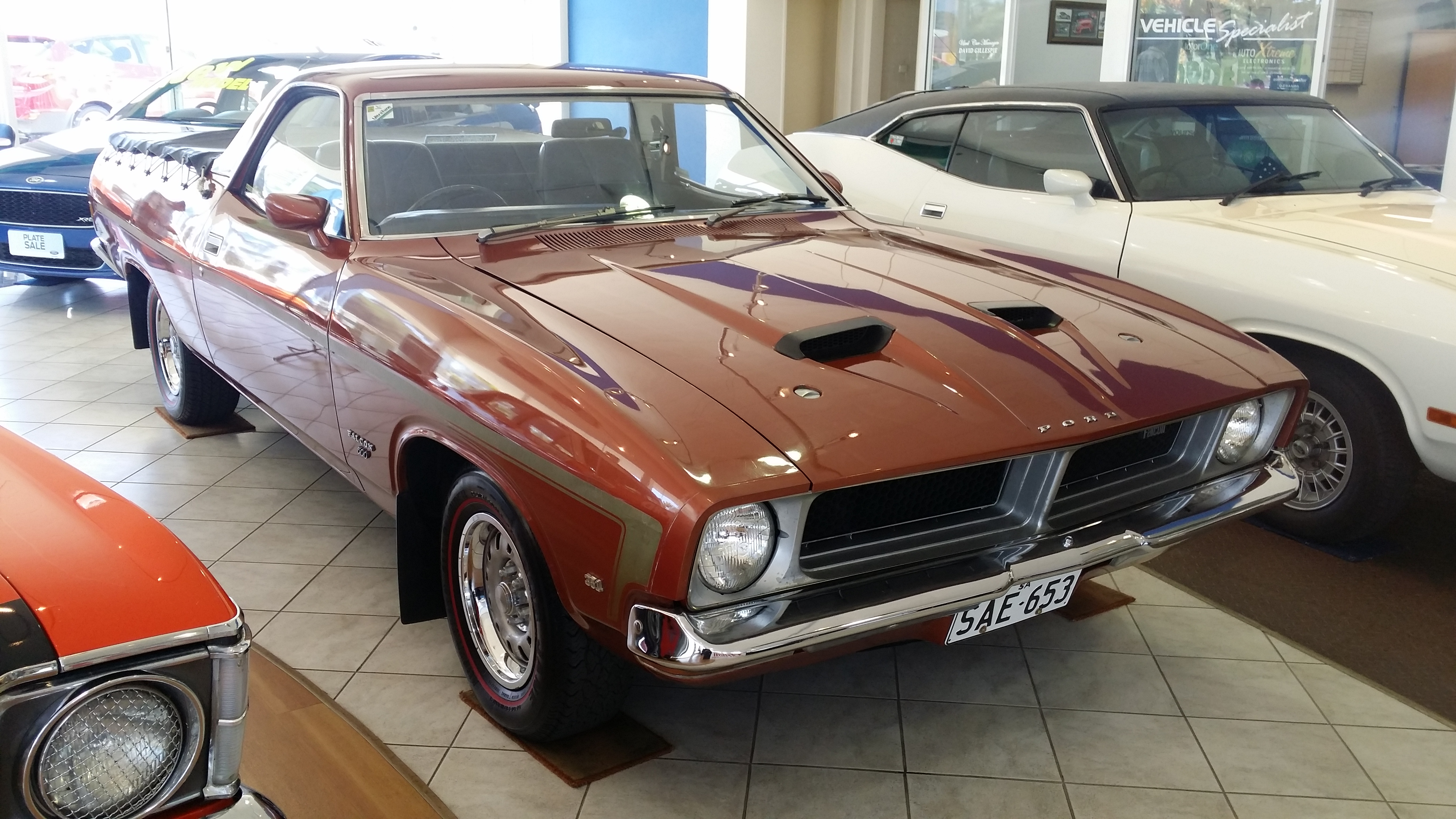
Ford XB Falcon utility

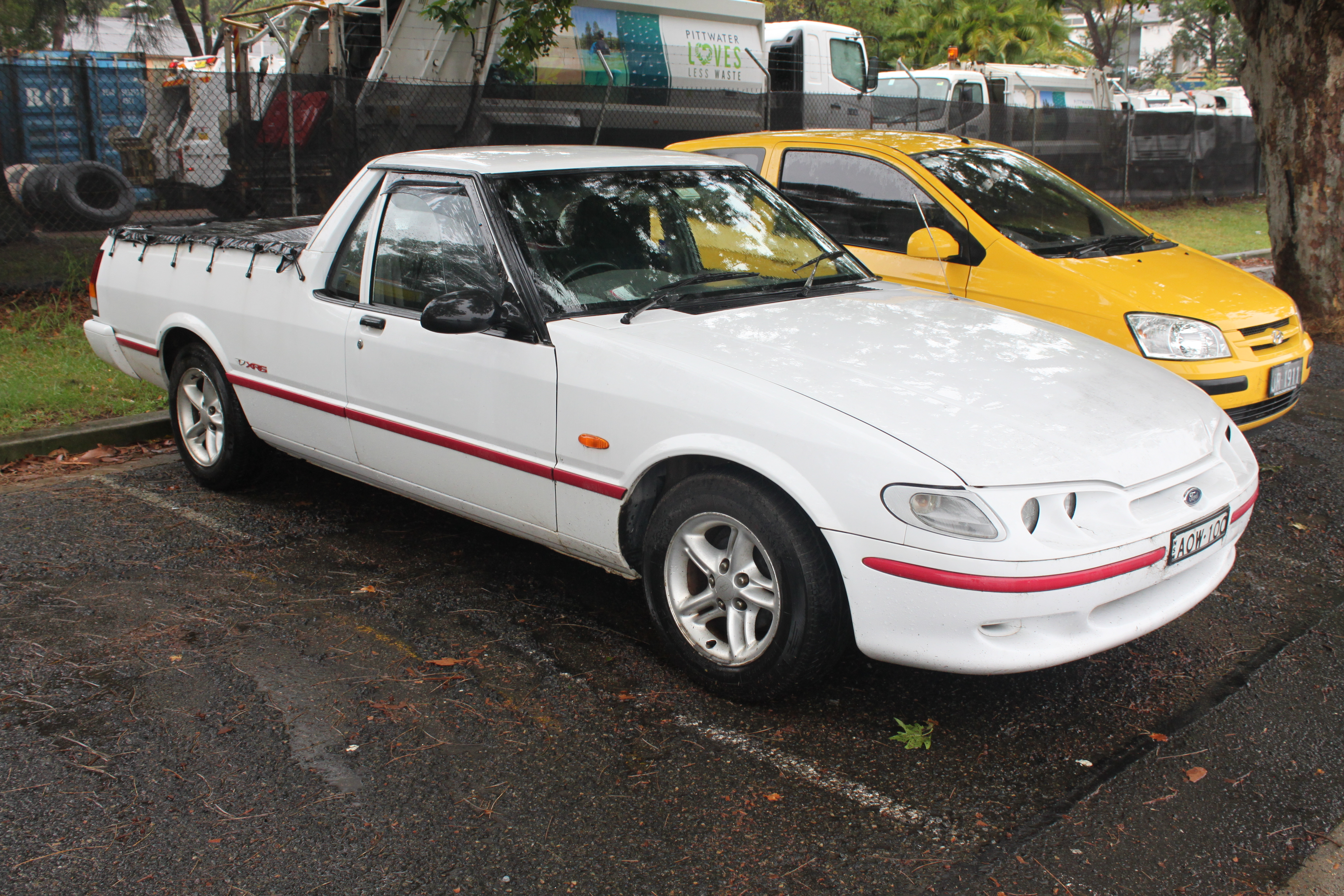
1999 Ford XH II Falcon utility

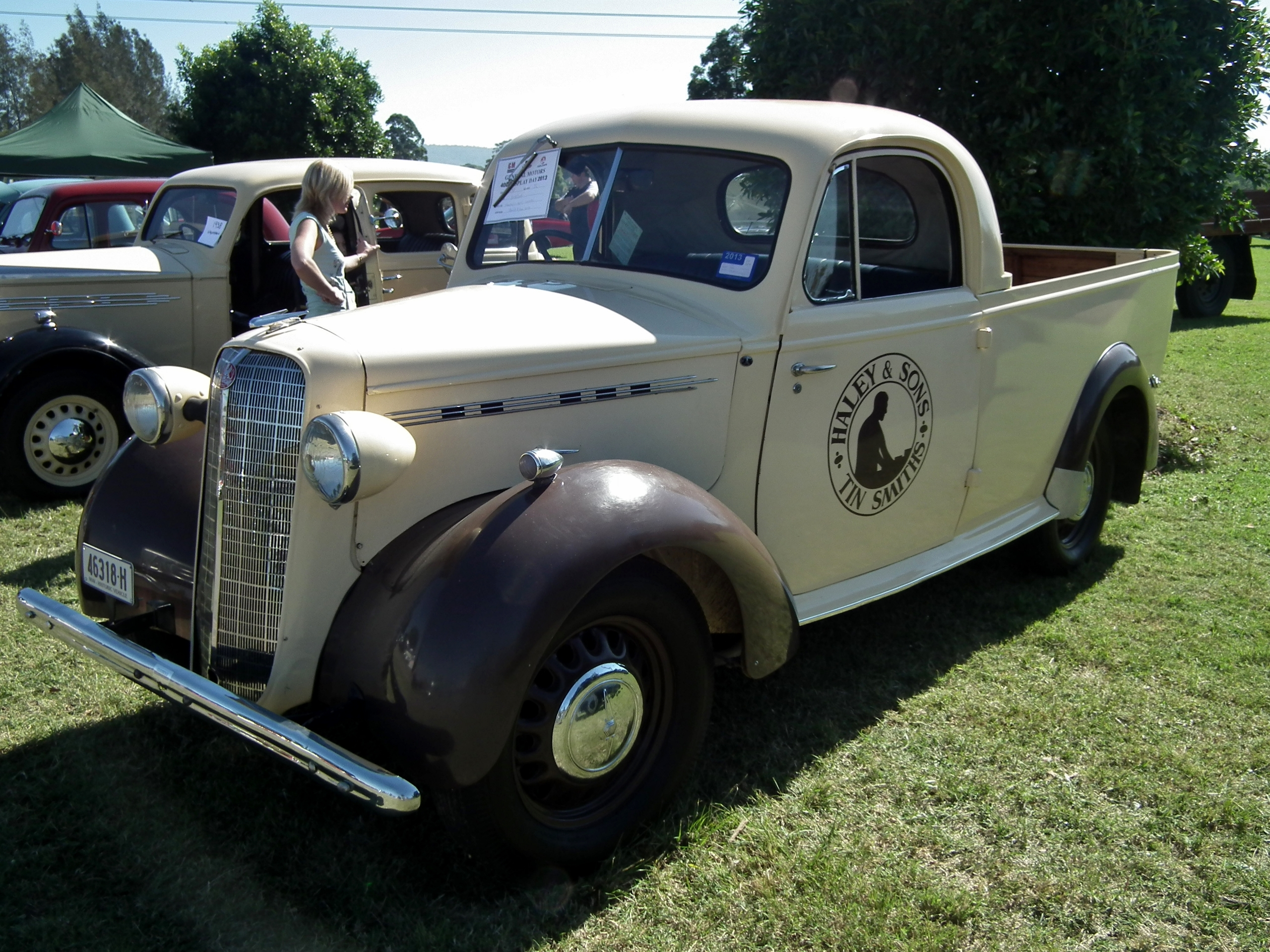
1940 Bedford JC coupe utility

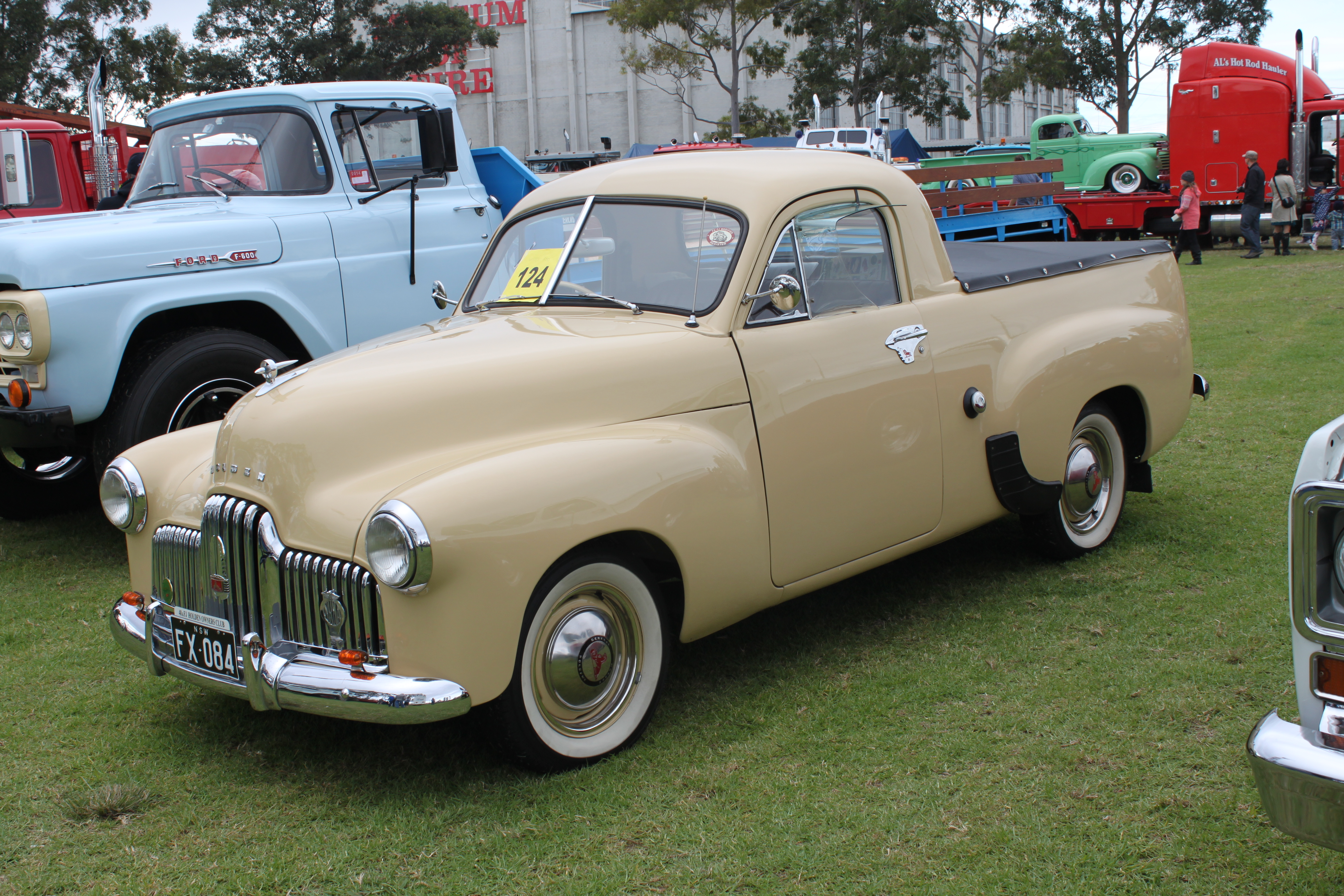
Holden 50-2016 utility

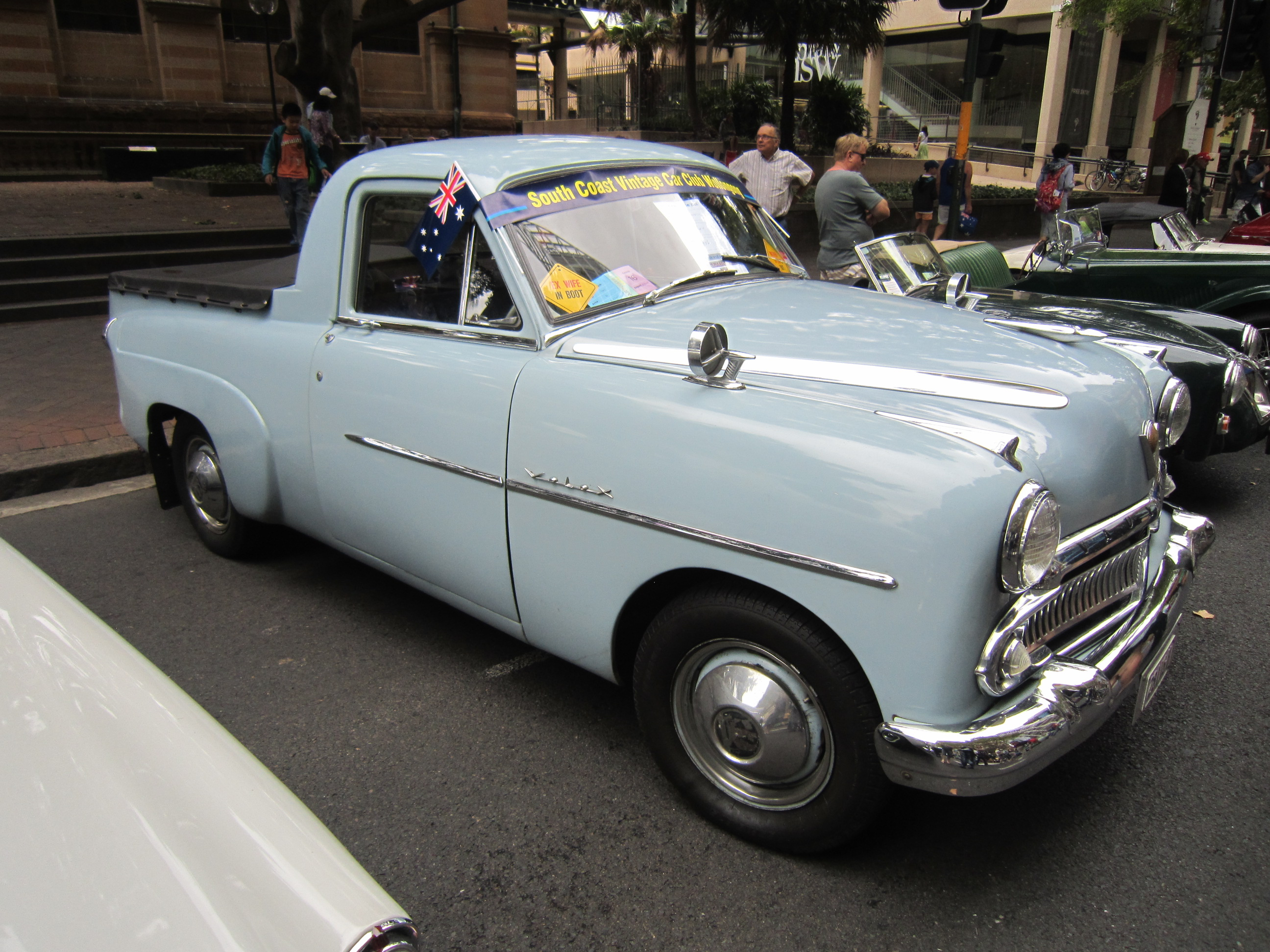
Vauxhall Velox utility

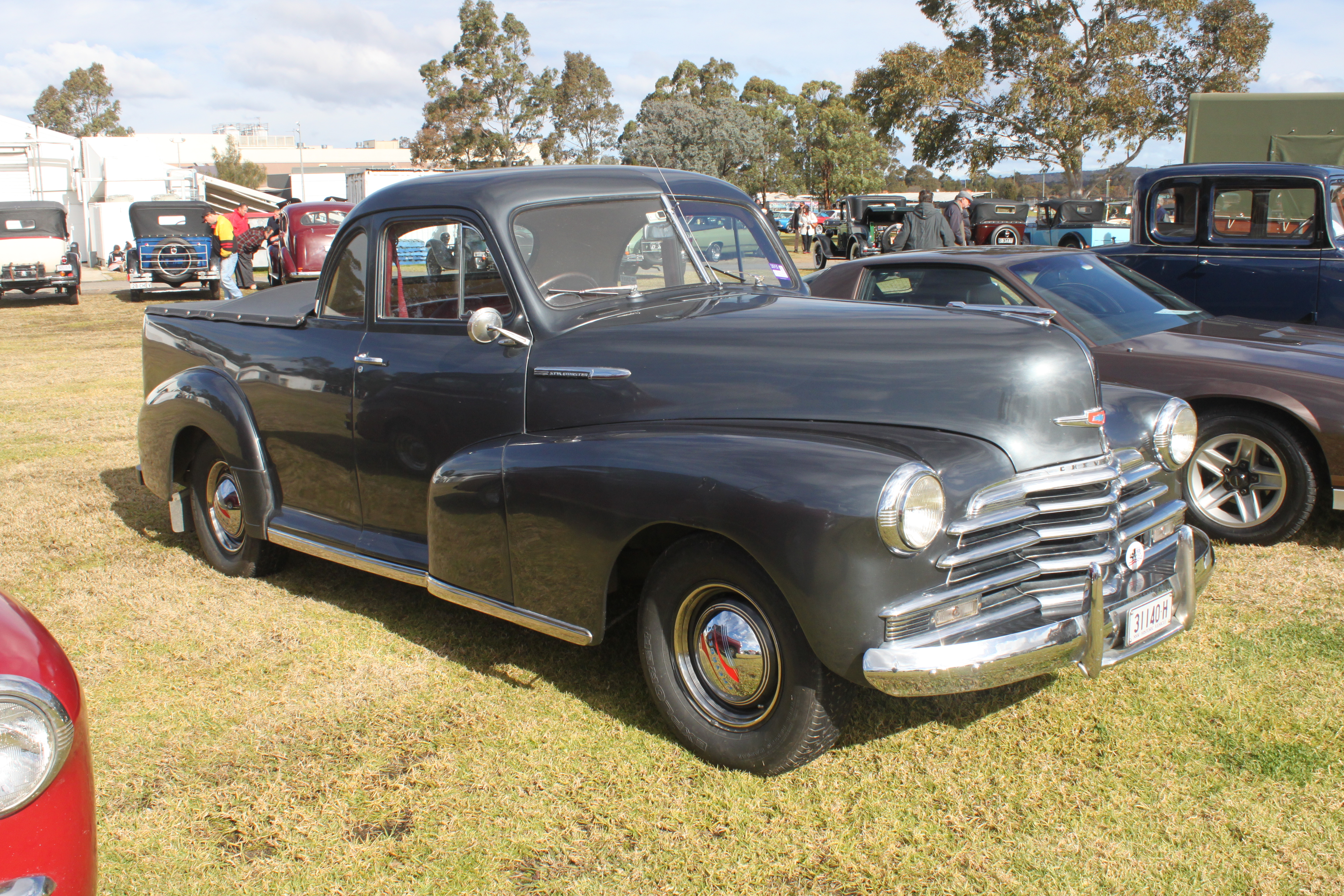
1947 Chevrolet Stylemaster utility

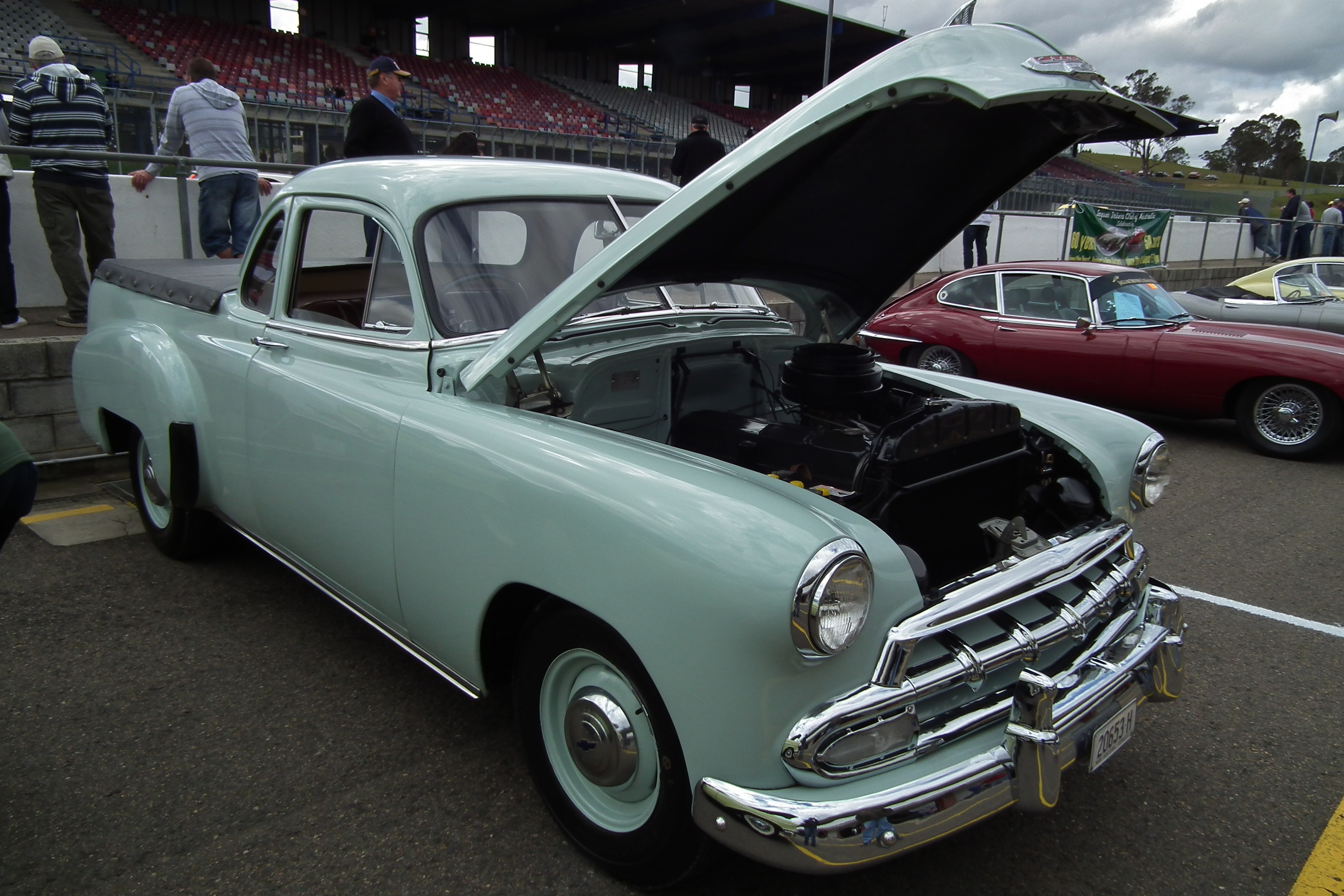
1952 Chevrolet Styleline utility

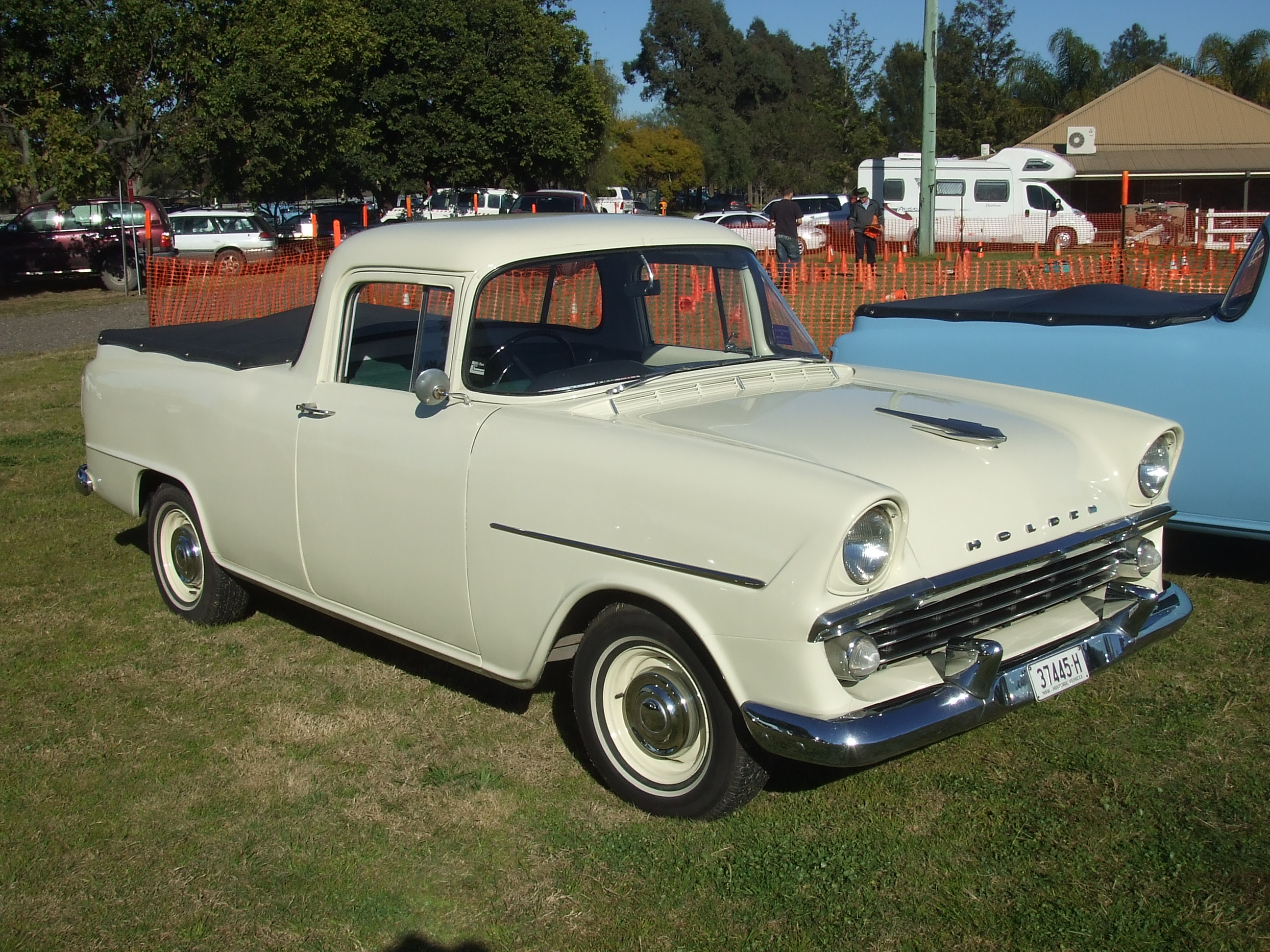
Holden FB utility

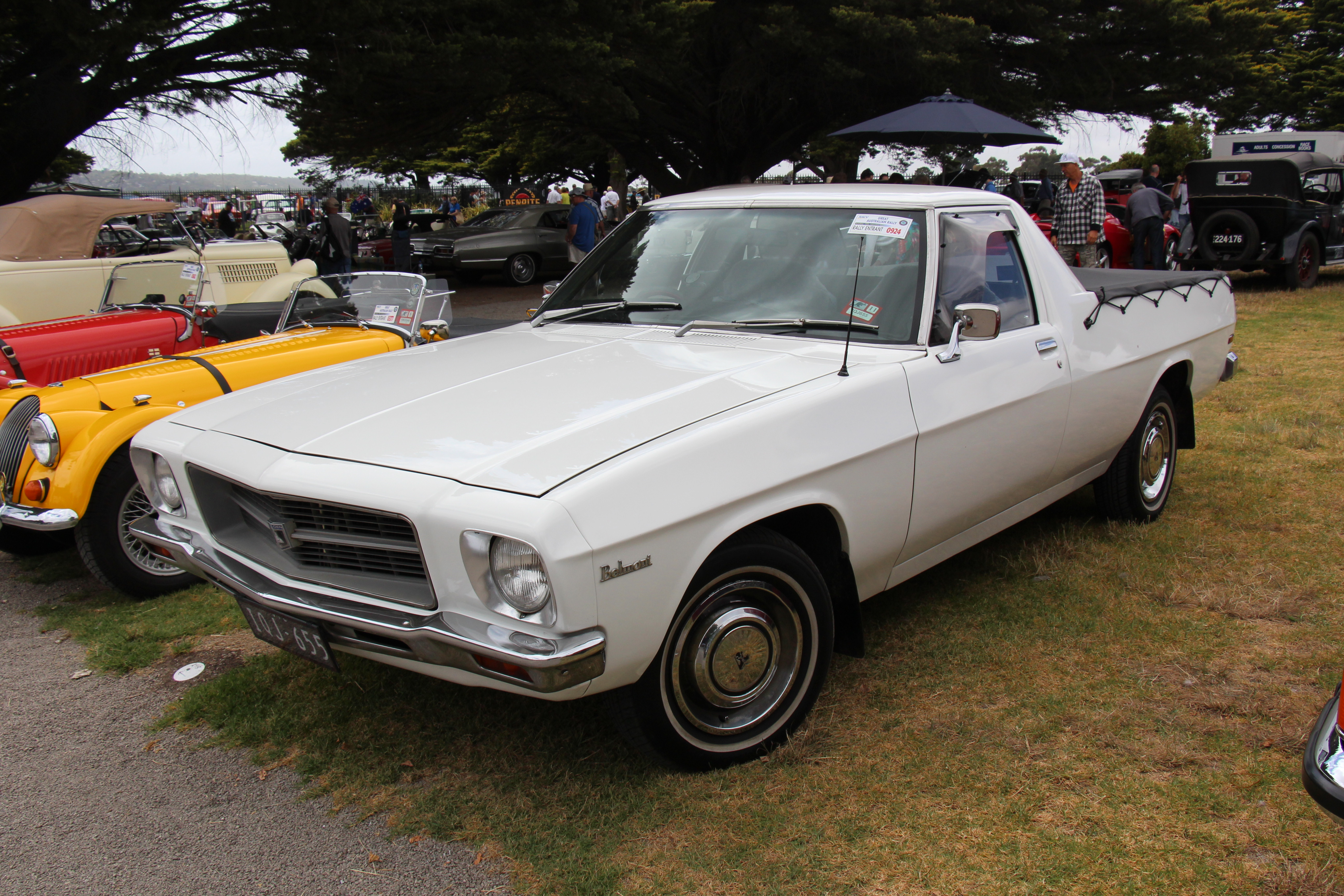
Holden HQ Belmont utility

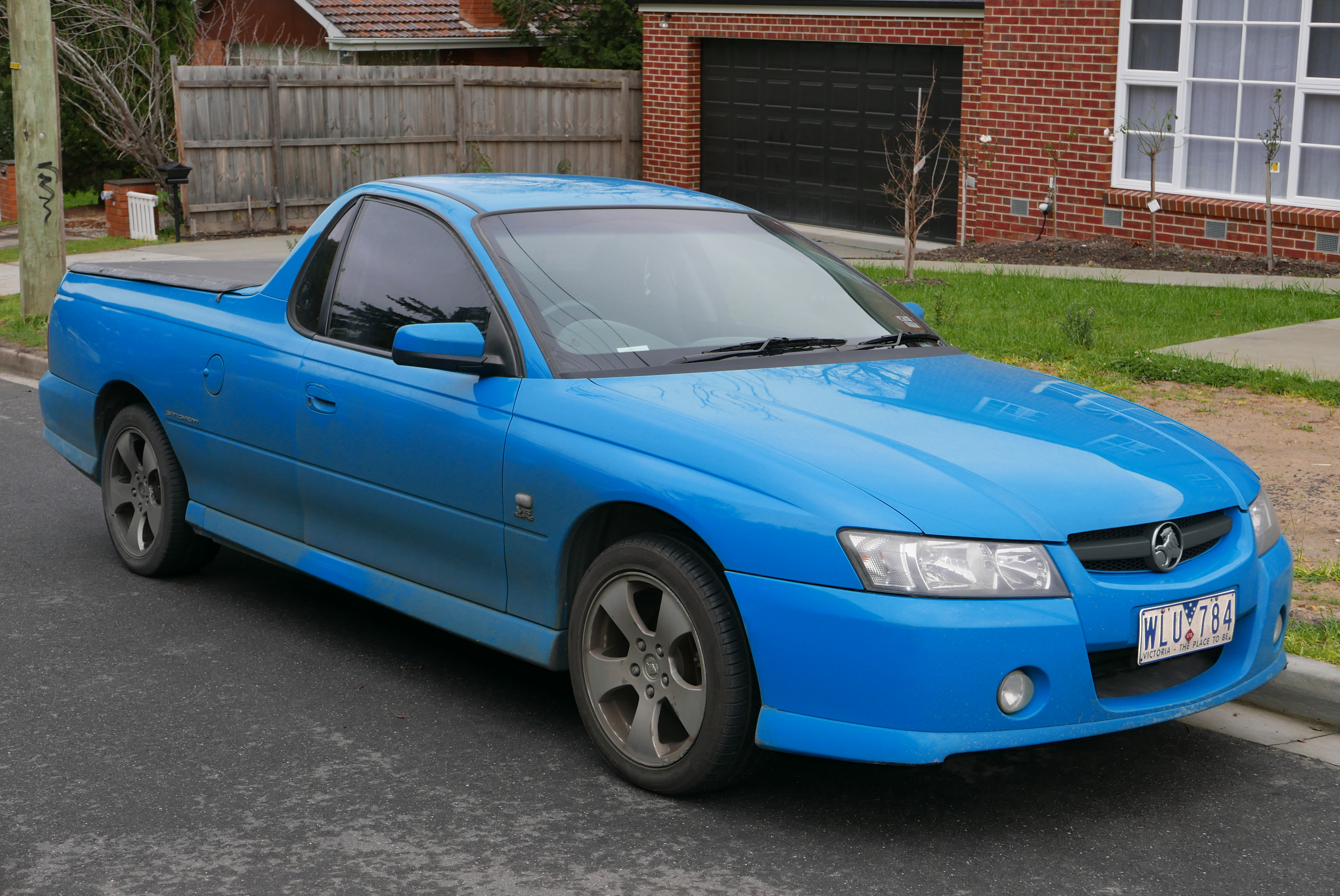
2005 Holden VZ Ute

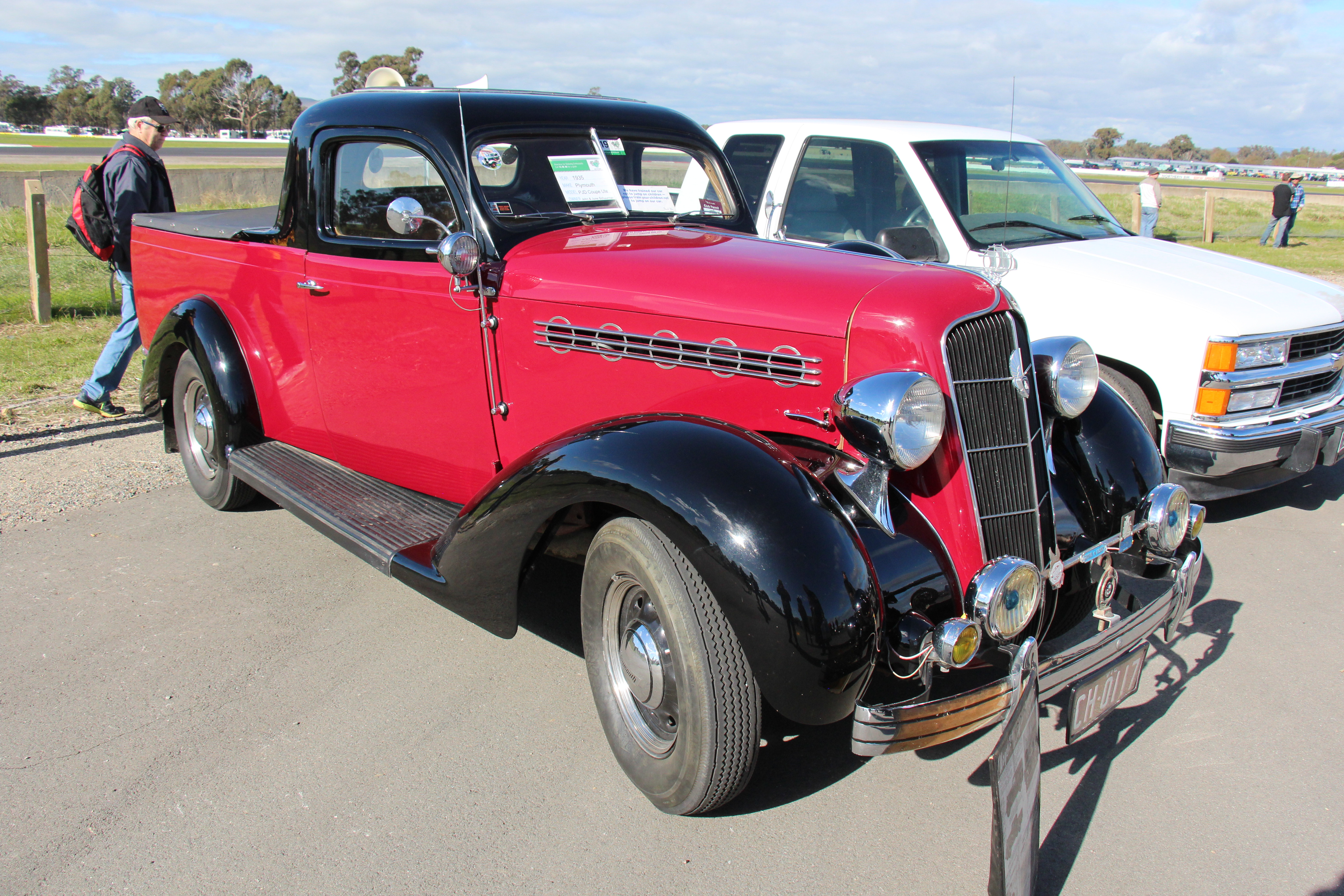
1935 Plymouth coupe utility

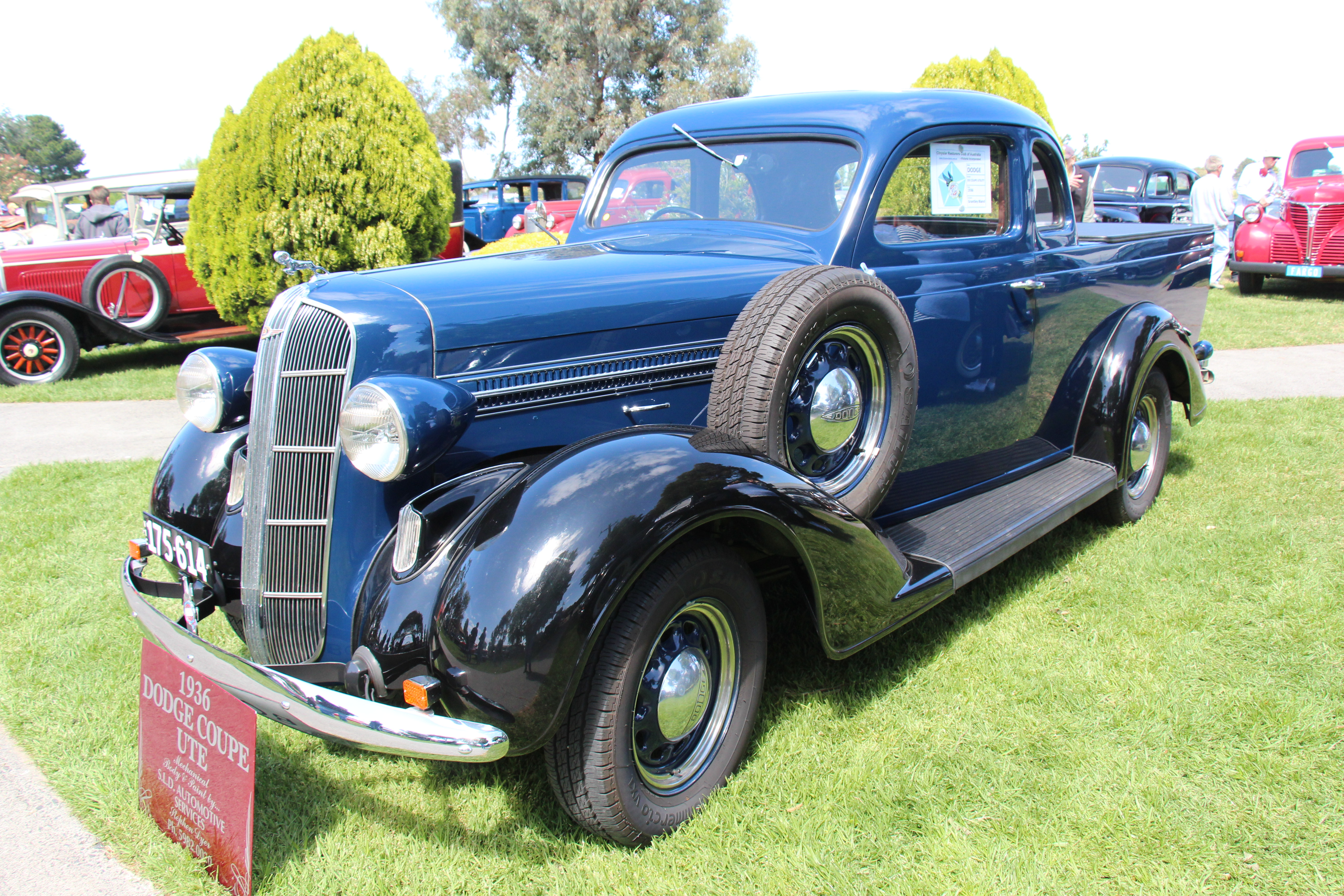
1936 Dodge D2 coupe Utility

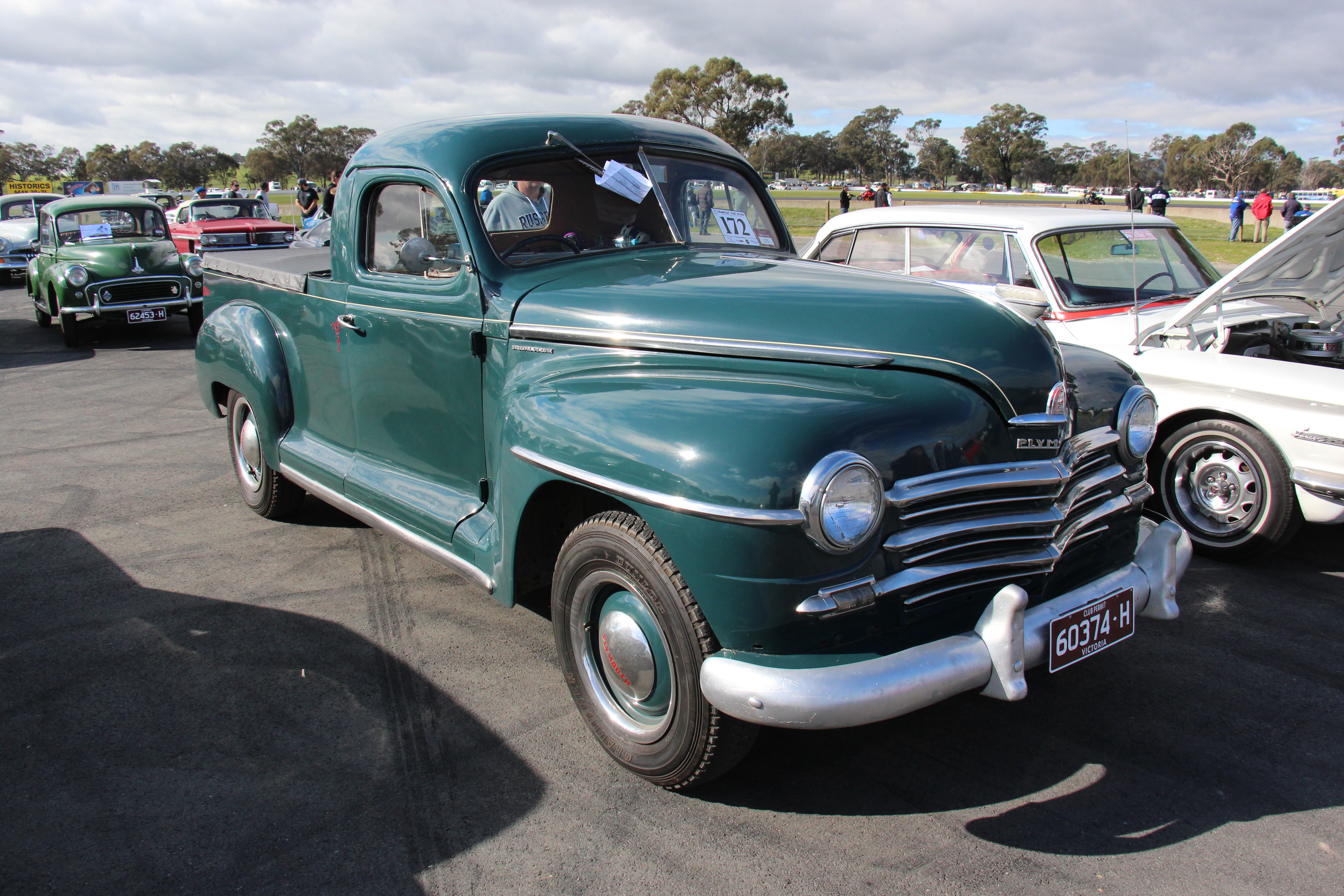
1947 Plymouth Special Deluxe utility

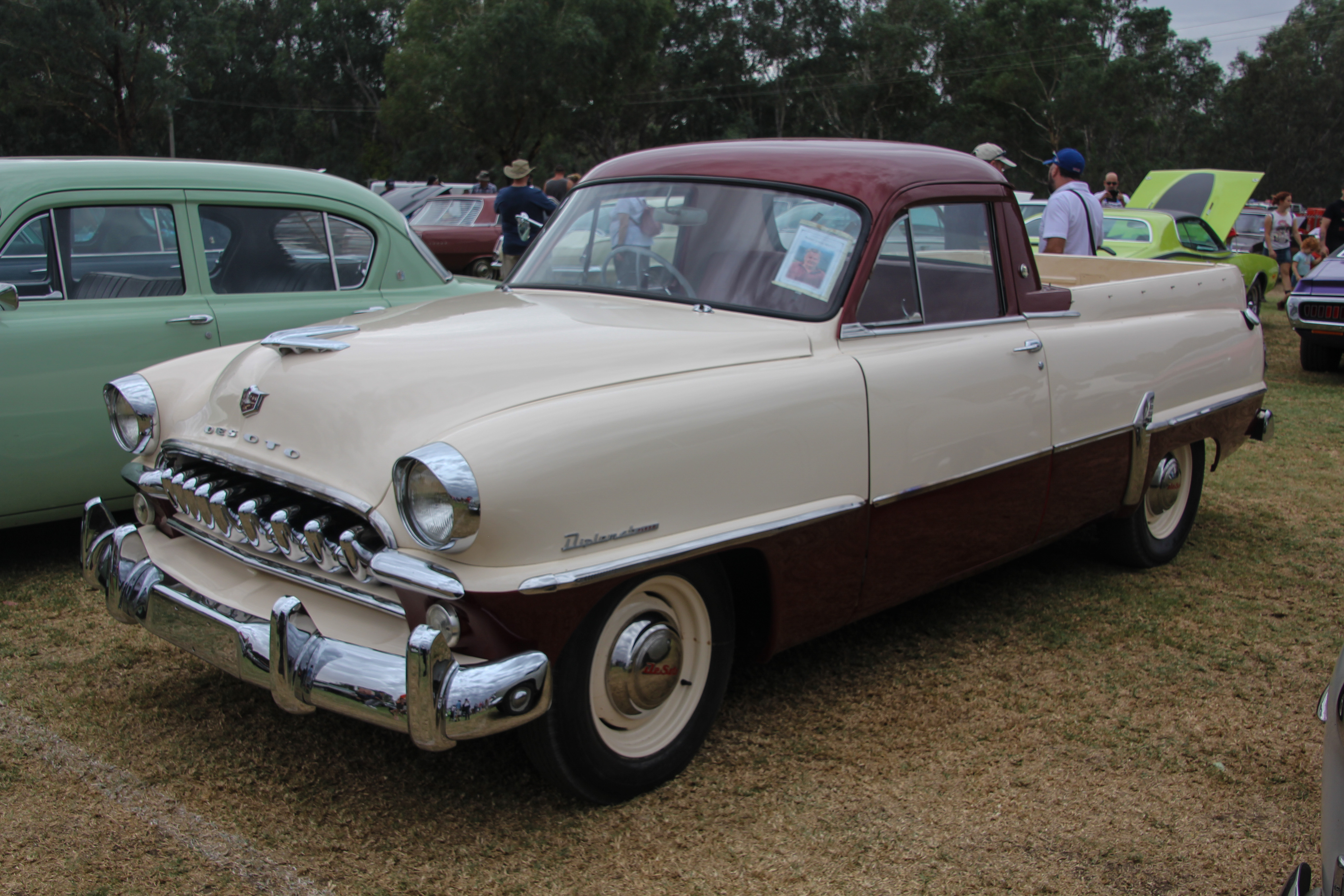
1956–57 DeSoto Diplomat Plaza utility

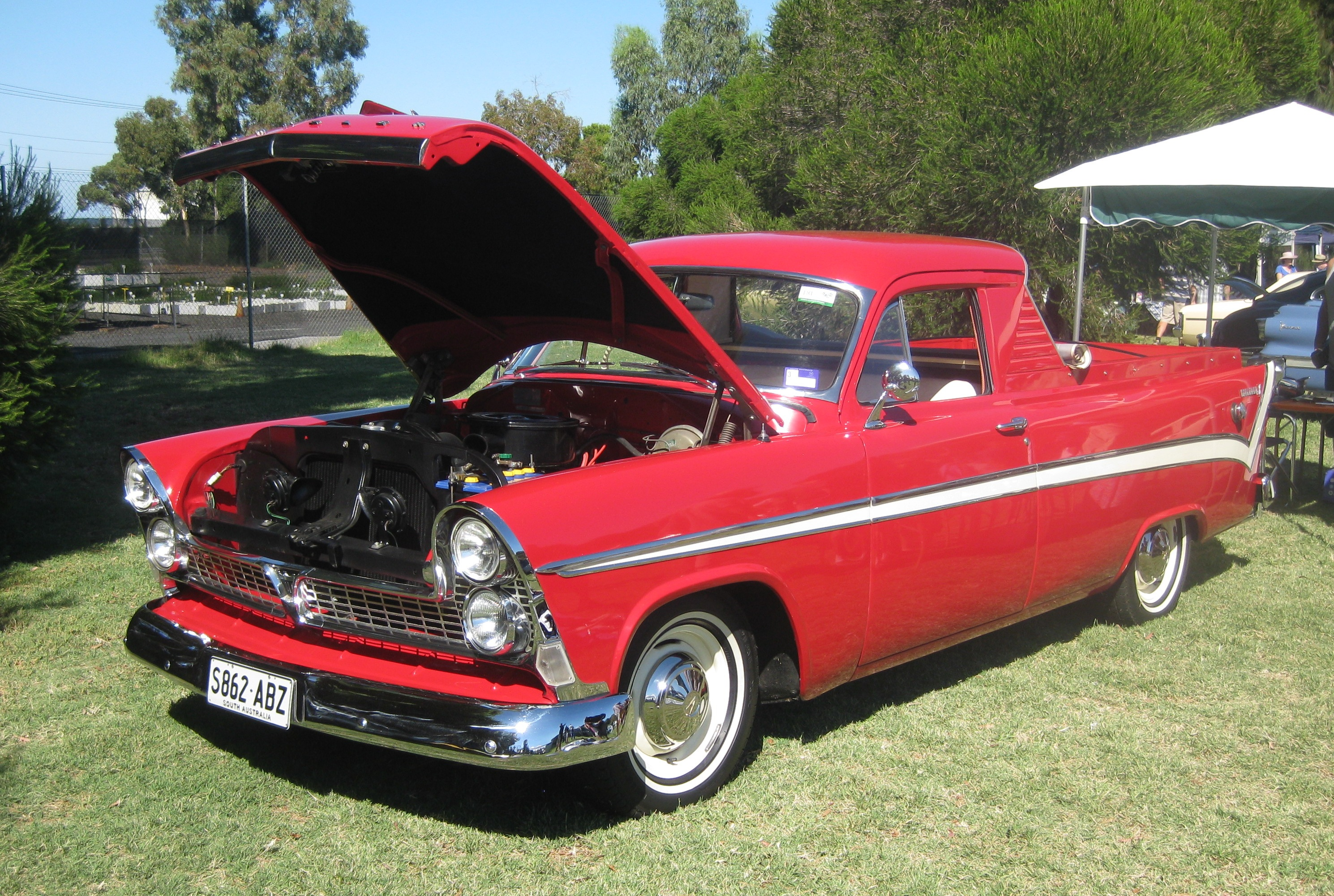
Chrysler AP3 Wayfarer utility

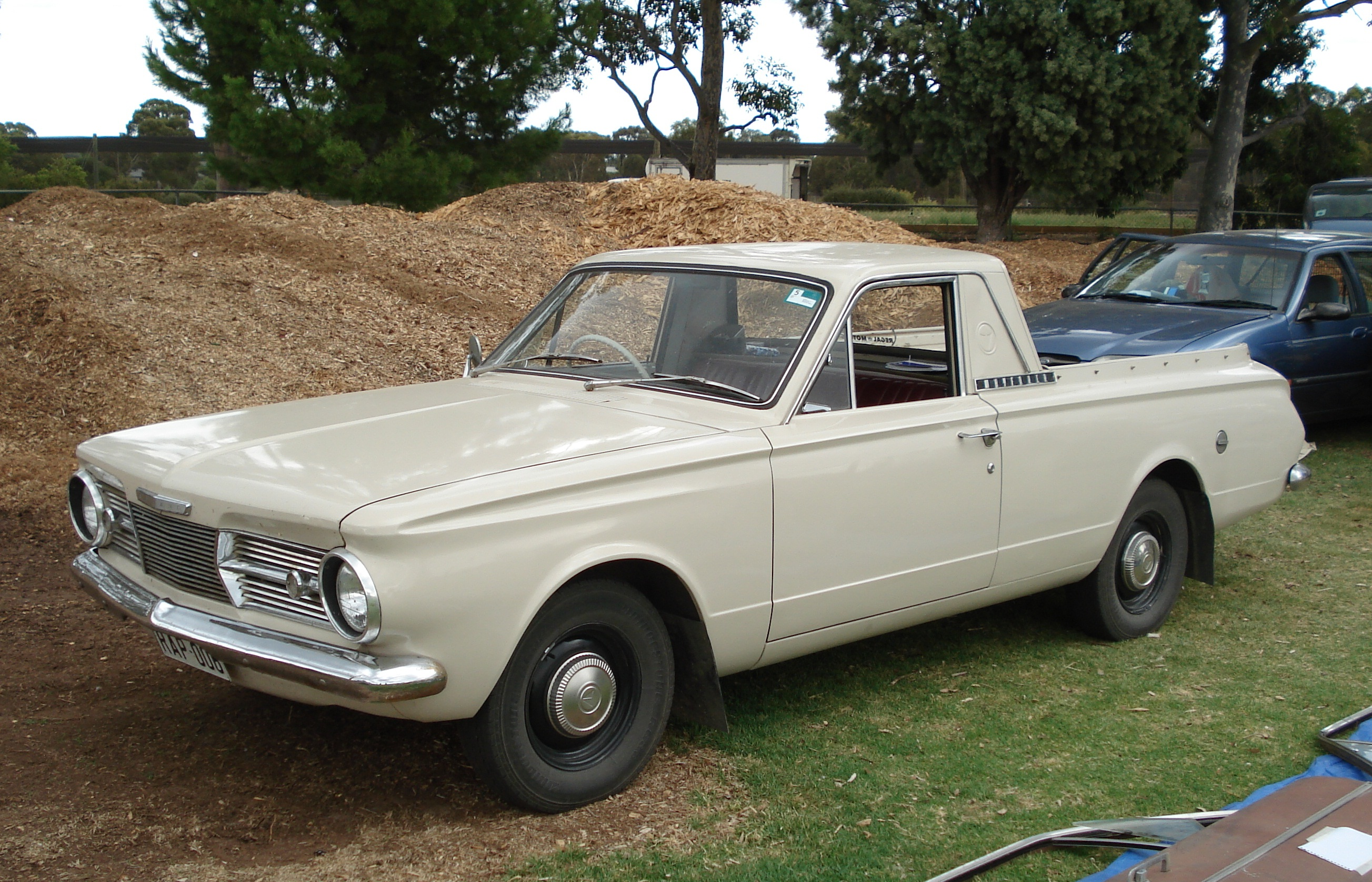
Chrysler AP6 Valiant Wayfarer utility

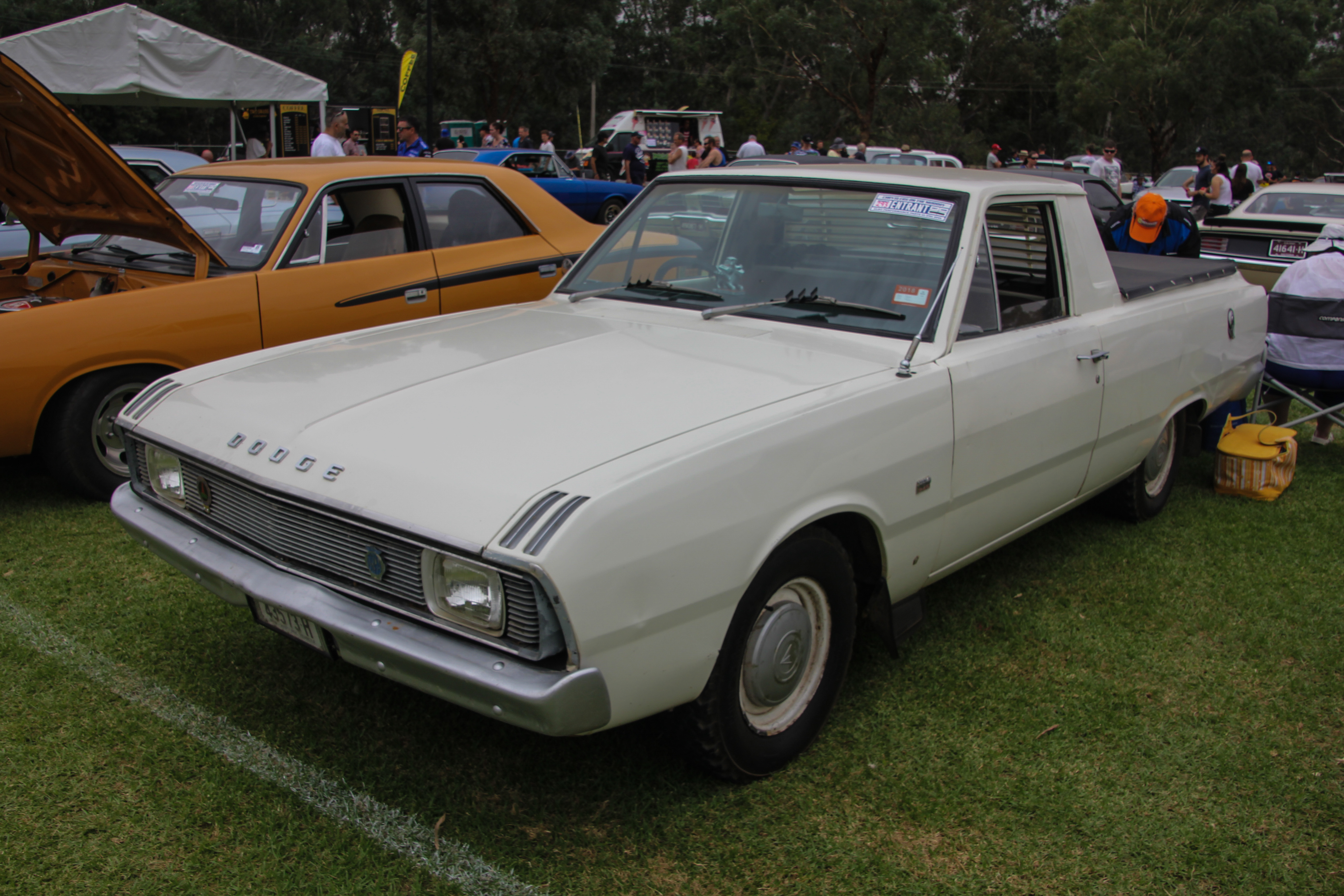
Dodge VG utility

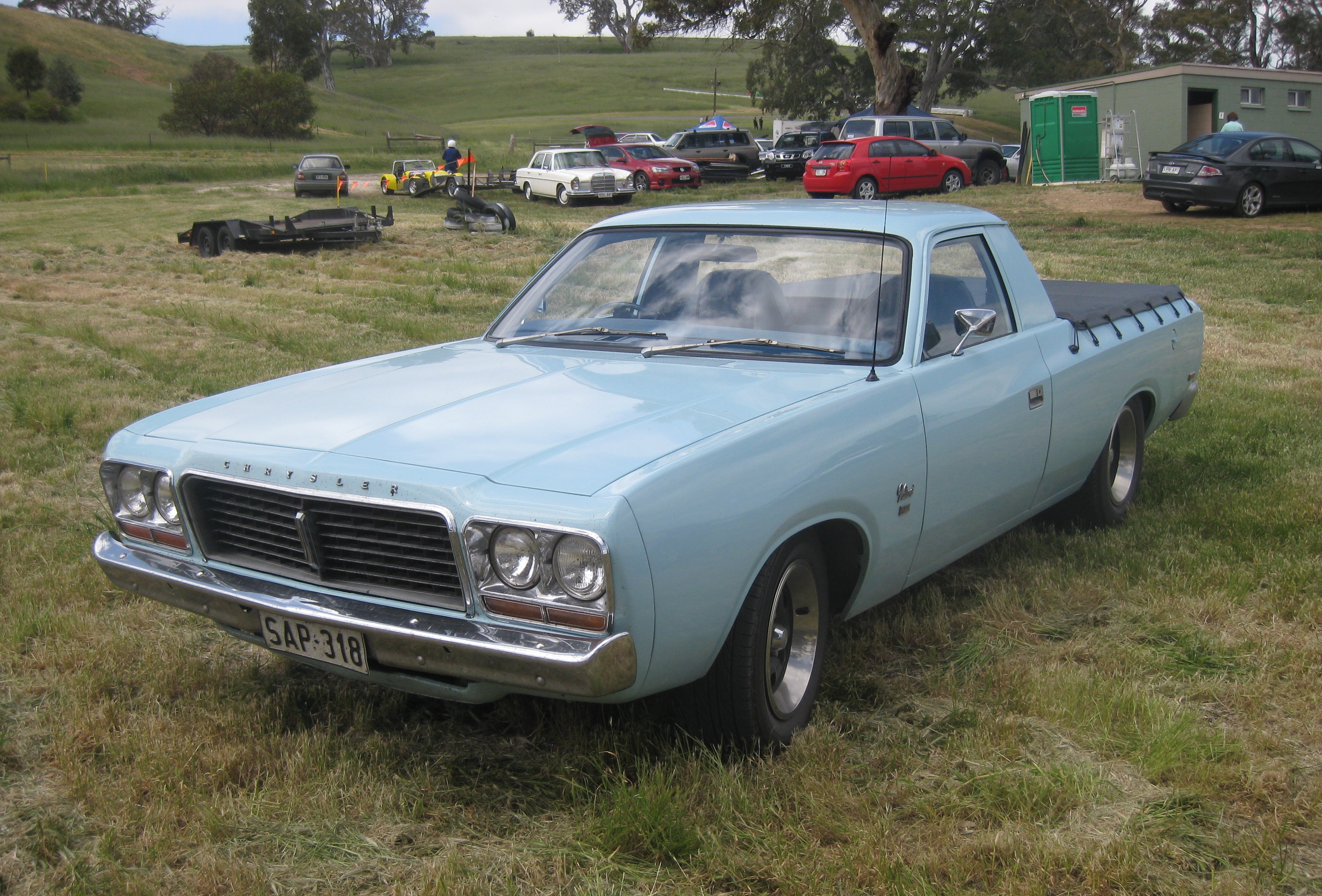
Chrysler CL Valiant utility

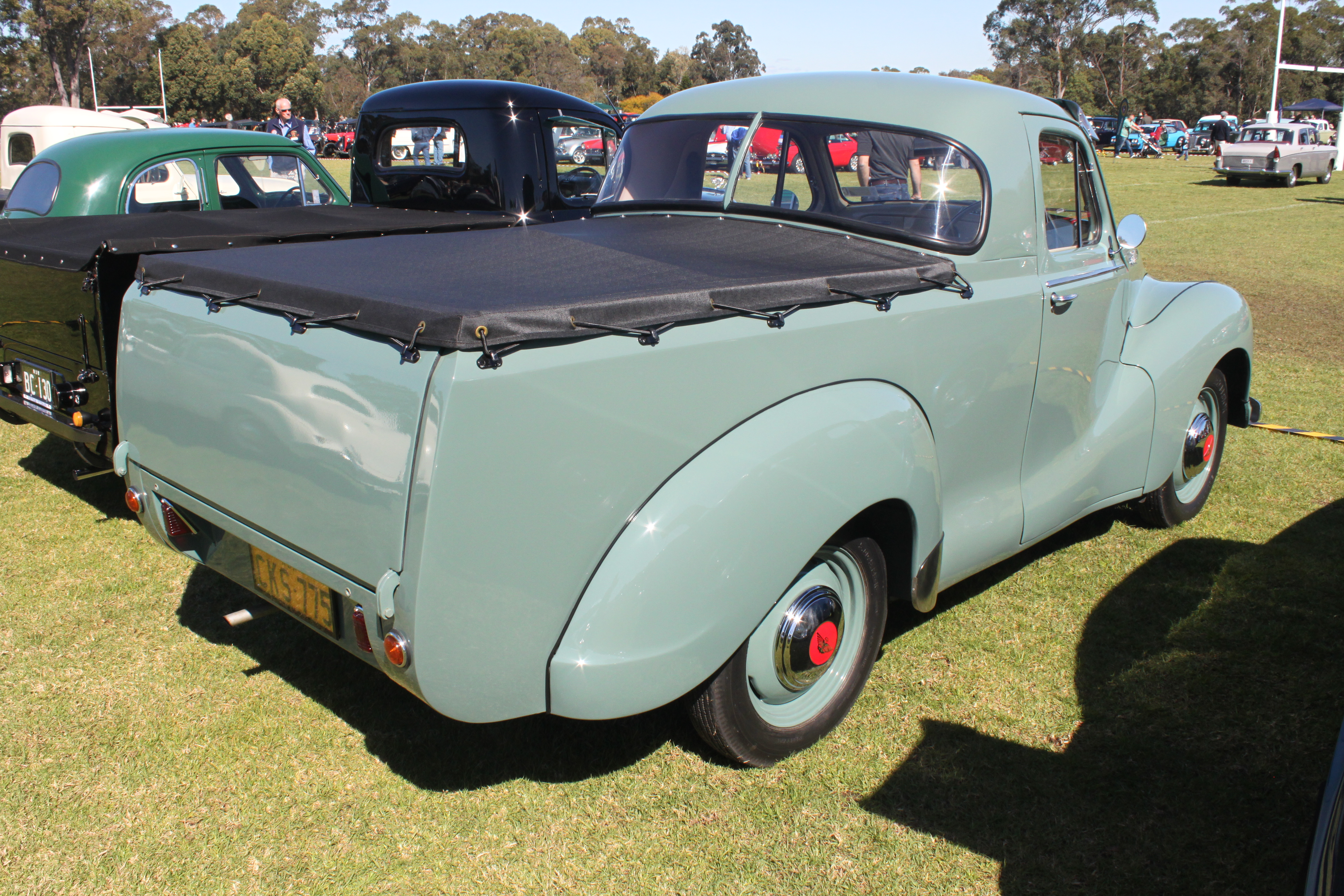
1953 Austin A40 utility

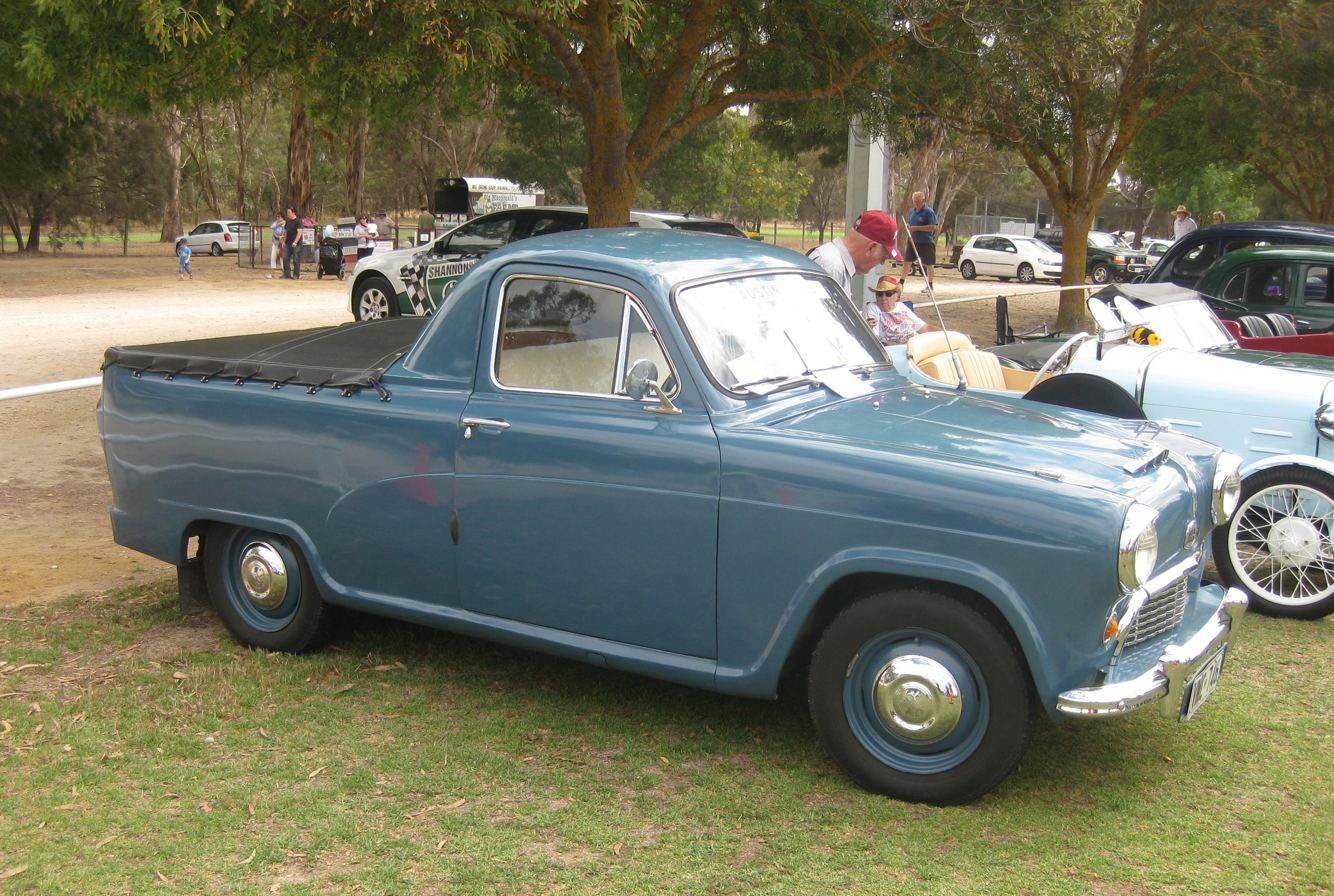
Austin A55 utility

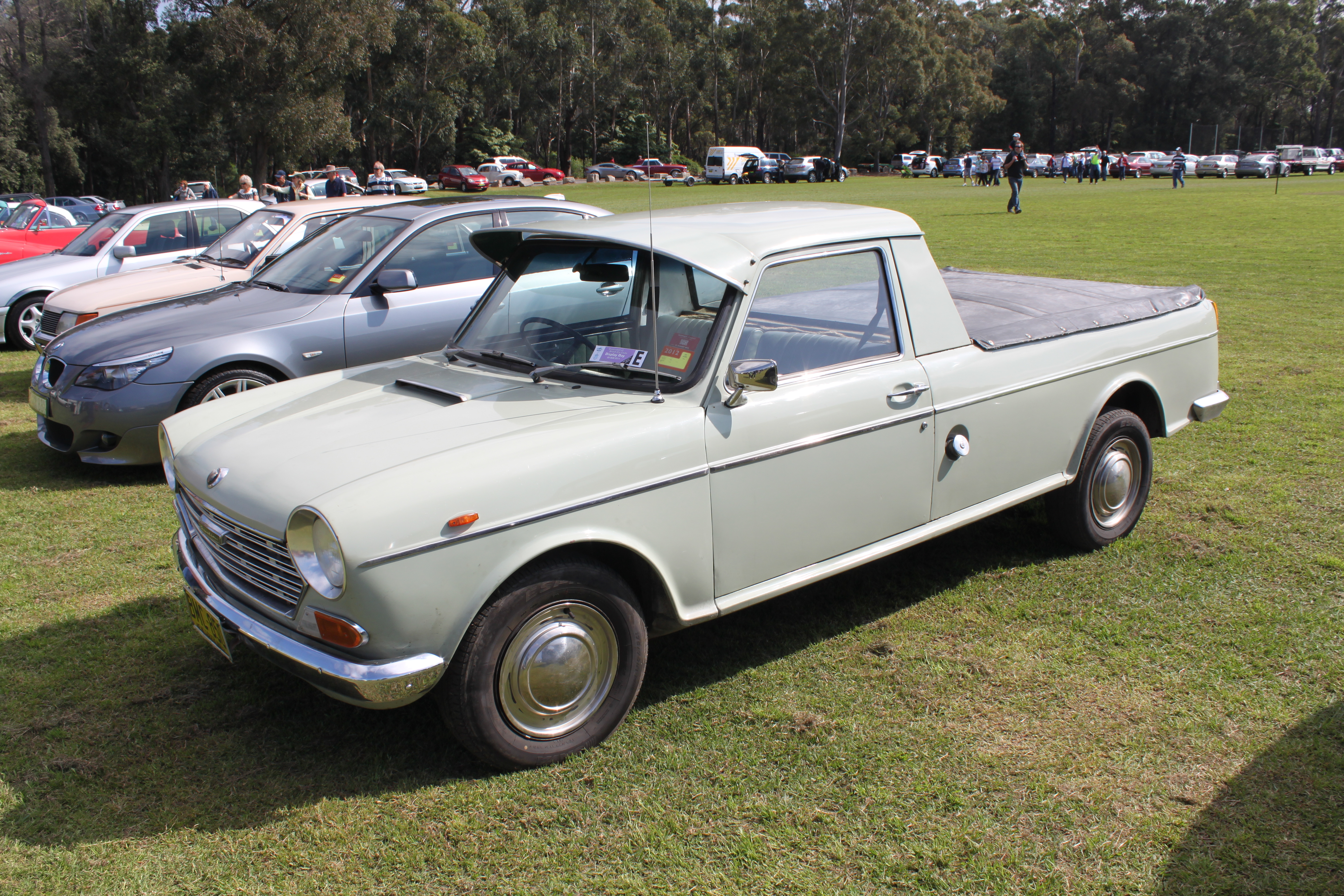
Austin 1800 utility

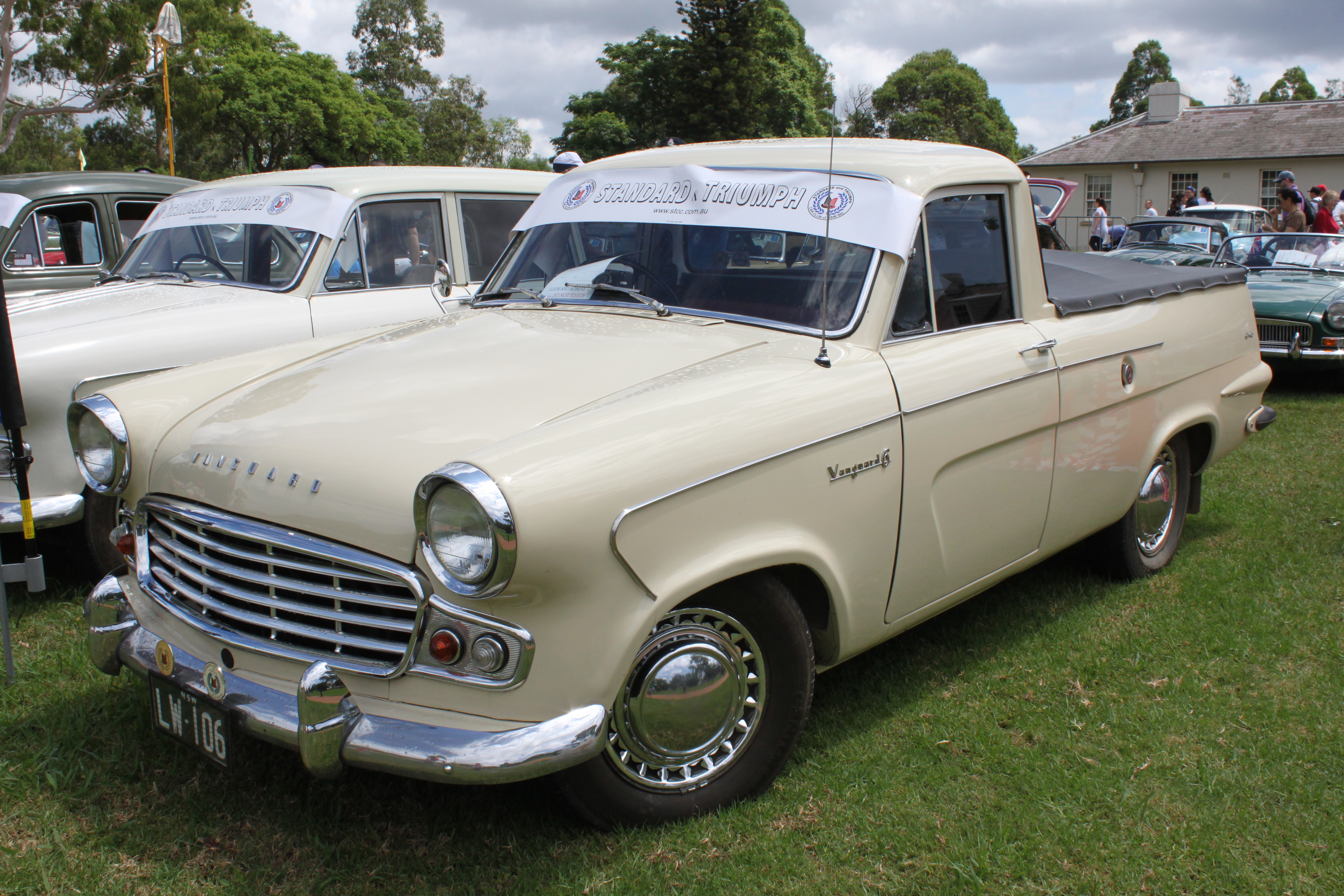
1961 Standard Vanguard utility

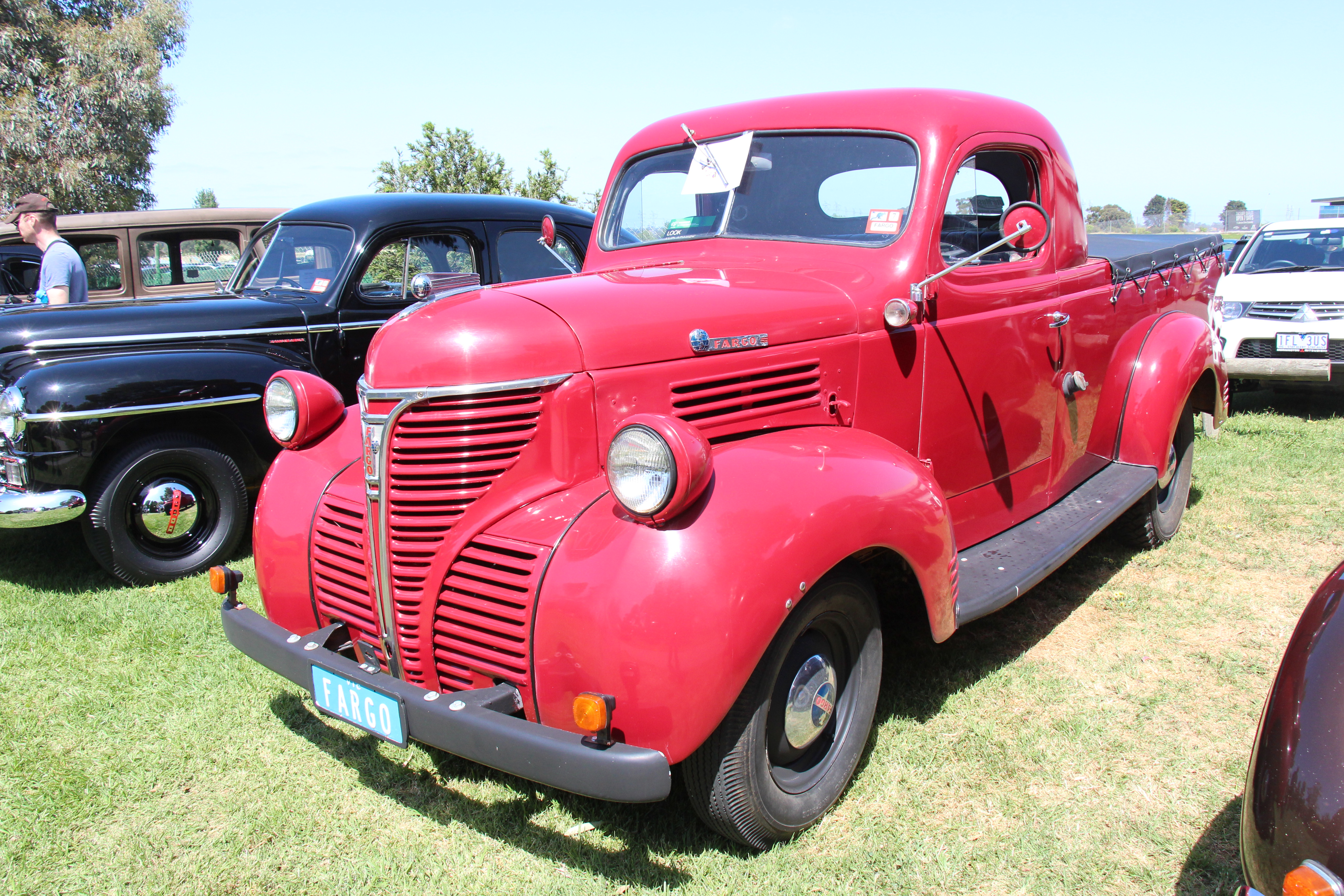
1946 Fargo utility

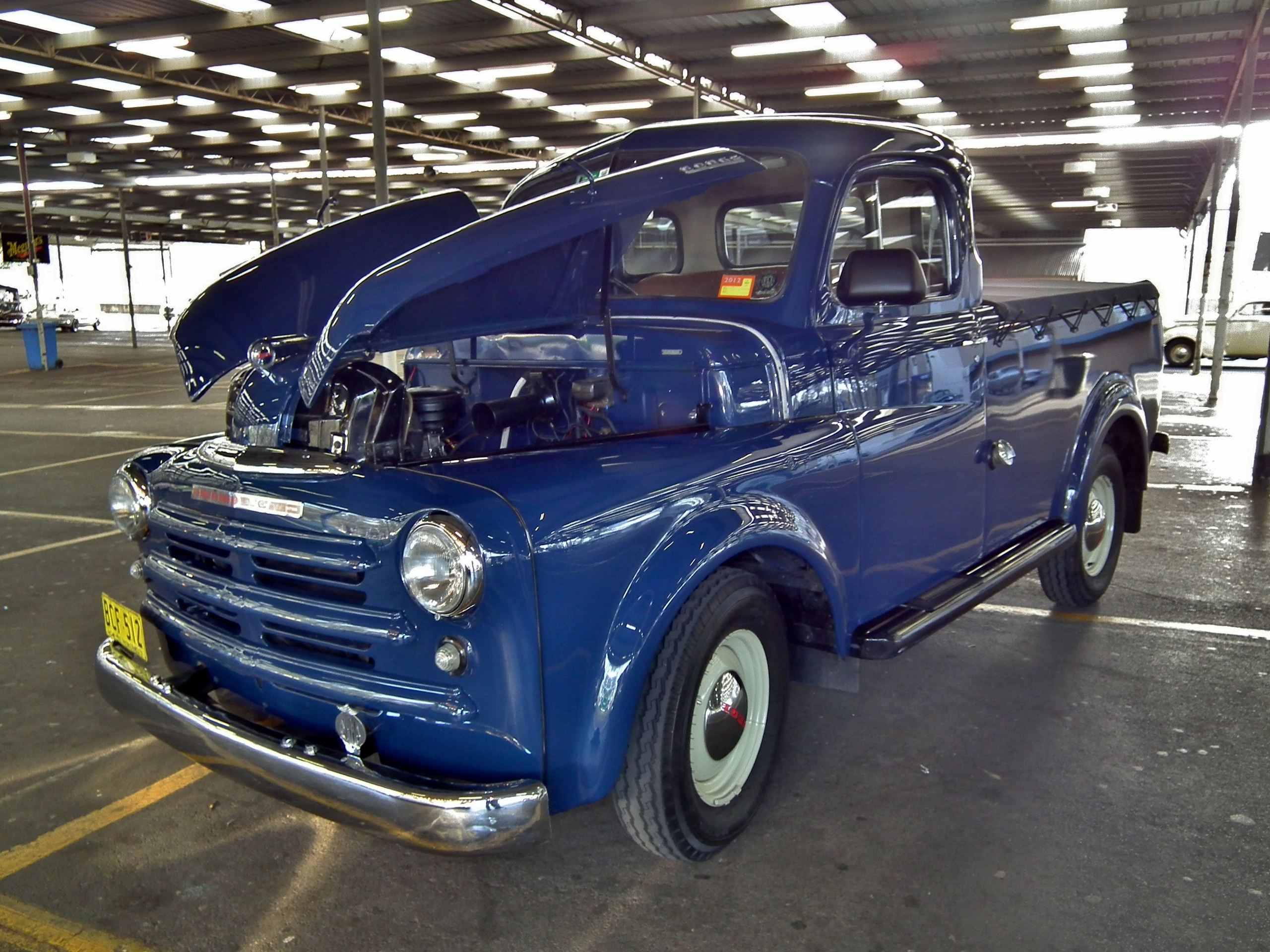
1953 Dodge 108-A utility

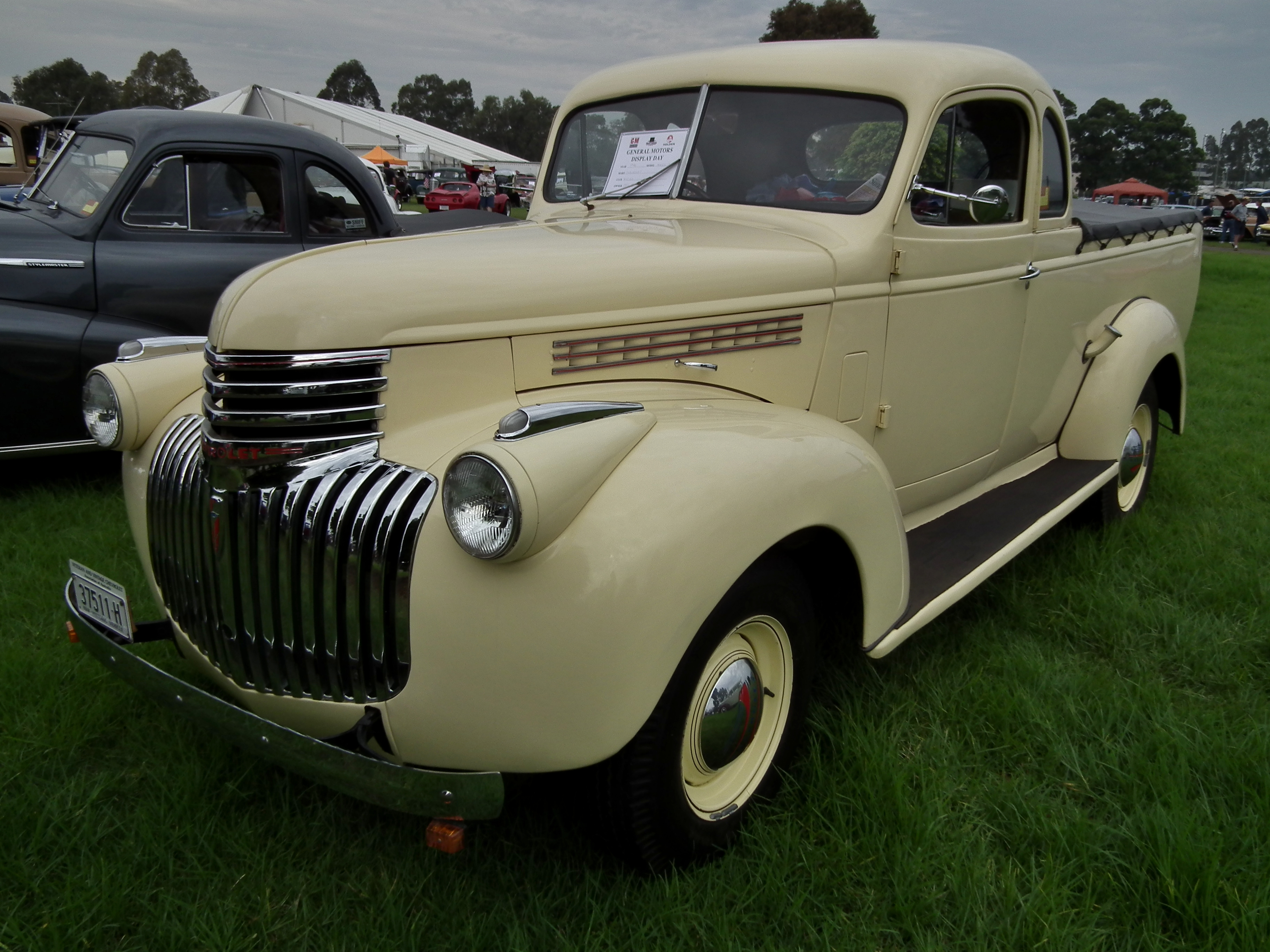
1946 Chevrolet Commercial utility

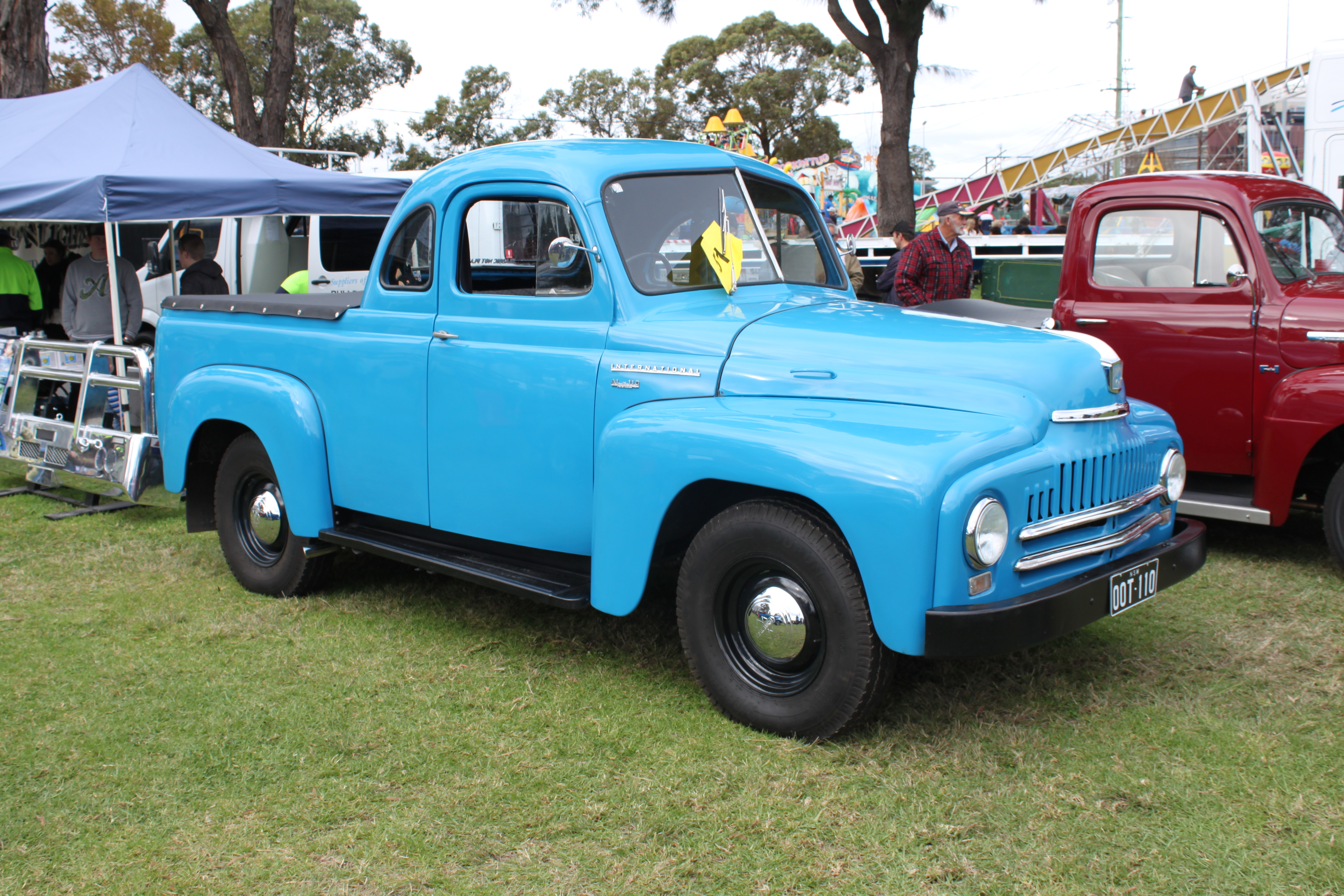
1952 International AL-110 Deluxe utility

== Prototypes ==
- AMC Cowboy: Derived from the Hornet, it was intended to compete with small pickups from Japan, but the project was canceled after AMC acquired Jeep, which already sold small pickups.
- Austin Metro Ranger: A concept based on the first generation model, it featured a full roll bar, flood lights, and a rear-mounted spare.
- BMW M3 ute/pickup: On April Fools' Day 2011, BMW announced the BMW M3 ute/pickup. This vehicle was based on the E93 Convertible and featured a structured aluminum pickup bed and removable targa roof. It was created by BMW's M Division as a one-off workshop transport vehicle for use within the company. It was actually the second such ute that BMW built for this purpose: they had previously built one using a first generation M3 convertible in 1986. This coupe ute served the factory for 26 years before the April Fools car was built to replace it.
- FSO Lanos: In addition to the panel version that began production that year, FSO built at least two Lanos utility prototypes in 2006, one two-door with an integrated bed and one four-door in a cab chassis configuration with a separate bed. These were original body styles developed by FSO rather than Daewoo or General Motors, most likely intended as a replacement for the FSO Polonez pickup.
- Pontiac G8 ST: A rebadged Holden Ute (which is based on the Holden Commodore sedan, which was rebadged as the Pontiac G8 in North America) was shown at the New York International Auto Show in March 2008. It was slated for release in the third quarter of 2009 for the 2010 model year, but was quickly cancelled before any were sold due to budgeting cuts and Pontiac's near bankruptcy.
- Toyota X-Runner: Concept vehicle displayed by Toyota Australia at the 2003 Melbourne and Sydney International Motor Shows. The body shell was largely based on that of the first generation Avalon (production of which picked up in Australia a few months after it left off in North America, and lasted until 2005), while the suspension and AWD parts were borrowed from the contemporary Lexus RX. It was intended for production, but Toyota of Australia could not get approval from the parent company.
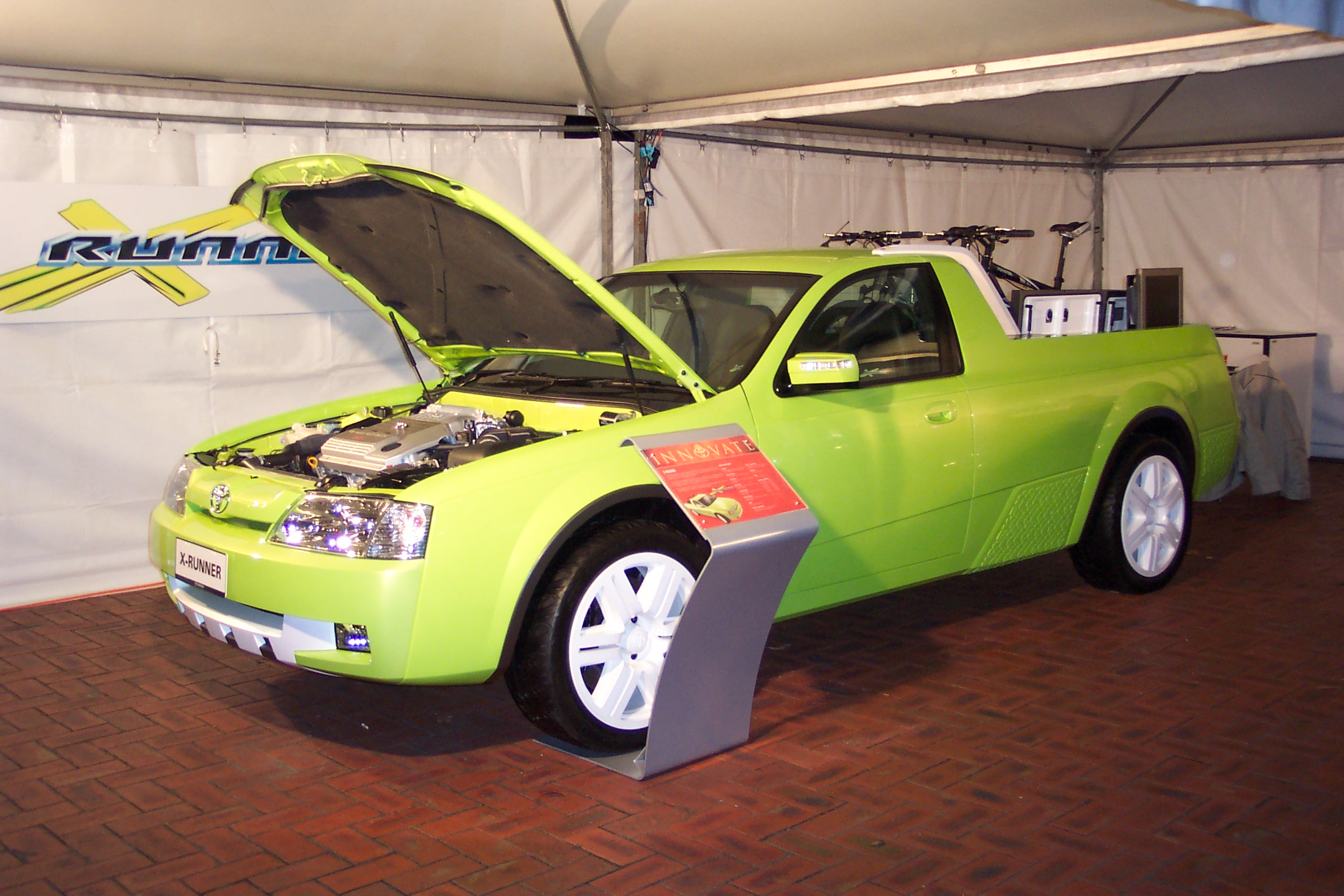
Toyota X-Runner concept utility as displayed at the 2003 Sydney International Motor Show

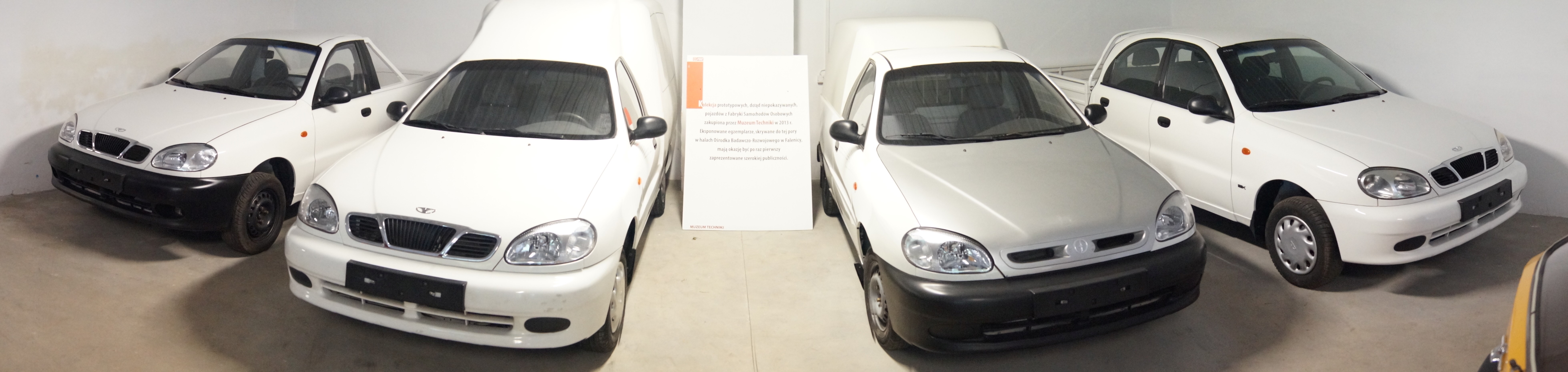
FSO Lanos commercial vehicle prototypes. The panel made it to production, but the two-door pickup with the integrated bed (far left) and the four-door cab chassis with the separate bed (far right) did not

== See also ==
- Car body styles
- Kei truck
- Pickup truck
- Roadster utility
- Truck classification
- Ute (vehicle)

== Bibliography ==
- Darwin, Norm. Early Australian Automotive Design; The First Fifty Years. ISBN 9780975690055.
