= Ford Falcon (XM) =

Australian full-size car

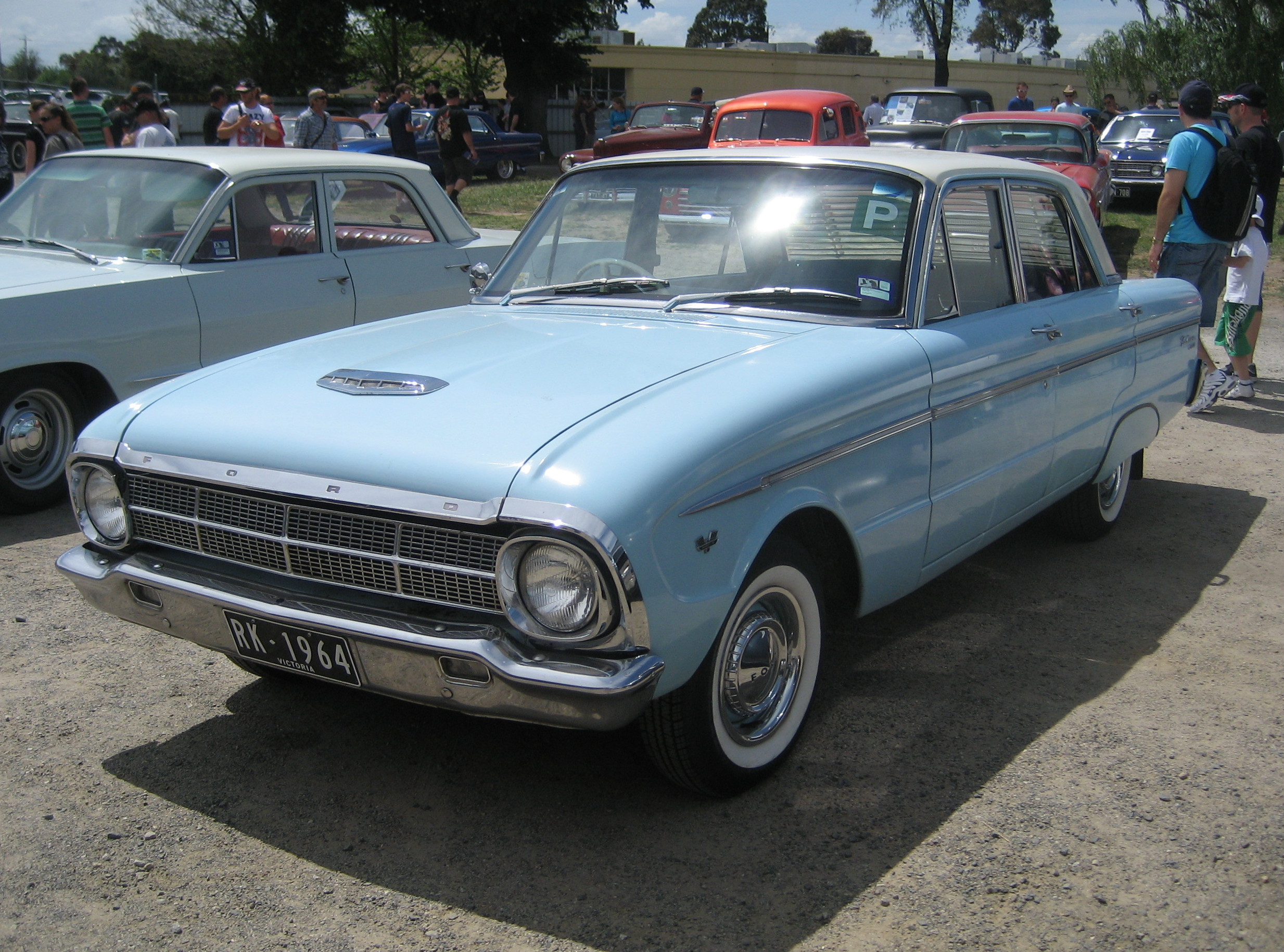
- Ford Falcon Deluxe Sedan (XM)

Overview
- Manufacturer: Ford Australia
- Production: February 1964 – February 1965

Body and chassis
- Class: Mid-size car
- Body style: 4-door sedan 4-door station wagon 2-door hardtop 2-door coupé utility 2-door panel van
- Layout: FR layout

Powertrain
- Engine: 2.4 L (144 cu in) Falcon Six I6; 2.8 L (170 cu in) Falcon Six I6; 3.3 L (200 cu in) Falcon Six I6
- Transmission: 3-speed manual 2-speed Fordomatic automatic

Dimensions
- Wheelbase: 2,781 mm (109.5 in)
- Length: 4,651 mm (183.1 in)
- Width: 1,793 mm (70.6 in)
- Height: 1,394 mm (54.9 in)
- Kerb weight: 1,106–1,305 kg (2,438–2,877 lb)

Chronology
- Predecessor: Ford XL Falcon
- Successor: Ford XP Falcon

The Ford Falcon (XM) is a mid-size car that was produced by Ford Australia between February 1964 and February 1965. It was the third iteration of the first generation of the Ford Falcon.

== Overview ==
The XM series Falcon range was introduced in February 1964, as a replacement for the XL series Falcon. The XM featured around 1,500 modifications from the XL, including numerous changes to the suspension which now featured stronger ball joints, new front upper wishbones, coil-over shock units and relocated rear spring-hangers. Also new were bigger axle shafts and tougher engine mounts. The vacuum operated windscreen wipers of the XL series were replaced by a two-speed electric motor unit and the seats were stronger with better quality upholstery. Unlike previous Australian Falcons, the XM represented a significant departure from the contemporary US Ford Falcon models in terms of exterior styling.

Both of the engines from the XK and XL Falcons were retained, albeit with a small power increase for both engines; a 144 cu in (2,360 cc) Falcon Six inline-six, which produced 96 hp (72 kW; 97 PS) and an optional 170 cu in (2,786 cc) version of the Falcon Six, which produced 111 hp (83 kW; 113 PS). For higher specification models, such as the Deluxe trim, a 200 cu in (3,277 cc) version of the Falcon Six was available for the first time (often referred to as the Super Pursuit engine), and produced 121 hp (90 kW; 123 PS). The 170 engine was also made the standard engine for the top-spec Futura models.

A two-door hardtop body style was added to the range in July 1964. It was offered in Falcon Deluxe Hardtop and Falcon Futura Hardtop trim levels, with the 170 cubic inch "Pursuit 170" engine as standard equipment and the 200 cubic inch "Super Pursuit" available as an option on both models.

== Model range ==
The Falcon XM passenger car range, released in February 1964, comprised three sedan and three station wagon models, marketed as follows:

- Falcon Sedan
- Falcon Deluxe Sedan
- Falcon Futura Sedan
- Falcon Wagon
- Falcon Deluxe Wagon
- Falcon Squire Wagon

The Falcon XM Hardtop range, released in July 1964, comprised two models, marketed as follows:

- Falcon Deluxe Hardtop
- Falcon Futura Hardtop

The Falcon XM commercial vehicle range comprised four models:

- Falcon Standard Utility
- Falcon Deluxe Utility
- Falcon Standard Sedan Delivery
- Falcon Deluxe Sedan Delivery
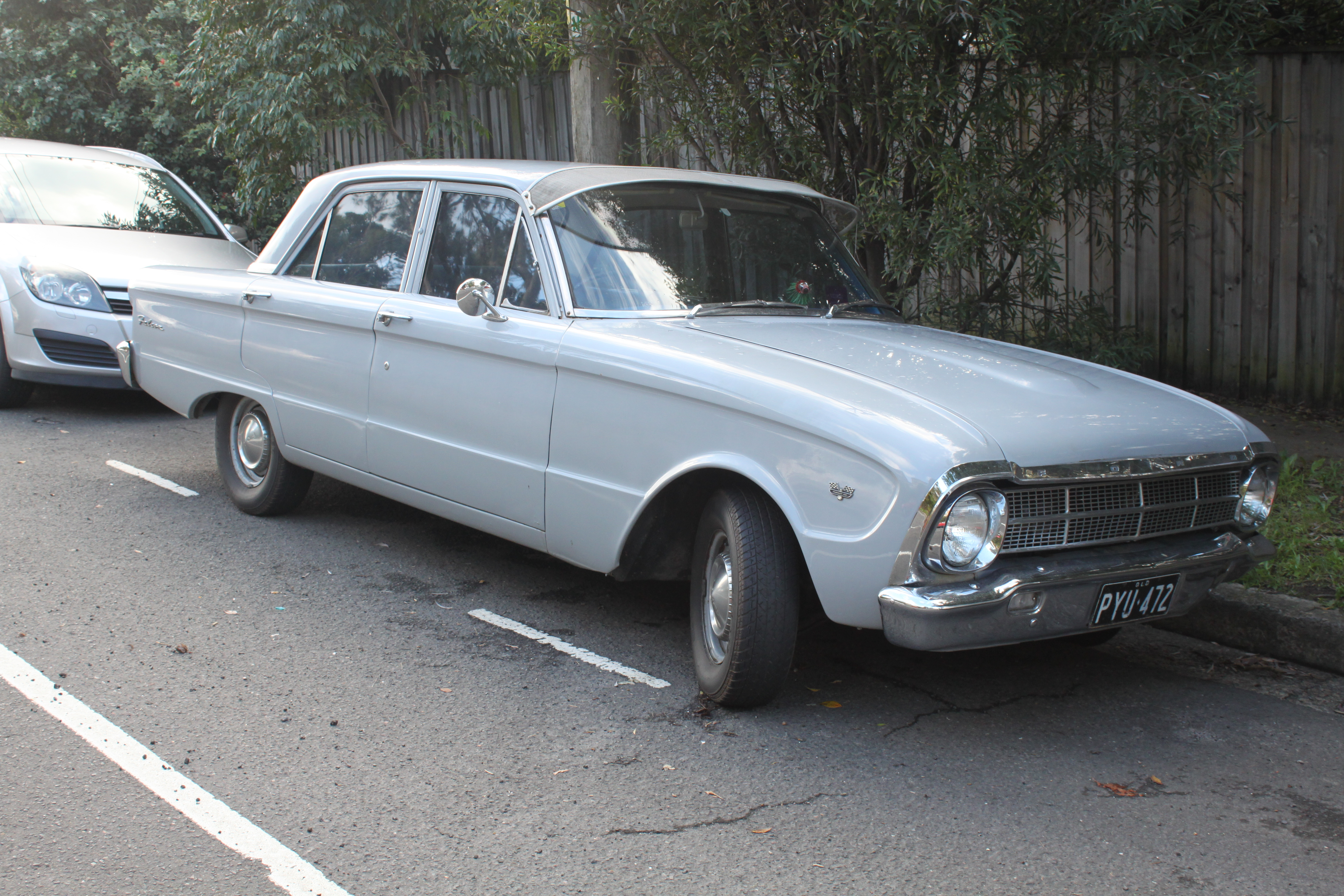
Ford XM Falcon Sedan

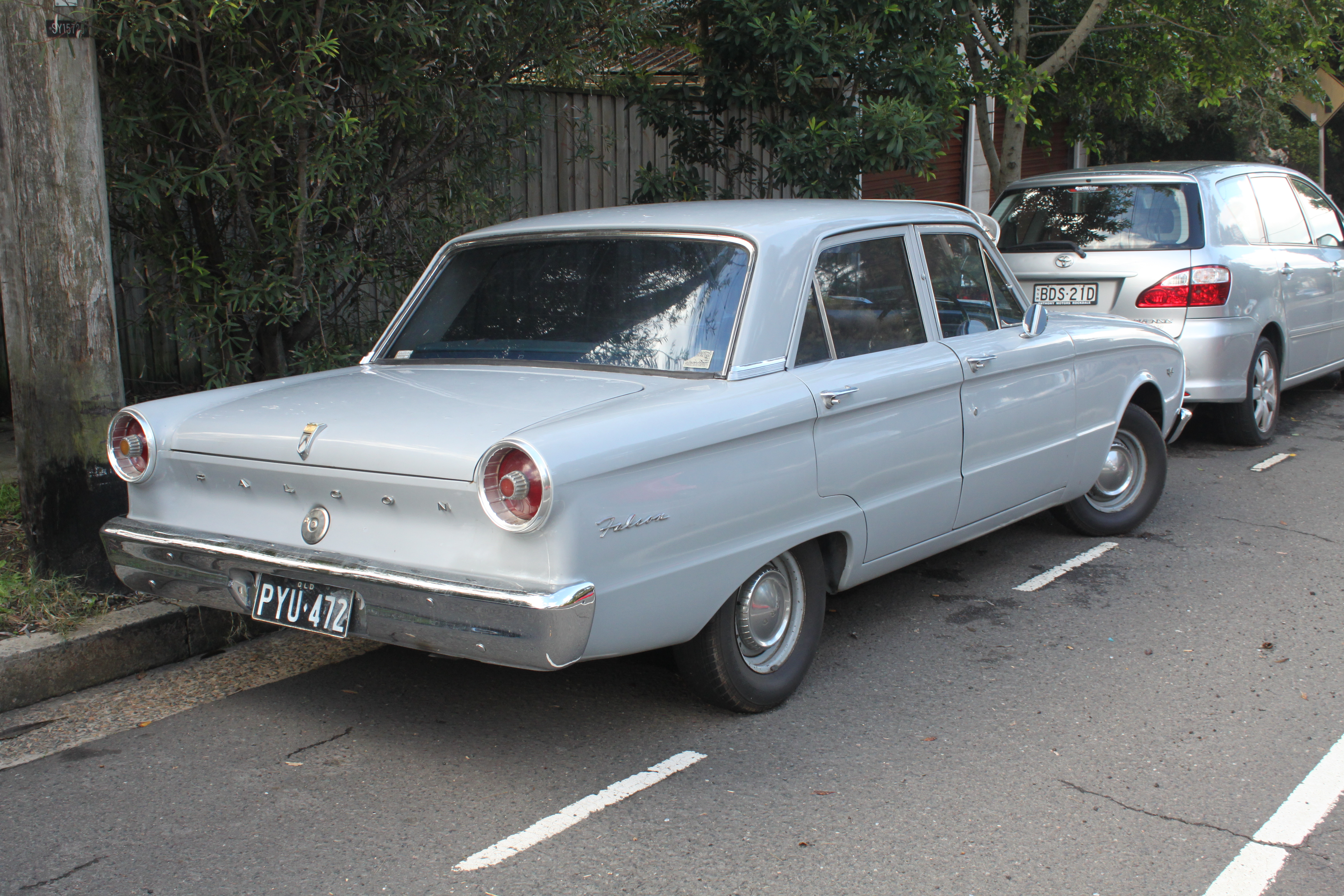
Ford XM Falcon sedan

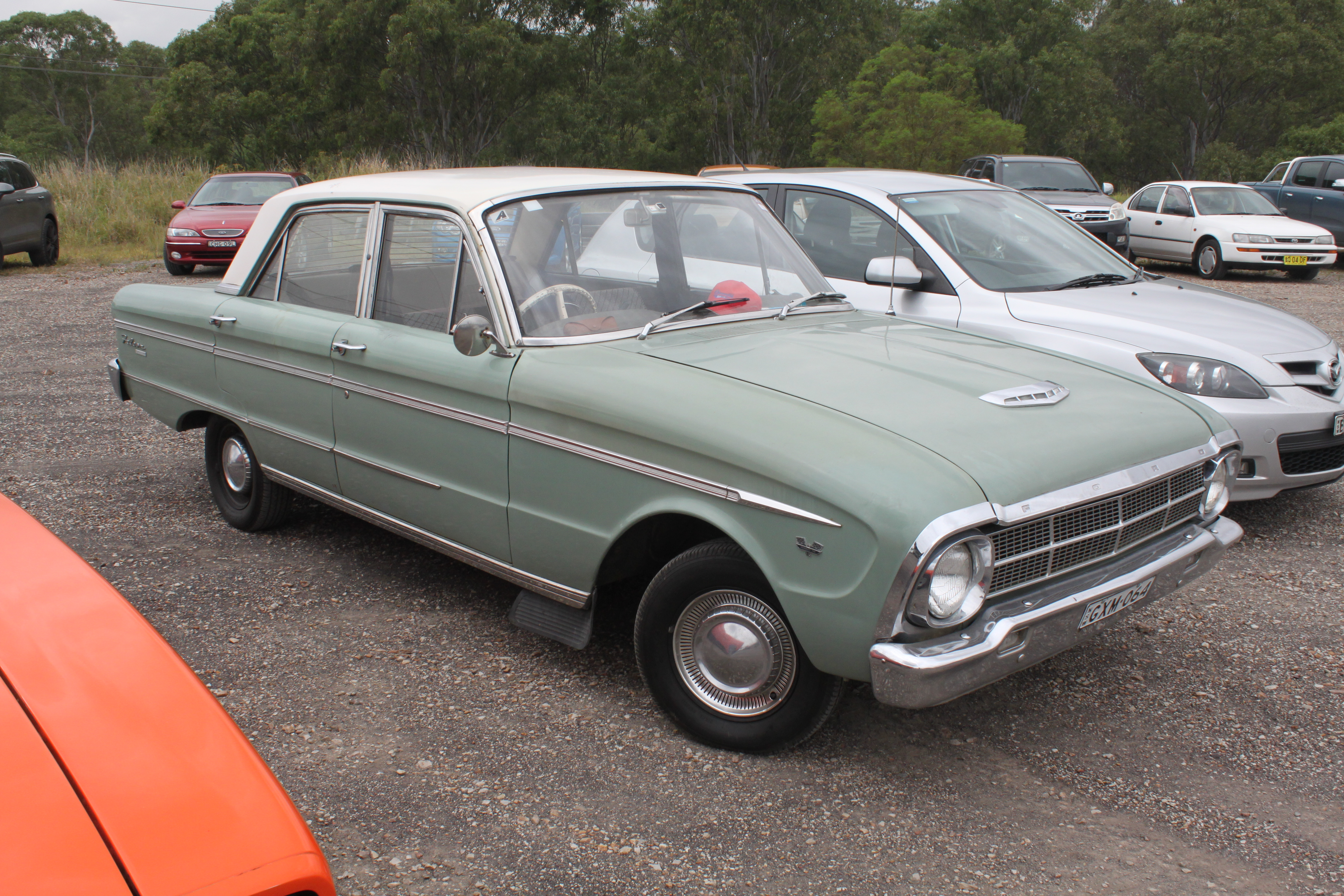
Ford XM Falcon Deluxe Sedan

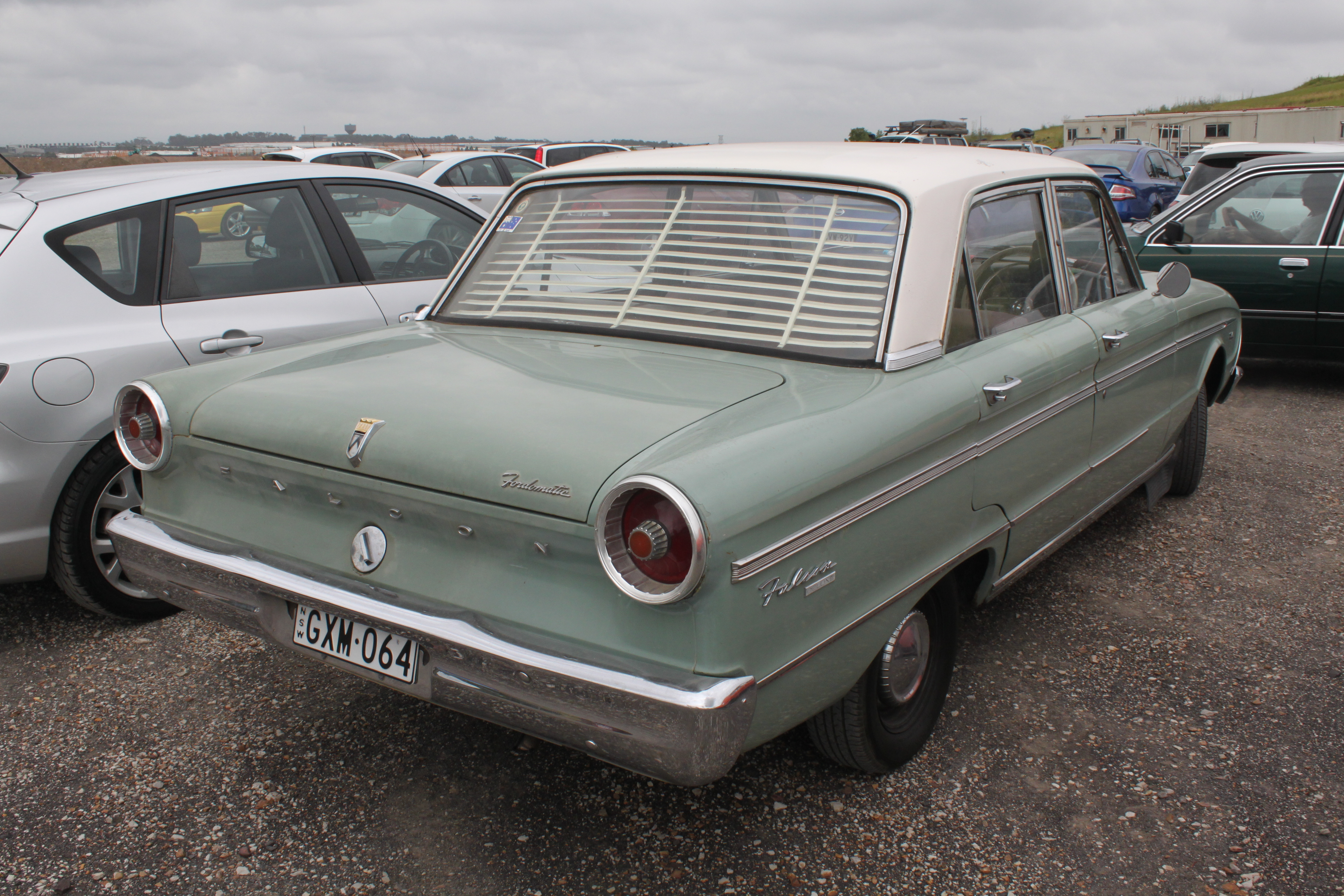
Ford XM Falcon Deluxe sedan

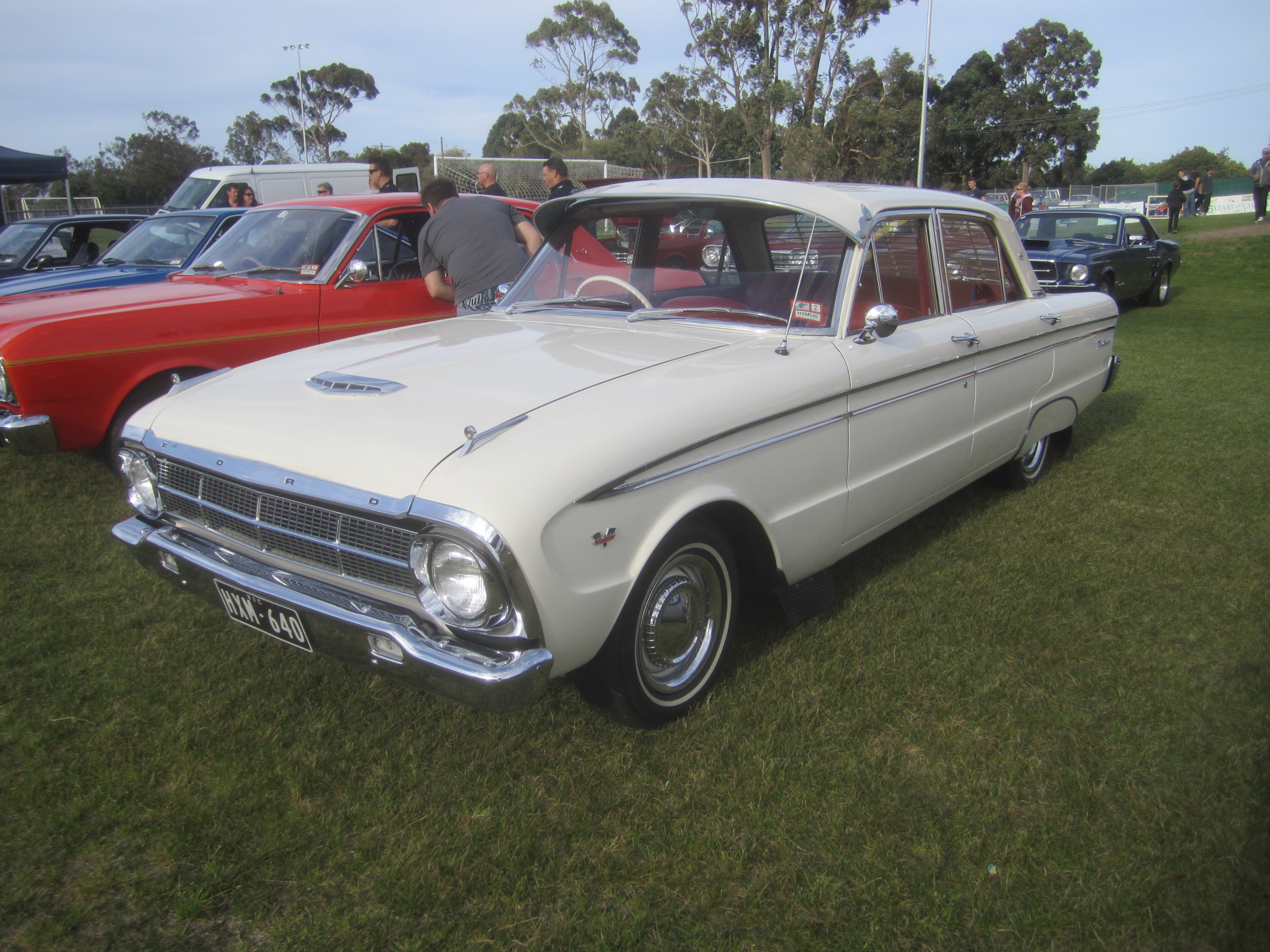
Ford XM Falcon Futura sedan

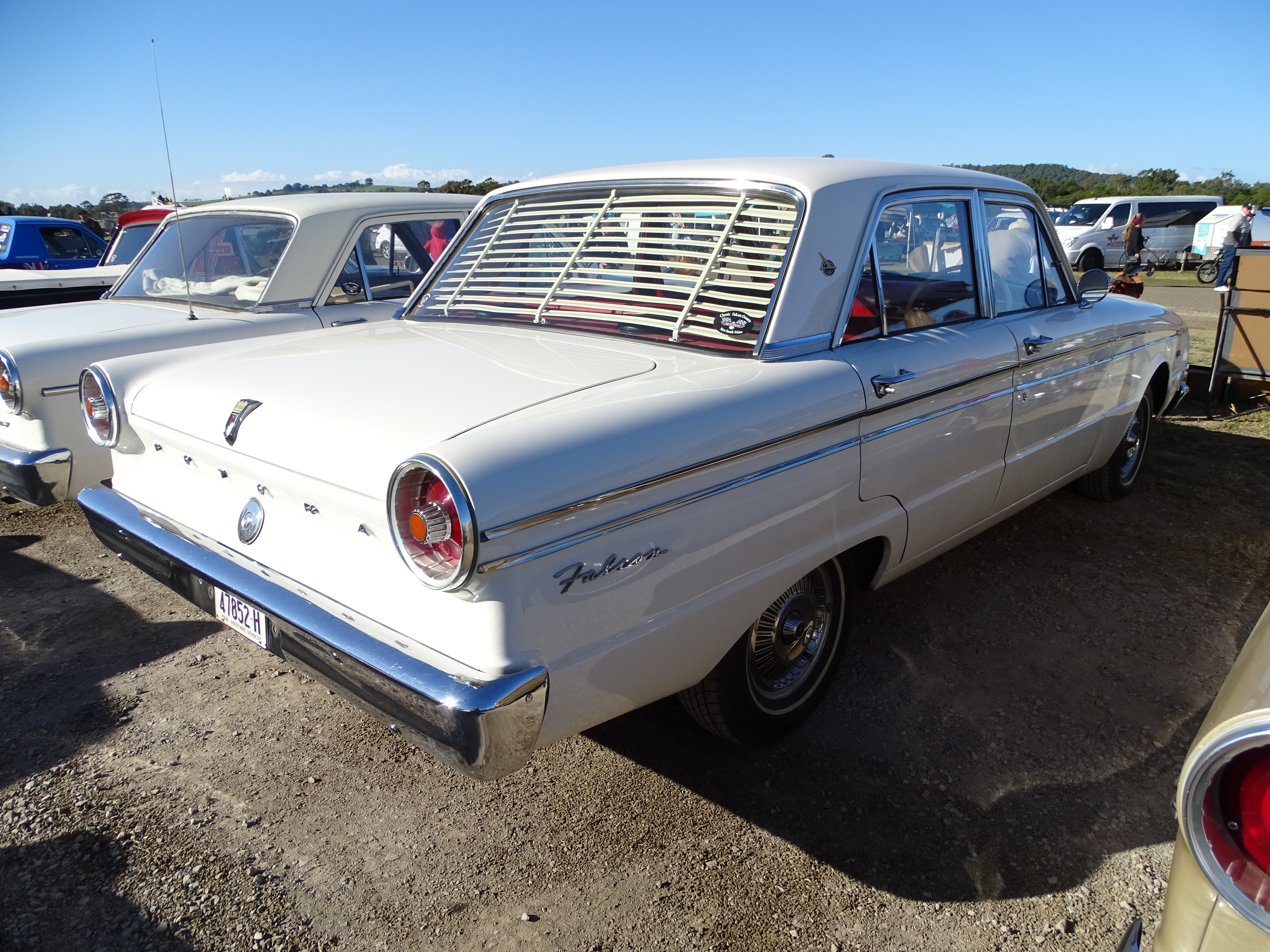
Ford XM Falcon Futura sedan

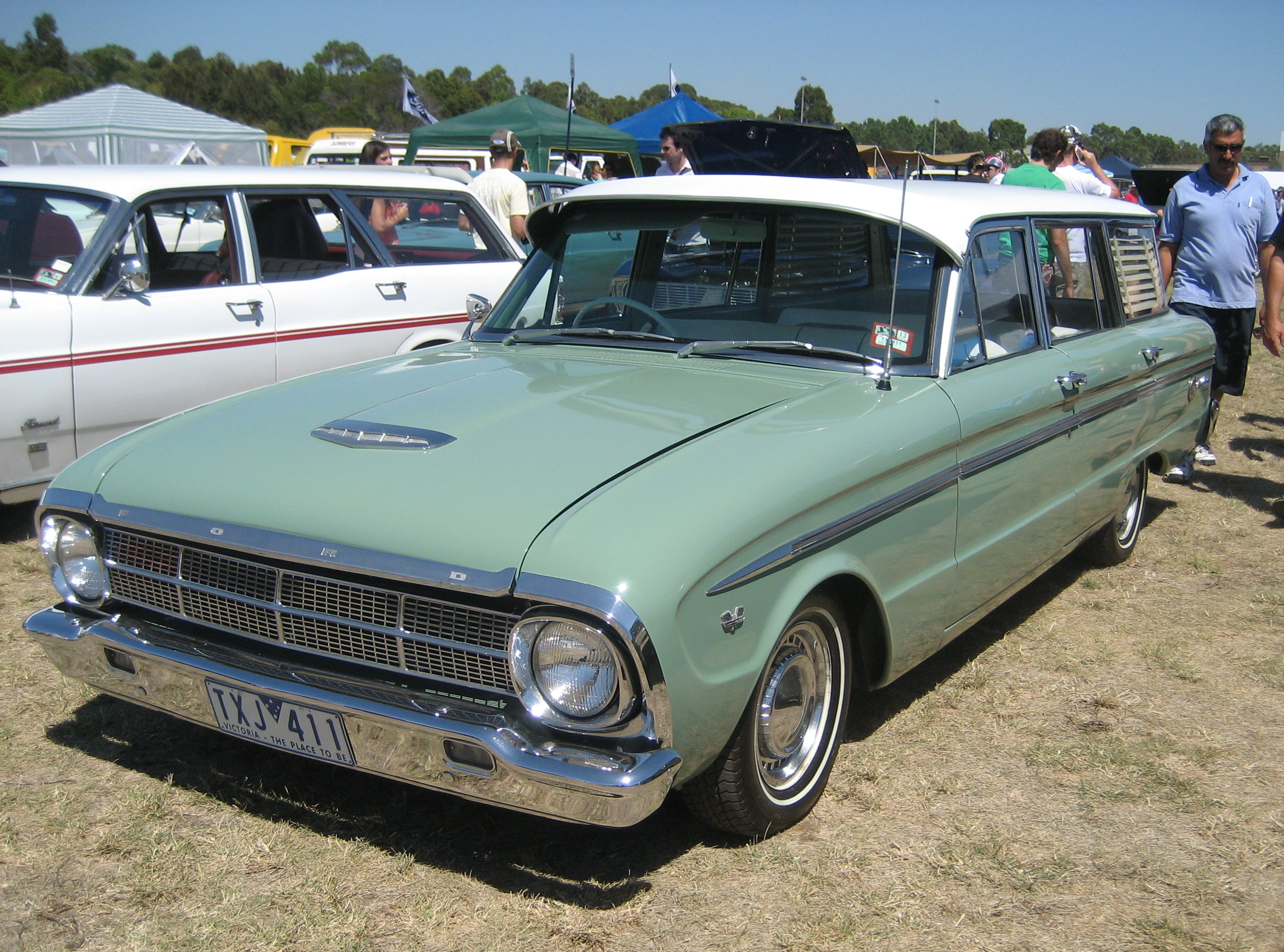
Ford XM Falcon Deluxe wagon

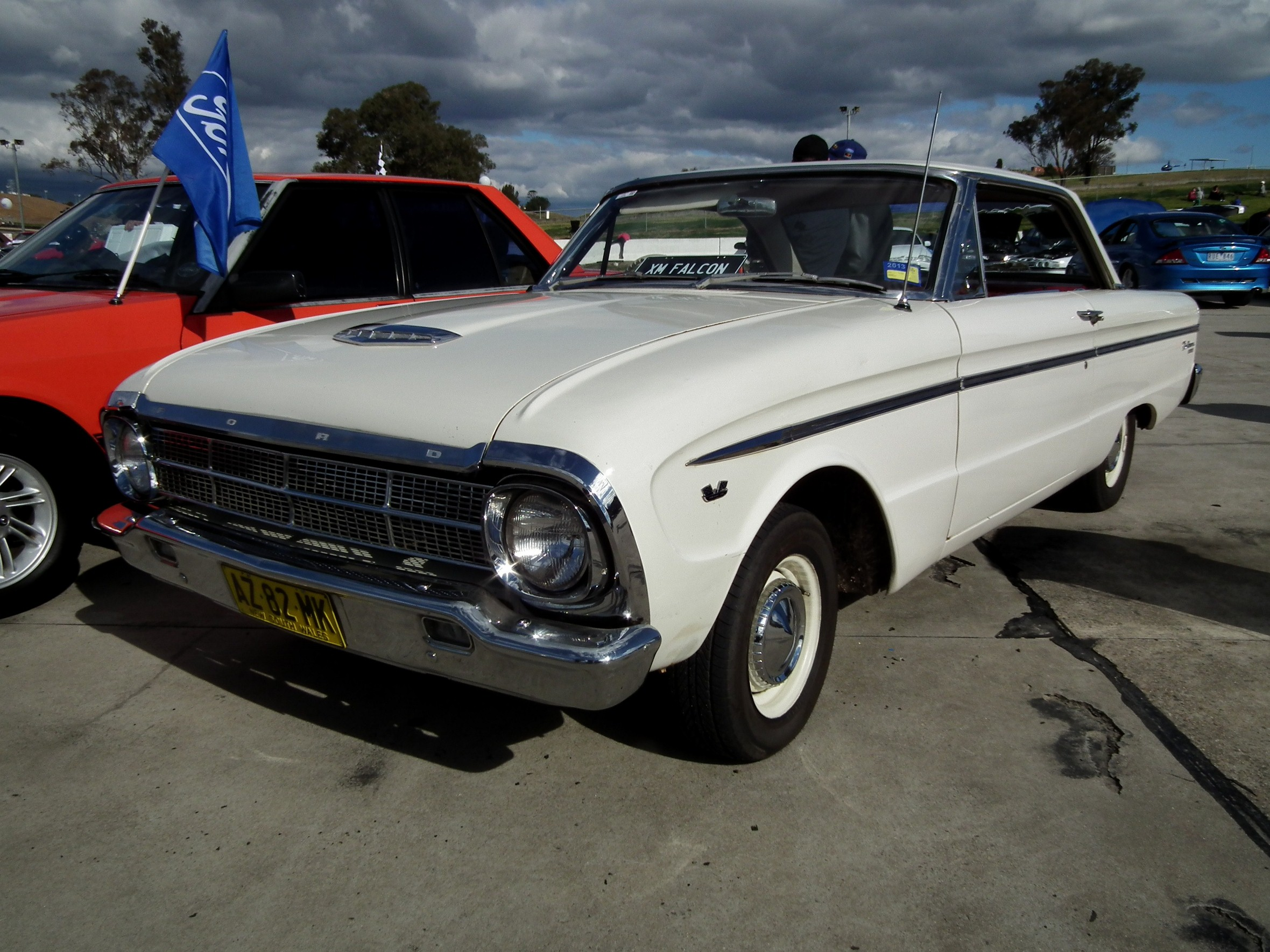
Ford XM Falcon Deluxe hardtop

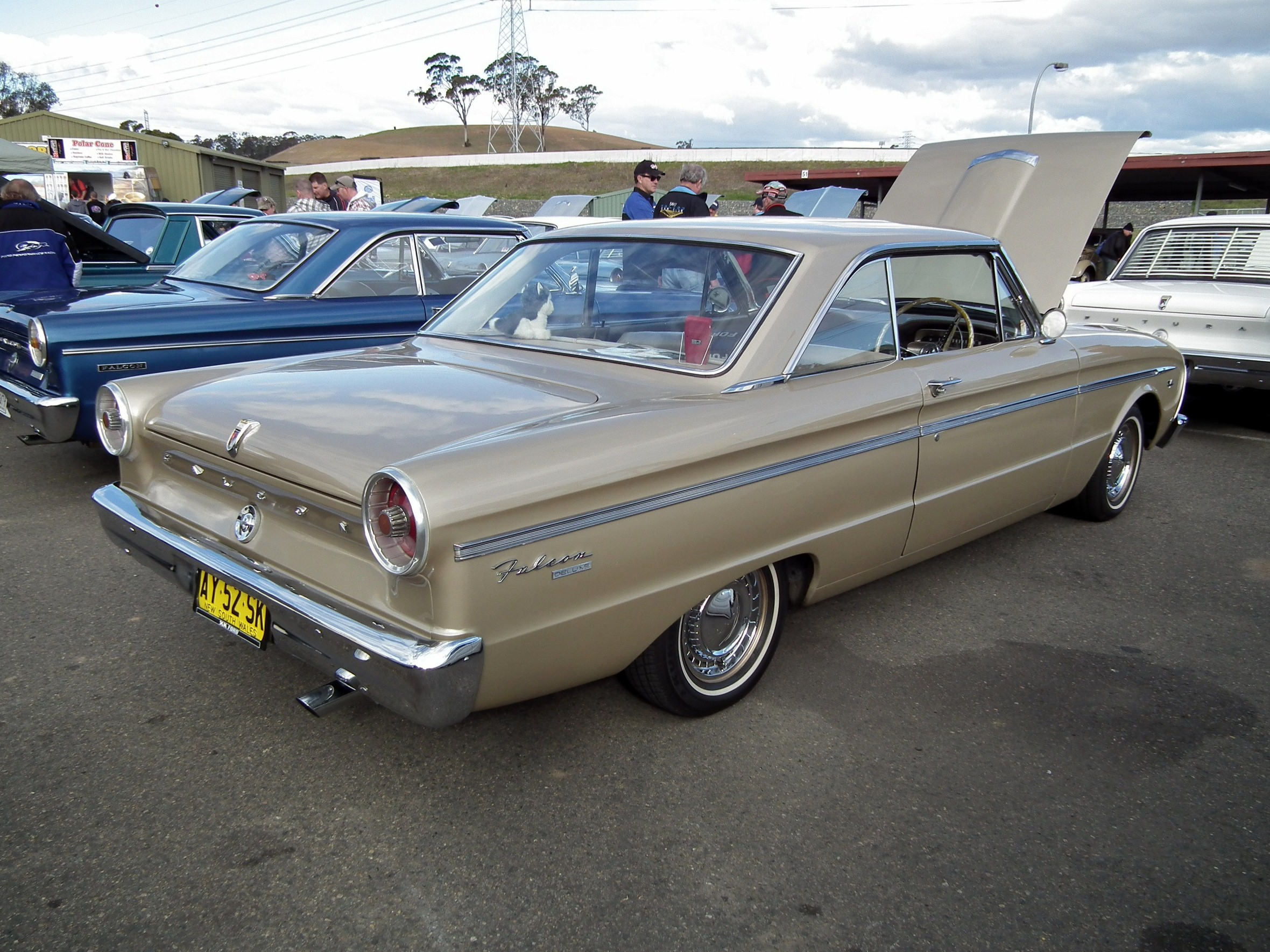
Ford XM Falcon Deluxe hardtop

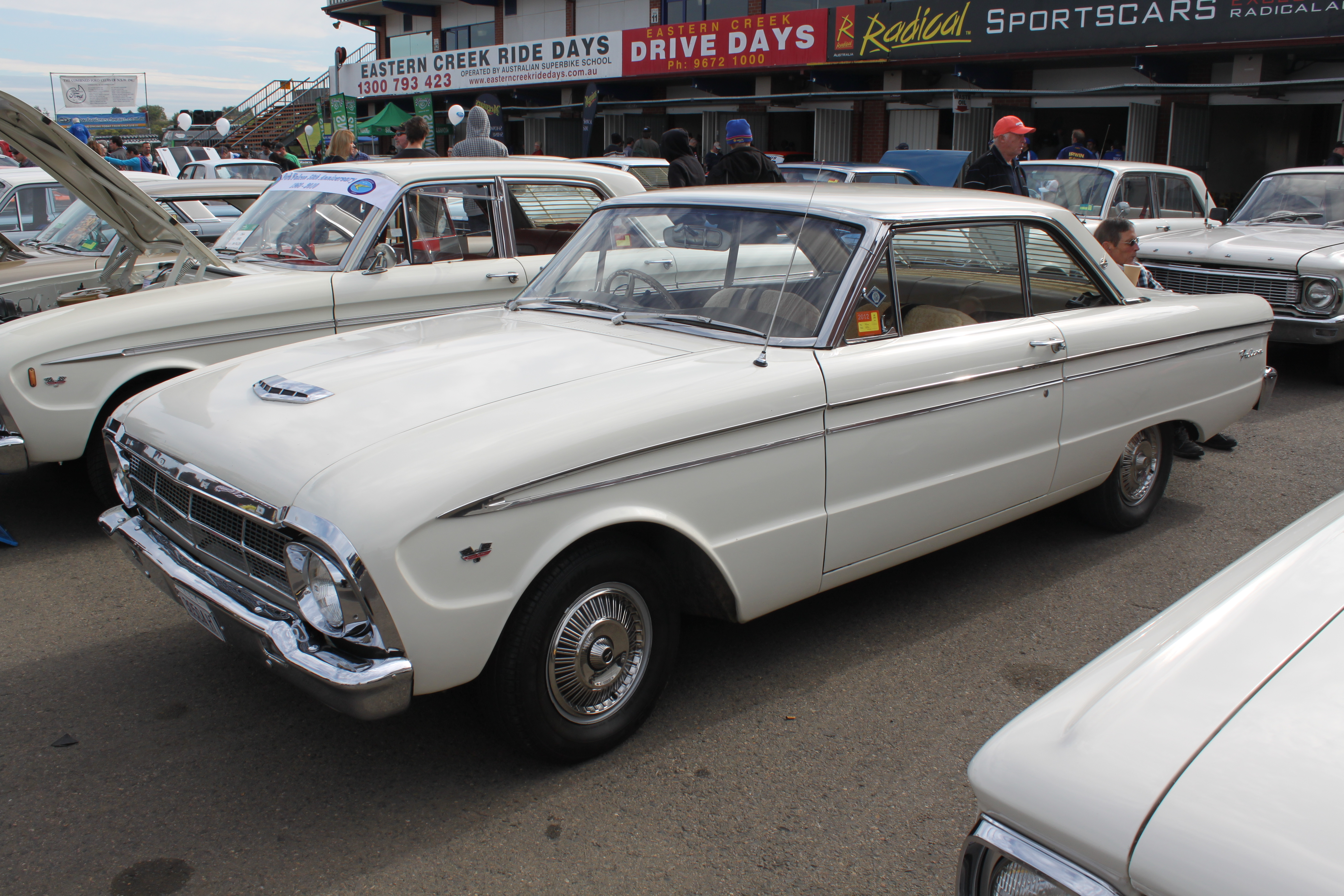
Ford XM Falcon Futura hardtop

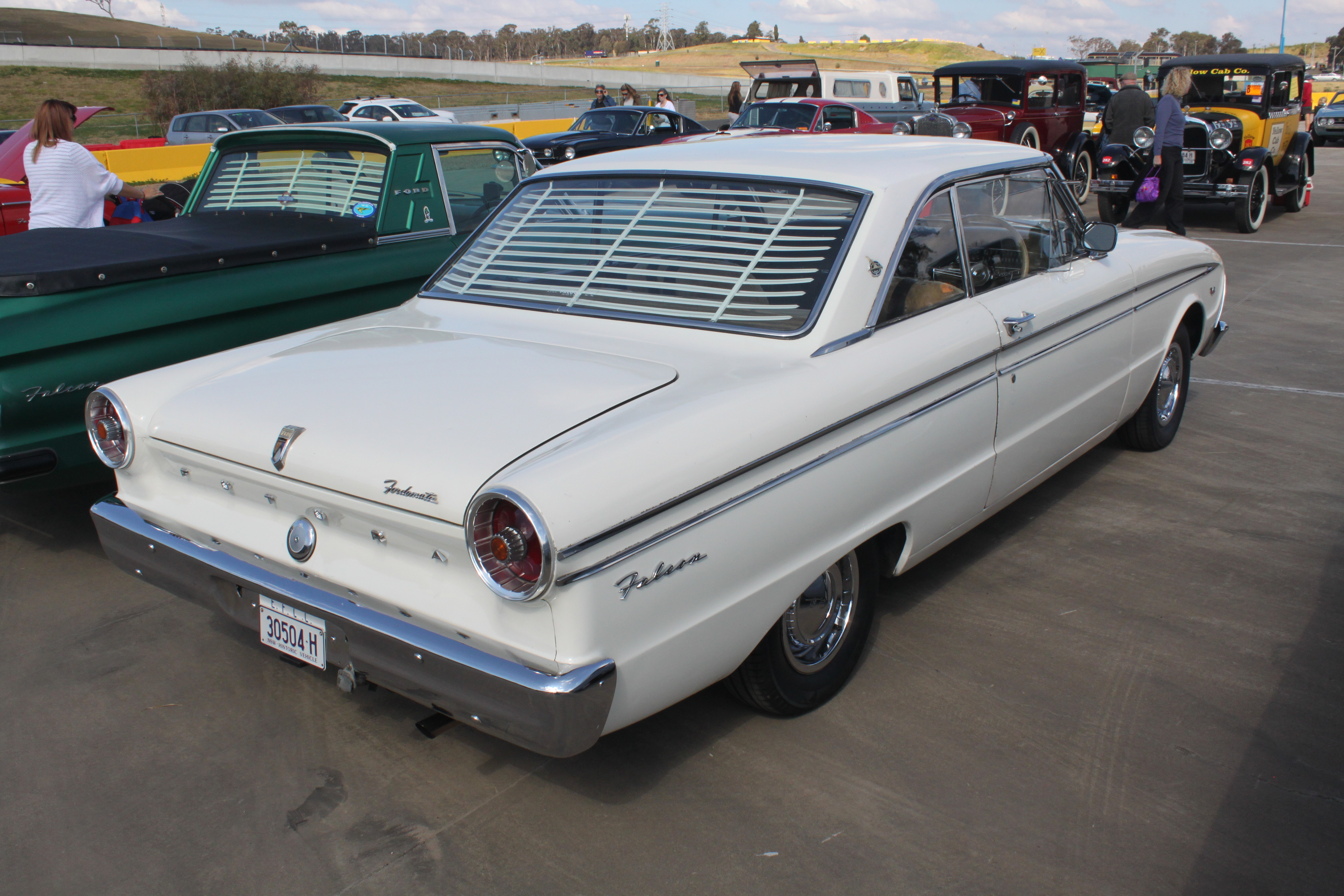
Ford XM Falcon Futura hardtop

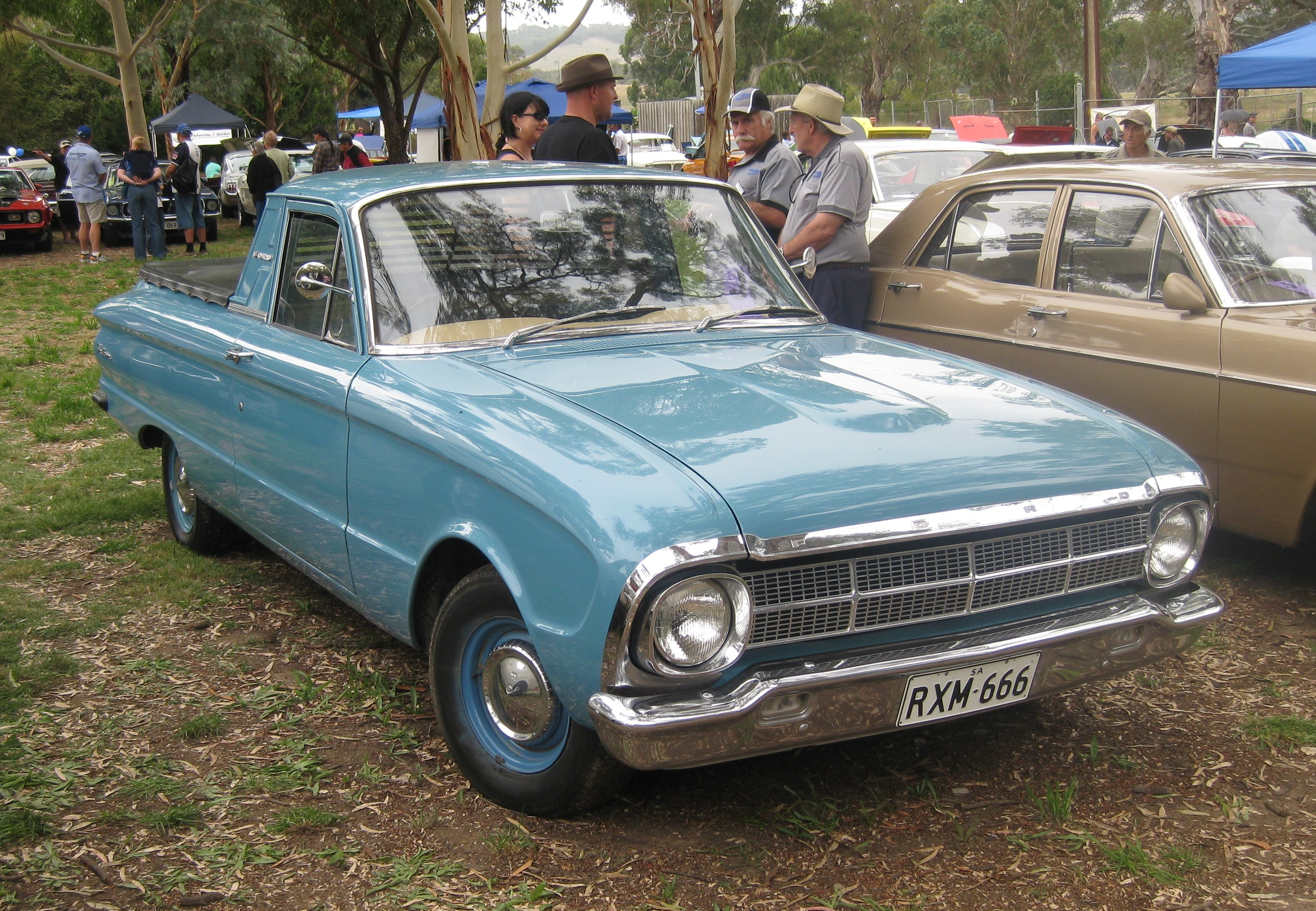
Ford XM Falcon utility

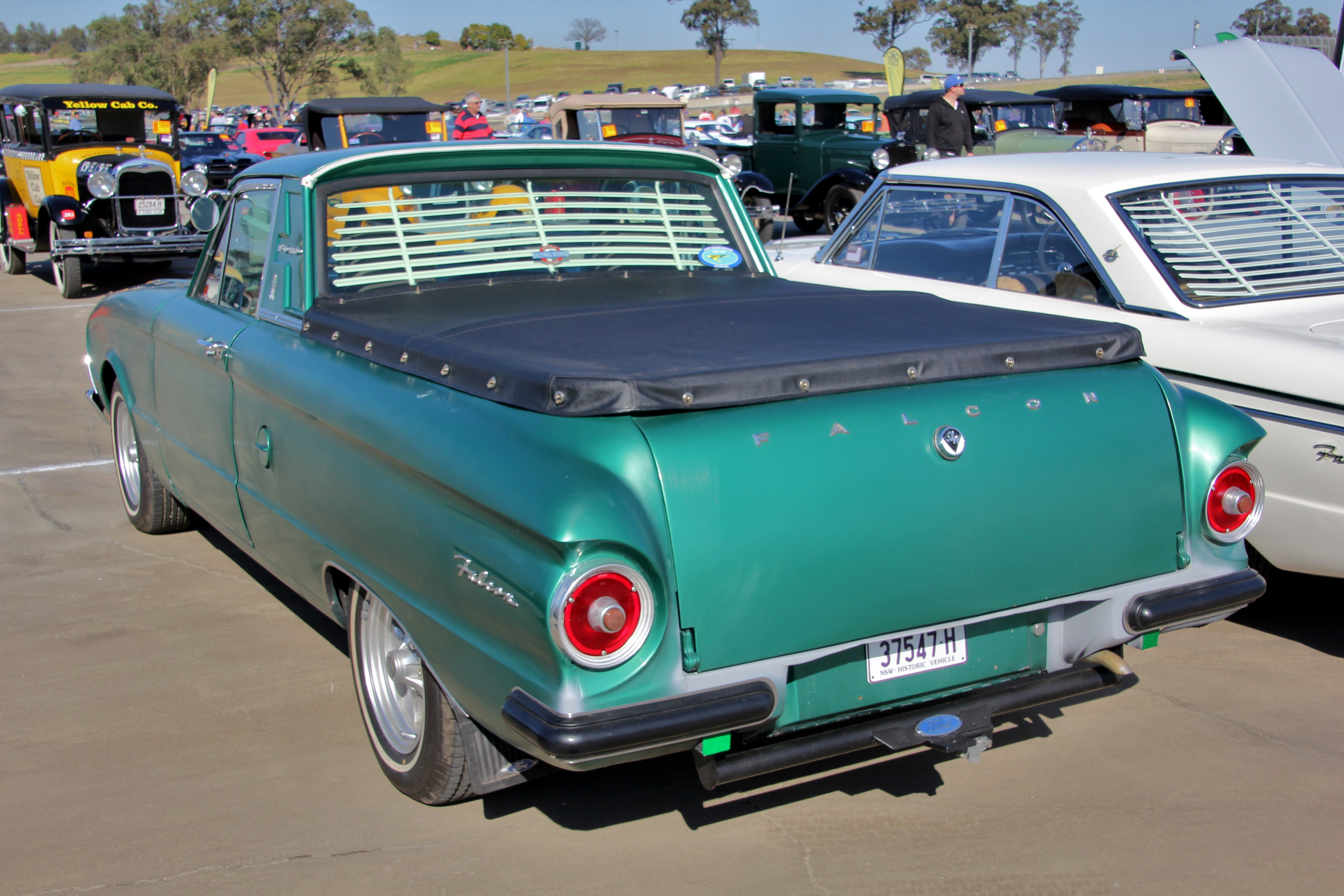
Ford XM Falcon utility

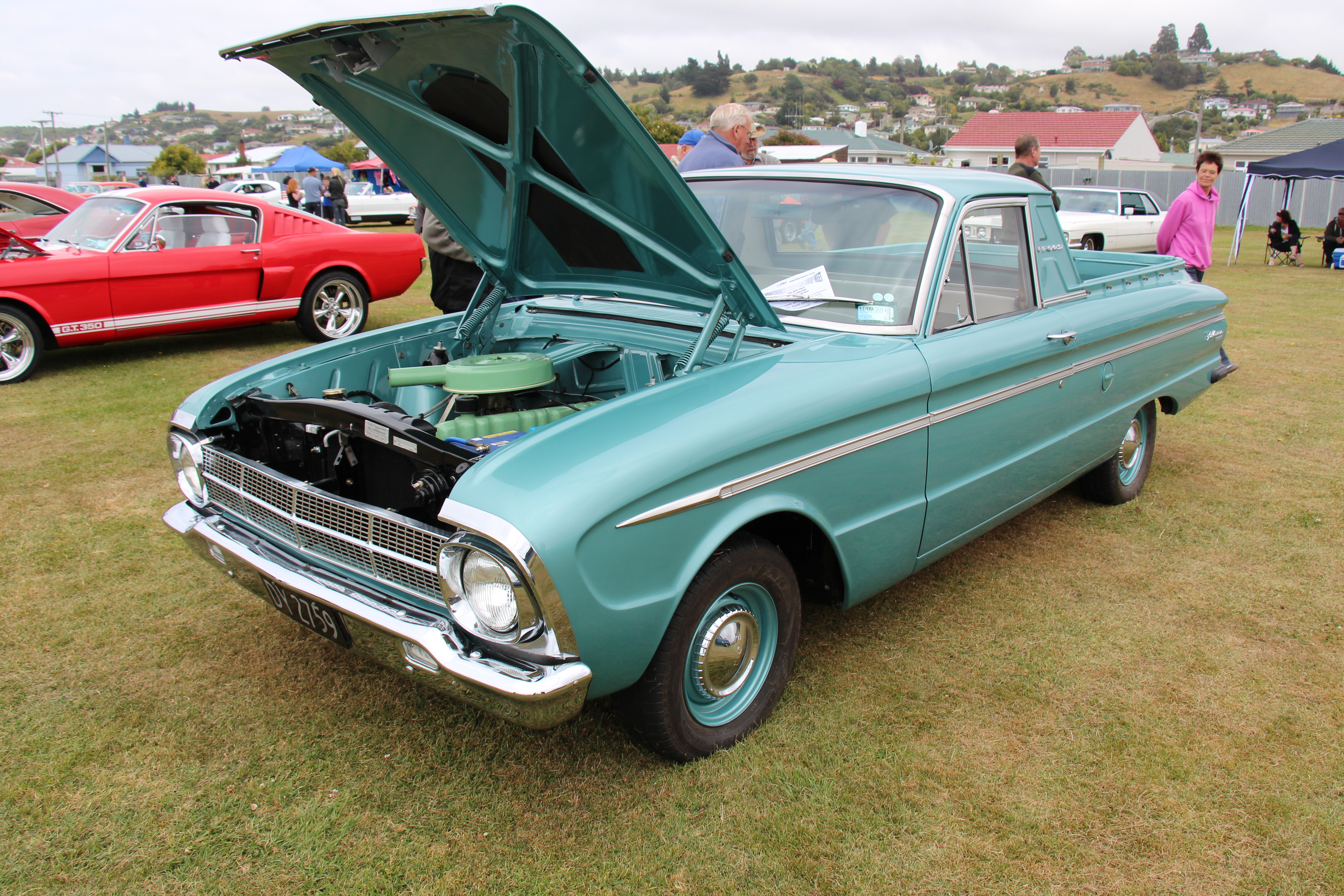
Ford XM Falcon Deluxe utility

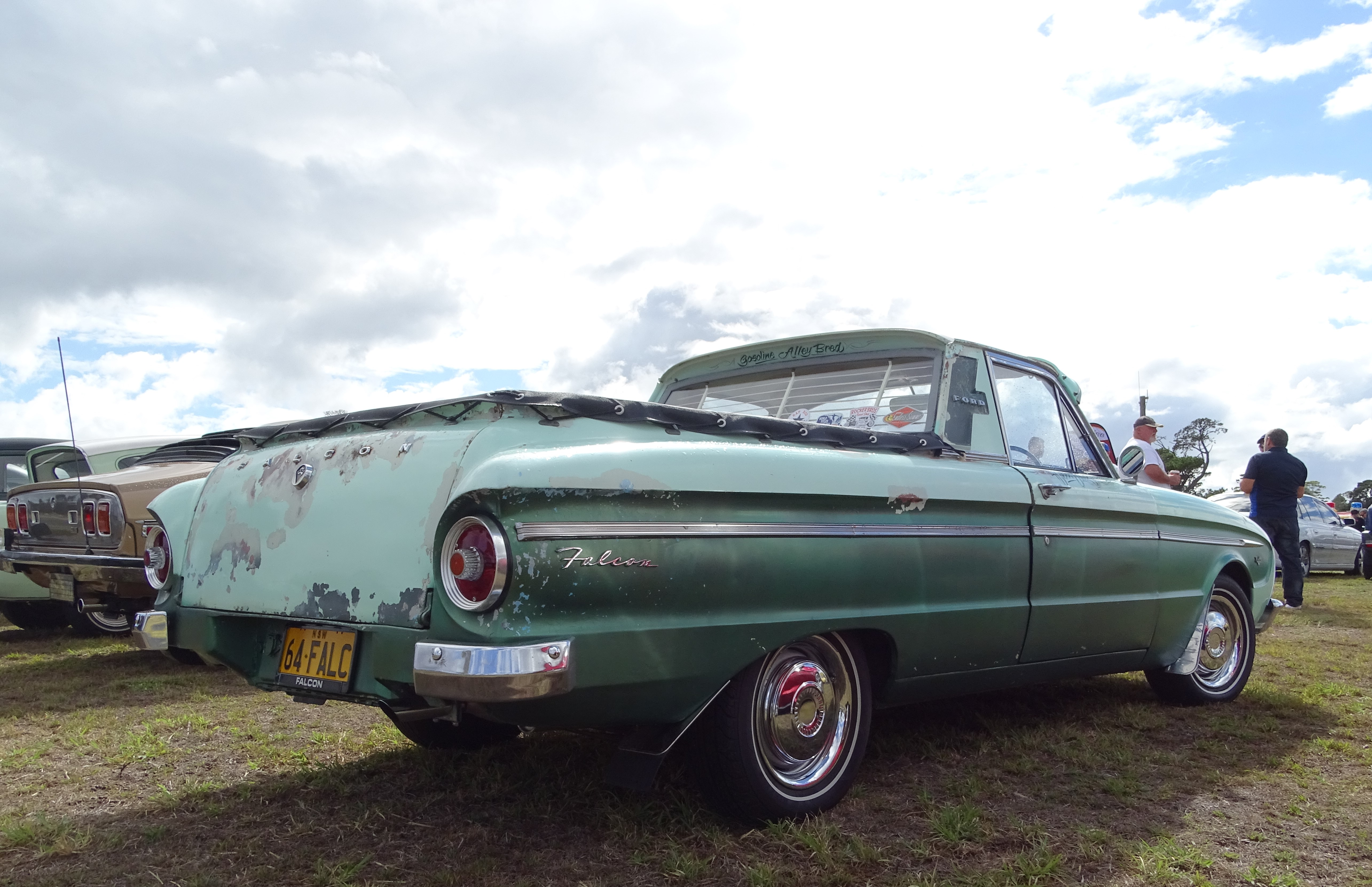
Ford XM Falcon Deluxe utility

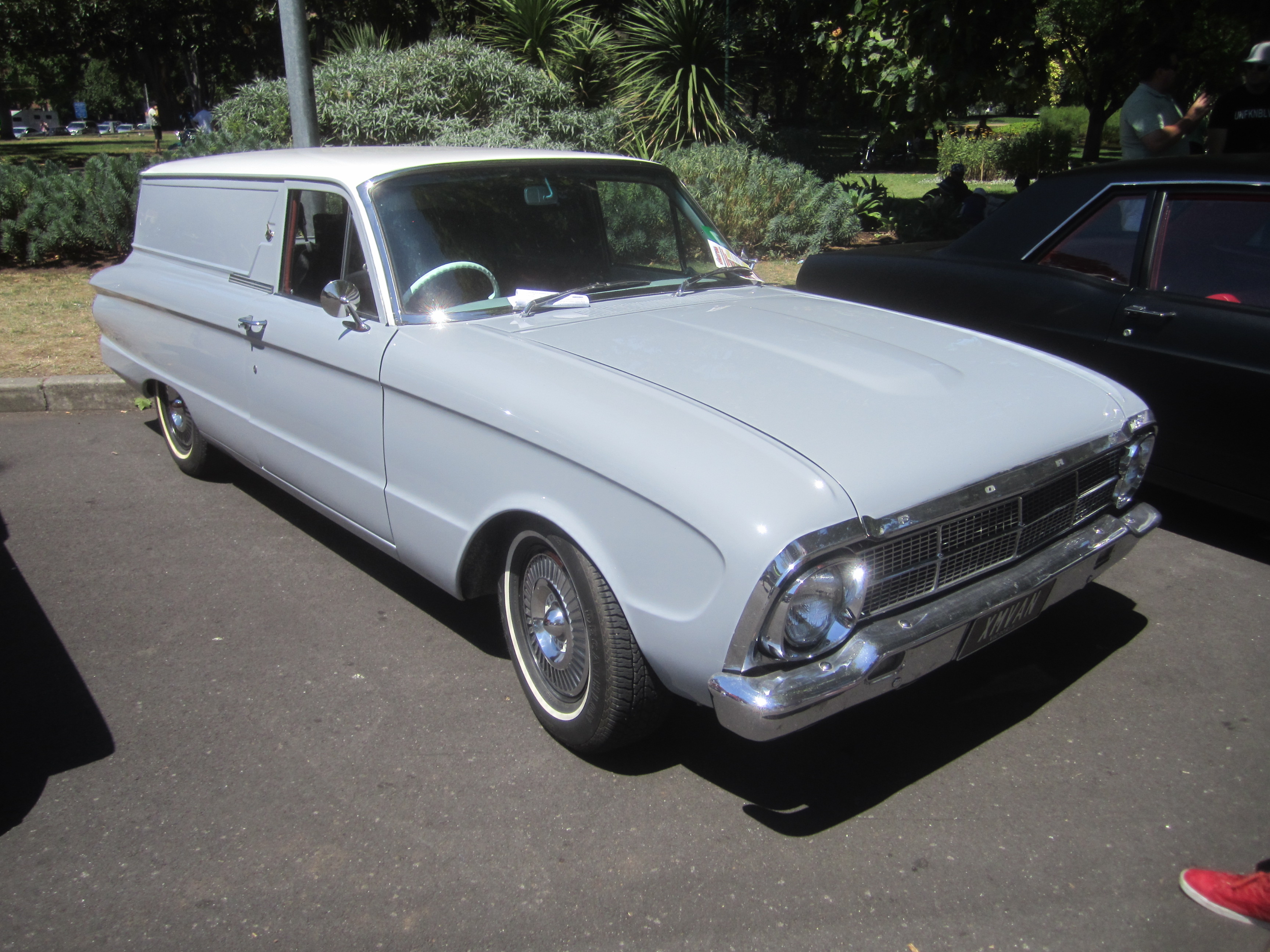
Ford XM Falcon sedan delivery

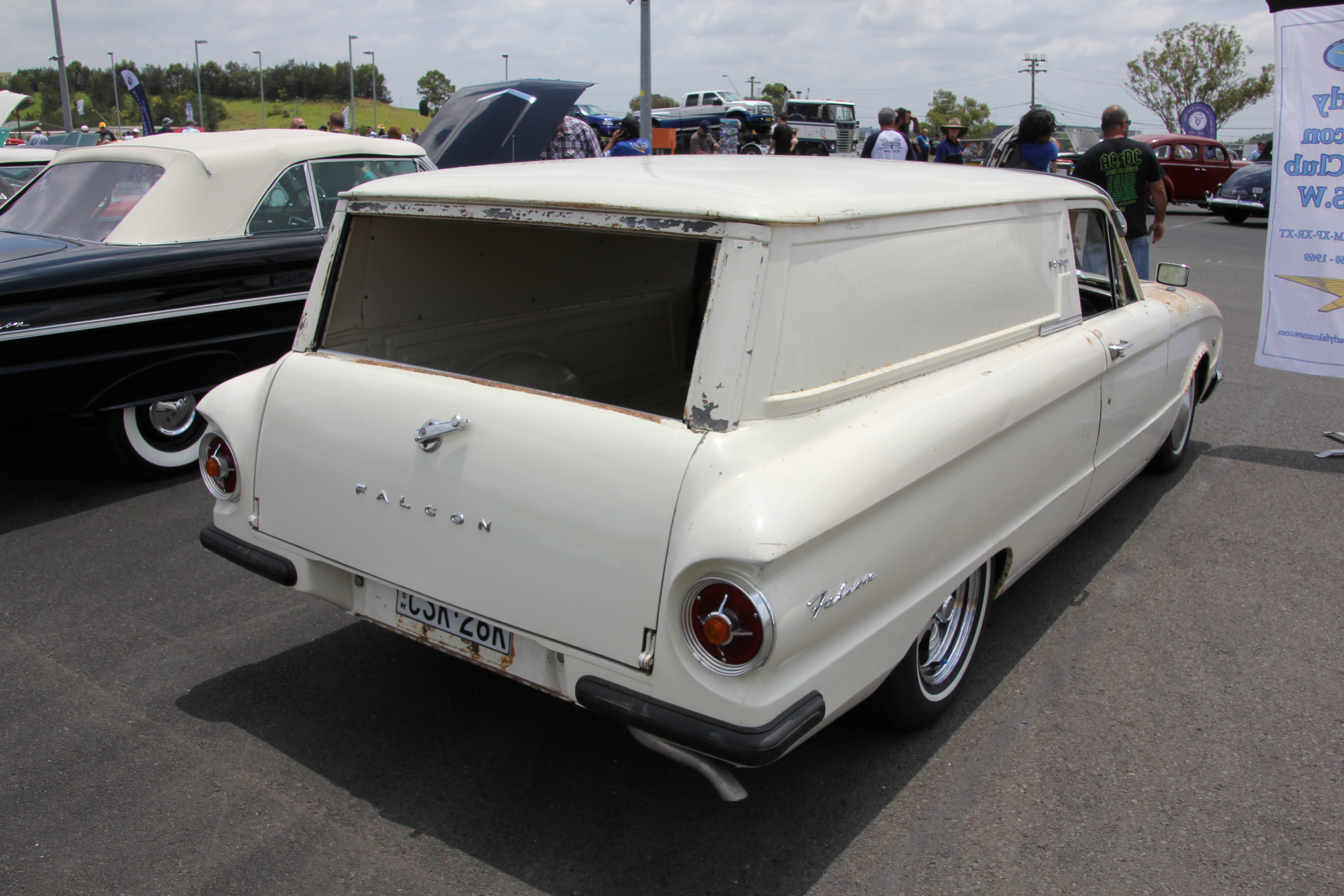
Ford XM Falcon sedan delivery

== Production ==
47,039 examples of the XM series were produced, prior to its replacement by the revised XP Falcon in March 1965.
