= Ford Falcon (XP) =

Australian full-size car

Ford XP Falcon
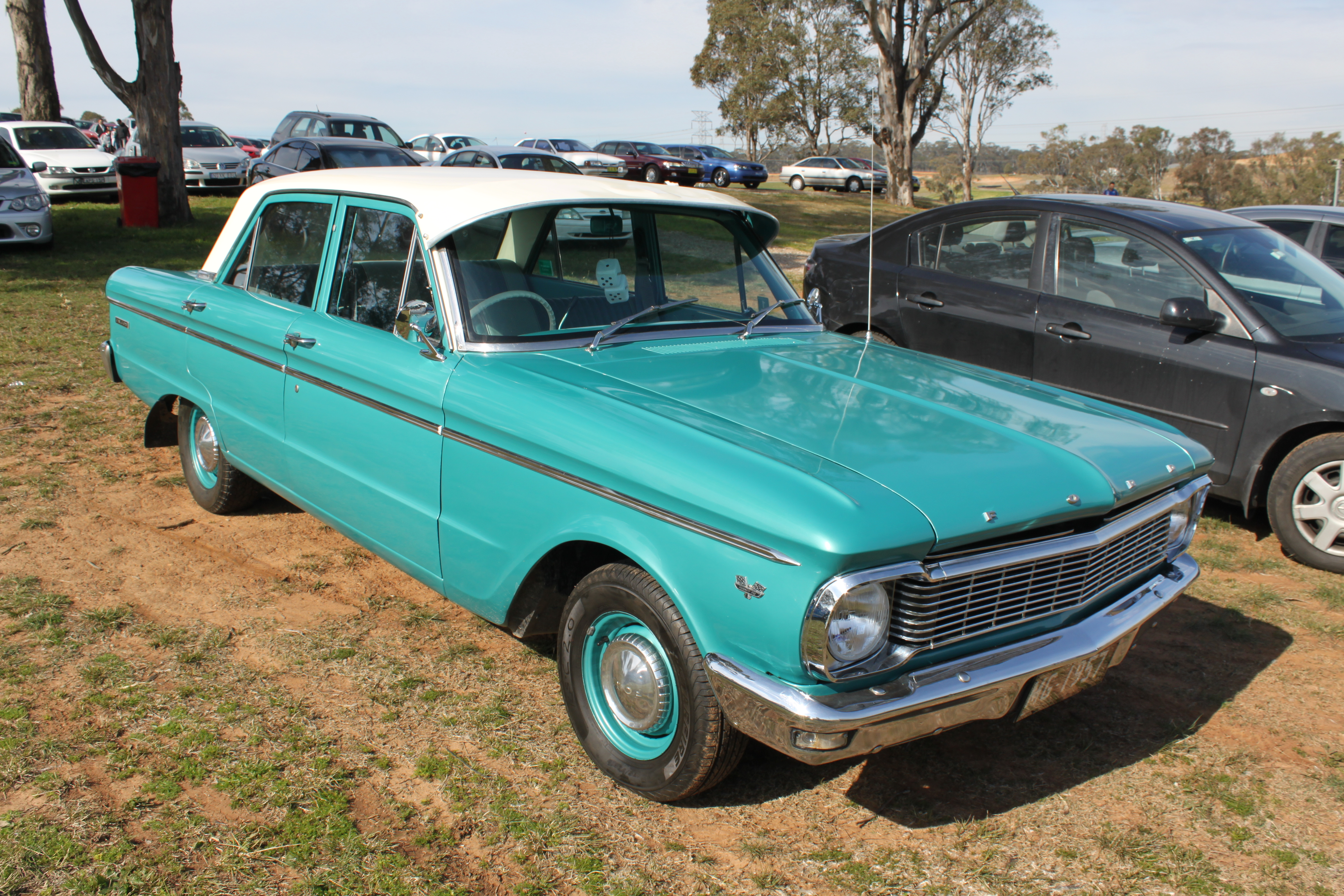
- Ford Falcon Deluxe Sedan

Overview
- Manufacturer: Ford Australia
- Also called: Ford XP Fairmont
- Production: March 1965 – September 1966

Body and chassis
- Class: Mid-size car
- Body style: 4 door sedan 4-door station wagon 2-door hardtop 2 door Utility (Ute); 2-door panel van
- Layout: Front engine, rear-wheel drive

Powertrain
- Engine: 144 ci (2.3L) Straight-6 OHV; 170 ci (2.8L) Straight-6 OHV; 200 ci (3.3 L) Straight-6 OHV
- Transmission: 3-speed manual 2-speed Ford-O-Matic automatic 3-speed automatic

Dimensions
- Wheelbase: 2,781 mm (109.5 in)
- Length: 4,658 mm (183.4 in)
- Width: 1,781 mm (70.1 in)
- Height: 1,420 mm (55.9 in)
- Kerb weight: 1,175 kg (2,590.4 lb)

Chronology
- Predecessor: Ford XM Falcon
- Successor: Ford XR Falcon

The Ford Falcon (XP) is a mid-sized car produced by Ford Australia from 1965 to 1966. It was the fourth and last iteration of the first generation of the Falcon, and also included the Ford Fairmont (XP), the luxury-oriented version.

== Introduction ==
The XP Falcon was introduced in March 1965, replacing the XM Falcon which had been in production since 1964. It was the final series of the first-generation Falcon which had been introduced as the XK Falcon in 1960. The main change from the XM was the 'torque box' steel subframe which added structural rigidity to the car. This was a key in improving the public perception of the car, as the early models were considered flimsy and were unpopular with Australian fleet buyers.

The running gear and most other components stayed the same from the XM through to the XP. All of the utility, panel van, taxi and police vehicles had five-Stud 13-inch wheels and larger 10-inch drum brakes, as had all previous commercial models. Commercials had always had lower-ratio differentials (4.00:1) and larger 6.70 x 13 tyres.

The up market Fairmonts, which were released by Ford Australia as a means of competing with Holdens Premier came with 14-inch four-stud wheels to accommodate the standard disc brakes on this model, whereas other models had 13-inch wheels if disc brakes were not optioned. Both Fairmonts and Futuras (including Futura hardtops) featured bucket seats, however only the Futura models had a center console,

The 200 ci Super Pursuit engine initially in four-main bearing form and finally with the imported seven-main bearing unit, three-speed automatic transmission, and a padded dash along with carpets, perforated, colour-matched headlining, blower heater, screen washers, chrome-plated interior mirror, seven interior door-operated lights, and a handbrake on warning light flasher as standard. Vacuum-assisted disc brakes were standard in the Fairmont only and optional on other sedan and hardtop models.

The XP Falcon shared the same front panels (bonnet, front guards and front bumper bar) as the 1960-63 Mercury Comet along with a Ford Australia designed grille, the XP being a single headlight car whilst the Comet having twin headlights .

== Model range ==
The XP Falcon passenger car range was initially offered in four-door sedan, two-door hardtop, and five-door station wagon body styles marketed as:

- Falcon Standard Sedan
- Falcon Standard Wagon
- Falcon Deluxe Sedan
- Falcon Deluxe Hardtop
- Falcon Deluxe Wagon
- Falcon Futura Sedan
- Falcon Futura Hardtop
- Falcon Squire Wagon

In September 1965, the Falcon Futura Sedan and Falcon Squire Wagon were replaced by two new Fairmont models marketed as:

- Fairmont Sedan
- Fairmont Wagon

The XP Falcon commercial vehicles range was offered in two-door coupe utility and two-door panel van body styles marketed as:

- Falcon Standard Utility
- Falcon Deluxe Utility
- Falcon Sedan Delivery
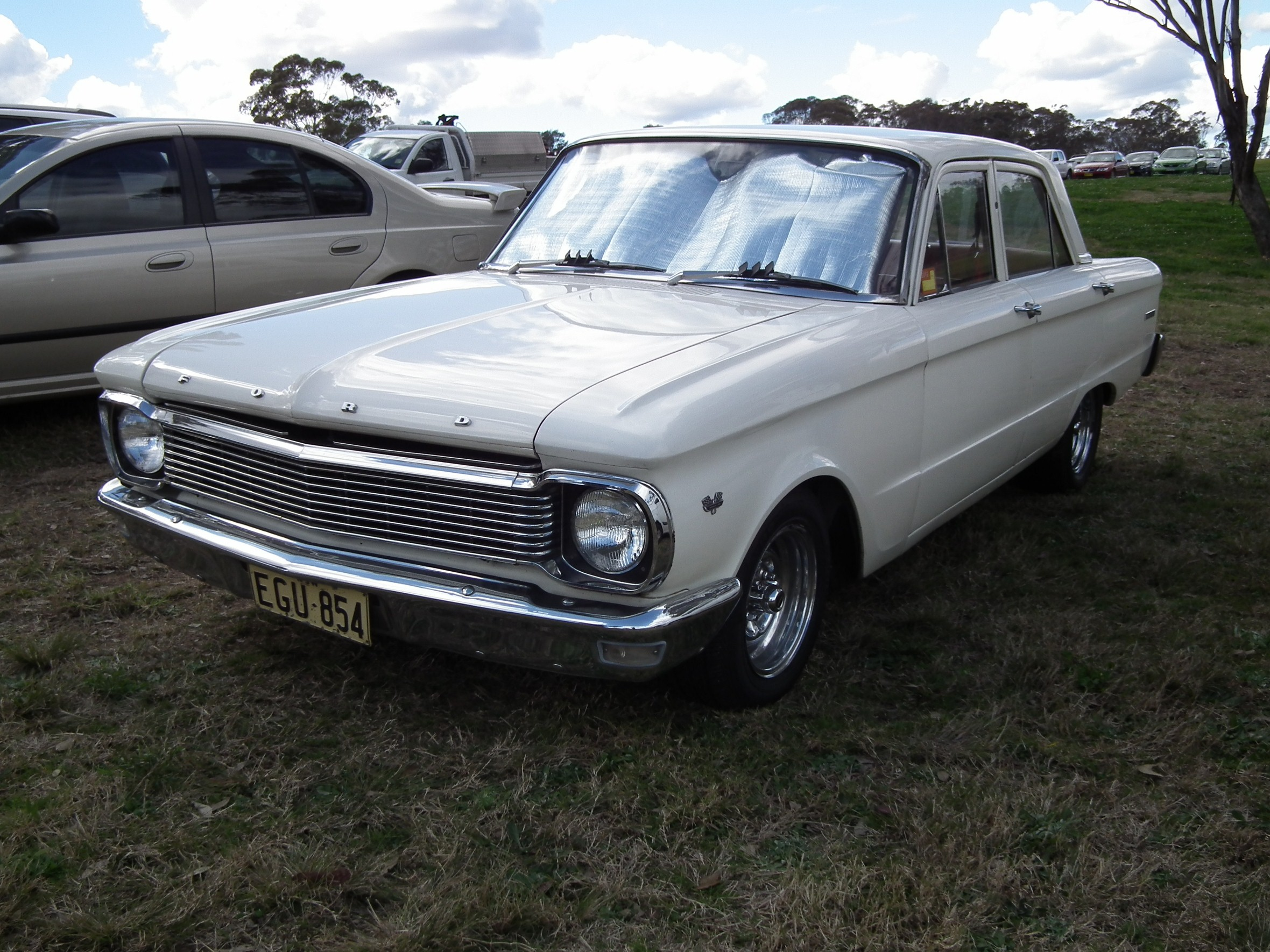
Ford XP Falcon sedan

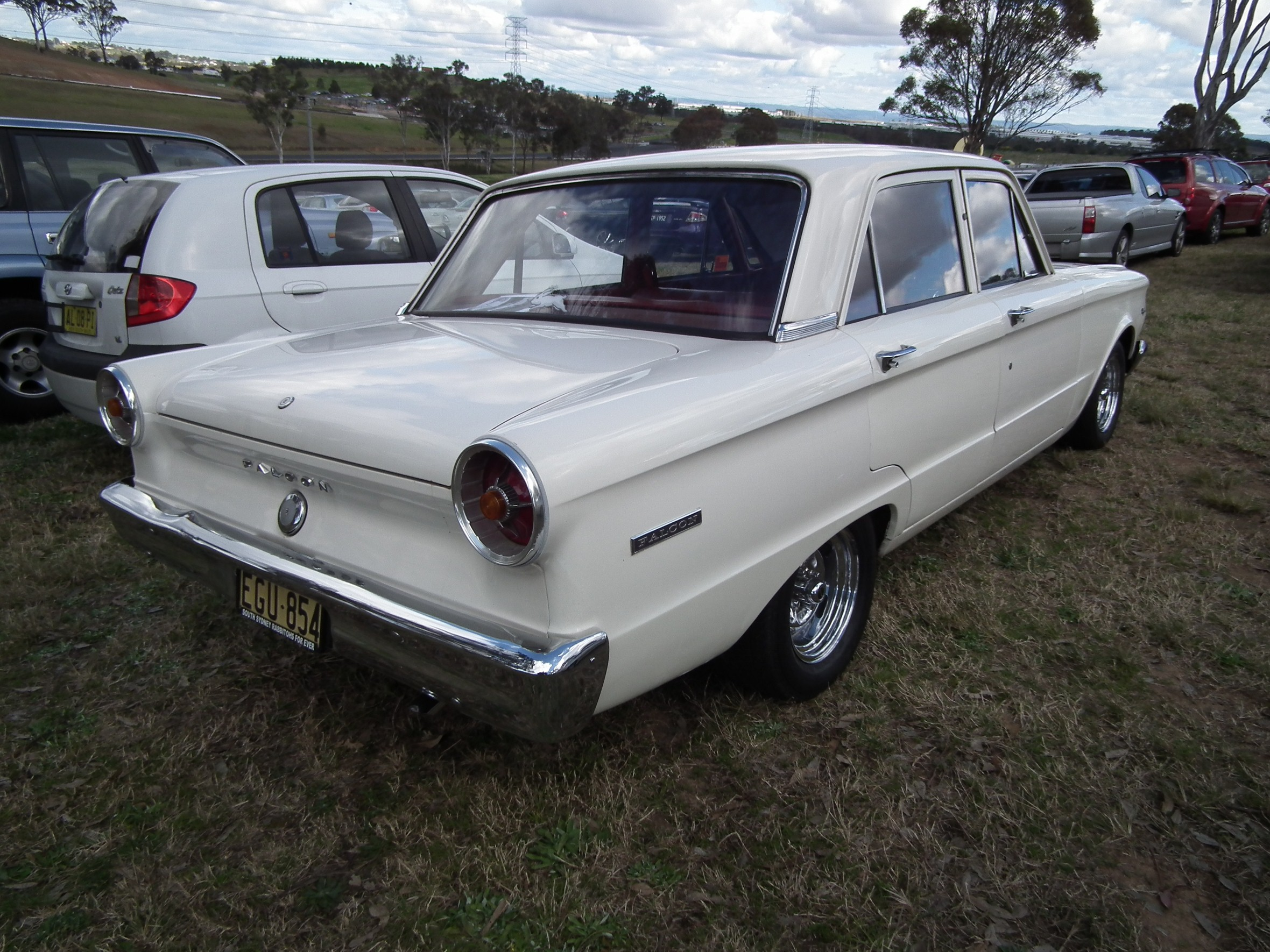
Ford XP Falcon sedan

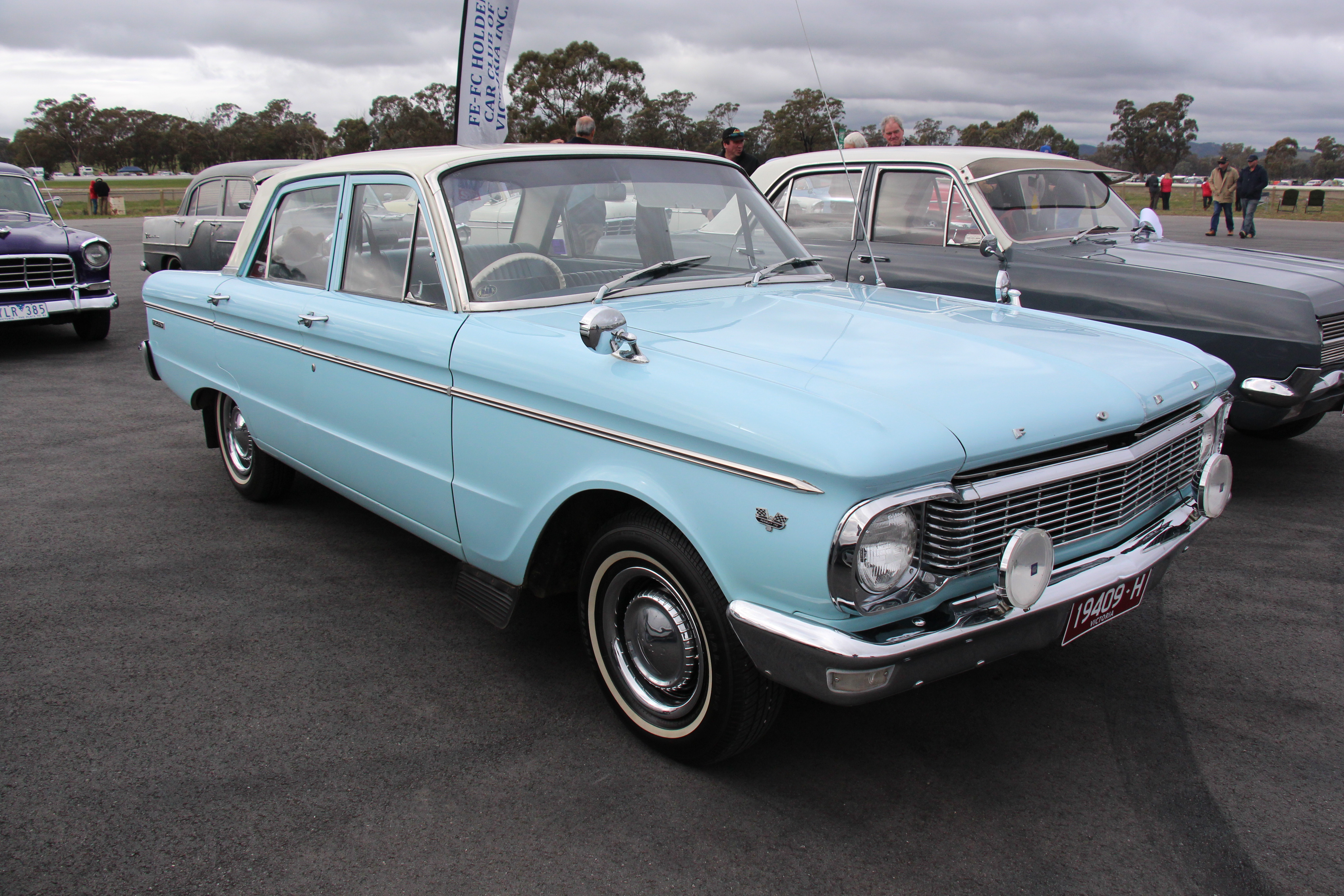
Ford XP Falcon Deluxe sedan

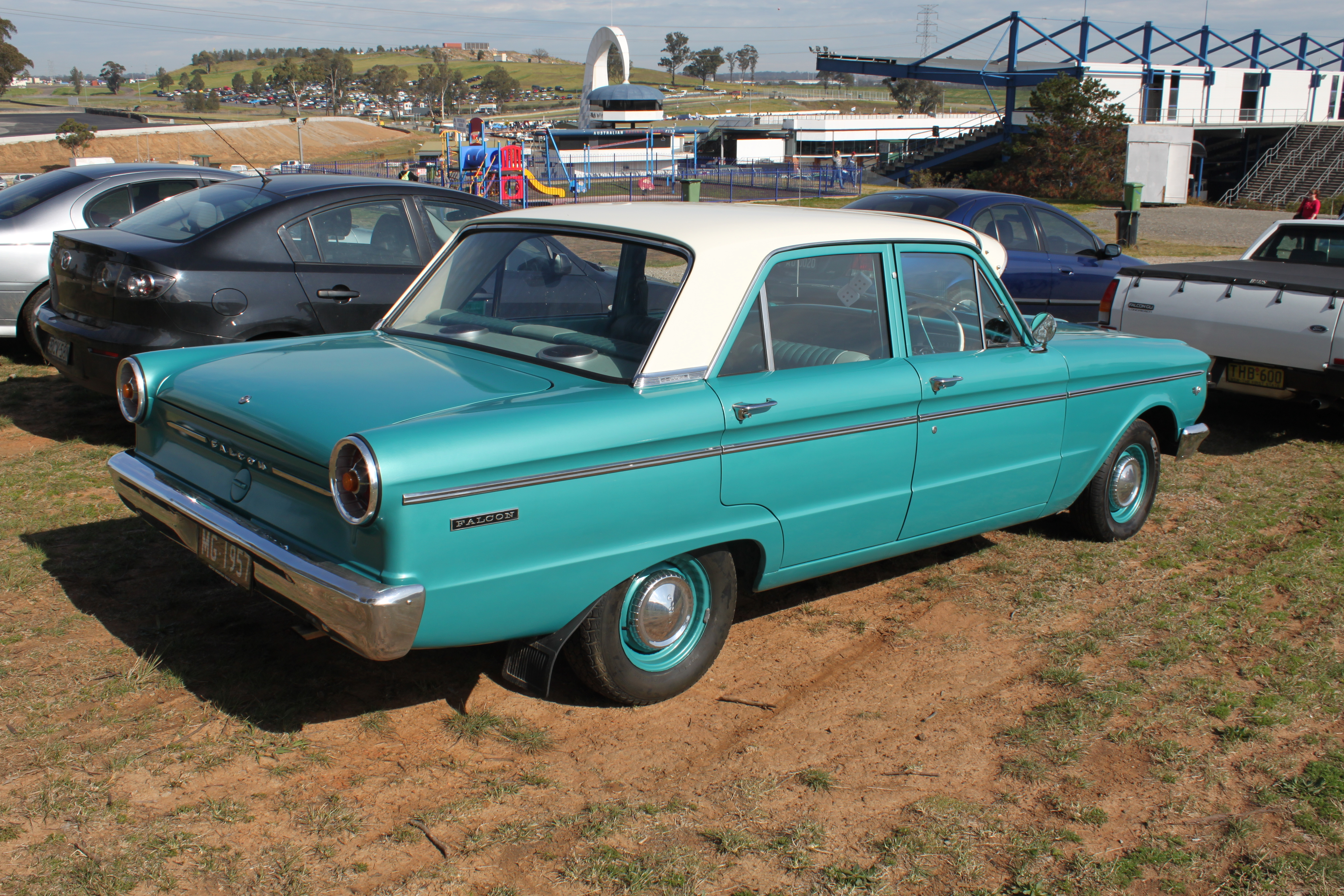
Ford XP Falcon Deluxe sedan

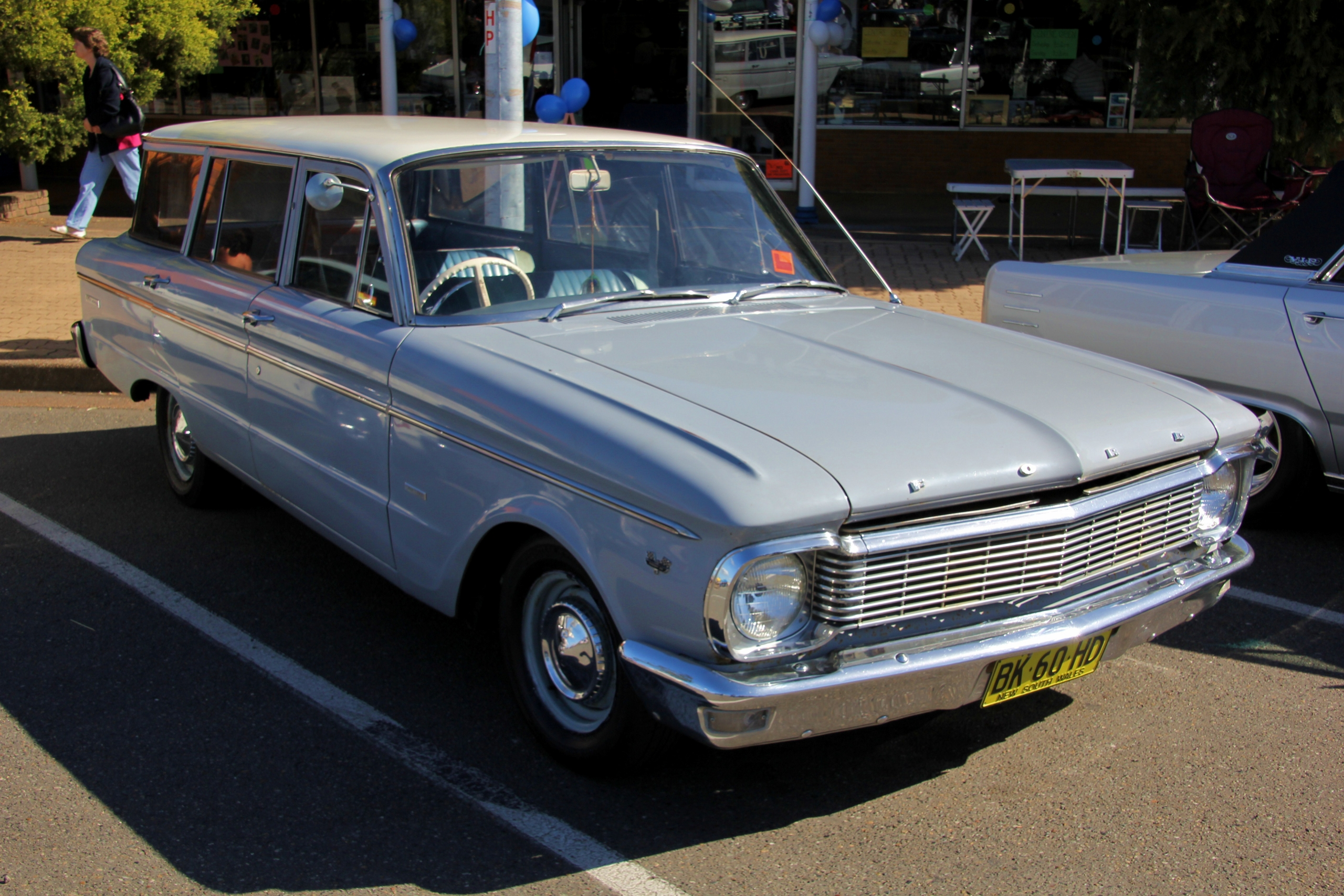
Ford XP Falcon Deluxe wagon

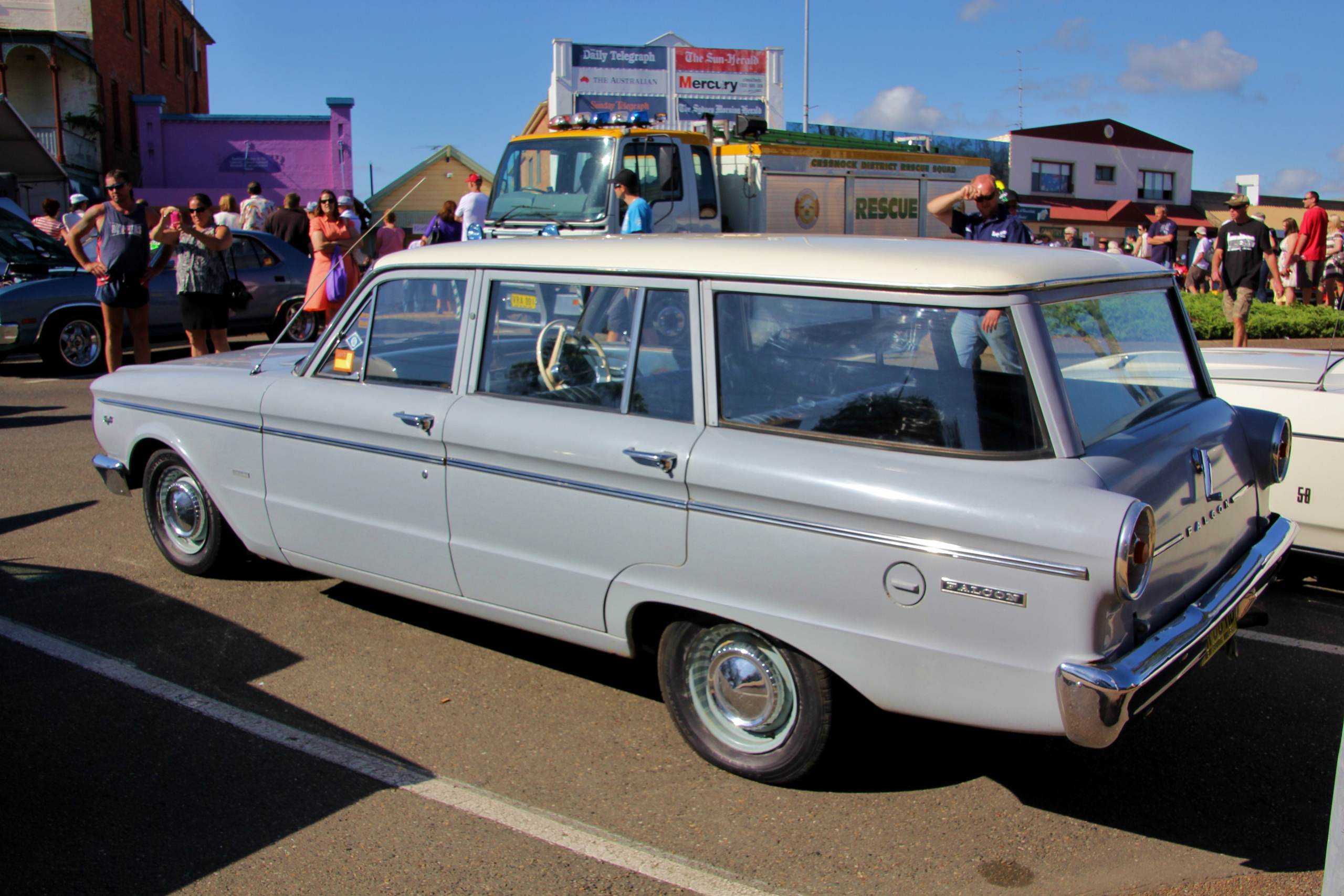
Ford XP Falcon Deluxe wagon

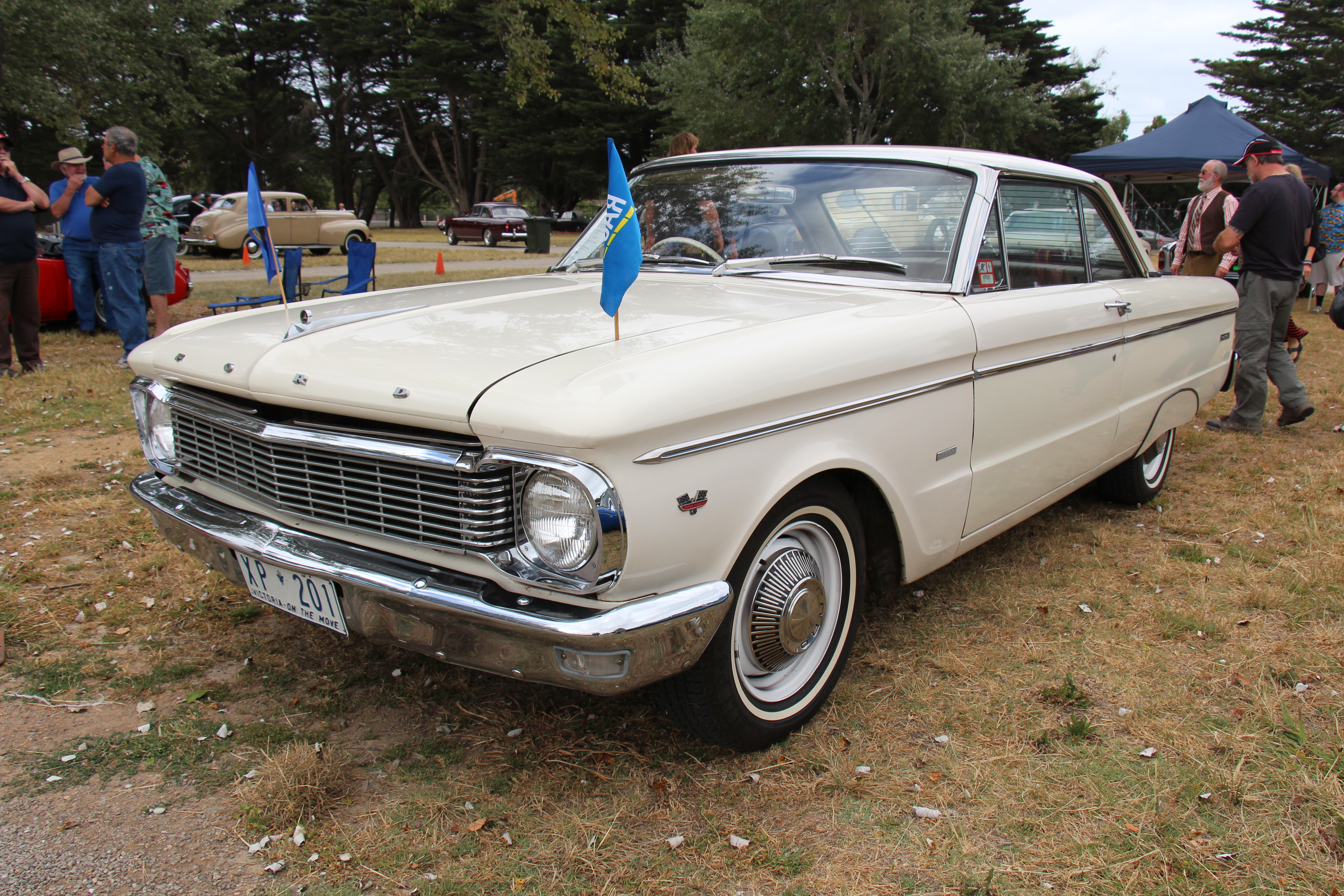
Ford XP Falcon Deluxe hardtop

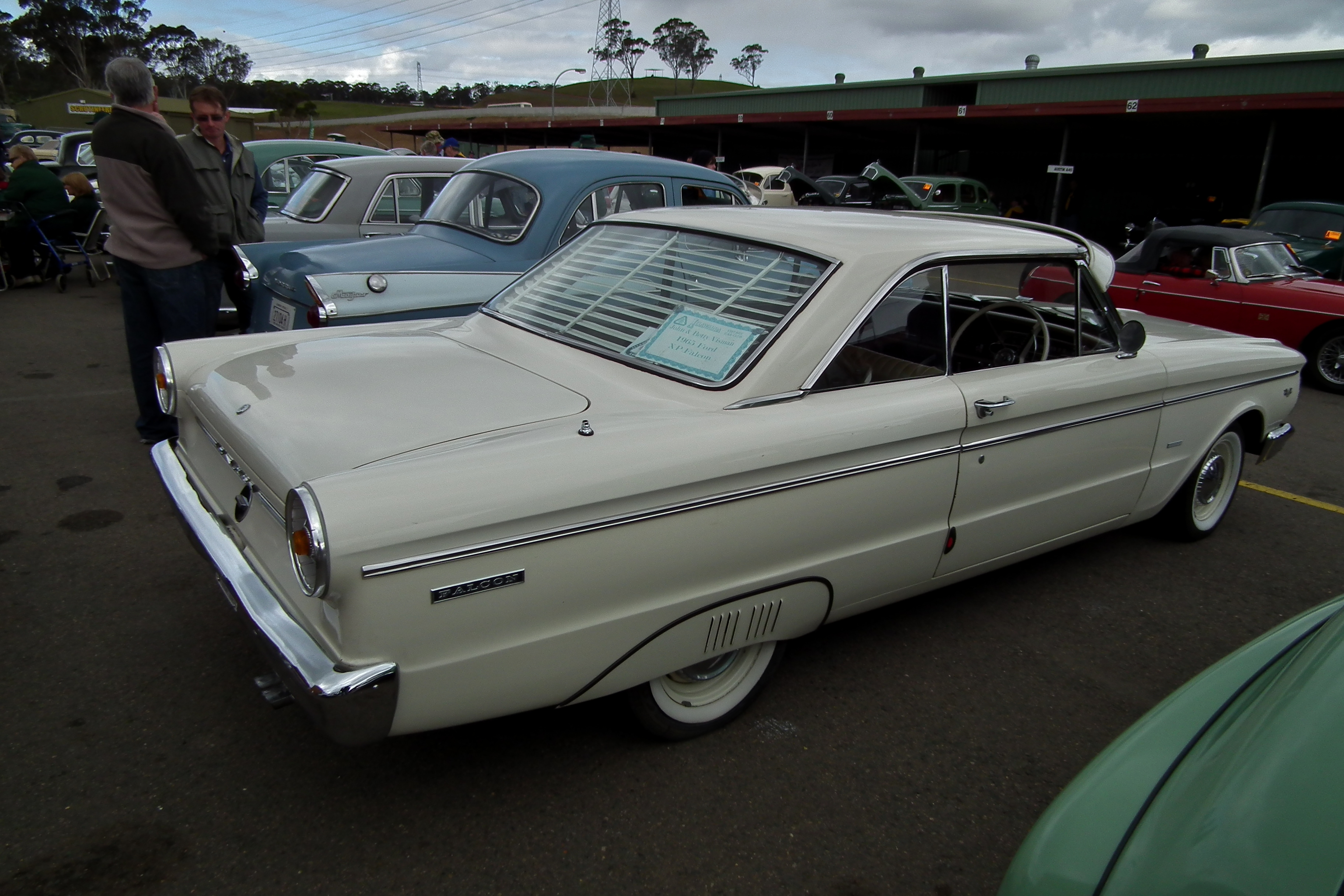
Ford XP Falcon Deluxe hardtop

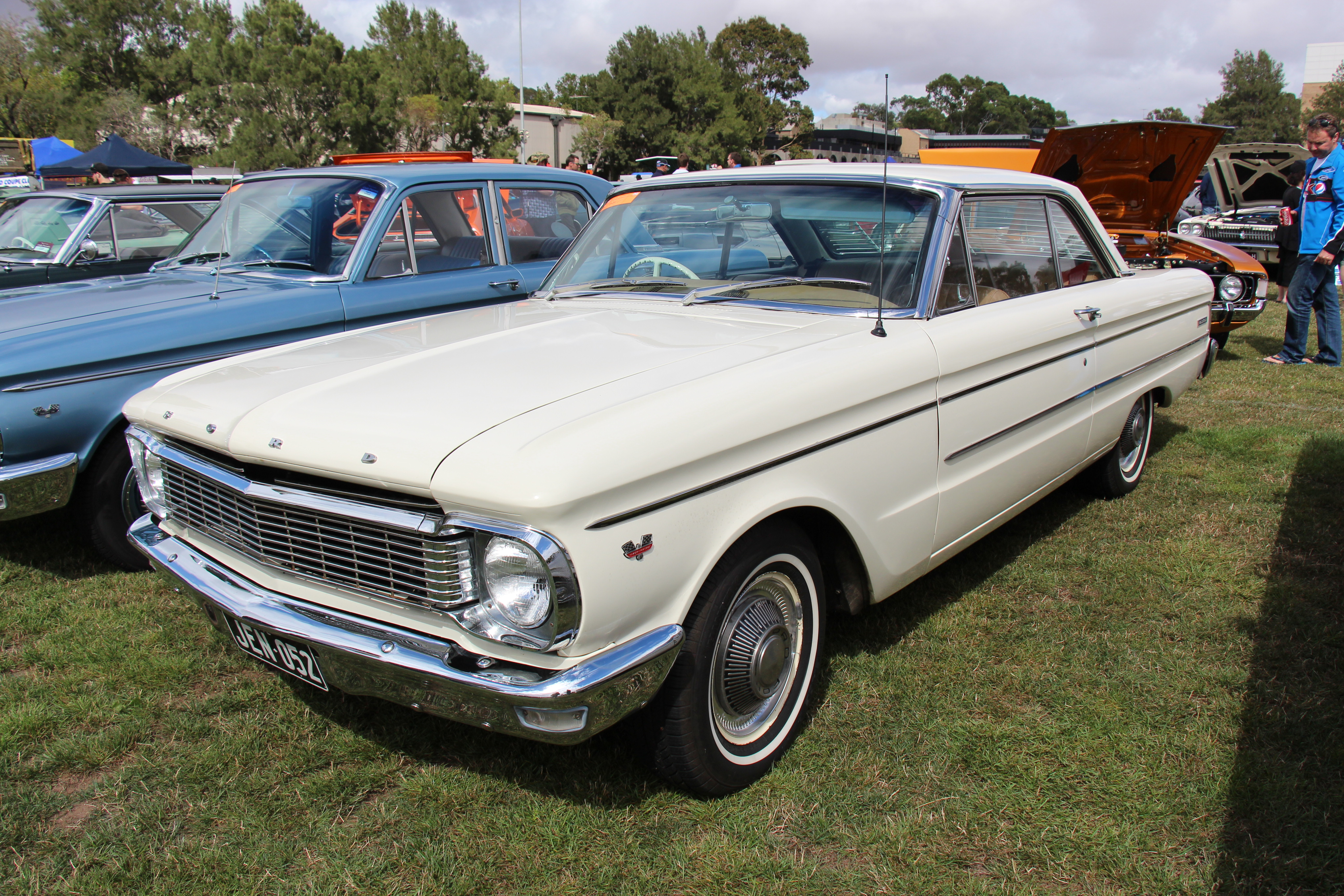
Ford XP Falcon Futura hardtop

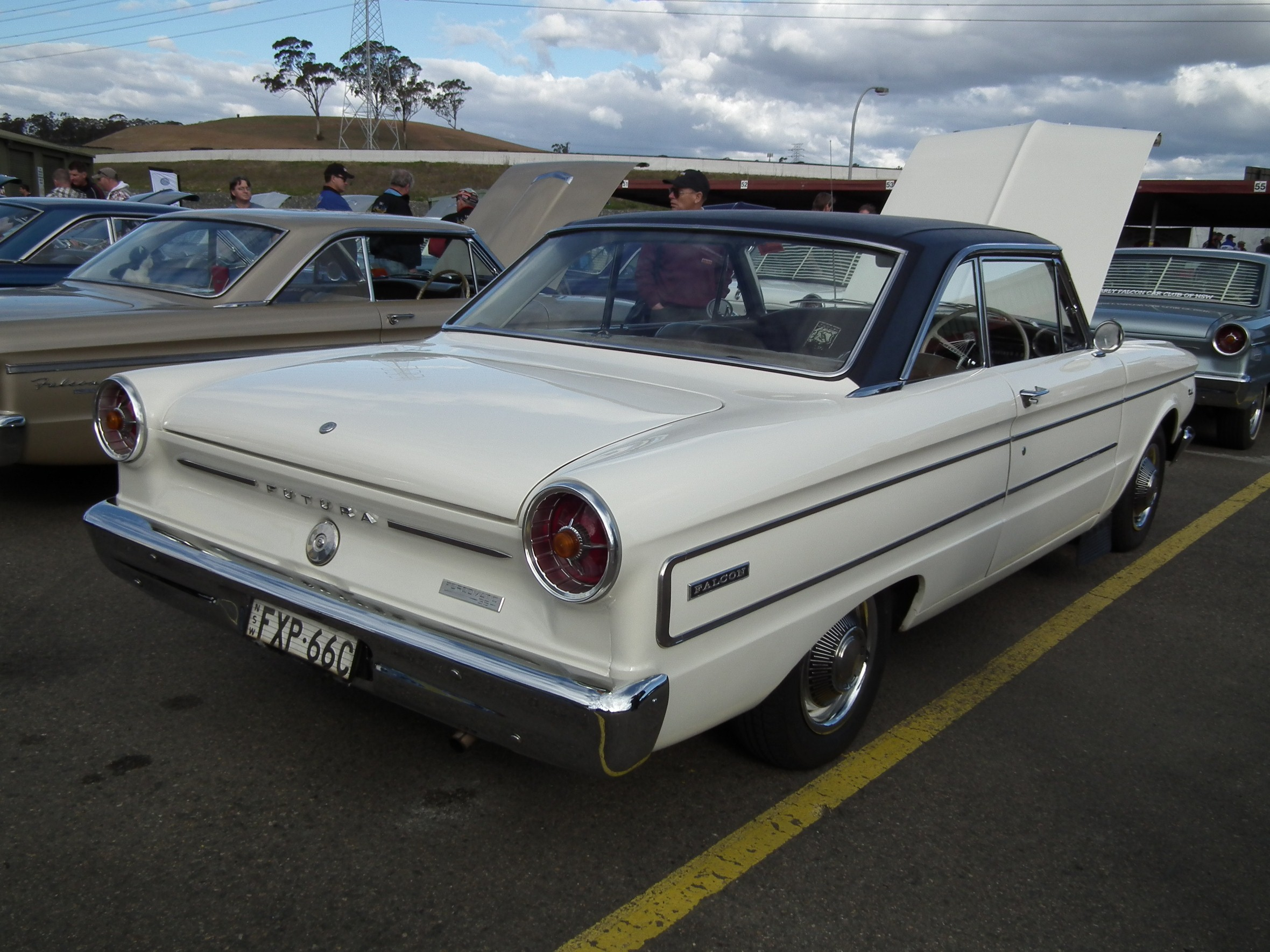
Ford XP Falcon Futura hardtop

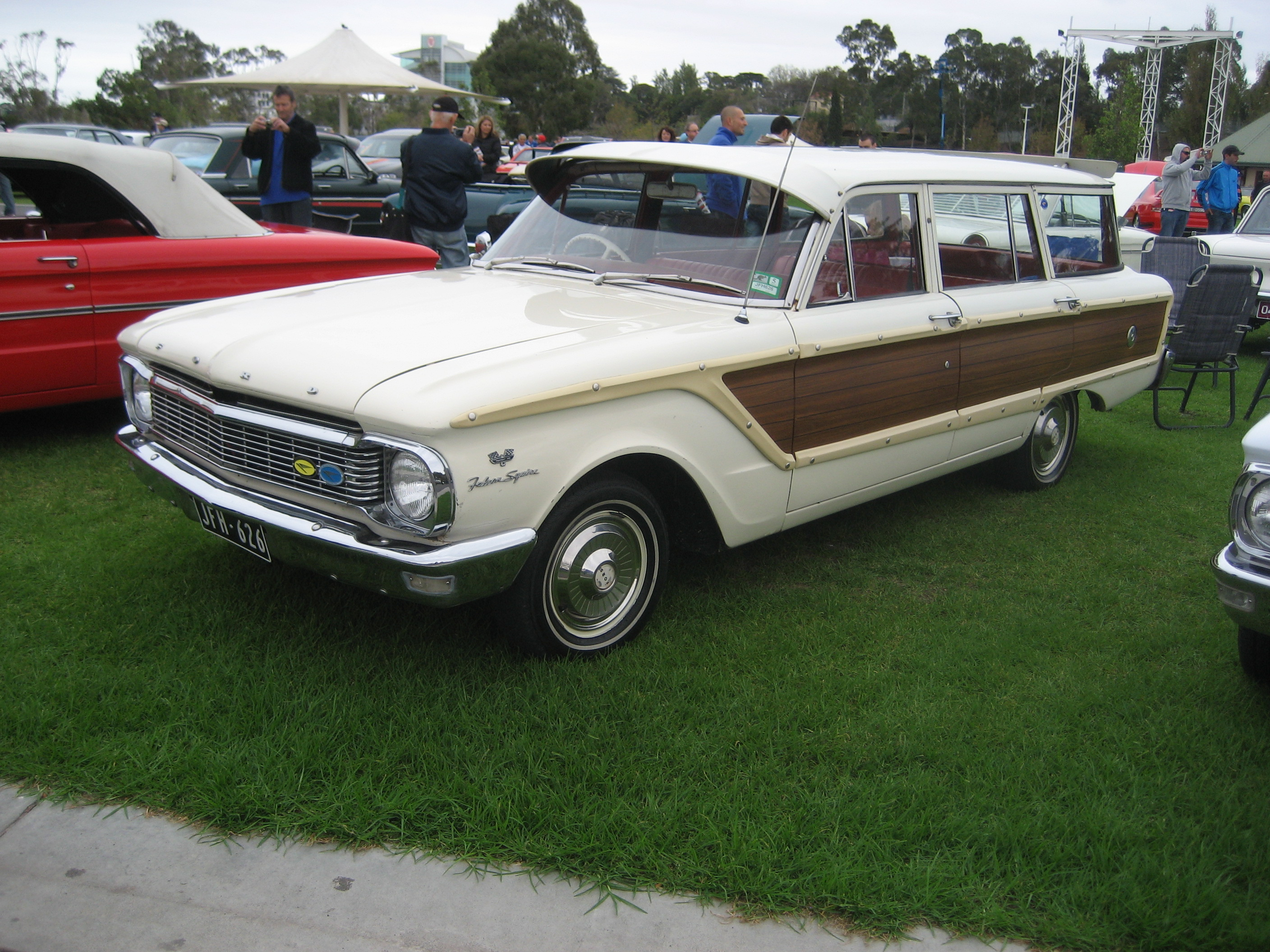
Ford XP Falcon Squire wagon

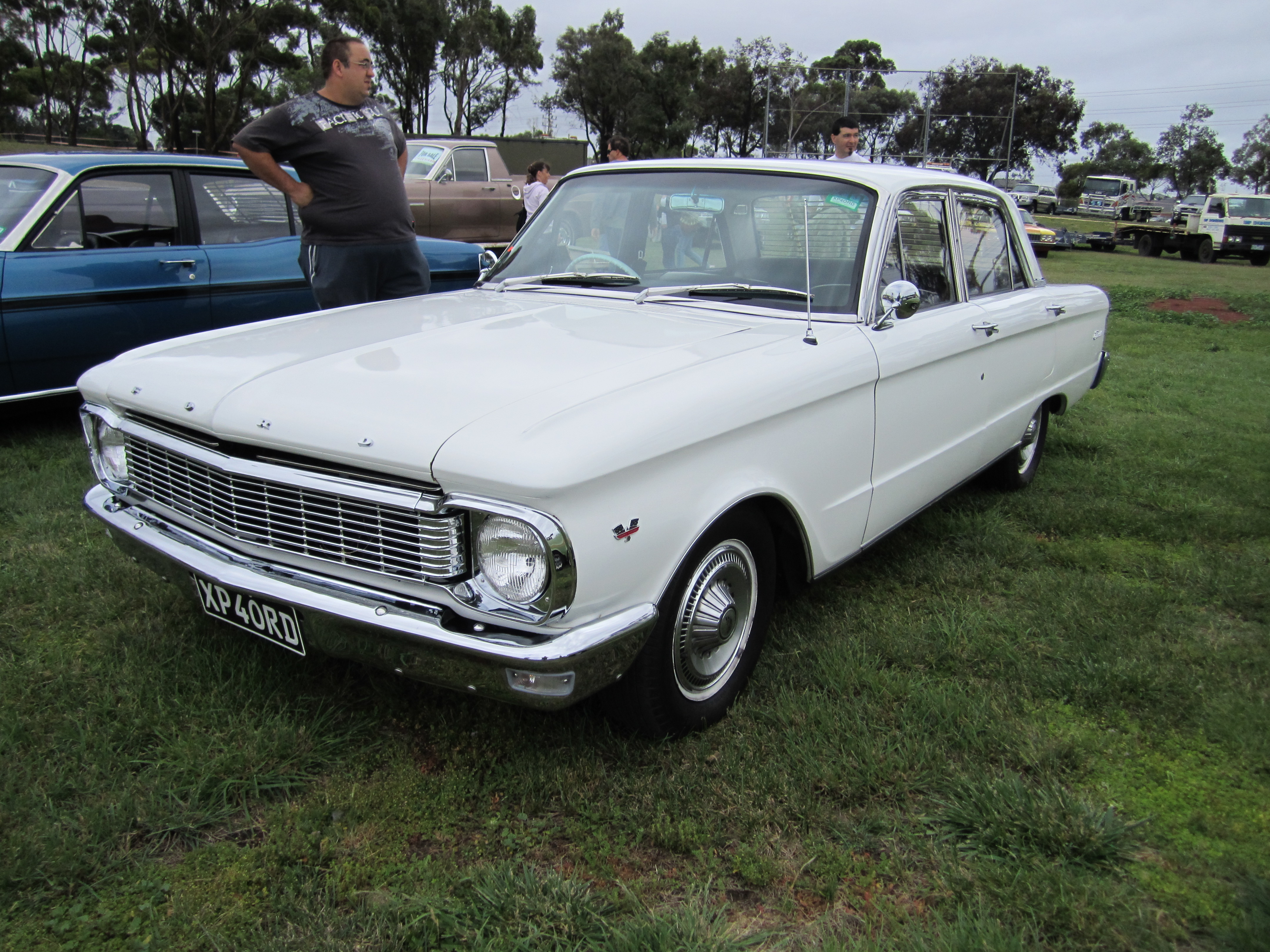
Ford XP Fairmont sedan

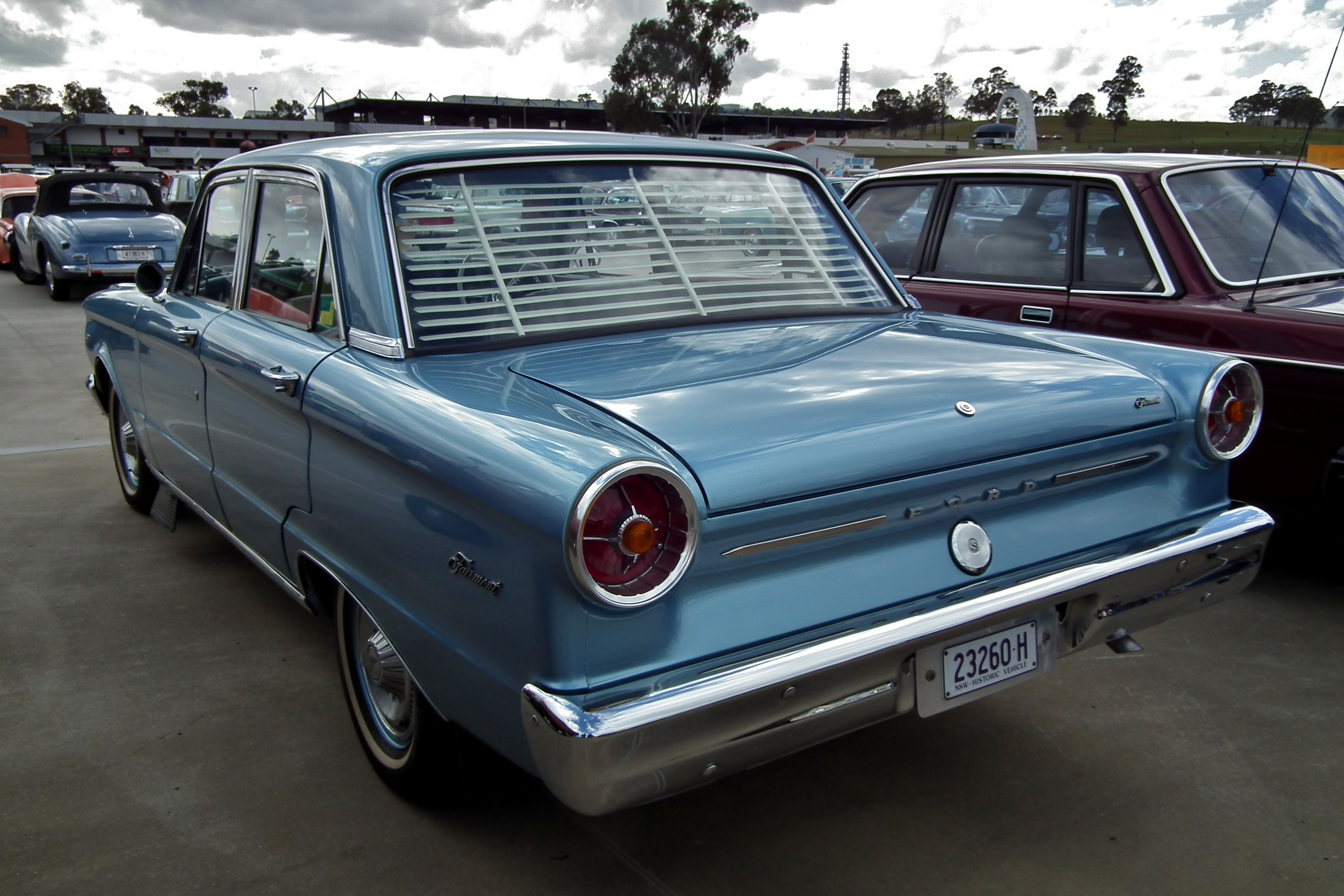
Ford XP Fairmont sedan

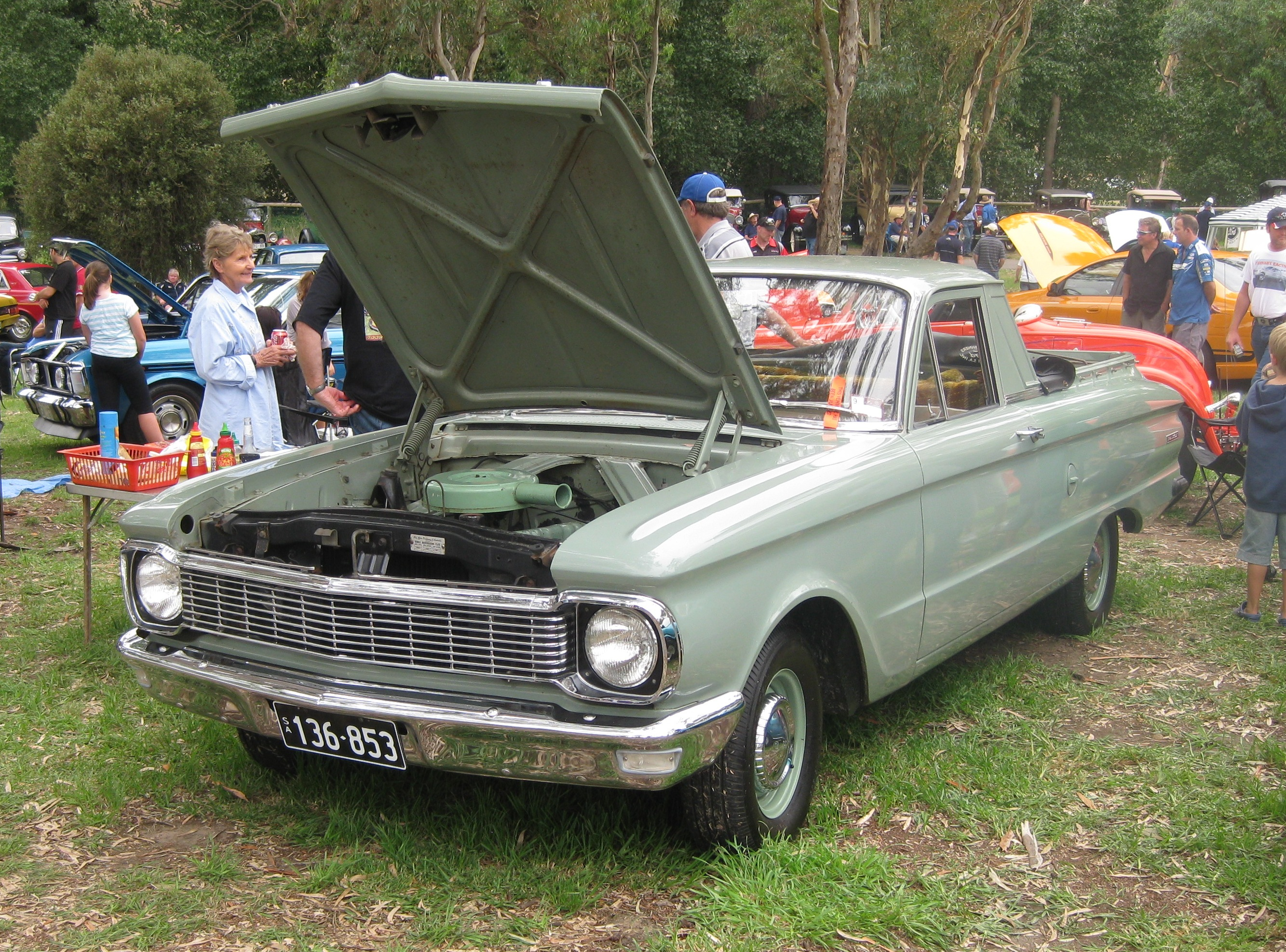
Ford XP Falcon Standard utility

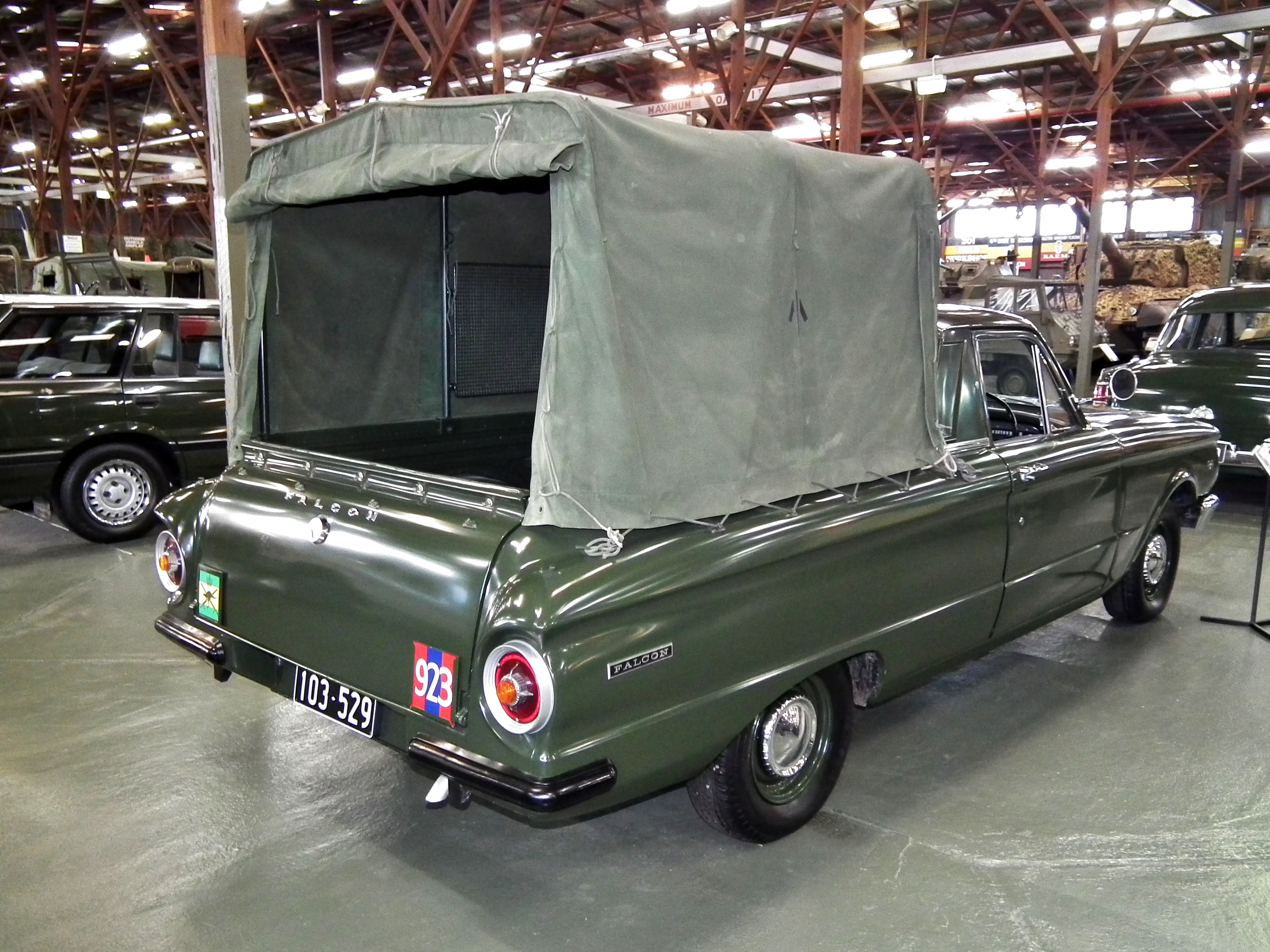
Ford XP Falcon Standard utility with Australian Army specification canvas canopy

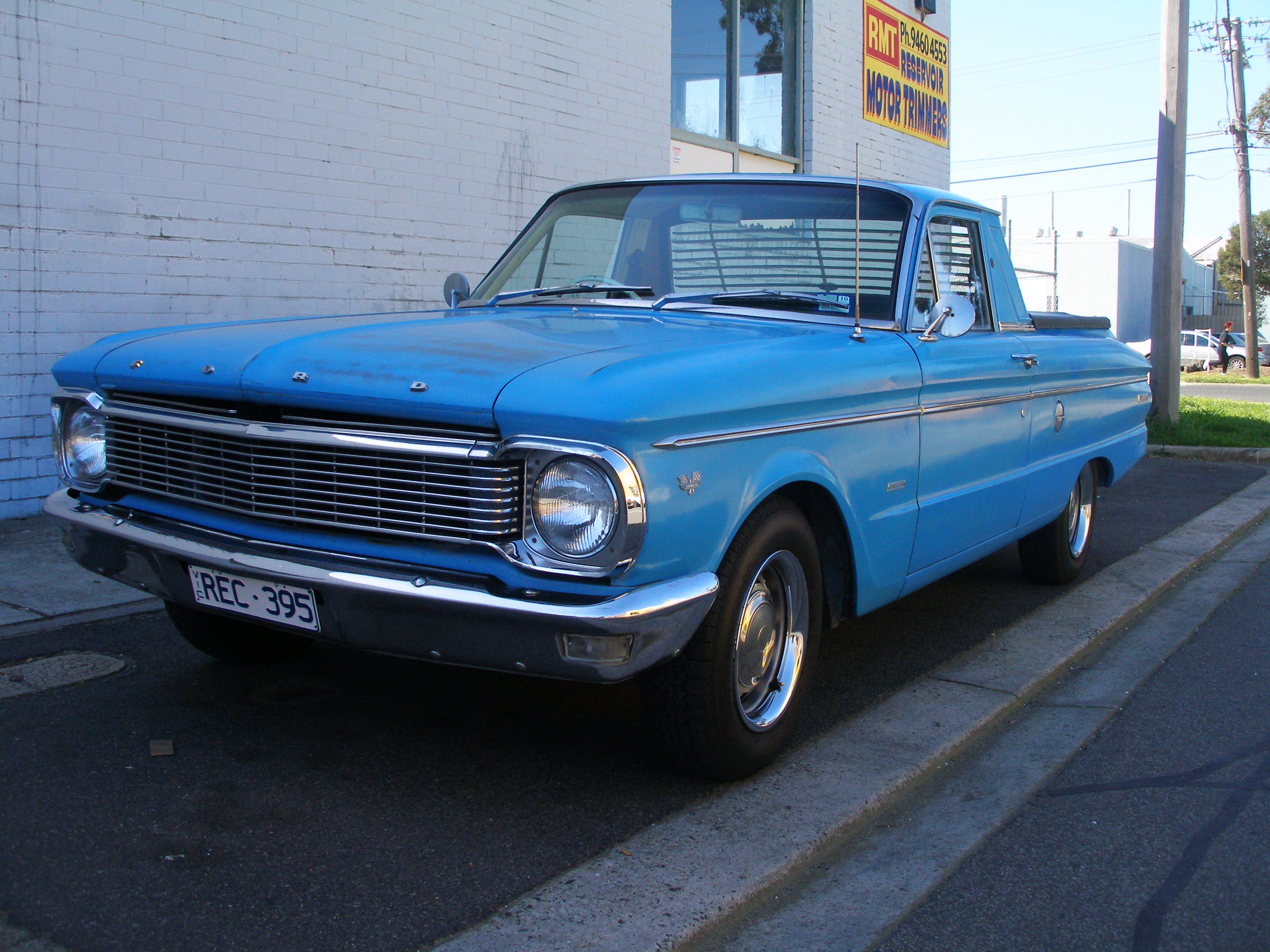
Ford XP Falcon Deluxe utility

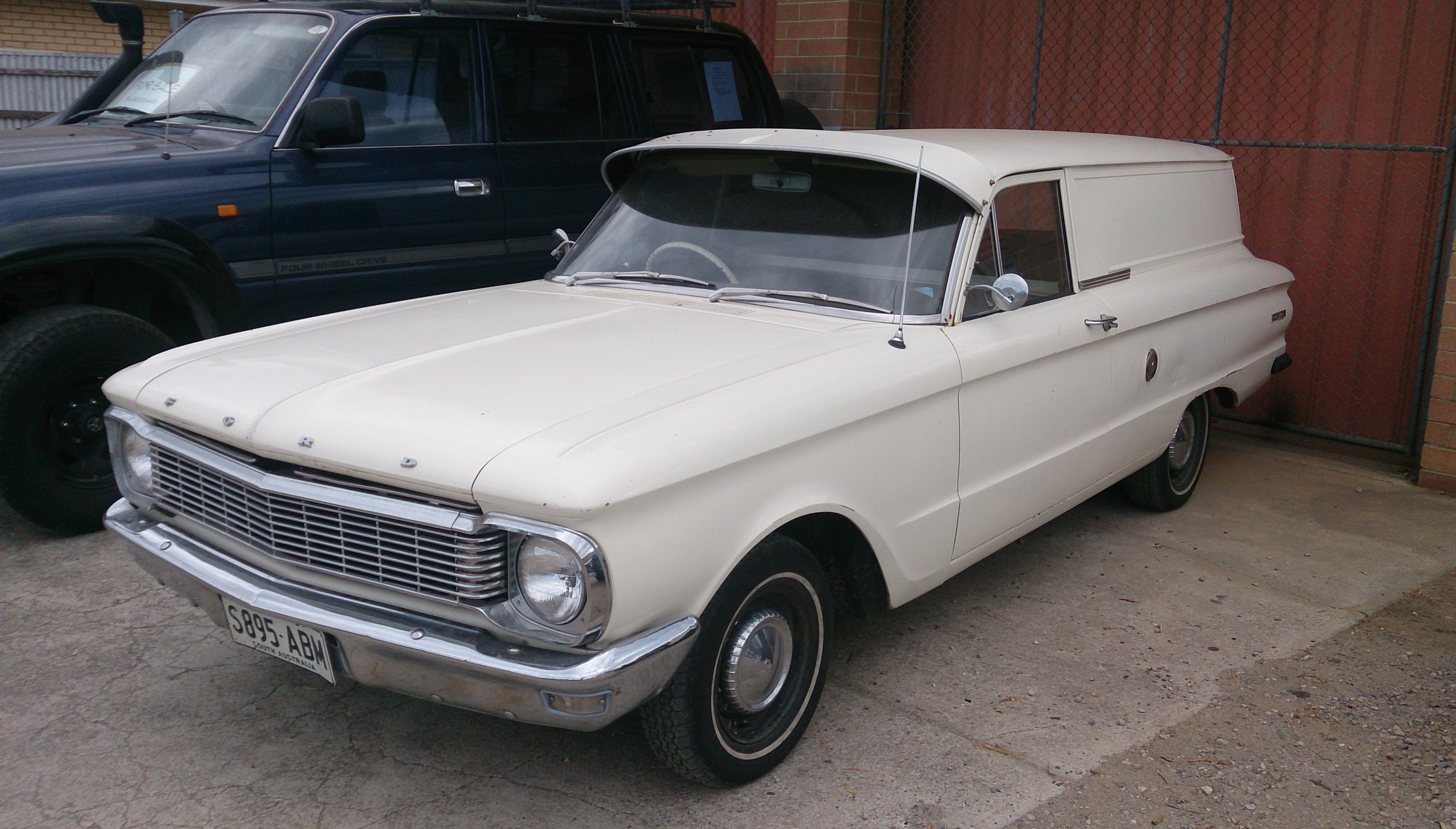
Ford XP Falcon sedan delivery

== Production and replacement ==
Production of the XP Falcon range totaled 70,998 vehicles prior to its replacement by the XR Falcon in September 1966. A total of 93 XP Falcon Squire wagons were produced between February and August 1965.
