= Holden FC =

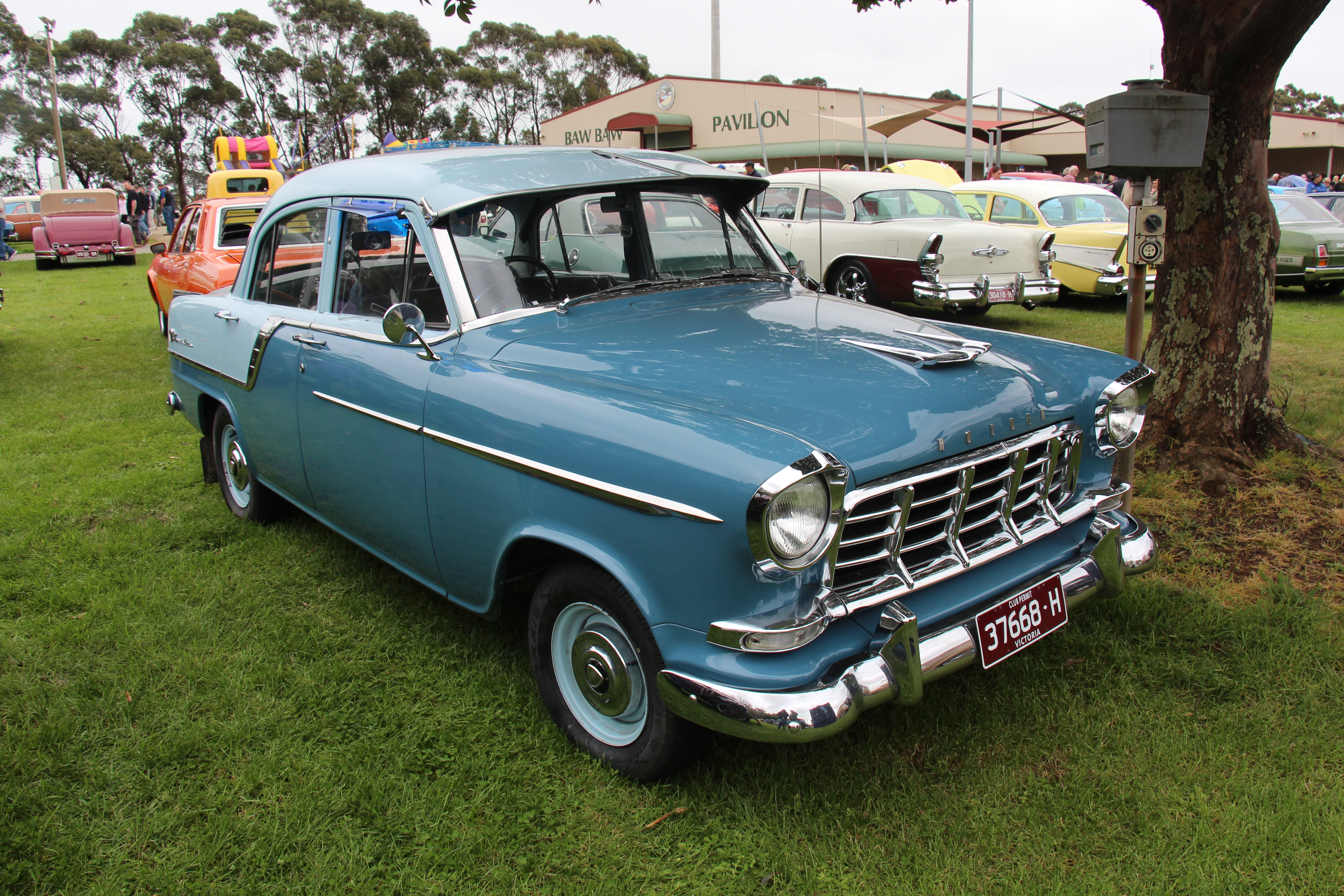
- Holden Special Sedan

Overview
- Manufacturer: Holden (General Motors)
- Also called: Holden Standard; Holden Business Sedan; Holden Special; Holden Utility; Holden Panel Van
- Production: May 1958 – January 1960
- Designer: Alf Payze

Body and chassis
- Class: Mid-size
- Body style: 4-door sedan 5-door station wagon 2-door coupé utility 2-door panel van
- Layout: FR layout

Powertrain
- Engine: 2.2L GMH '132' I6
- Transmission: 3-speed manual

Chronology
- Predecessor: Holden FE
- Successor: Holden FB

The Holden FC series is an automobile produced by Holden in Australia from 1958 to 1960. Introduced on 6 May 1958, the FC is a facelifted and improved version of the Holden FE series, which it replaced. Although it is exclusively an Australian design, the styling is reminiscent of a scaled-down North American 1955 Chevrolet.

== Model range ==
The FC range consisted of four-door sedans in three trim levels, five-door station wagons, marketed as "Station Sedans" in two trim levels, a two-door coupe utility and a three-door panel van. The seven models were:

- Holden Standard Sedan
- Holden Standard Station Sedan
- Holden Business Sedan
- Holden Special Sedan
- Holden Special Station Sedan
- Holden Utility
- Holden Panel Van
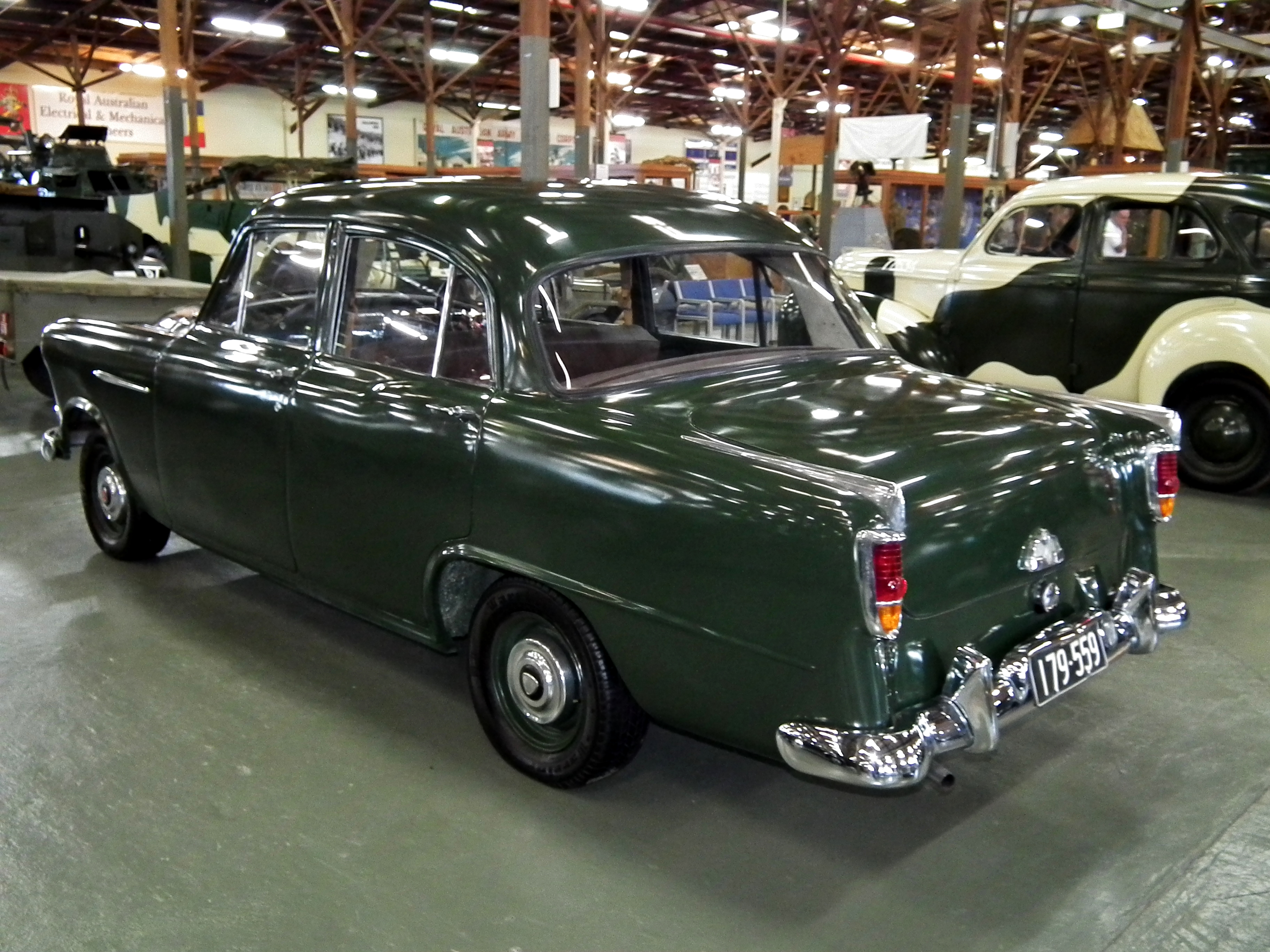
Holden Standard Sedan

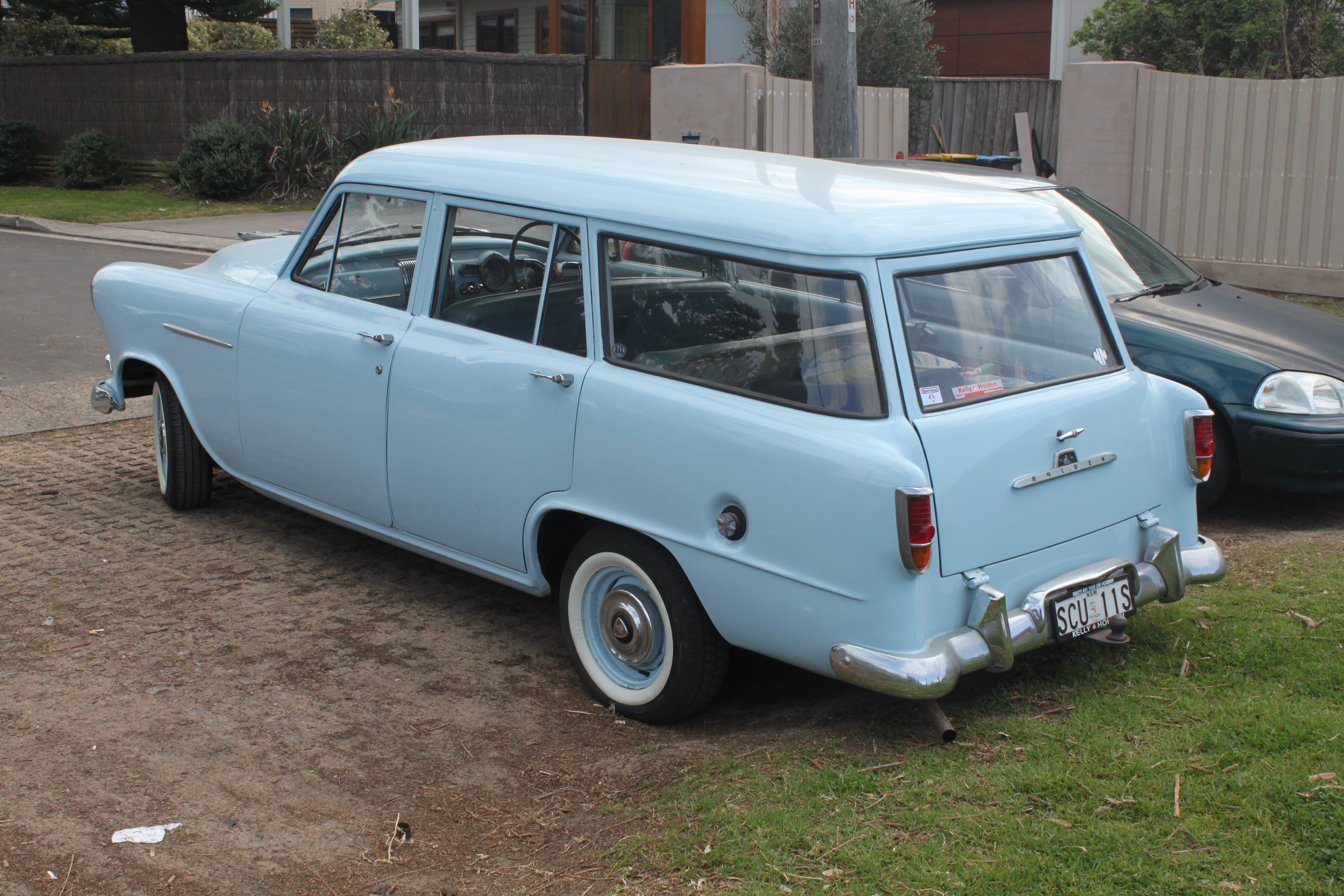
Holden Standard Station Sedan

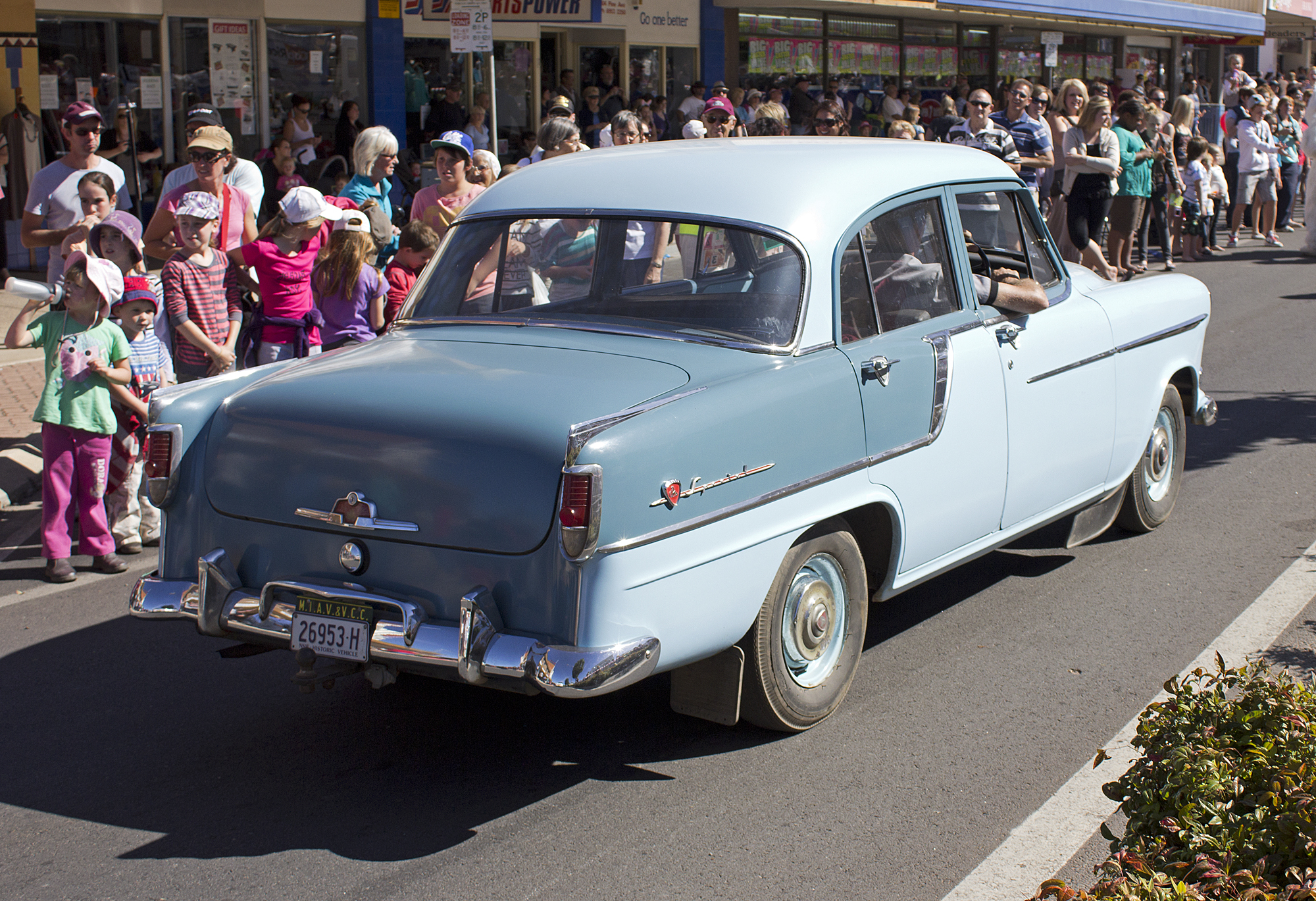
Holden Special Sedan

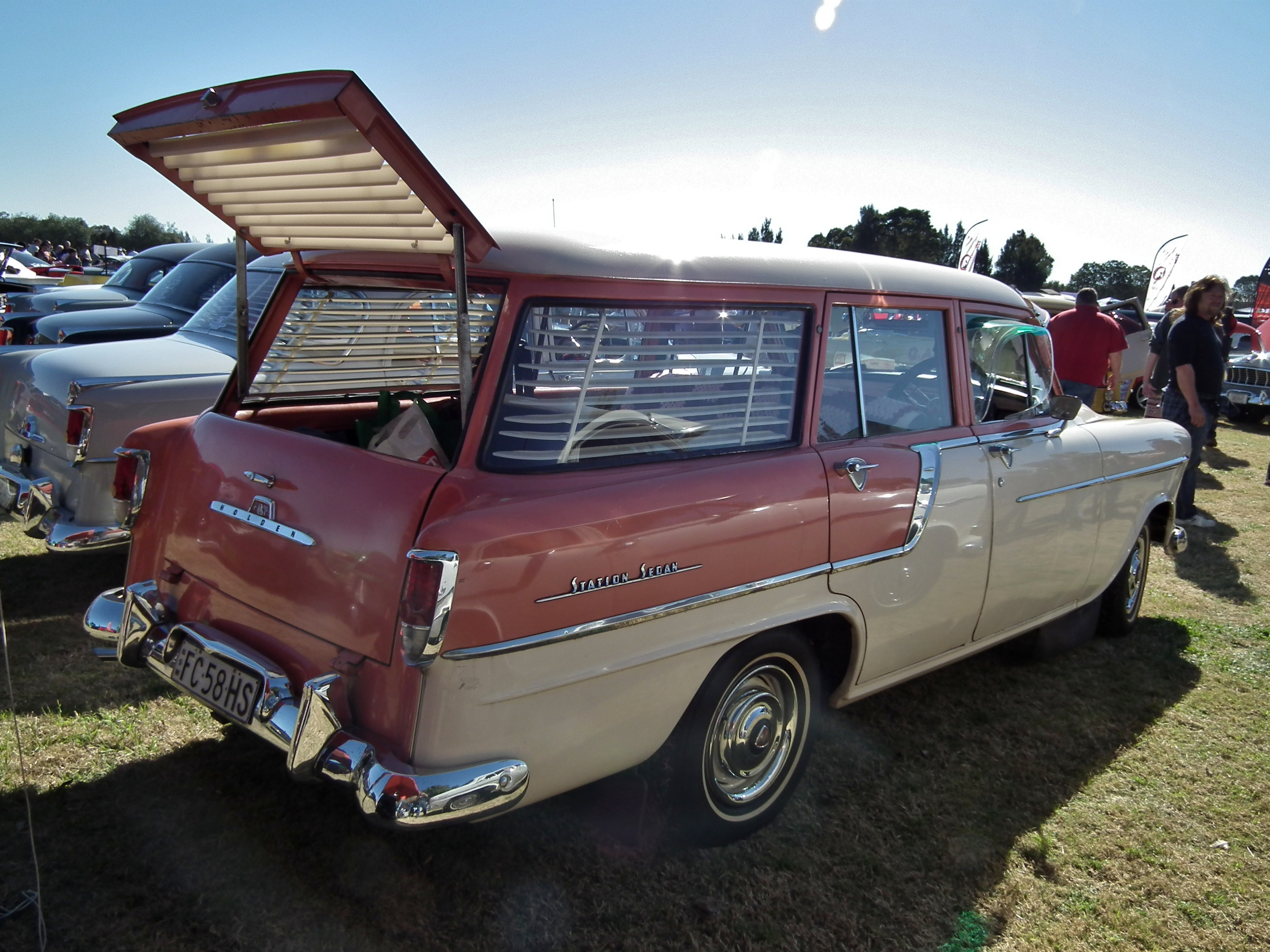
Holden Special Station Sedan

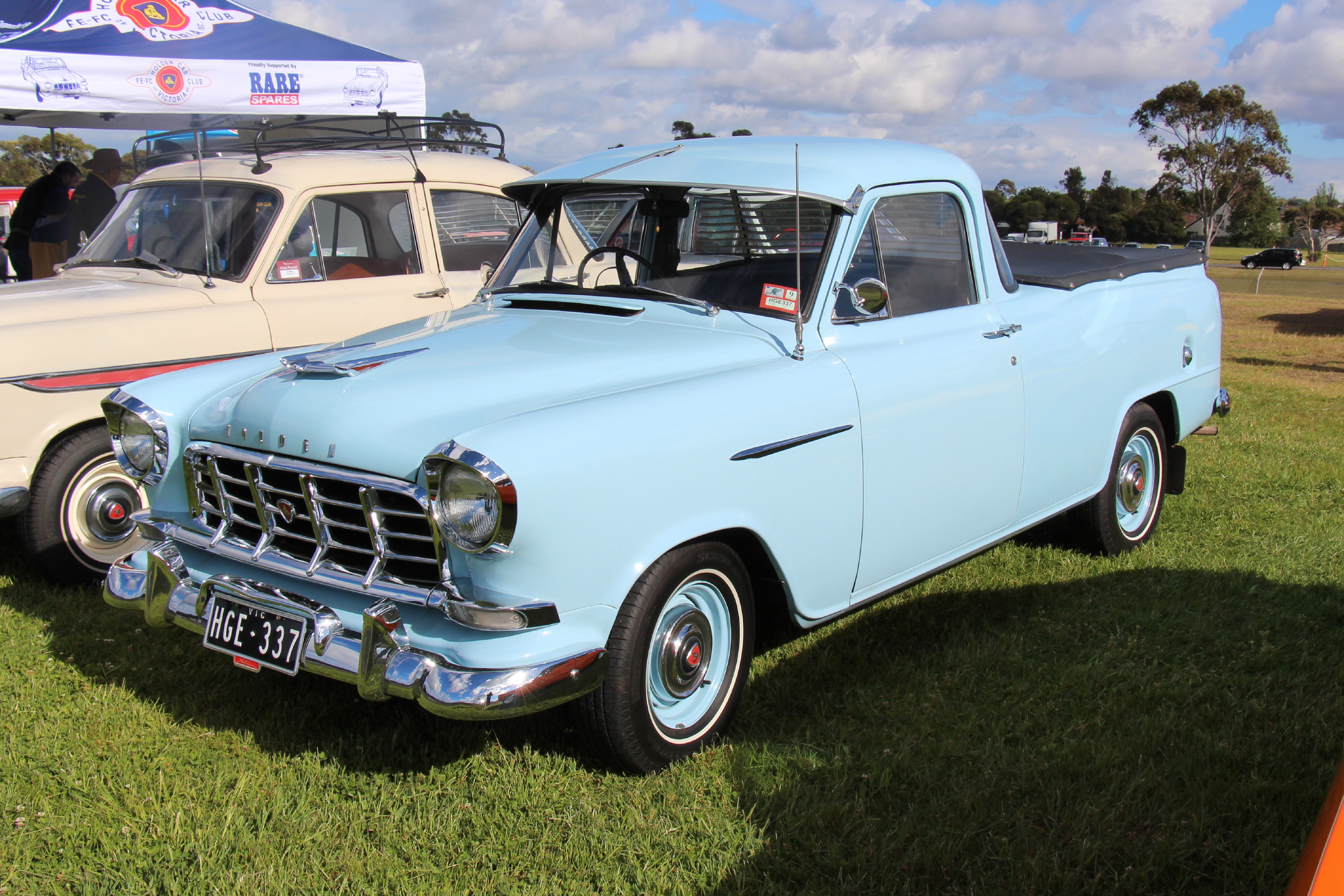
Holden Utility

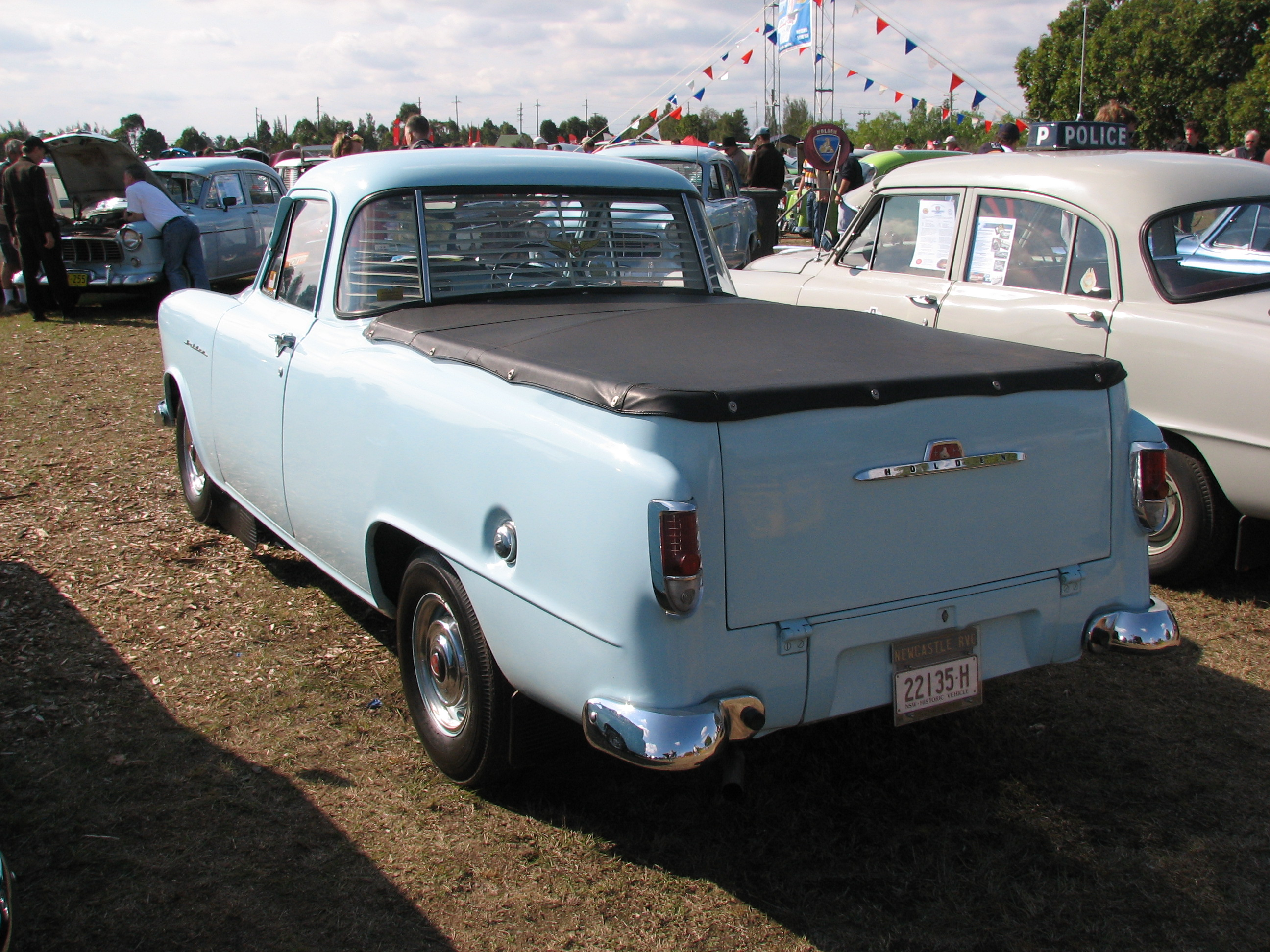
Holden Utility

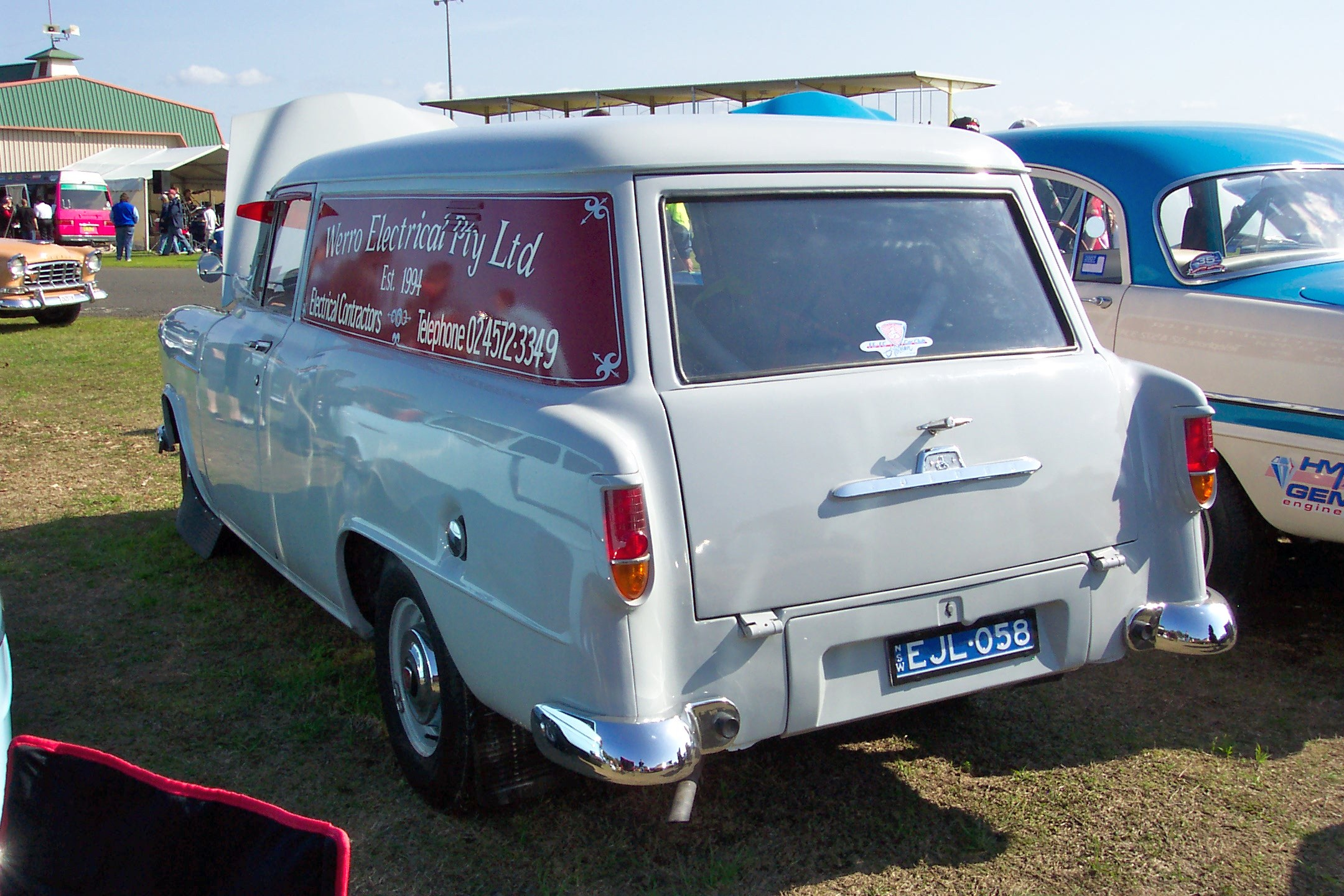
Holden Panel Van

== Changes ==
Although the FC series was substantially the same as the FE, it featured revisions to the radiator grille, body trim and interior. Minor mechanical improvements were also made, with changes to the engine, suspension, brakes, gearchange linkages and the steering box. The Utility now featured painted rather than chromed grille and headlight rims, as did the Panel Van.

== Engine ==
All FC models were powered by a 132-cubic-inch (2.2 L) six-cylinder engine producing 72 bhp (54 kW). This engine was carried over from the FE series, although the camshaft was altered, the compression ratio was increased and torque was improved.

== Production and replacement ==
After a production run of 191,724 vehicles, the FC was replaced by the Holden FB series in January 1960. The FC was the first Holden to be regularly available in Indonesia.
