= Holden FB =

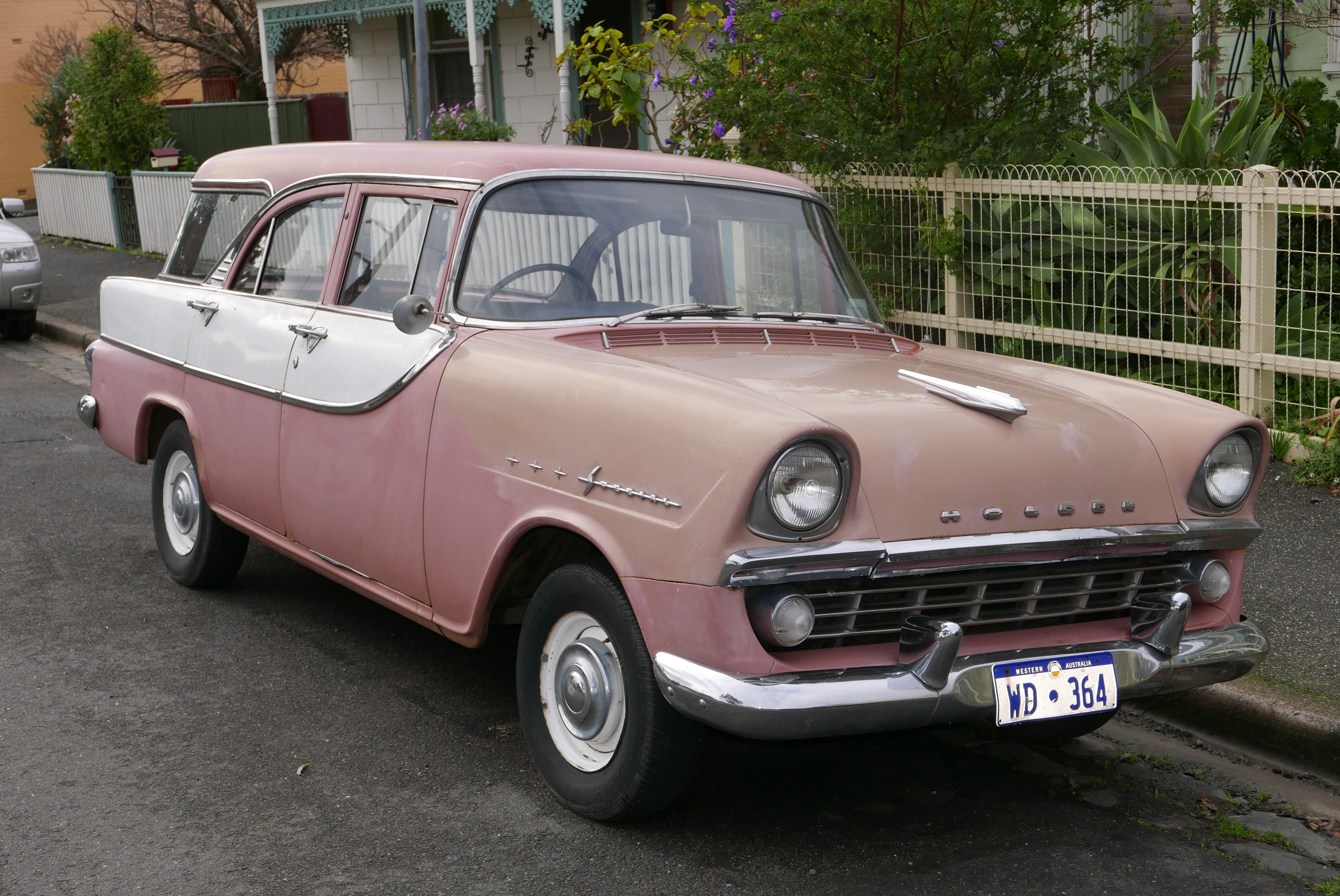
- Holden Special Station Sedan

Overview
- Manufacturer: Holden (General Motors)
- Also called: Holden Standard; Holden Special; Holden Utility; Holden Panel Van
- Production: January 1960 – May 1961
- Designer: Alf Payze

Body and chassis
- Body style: 4-door sedan 5-door station wagon 2-door coupé utility 2-door panel van
- Layout: FR layout

Powertrain
- Engine: 2.3L GMH '138' I6
- Transmission: 3-speed manual

Dimensions
- Wheelbase: 105.0 inches (2667 mm)
- Length: 181.5 inches (4610 mm)
- Width: 67.0 inches (1703 mm)
- Height: 60.0 inches (1521 mm)
- Kerb weight: Standard Sedan: 2473 lb (1122 kg)

Chronology
- Predecessor: Holden FC
- Successor: Holden EK

The Holden FB is an automobile produced by Holden in Australia from 1960 to 1961. Introduced on 14 January 1960, the FB series replaced the Holden FC range.

== Model range ==
The FB range consisted of four-door sedans in two trim levels, five-door station wagons in two trim levels, a two-door coupe utility and a two-door panel van. The six models were marketed as follows:

- Holden Standard Sedan
- Holden Standard Station Sedan
- Holden Special Sedan
- Holden Special Station Sedan
- Holden Utility
- Holden Panel Van

The Holden Business Sedan, which had been marketed as part of the FC range, was not carried over to the FB series.

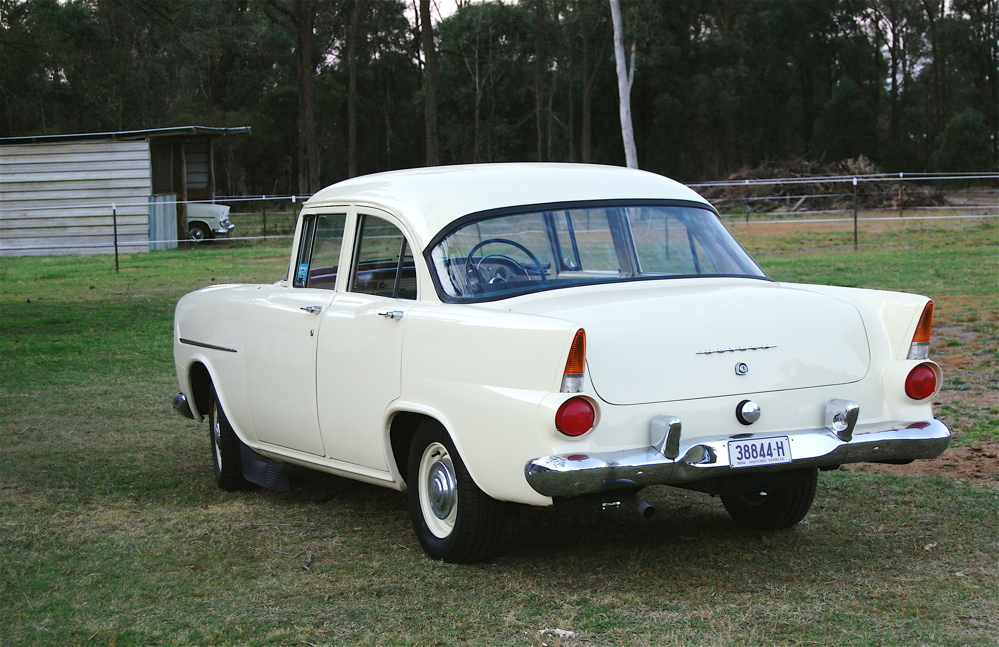
Holden Standard Sedan

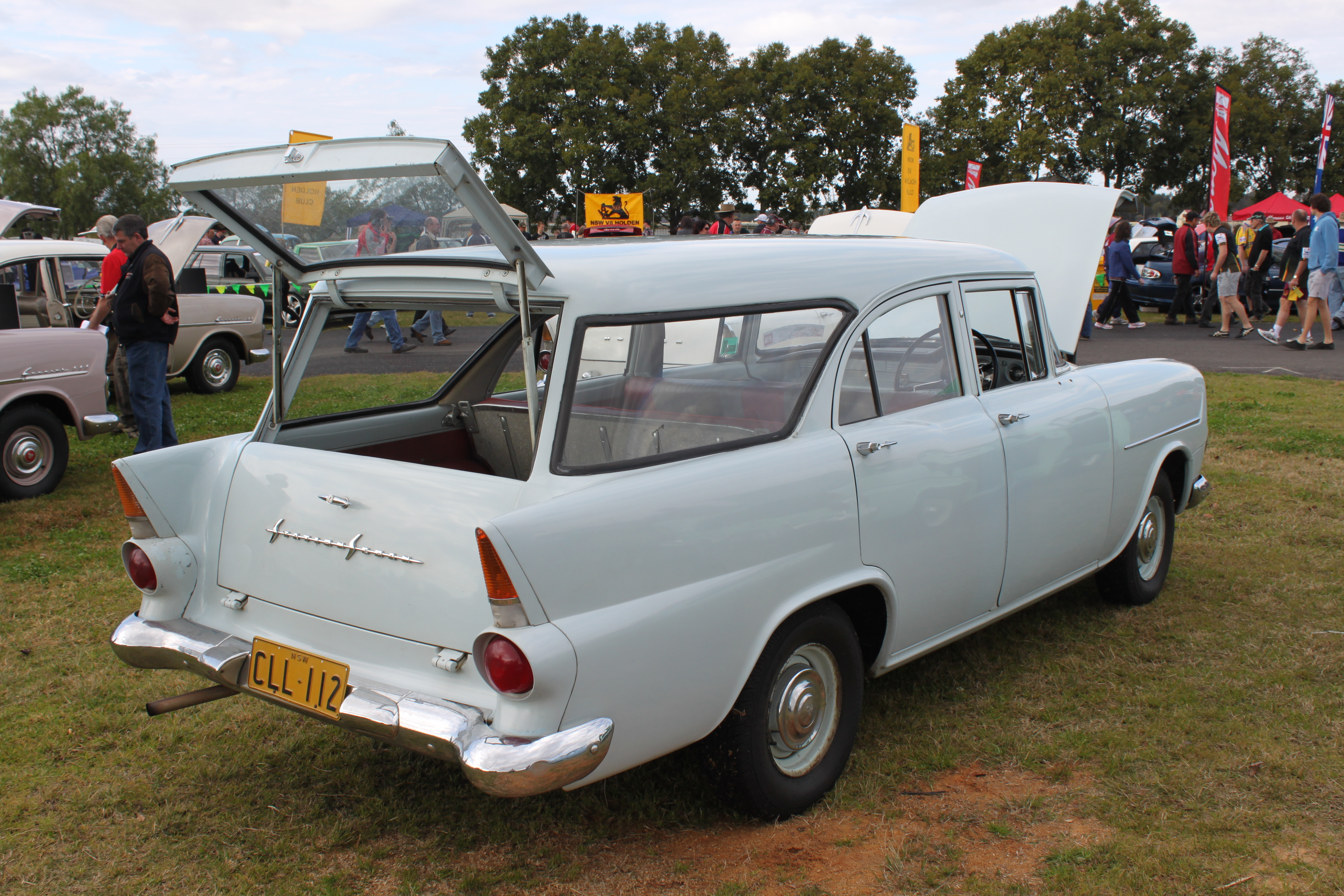
Holden Standard Station Sedan

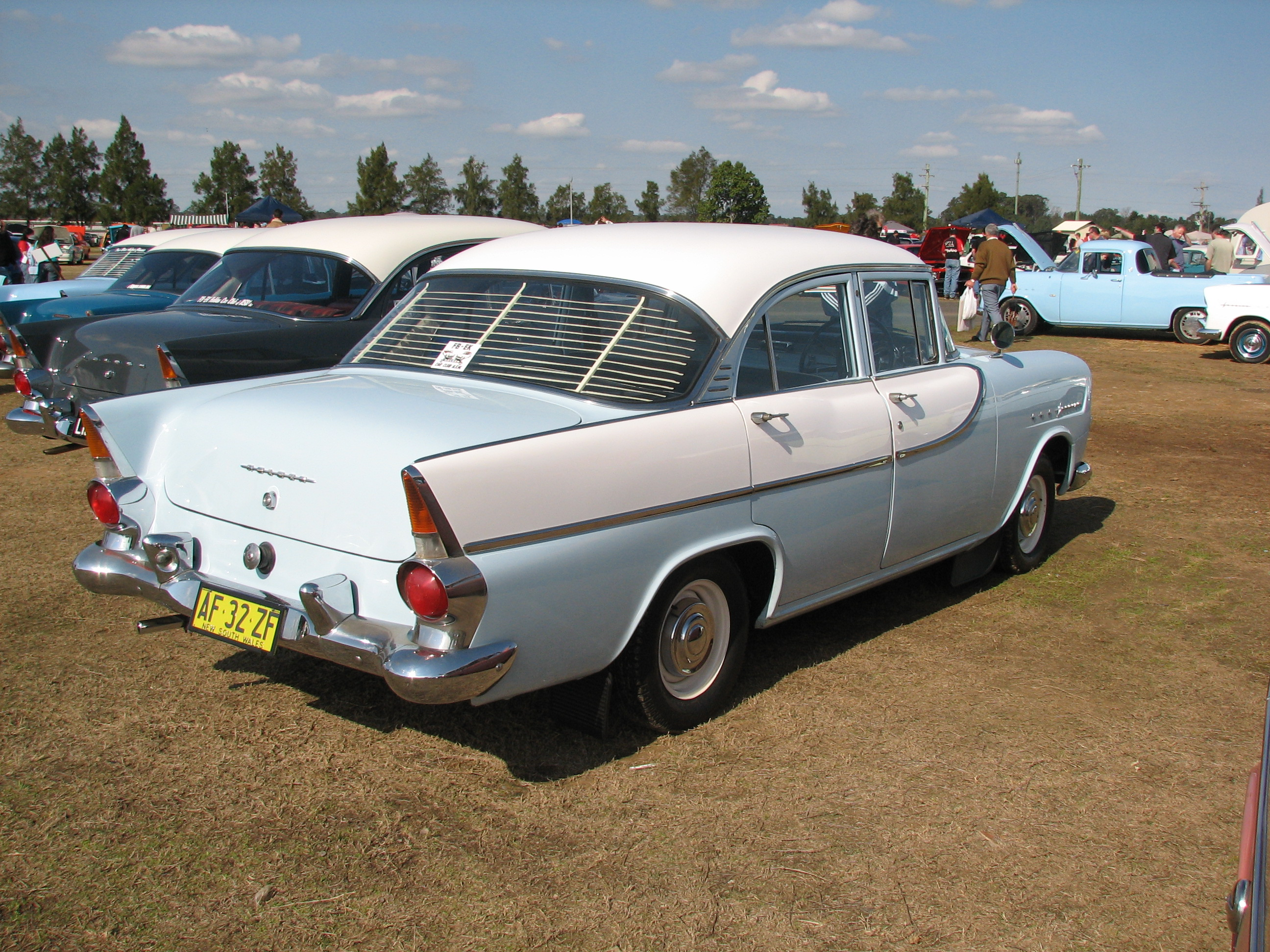
Holden Special Sedan

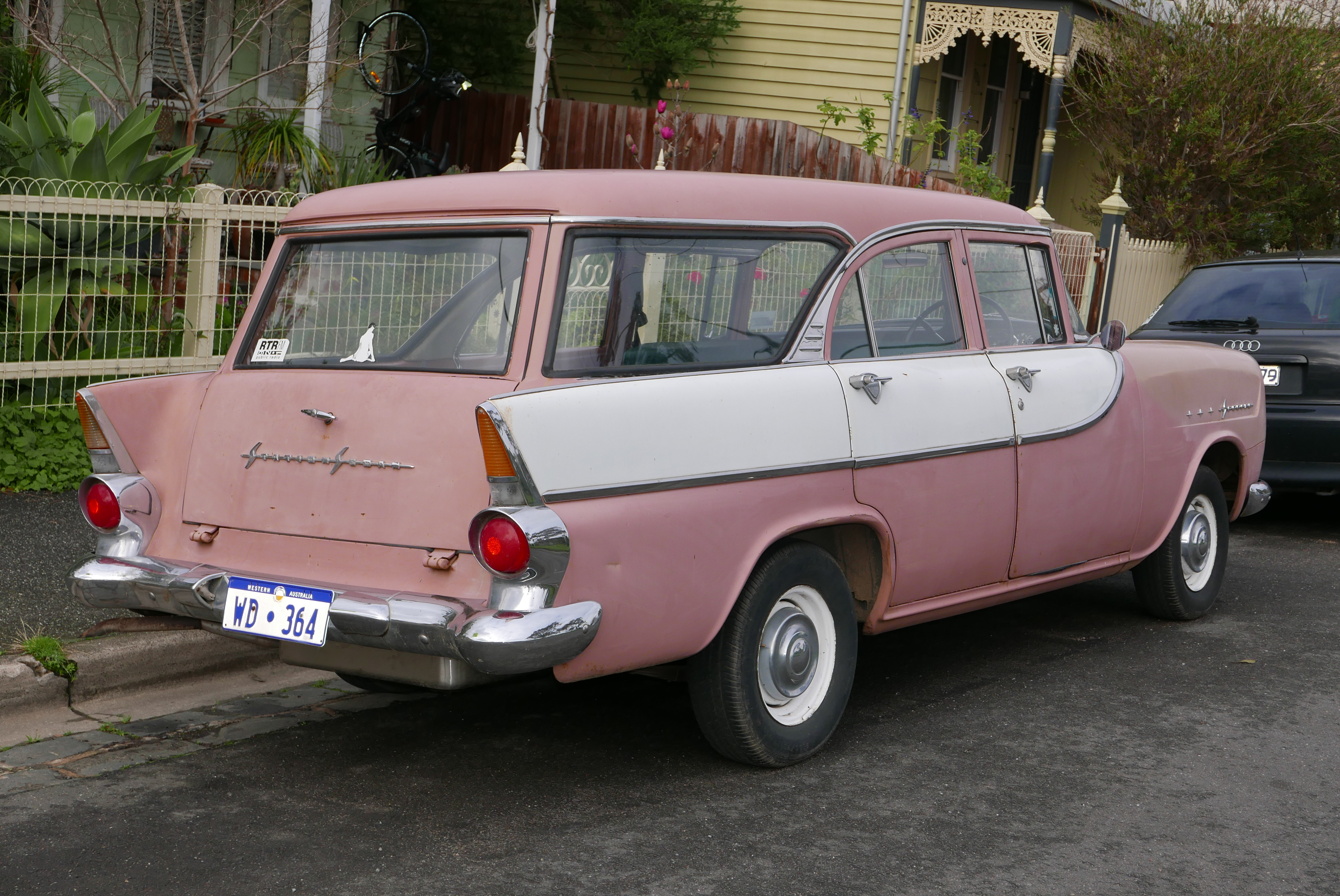
Holden Special Station Sedan

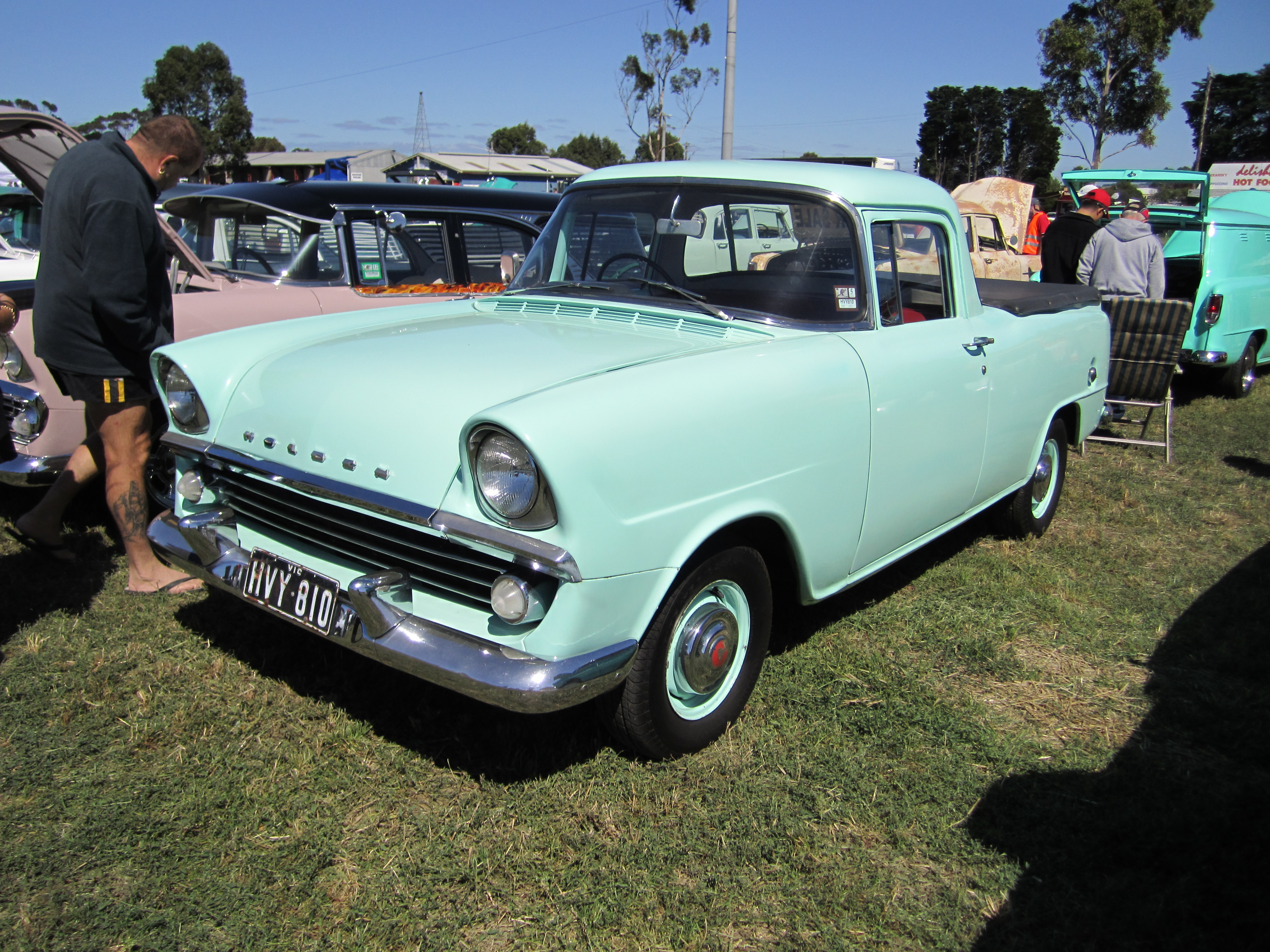
Holden Utility

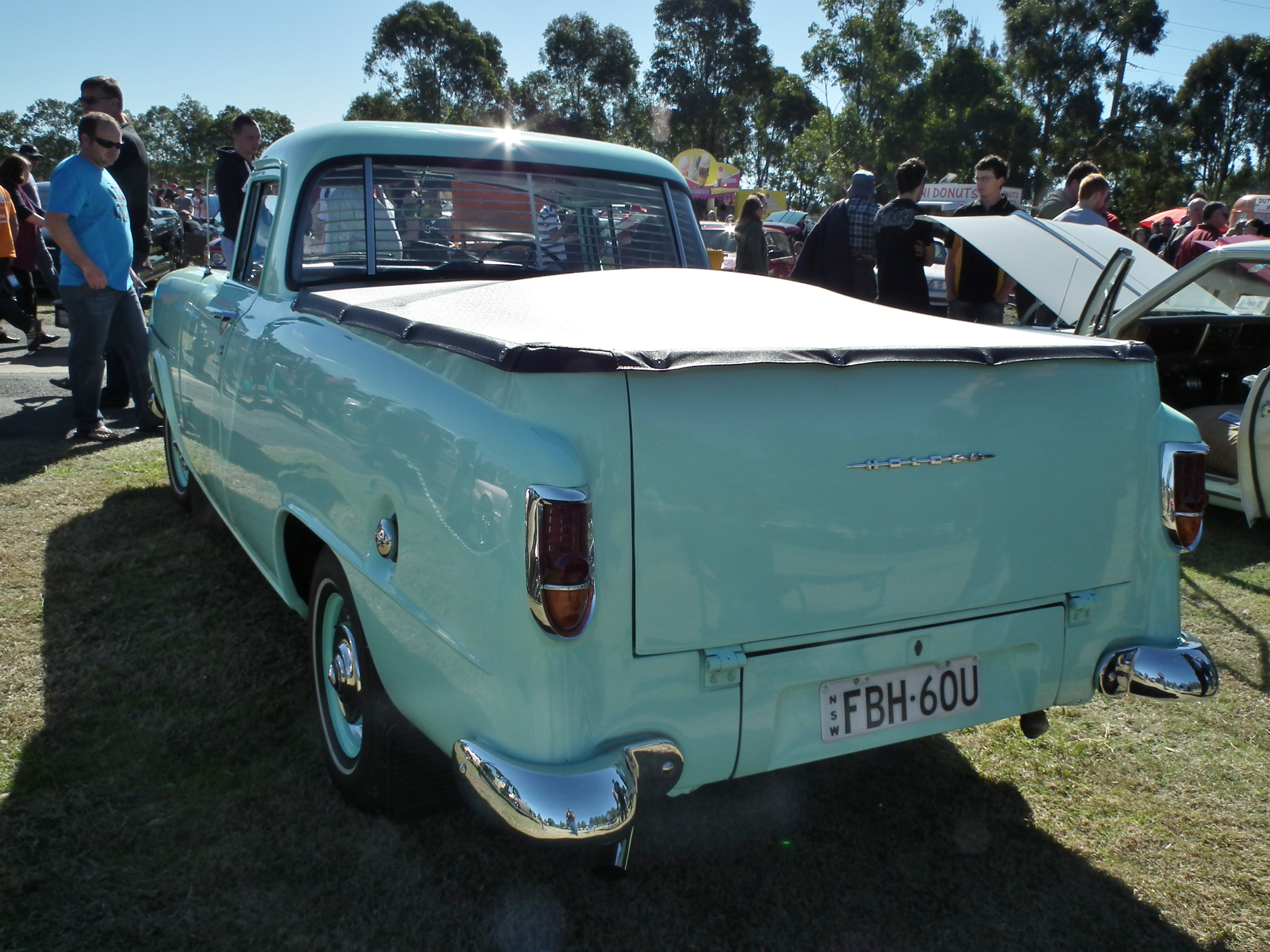
Holden Utility

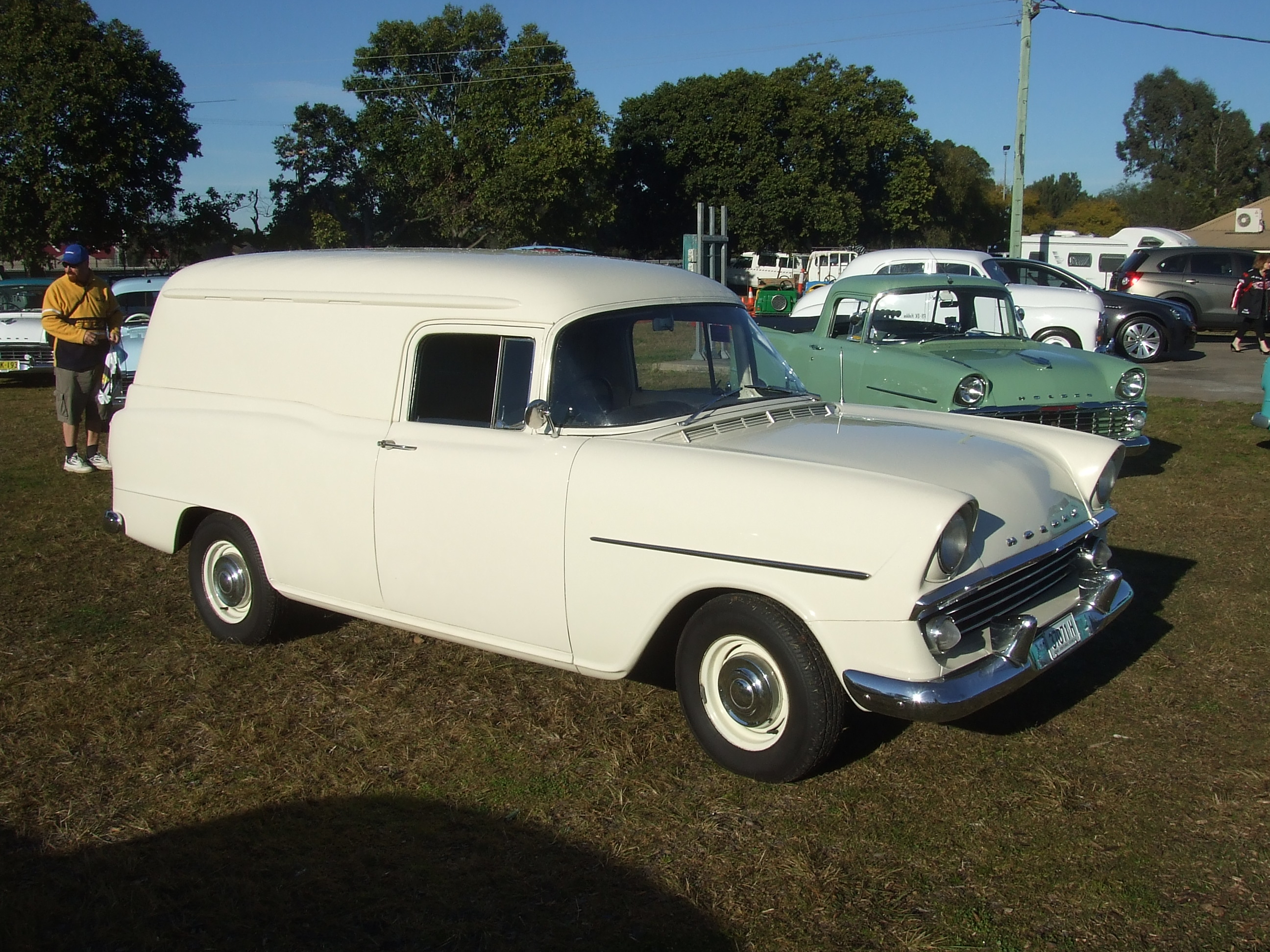
Holden Panel Van

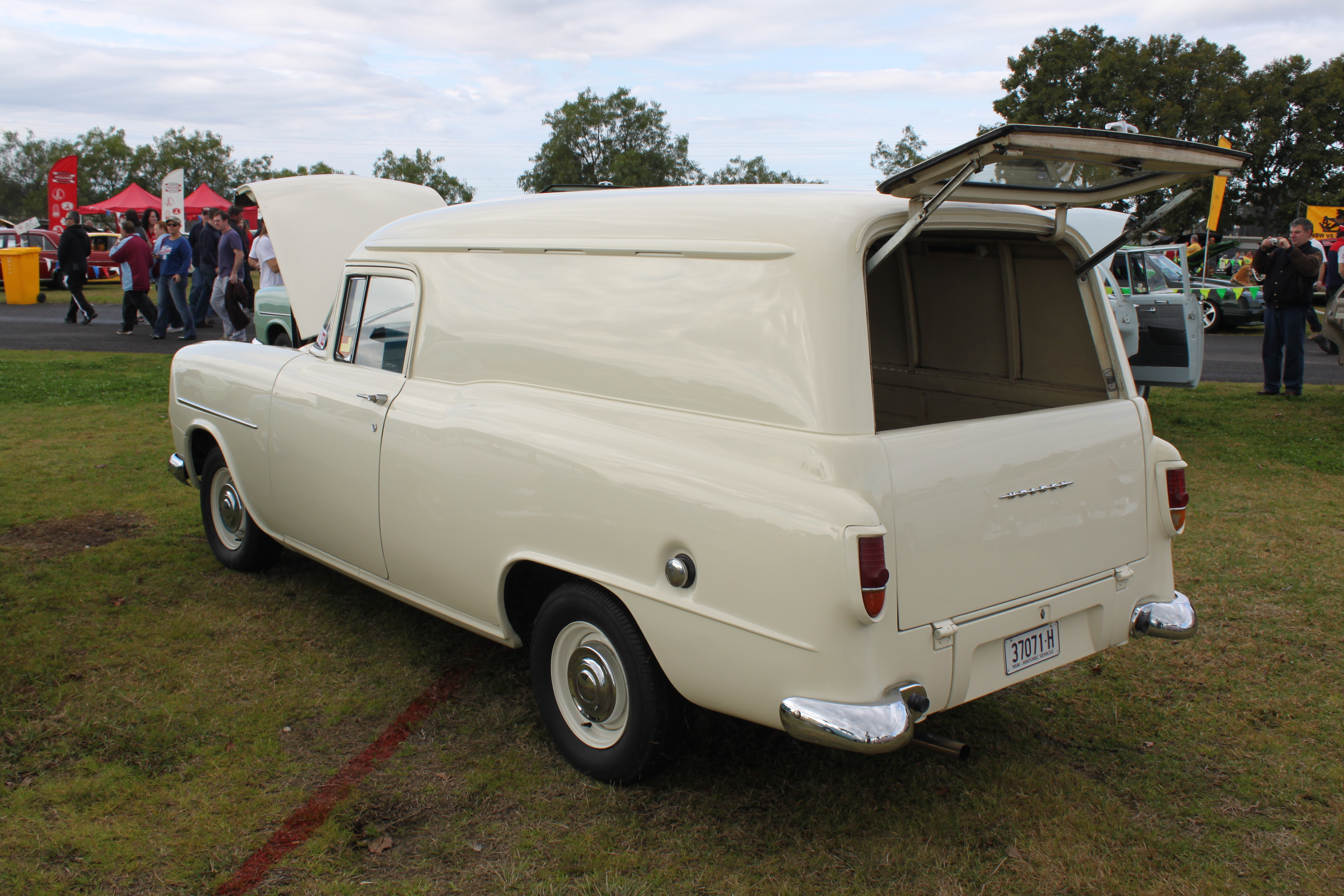
Holden Panel Van

== Changes ==
The FB was promoted as being longer, lower, more spacious and more powerful than the FC model, but in reality it was only slightly so on each count. Overall length was 5.5 inches (140 mm) greater, although the wheelbase remained the same. The engine bore was still 3 inches (76 mm), the last model with that specification. Engine capacity remained at 132 cubic inches (2.16 L) but the compression ratio was raised. However, the resulting extra 4 brake horsepower (3 kW) of power did not compensate for the greater weight of the FB, so performance was inferior to that of its predecessor. Changes were also made to the brakes, front coil springs, air cleaner and clutch. The FB Holden also saw the end of the Nitrocellulose Lacquer (Duco) finishes with Holden switching to and introducing the new "Magic Mirror" Acrylic finish in May 1960. Obvious styling differences were the lower bonnet, finned rear mudguards with new taillights (on the sedans and wagons only) and a wrap-around windscreen. Seating was improved, as was the instrument panel.

Notably, the FB was the first Holden model to also be produced in left-hand drive form, those vehicles being destined for export markets.

== Engines ==
All FB models were powered by a 138-cubic-inch (2.26 L) inline six-cylinder engine, the last to have the 3-inch (76 mm) bore size, producing 75 brake horsepower (56 kW).

== Production and replacement ==
After a production run of 147,747 vehicles, the FB was replaced by the Holden EK series in May 1961.
