= Holden Special =

Mid-size car from Holden

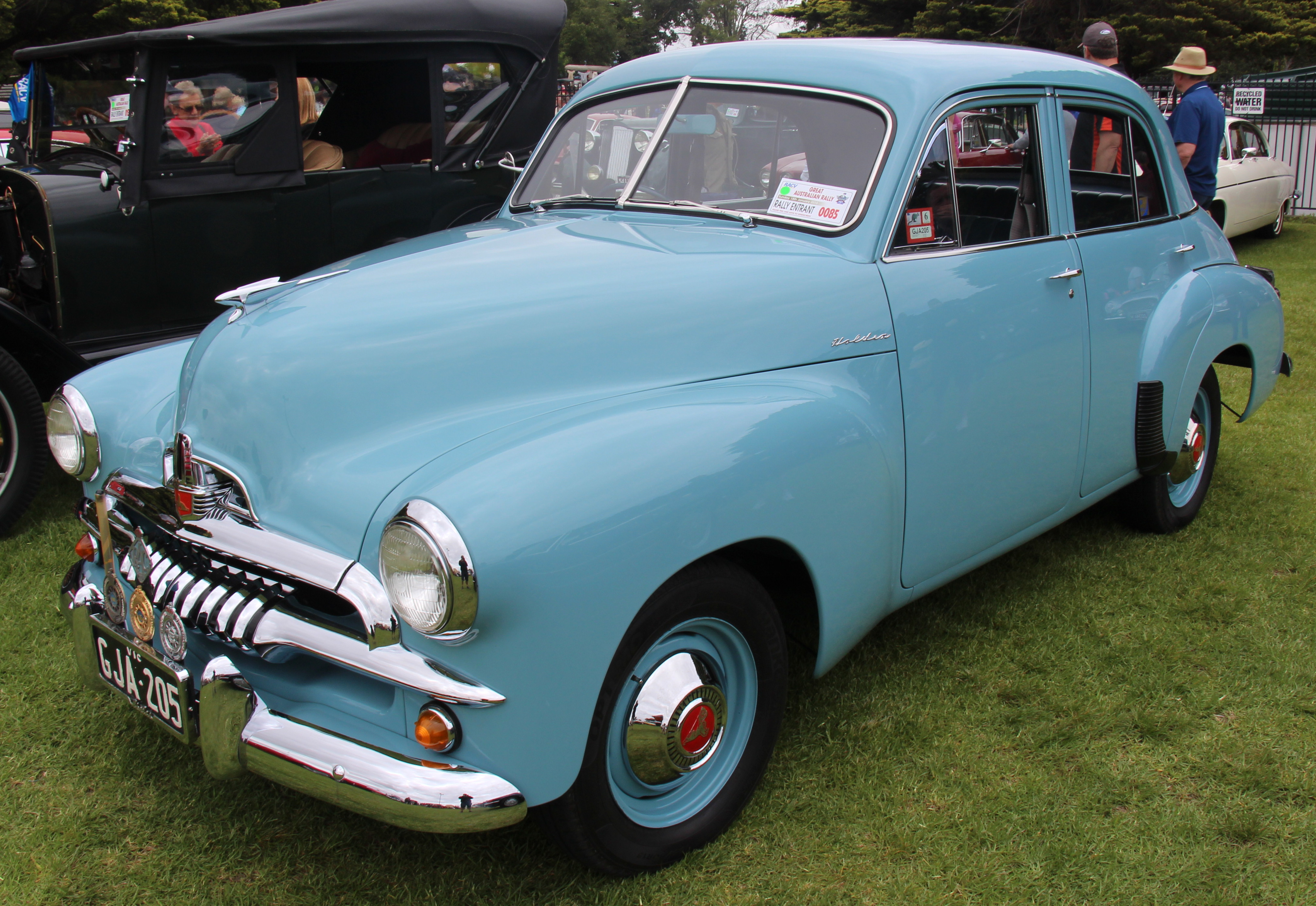
- Holden Special (FJ) sedan

Overview
- Manufacturer: Holden (General Motors)
- Also called: Holden Business; Holden Premier; Holden Standard
- Production: 1953–1968

Body and chassis
- Class: Mid-size
- Body style: 2-door coupé utility 3-door panel van 4-door sedan 5-door station wagon

Chronology
- Successor: Holden Kingswood

The Holden Special is a mid-size car that was manufactured by Holden for Australasia. Introduced as the top-level trim in the new Holden FJ range of 1953, the Special was complemented by the entry-level Holden Standard and the mid-range Holden Business. The Business was in fact already available, introduced in July 1953 in the 48 series first seen in 1948. Three months later, the FJ was introduced, therefore forming a three-model lineup based around one car. A "Standard"-type variant also existed in the 48 series, but had been marketed simply as the "Holden".

There were also coupé utility and panel van variants, introduced in 1951 (48) and 1953 (FJ) respectively. These were both based on the Standard, although neither were badged this way. Collectively, the two cars were known as the Holden Utility and panel van. From March 1957 the sedan, utility and panel van body styles were complemented by a new five-door station wagon. The wagon was marketed as the "Station Sedan" in both Standard and Special trim levels.

The Business sedan was omitted from the Holden lineup in mid-1959, during the FC production run, leaving just the Standard and Special. However, in 1962 the Holden Premier was introduced with the EJ series, becoming the new flagship, with the Special assigned as the mid-range Holden. This model trio continued until the 1968 HK series. The Standard became the Belmont, the Special the Kingswood, with the Premier staying as is. A new extended-length Brougham also joined the line-up, becoming Holden's topline offering.

== First generation (1953–1956) ==
=== 48 ===
The Business was introduced in July 1953, in four-door sedan form only, as a better equipped version of the basic Holden 48-215 series sedan introduced in 1948 and was specifically aimed at the taxi market. Improvements included passenger grab rails, door pull handles, seat kick plates, heavy-duty seats, floor mats, a heavy-duty battery and a boot lid handle. The Business Sedan was officially designated as model 48-215-257. Like the basic Holden sedan, it was powered by a 132.5 cubic inch six cylinder engine.

=== FJ ===
Only three months after the introduction of the original Business, the 48 series was replaced by the revised FJ Business. This series also included a new trim level, the Special, which was positioned above the Business in terms of price and equipment level. The new Business was designated as model FJ-217.

== Second generation (1956–1960) ==
=== FE ===
The FE series of July 1956 continued to offer Standard, Business and Special sedans but now featured new body styling, a longer wheelbase (up 2 inches (51 mm) to 105 inches), a more powerful engine (up 10 bhp (7.5 kW) to 70 bhp), revised electrics, steering and interior trim. The Business sedan was designated as model FE-217. From March 1957 a station wagon body style was offered in the FE series, but only in Standard and Special trim.

=== FC ===
The revised FC series introduced in May 1958 was a face-lift, offering only minor improvements over the FE. The Business was designated the FC-217.

== Third generation (1960–1962) ==
=== FB ===
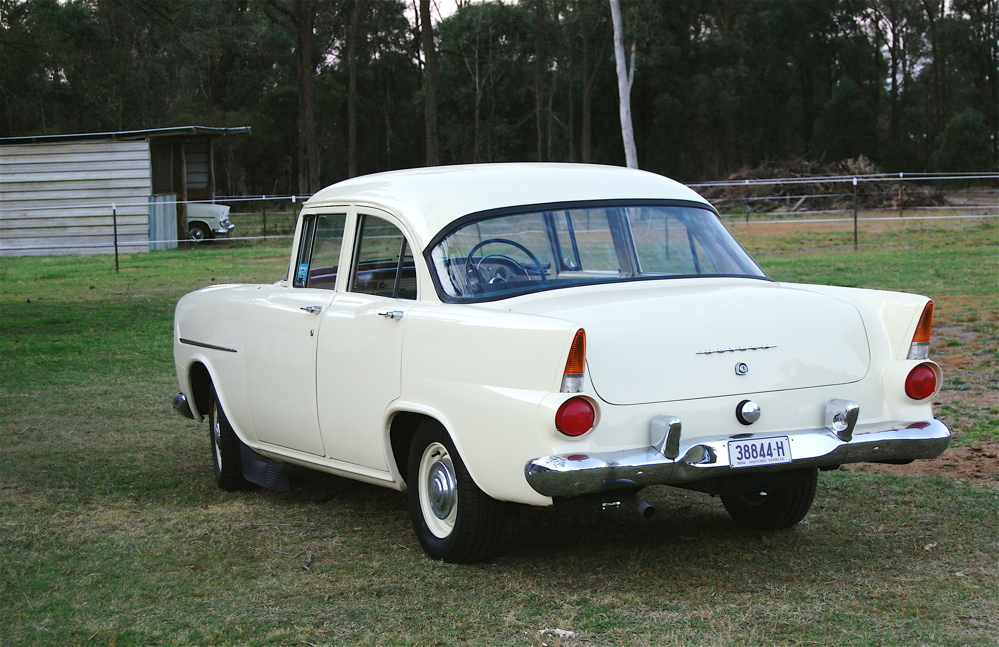
Holden FB Standard Sedan.

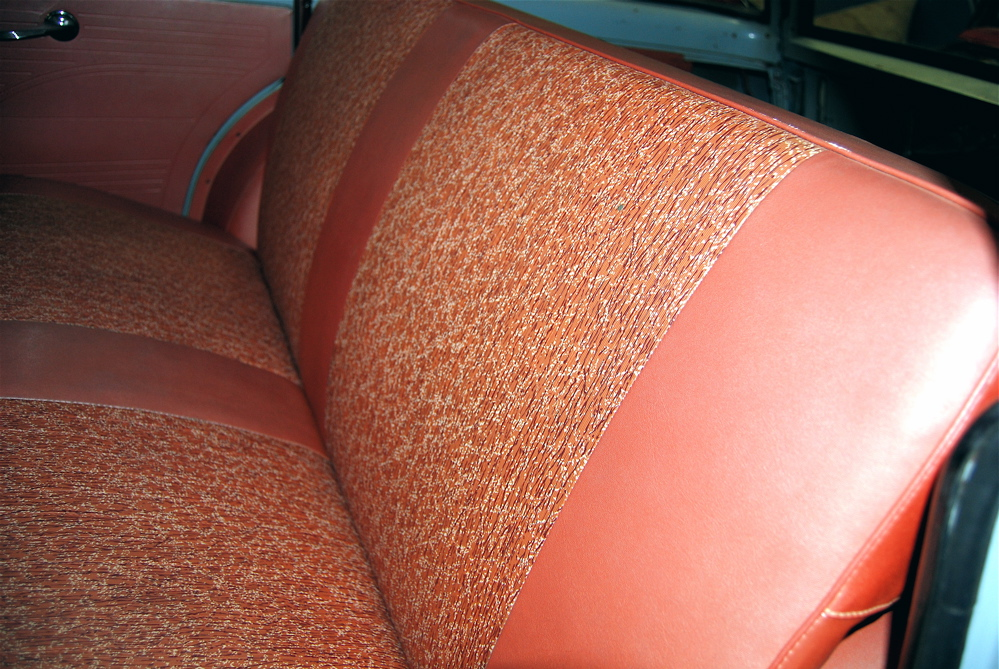
Holden FB Trim.

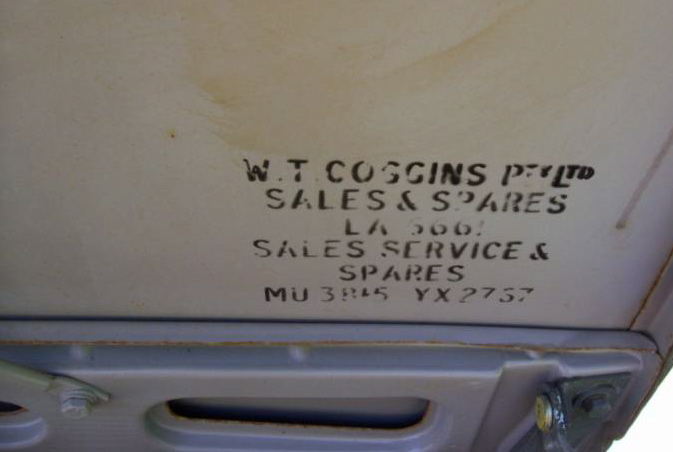
Holden Dealer logo FB.

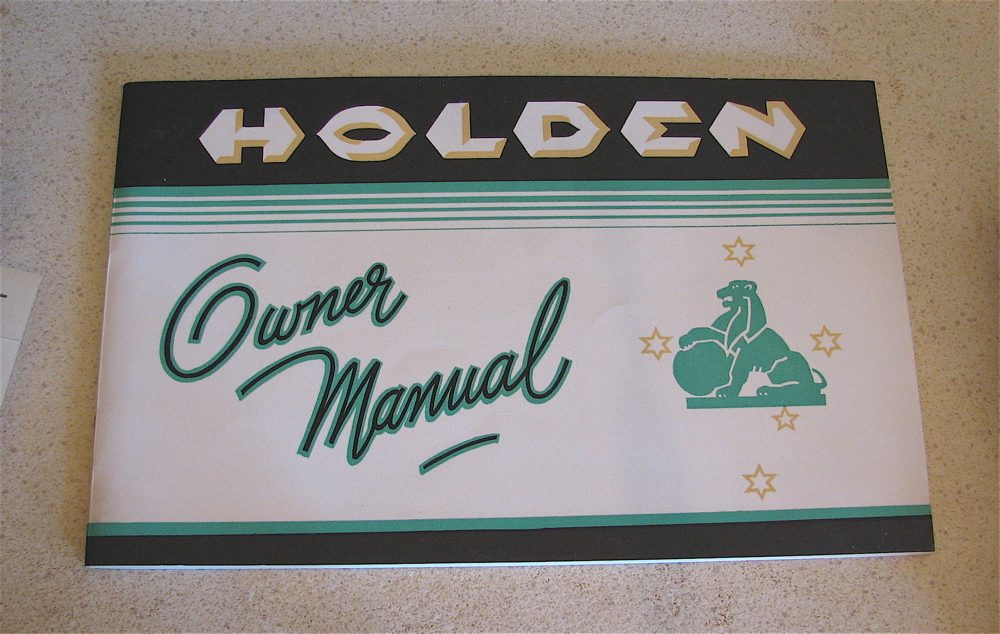
Holden FB Owners Manual.

The introduction of the FB series in January 1960 saw the Business sedan discontinued, leaving the Standard and the Special as the only Holden sedans for the first years of the new decade.

Holden Produced 174,747 Holden FB's. The FB continued the General Motors Holden's (GMH) unique Australian mid-size GM offering, in contrast to the larger American, or smaller English variants. With predominantly US design features such as the FB's rear pointed twin fins, wrap around windscreen A-pillar, and new American Style dashboard with speedo featuring an orange-coloured indicator band instead of a needle pointer. The Holden FB and larger US variants such as the Chevrolet and Pontiac had a lot in common.

The FB Holden was manufactured with four common body styles. The Special sedan (model FB/225), Special station wagon (model FB/229), Standard sedan (model FB/215), Standard station wagon (model FB/219), Standard panel van (model FB/2104) and standard utility (model FB/2106).

The FB Holden also saw the end of the Nitrocellulose Lacquer (Duco) finishes. These early model FBs are very sought after in their original paint, as Holden introduced the "Magic Mirror" Acrylic finished in May 1960. With these change came new colours. Out were Nitro colours, Alpine Blue, Arctic Beige, Belmont Green, Biscay Green, Buckskin, Corana Grey, Desert Glow, Fernando Yellow, Lucerne Blue, Mandan Red, Raphael Ivory, Royal Glow, Sandstone Beige. All very rare colours to find on an FB Holden today, due to the five-month production window. On the subject of windows, the FB had 27 percent more glass area than the previous Holden the FC. The FB was also lower wider and longer than the FC.

The Holden FB panel van proved to be a big hit in the commercial sectors. The new 1960 FB panel van was the first Holden with a high roof. The FC Holden van was more or less a windowless station wagon in comparison.

Holden FB is also noted as Holden's first export left hand drive car. The first of these cars being delivered to Hawaii.

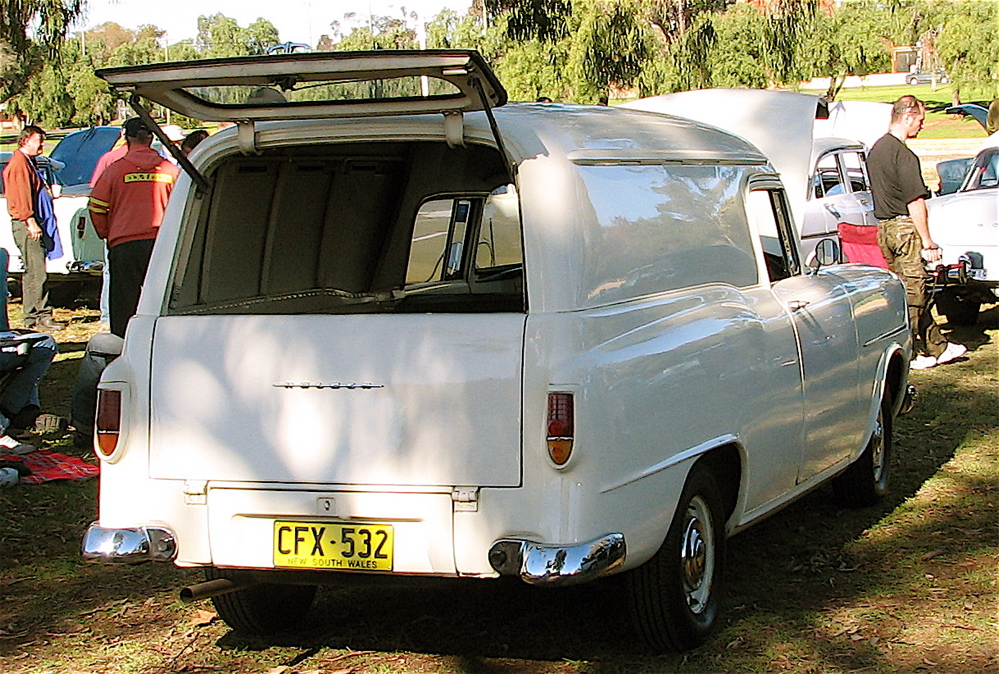
1960 Holden FB panel van (2104), Honey Beige, original windowless.

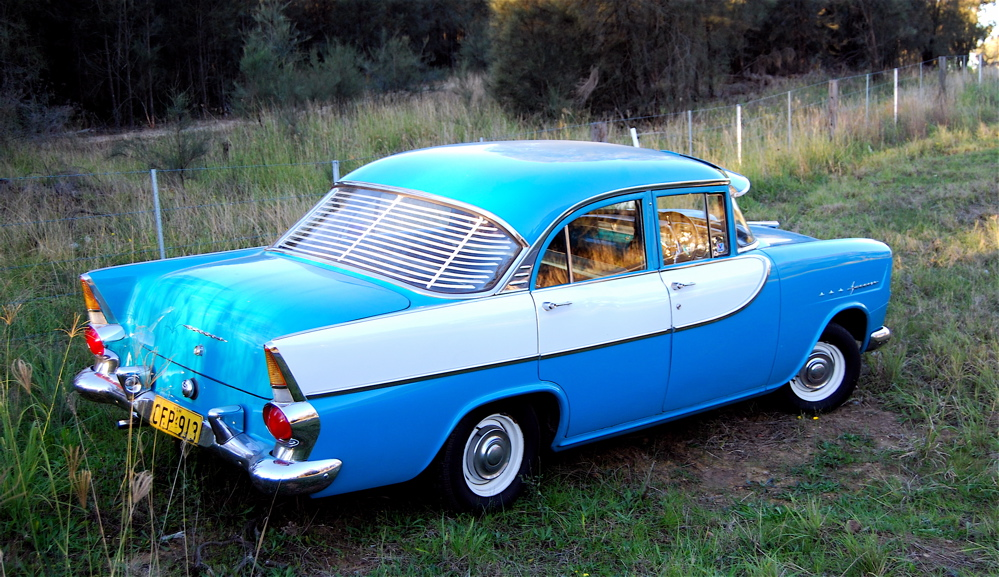
1961 Holden Special (FB) sedan (model 225), Twilight Turquoise with Grecian White flash.

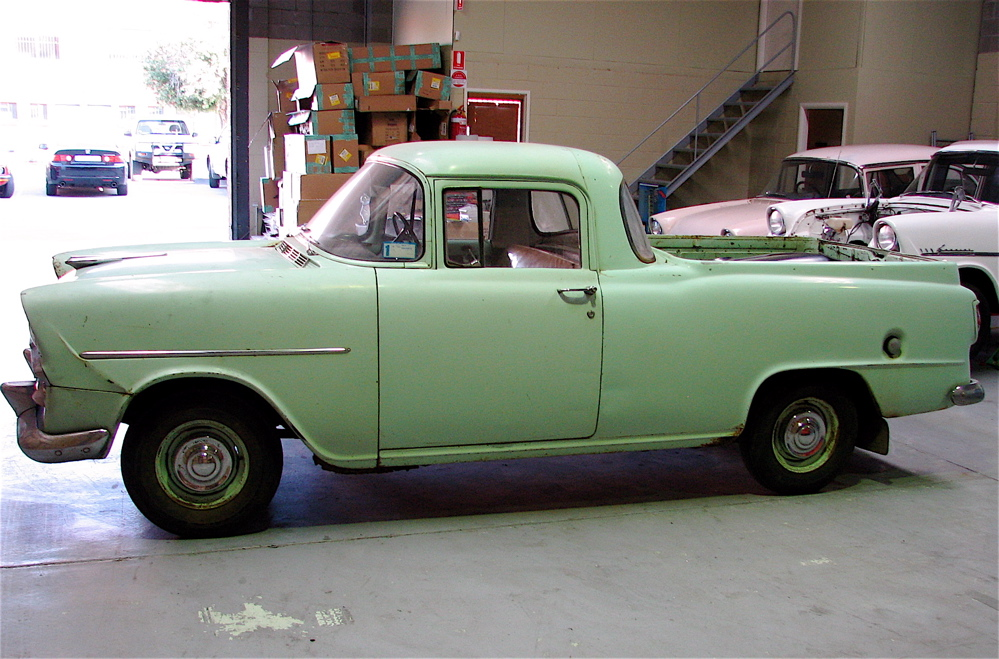
1960 Holden FB utility (model 2106) in Glade Green.

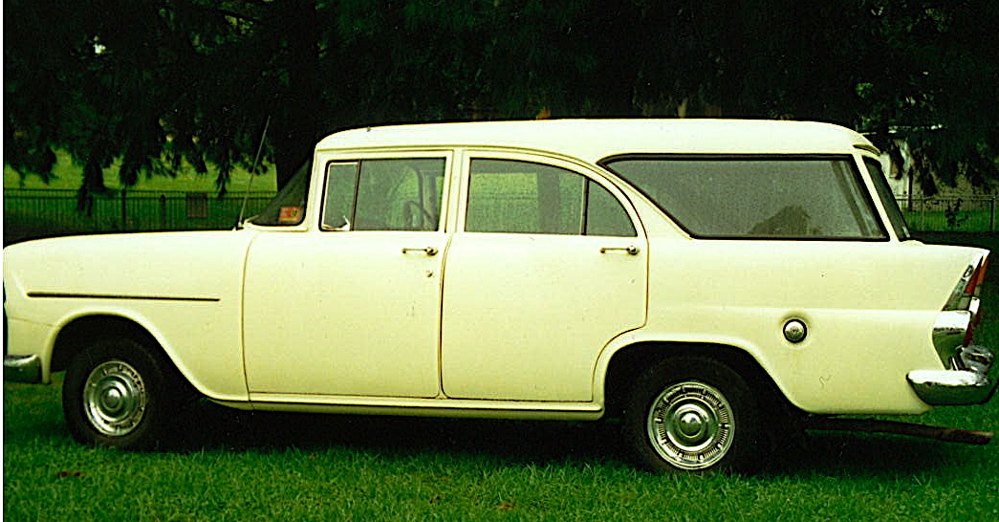
1960 Holden Standard (FB) station sedan (model 219), Honey Beige, ex-ambulance.

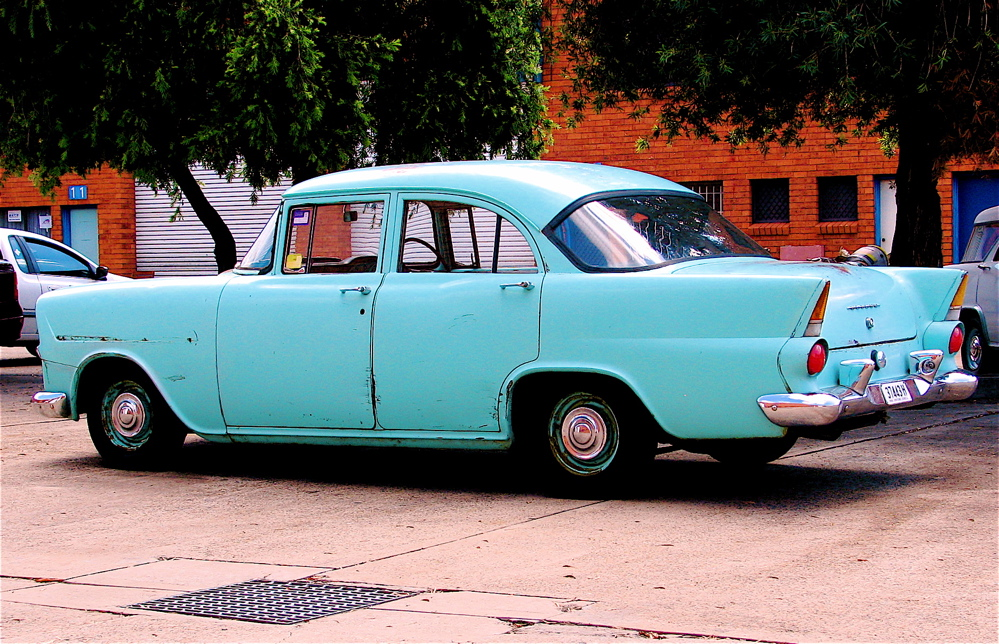
1960 Holden Standard (FB) sedan (model 215), Belmont Green.

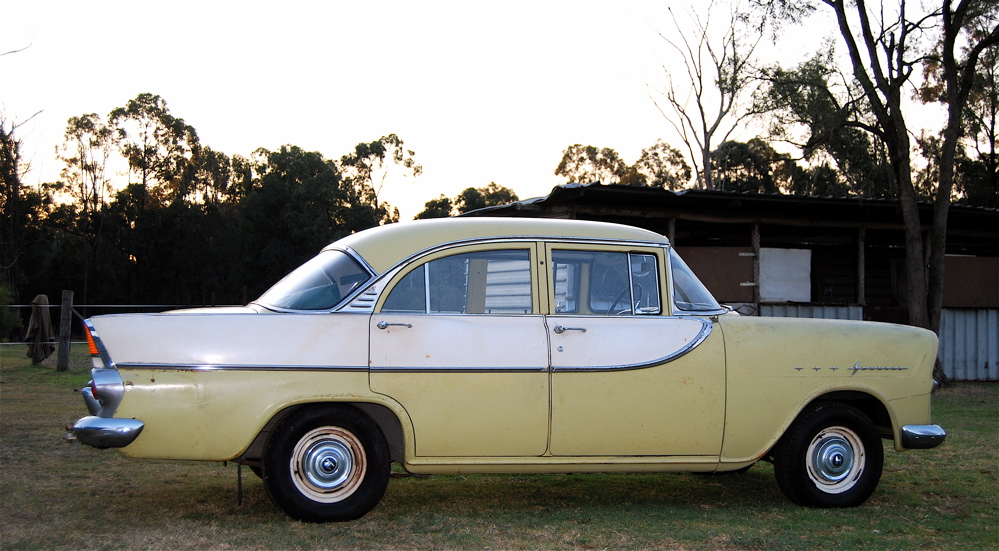
1960 Holden Special (FB) sedan (model 225), factory duco (pre-June 1960) Fernando Yellow nitro. See comparison later acrylic Satellite Yellow.

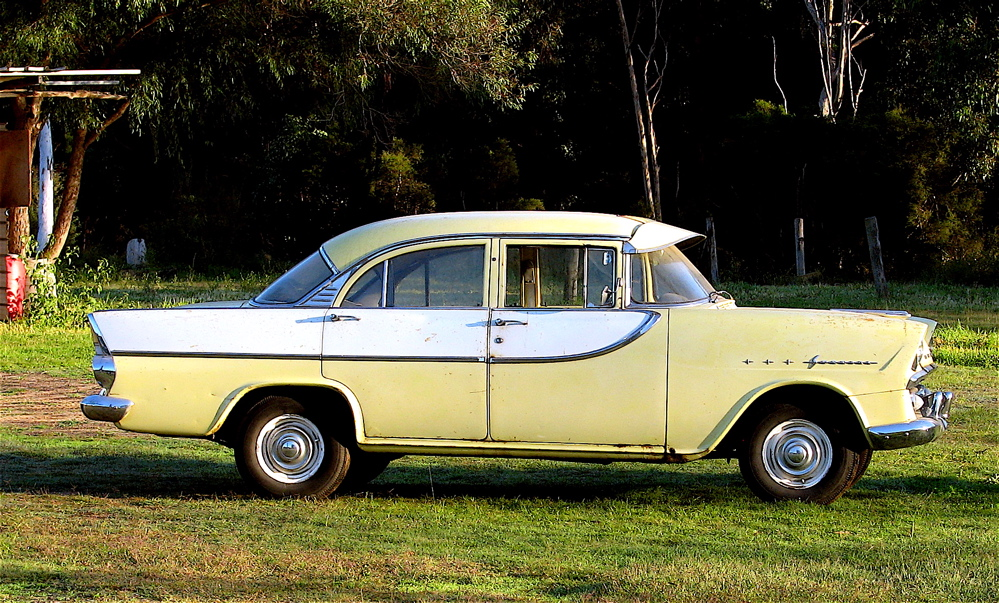
1960 Holden Special (FB) sedan (model 225), acrylic (post-June 1960) Satellite Yellow magic mirror finish. See comparison earlier nitro Fernando Yellow.

=== EK ===
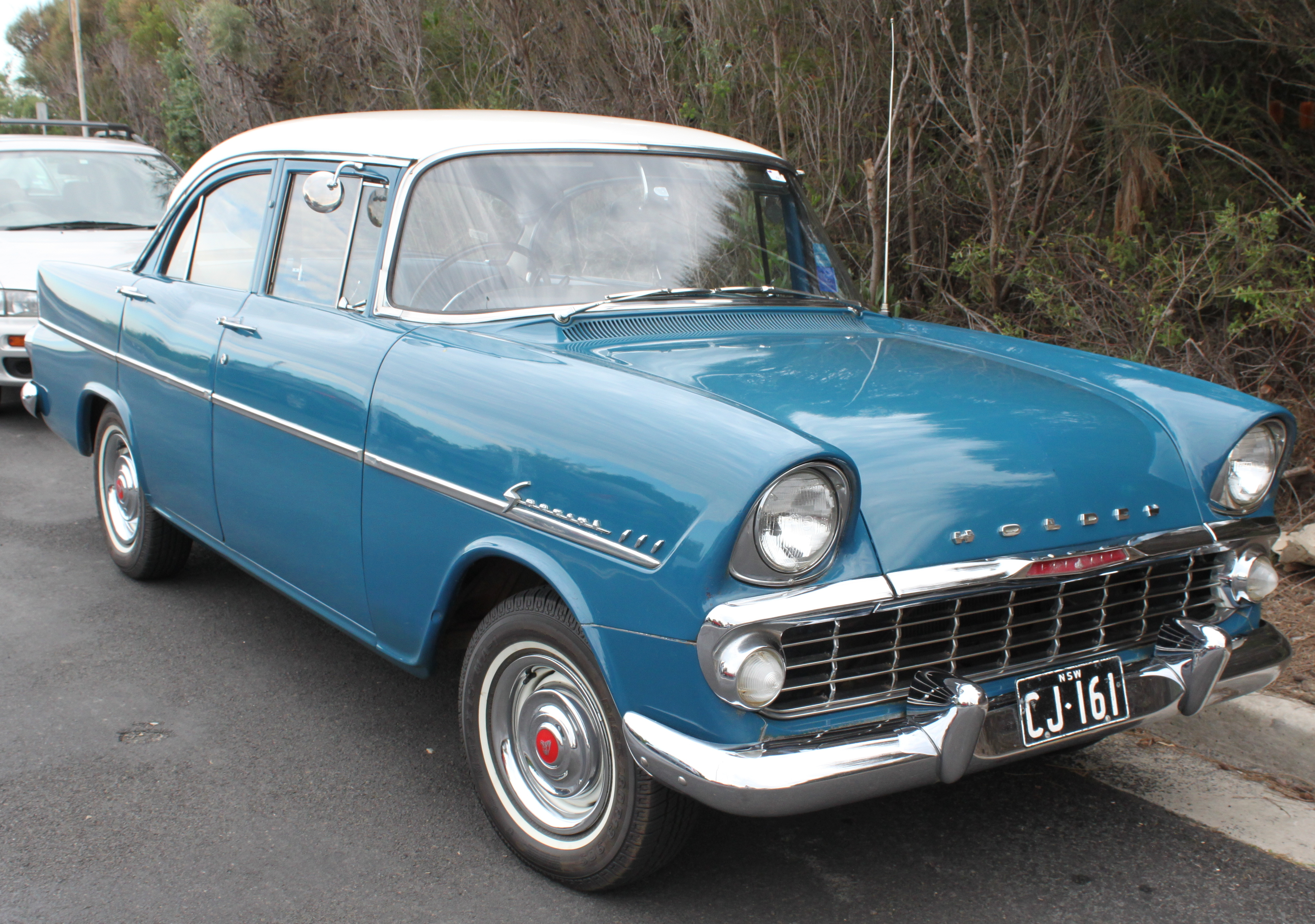
1961–1962 Holden EK Special

Introduced in May 1961, the Holden EK was essentially a cosmetic variation on the previous model the FB, with the addition of the first automatic transmission option factory-fitted to a Holden. 150,214 vehicles were produced. The Hydramatic was fully imported from the USA (used in many General Motors cars at the time).

The Hydramatic transmission was generally limited to the Special sedan (EK/225) and Special station sedan (EK/229); however, some examples of dealer orders for automatic transmissions exist with one known standard sedan (EK/215) Hydramatic (Snowcrest White, body no. 57, Sydney) with delivery paperwork to authenticate.

Further changes included the updating to electric windshield wipers (the previous model FB used vacuum wipers). The other changes were more cosmetic. Holden implemented stronger seat material "ElastoFab" due to the FB trim splitting at the seams quite easily, with the horizontal mid seat seam trim join. Holden also added a new grille, plenum chamber (Wiper Vent) cover, larger bumper bar over-riders, wider rear-view mirror, different badging and side trim style.

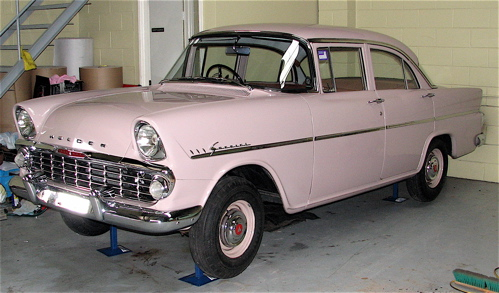
1961 Holden Special (EK) sedan (model 225) in Cameo Beige.

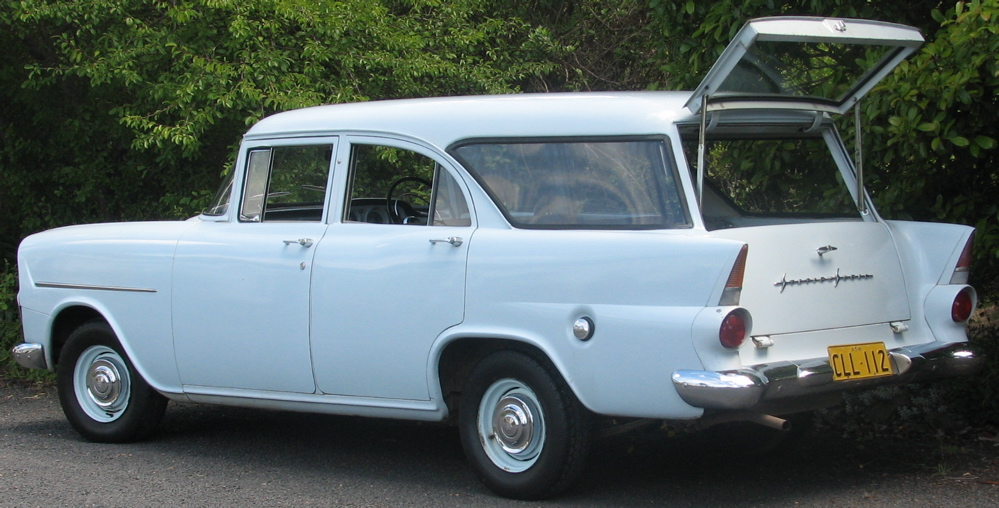
1961 Holden Standard (EK) station sedan (model 219) in Cataract Grey.

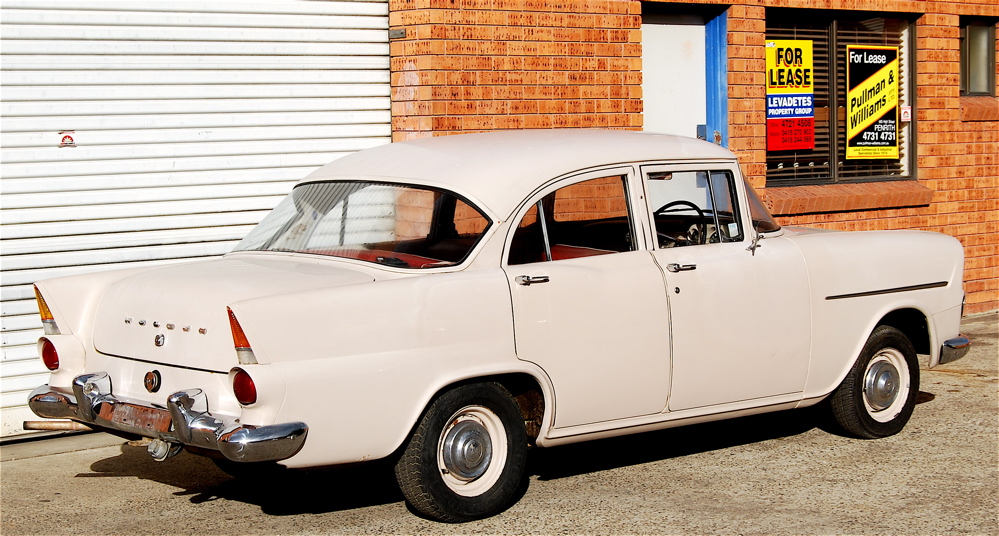
Holden EK Standard Sedan 1961 Model 215 Kiewa Grey (Holden Fleet Colour) SEC State Electricity Commission of Melbourne.

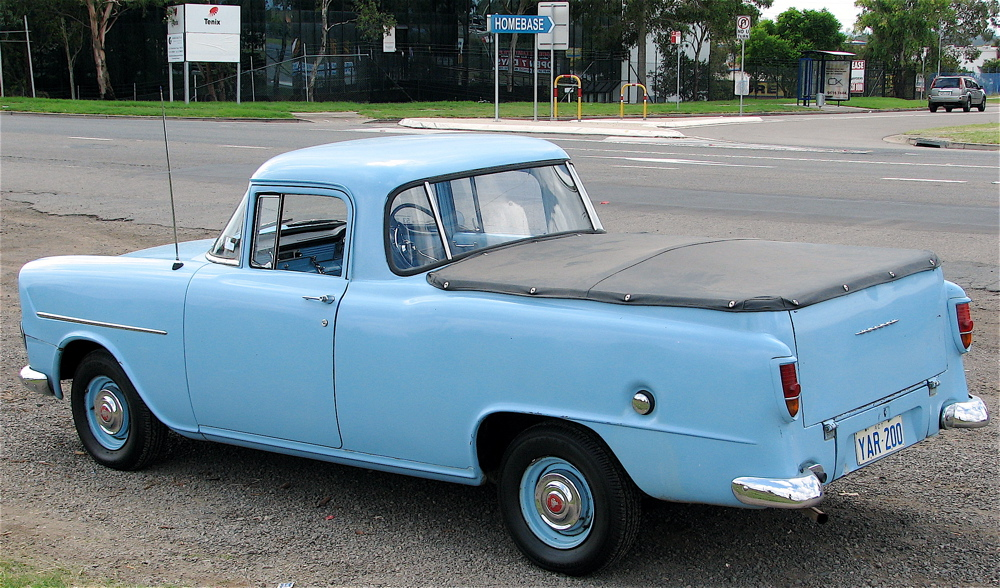
Holden EK Utility 1961 Model 2106 Strata Blue.

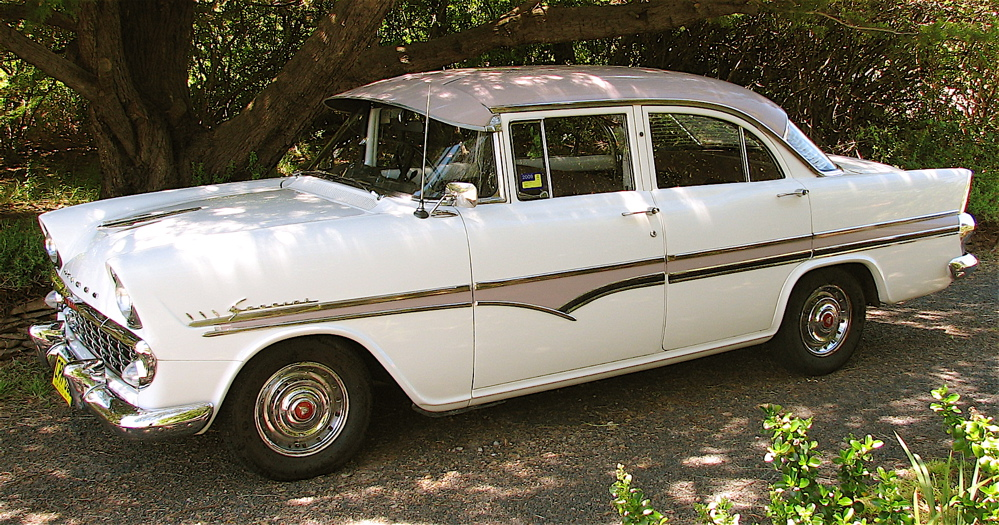
Holden EK 1961 Special Sedan Model 225 Snowcrest White Cameo Beige roof Canopy Industries accessory Flashline body moulds.

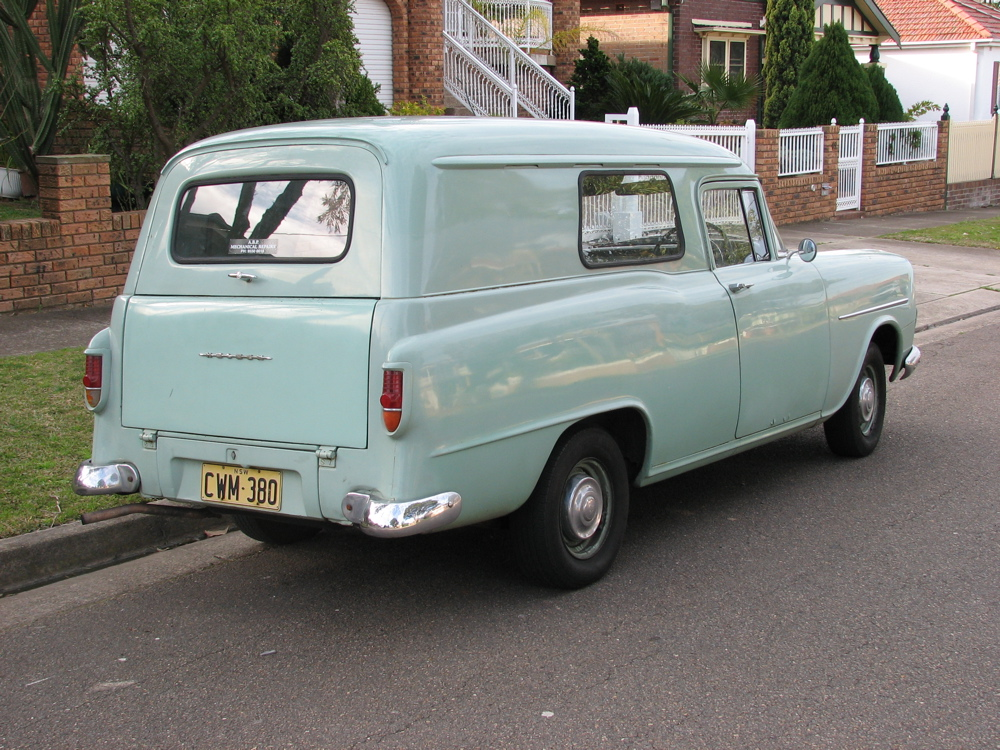
Holden EK 1961 Panel Van Model 2104 Pittwater Green with Canopy Industries accessory window.

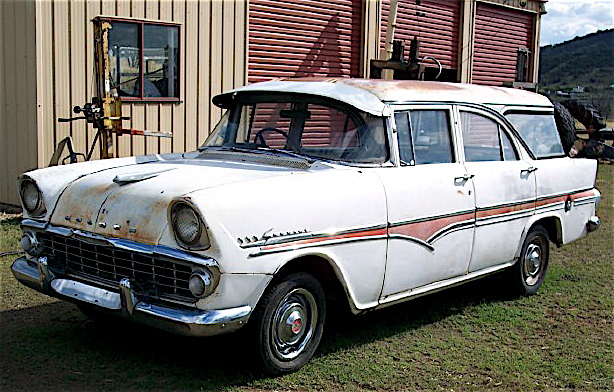
Holden EK 1961 Station Sedan Model 229 Snowcrest White with Red Flashline body moulds by Canopy Industries.

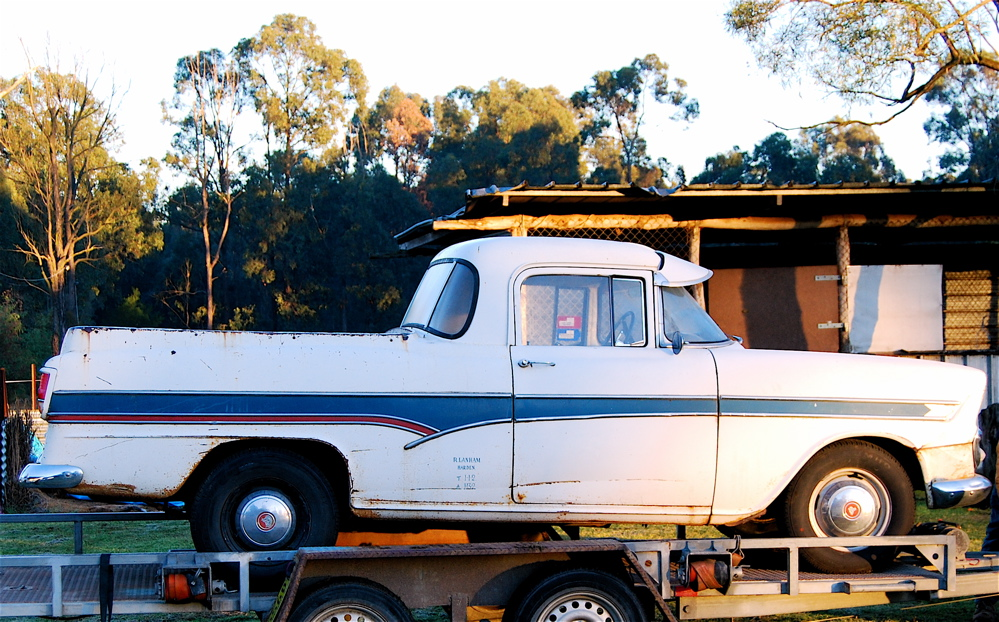
Holden EK 1961 Utility Model 2106 Snowcrest White with accessory Canopy industries Flashline body moulds.

== Fourth generation (1962–1965) ==
=== EJ ===
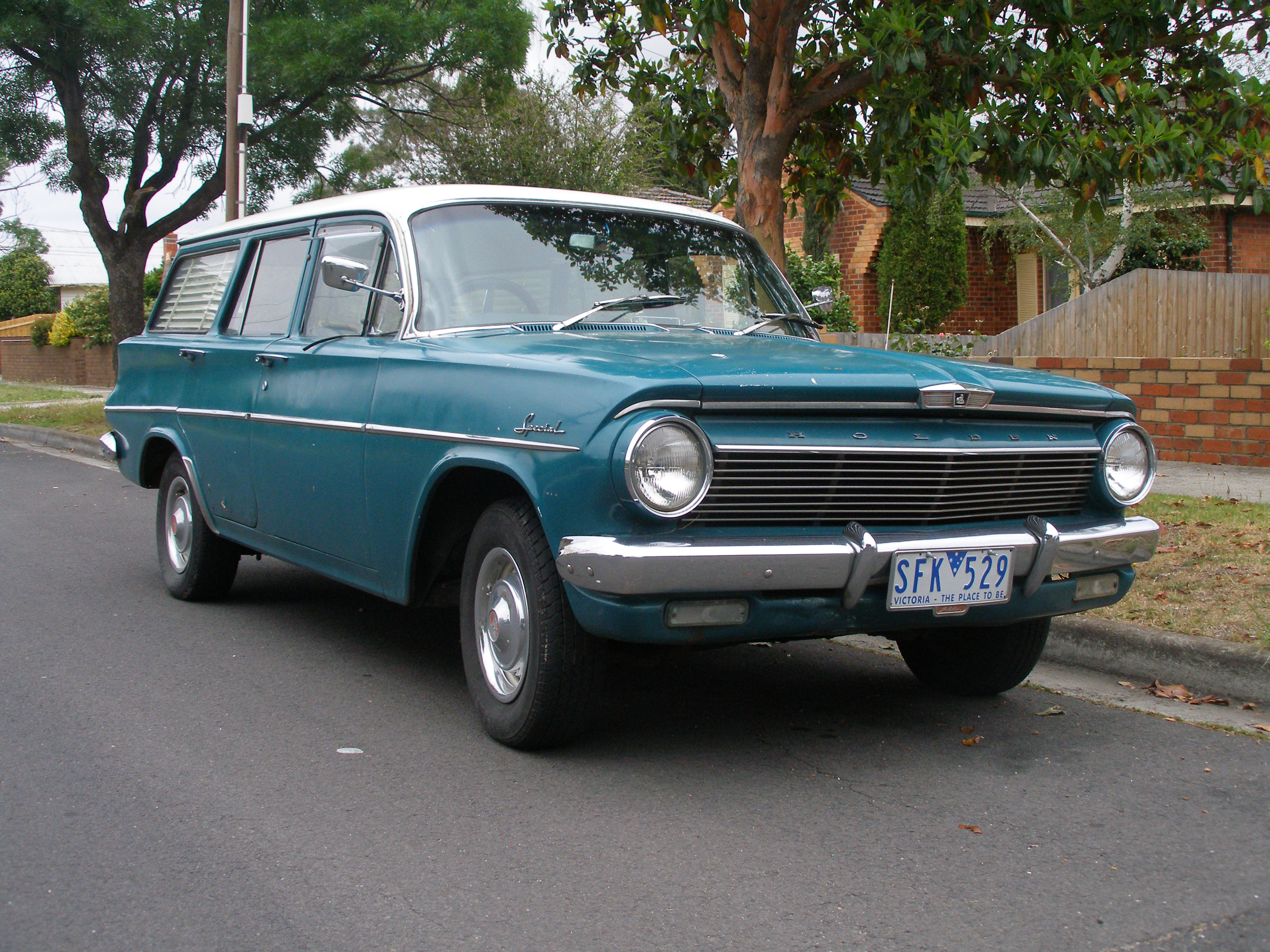
Holden Special (EJ) station sedan

In 1962, Holden launched a completely new, lower-profile streamlined body with more interior space, new foam-padded seating and better all-round visibility.

The "Premier" model was introduced and the name "Premier", was to be identified with luxury Classic Holden Cars for 16 years. The EJ Premier, first with standard metallic paint and auto transmission, offered leather trim bucket seats, heater, carpet, floor console and whitewalls. The EJ had Duo Servo brakes, strengthened front suspension, safety belt anchorages.

=== EH ===
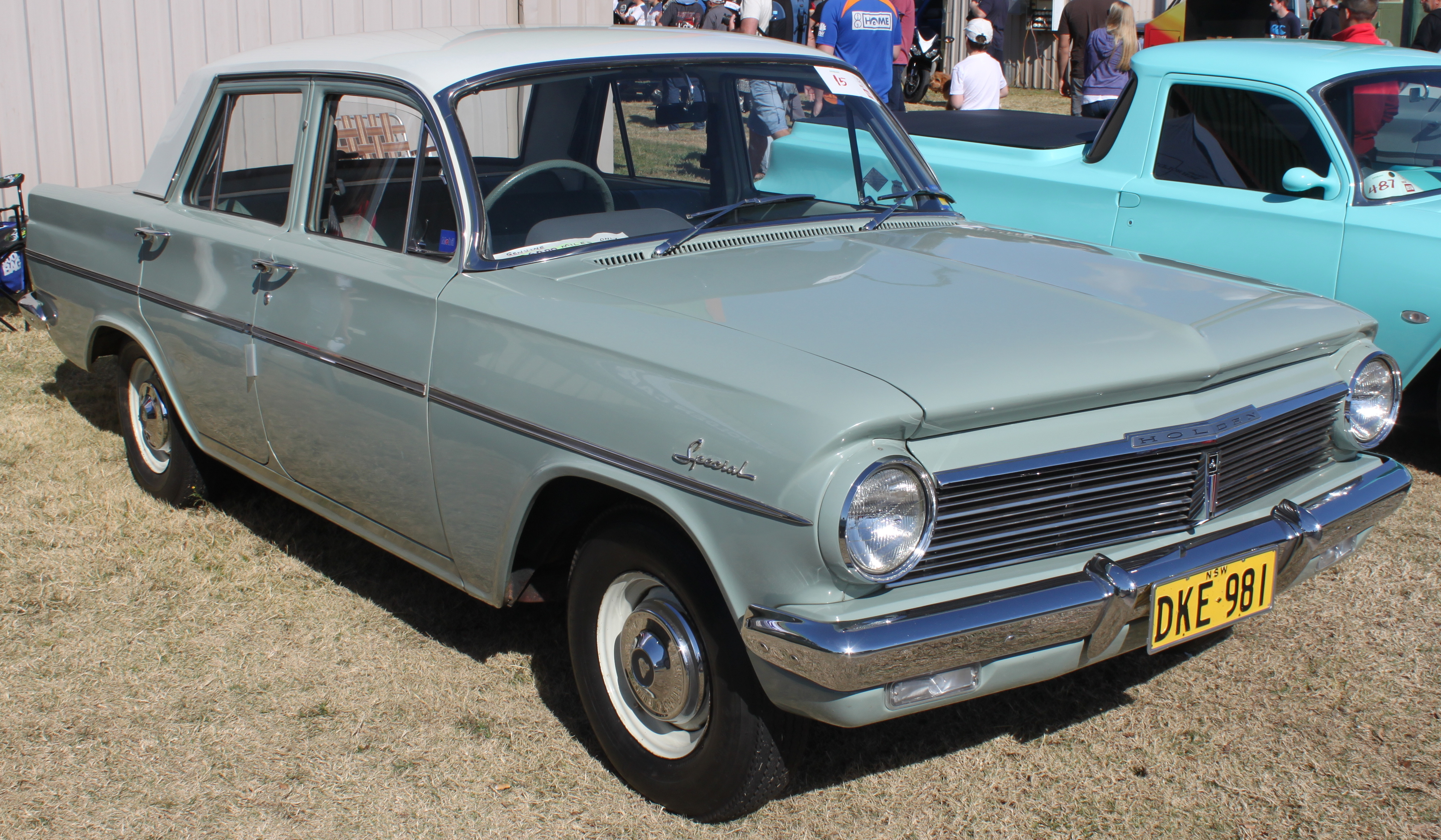
Holden Special (EH) sedan

The EH was introduced in 1963 and was the first Holden to incorporate the new "Red" engine, with a 7 main bearing crankshaft instead of the 4 main bearing crankshaft used in the "Grey" engine.

== Fifth generation (1965–1968) ==
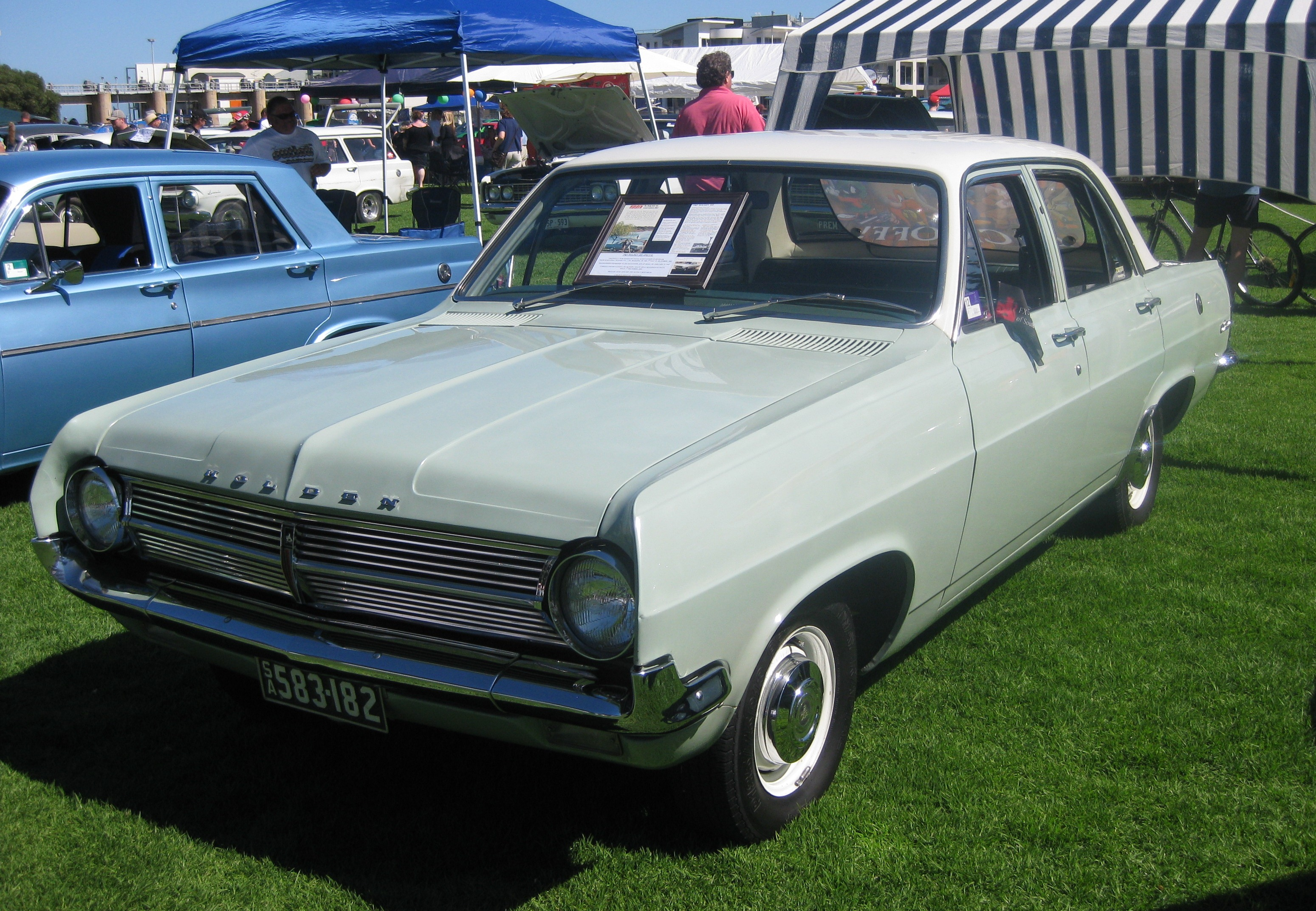
Holden HD Special Sedan

=== HD ===
The HD was introduced in 1965. It had a completely new body, which was wider and longer than that of the EH and offered significant increases in passenger space, load space and equipment levels. Body styling exhibited strong similarities to Vauxhall's FC Victor of the previous year, including that car's unusual concave rear window. Disc brakes were offered for the first time on a Holden model and the optional Hydramatic three–speed automatic transmission as used in the EH was replaced by a Powerglide two– speed unit.

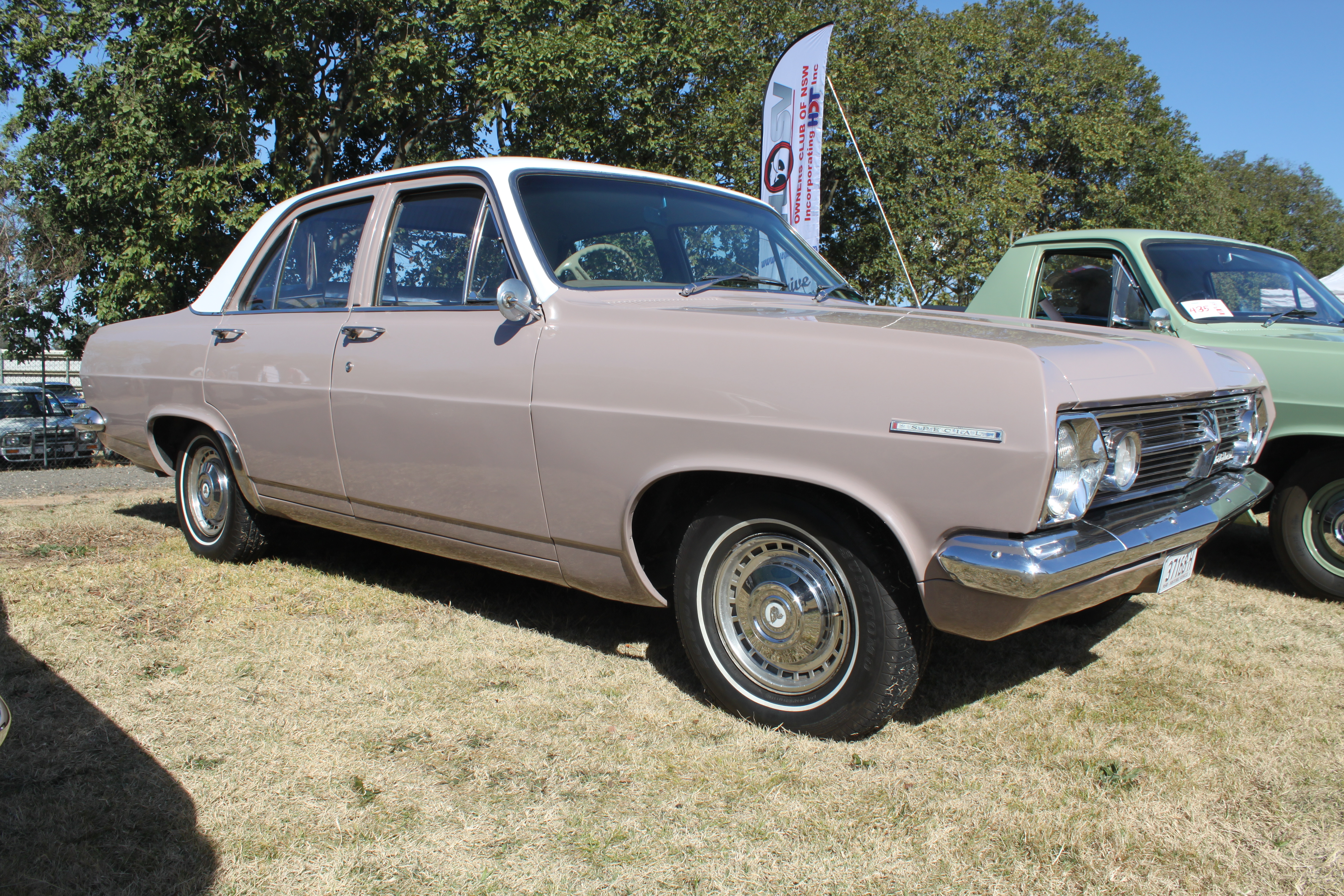
Holden HR Special

=== HR ===
The HR was introduced in 1966, featuring a revised grille, a reworked roofline and larger rear window (on the sedans), revised rear lights (on sedans and wagons) and changes to almost all exterior body panels. Other changes included revised ball joint front suspension, widened track, improved interior trim and woodgrain interior finish for the Premier models. Six months after the launch of the HR, all models were given a safety upgrade with the addition of front safety belts, windscreen washers, reversing lights, padded sun visors and a shatterproof interior rearview mirror.
